= 1944 United States Senate elections =

- November 7, 1944
- Class 3

35 of the 96 seats in the United States Senate 49 seats needed for a majority
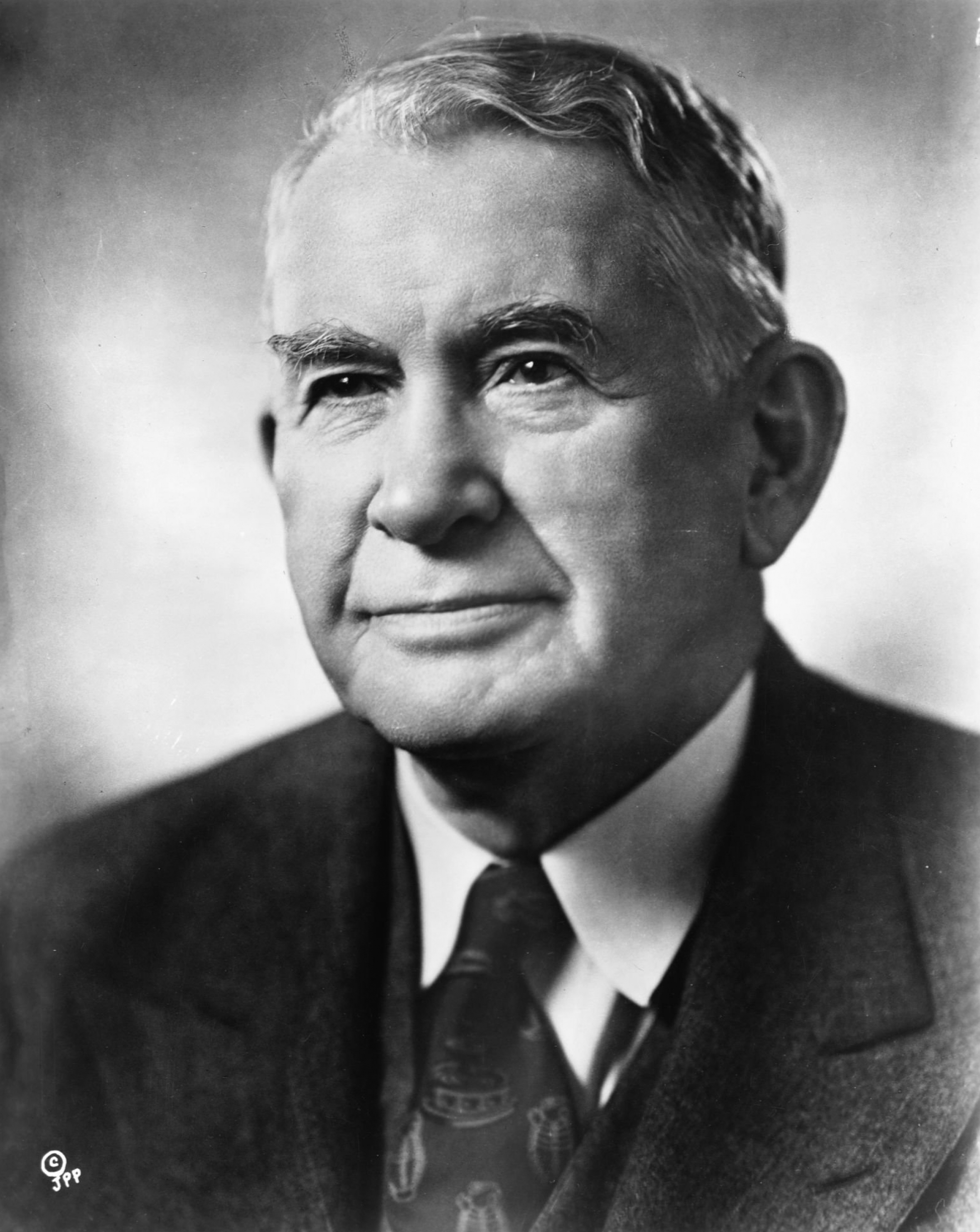

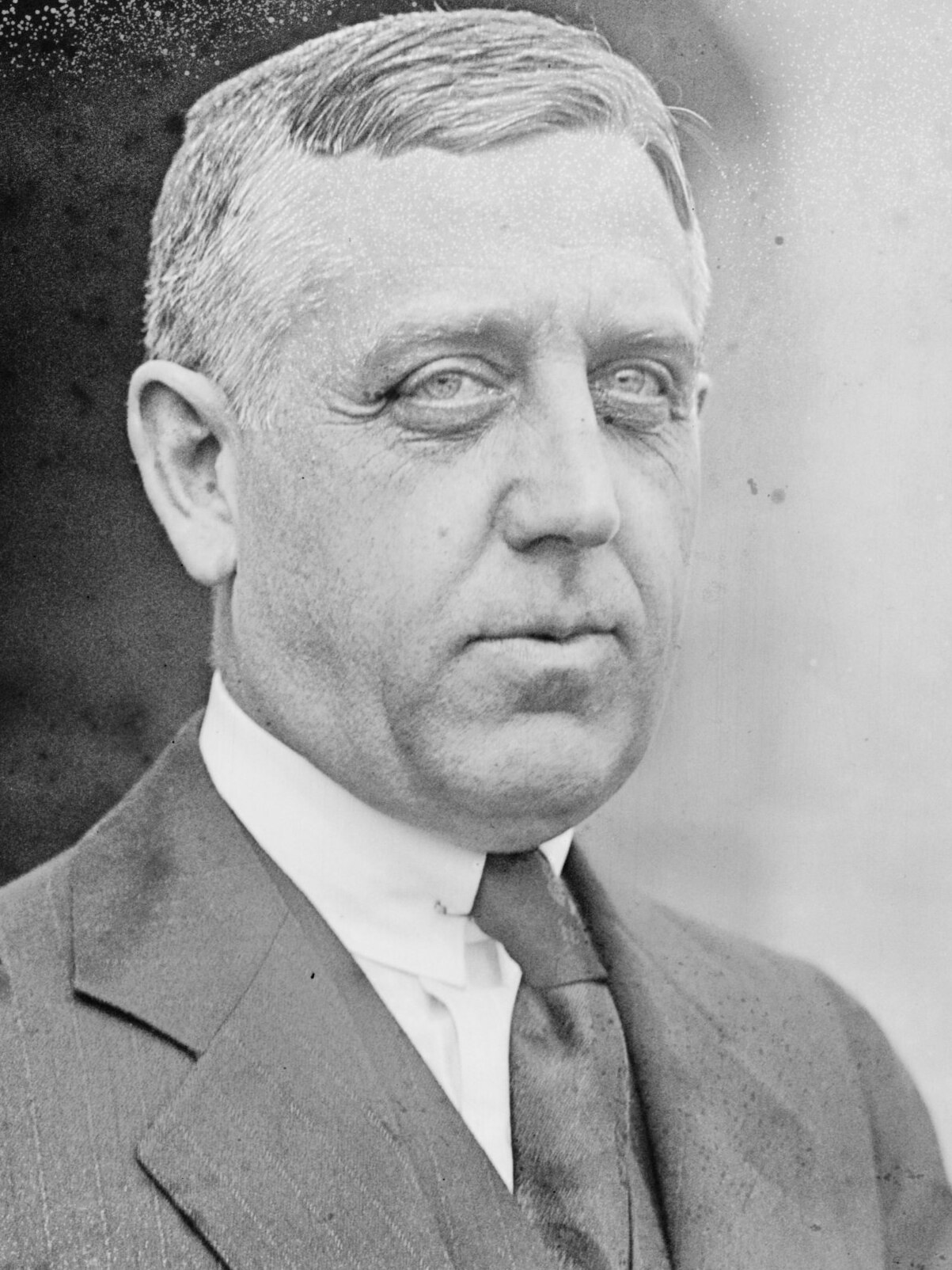
	Majority party	Minority party
Leader	Alben Barkley	Wallace White
Party	Democratic	Republican
Leader since	July 22, 1937	February 25, 1944
Leader's seat	Kentucky	Maine
Seats before	58	37
Seats after	57	38
Seat change	▼1	▲1
Popular vote	19,360,257 (Note: National vote totals for the Democratic Party do not include a combined 808,841 votes for the American Labor Party and the Liberal Party of New York, which endorsed and voted for the Democratic candidate, Robert F. Wagner.)	18,557,087
Percentage	49.4%	47.3%
Seats up	22	13
Races won	21	14
	Third party
Party	Progressive
Seats before	1
Seats after	1
Seat change	Steady
Popular vote	73,089
Percentage	0.2%
Seats up	0
Races won	0
- Results of the elections: Democratic gain Democratic hold Republican gain Republican hold No election Rectangular inset (Oregon): both seats up for election
Majority Leader before election
Alben Barkley
Democratic
Elected Majority Leader
Alben Barkley
Democratic

The 1944 United States Senate elections coincided with the re-election of Franklin D. Roosevelt to his fourth term as president. The 32 seats of Class 3 were contested in regular elections, and three special elections were held to fill vacancies.

The Democrats retained their large majority, although they lost a net of one seat to the Republicans. Republicans won open seats in Indiana, New Jersey, and Missouri; and they also defeated an incumbent in Iowa. However, Democrats defeated incumbents in Connecticut, Pennsylvania, and North Dakota, marking their first flips in the Senate since 1936. The Democratic majority was further reduced to 56-39-1 through midterm appointments.

== Results summary ==
↓
57	1	38
Democratic	P	Republican

Colored shading indicates party with largest share of that row.

Parties					Total
Parties	Democratic	Republican	Progressive	Other	Total
Last elections (1942)	57	38	1	0	96
Before these elections	58	37	1	0	96
Not up	36	24	1	—	61
Up	22	13	0	—	35
Class 3 (1938→1944)	21	11	0	—	32
Special: Class 1	1	0	—	—	1
Special: Class 2	0	2	—	—	2
Incumbent retired	4	1	—	—	5
Held by same party	2	1	—	—	3
Replaced by other party	▼2 Democrats replaced by ▲2 Republicans		—	—	2
Result	2	3	0	0	5
Incumbent ran	18	12	—	—	30
Won re-election	13	8	—	—	21
Lost re-election	▼3 Republicans replaced by ▲3 Democrats ▼1 Democrat replaced by ▲1 Republican		—	—	4
Lost renomination but held by same party	3	1	—	—	4
Lost renomination and party lost	▼1 Democrat replaced by ▲1 Republican		—	—	1
Result	19	11	0	0	30
Total elected	21	14	0	0	35
Net change	▼1	▲1	Steady	Steady	1
Nationwide vote	19,360,257	18,557,087	73,089	1,211,148	39,201,581
Share	49.39%	47.34%	0.19%	3.09%	100%
Result	57	38	1	0	96

Source: Clerk of the U.S. House of Representatives

== Gains, losses, and holds ==
=== Retirements ===
One Republican retired instead of seeking election to finish the unexpired term, one Democrat retired instead of seeking election to finish the unexpired term, one Democrat retired instead of seeking election to finish the unexpired term and election to a full term and two Democrats retired instead of seeking re-election.

State	Senator	Replaced by
Indiana (special)	Samuel D. Jackson	William E. Jenner
Indiana	Samuel D. Jackson	Homer E. Capehart
Massachusetts (special)	Sinclair Weeks	Leverett Saltonstall
New Jersey (special)	Arthur Walsh	H. Alexander Smith
North Carolina	Robert R. Reynolds	Clyde R. Hoey
Washington	Homer Bone	Warren Magnuson

=== Defeats ===
Four Republicans and five Democrats sought re-election but lost in the primary or general election.

State	Senator	Replaced by
Arkansas	Hattie Caraway	J. William Fulbright
Connecticut	John A. Danaher	Brien McMahon
Idaho	D. Worth Clark	Glen H. Taylor
Iowa	Guy Gillette	Bourke B. Hickenlooper
Missouri	Bennett Champ Clark	Forrest C. Donnell
North Dakota	Gerald Nye	John Moses
Oregon	Rufus C. Holman	Wayne Morse
Pennsylvania	James J. Davis	Francis J. Myers
South Carolina	Ellison D. Smith	Olin D. Johnston

=== Post election changes ===
State	Senator	Replaced by
Alabama	John H. Bankhead II	George R. Swift
California	Hiram Johnson	William Knowland
Nevada	James G. Scrugham	Edward P. Carville
Connecticut	Francis T. Maloney	Thomas C. Hart
North Dakota	John Moses	Milton Young
Ohio	Harold H. Burton	James W. Huffman
Idaho	John Thomas	Charles C. Gossett
Kentucky	Happy Chandler	William A. Stanfill
Virginia	Carter Glass	Thomas G. Burch
Missouri	Harry S. Truman	Frank P. Briggs
Washington	Monrad Wallgren	Hugh Mitchell

== Change in composition ==
=== Before the elections ===
At the beginning of 1944.

		D_{1}	D_{2}	D_{3}	D_{4}	D_{5}	D_{6}	D_{7}	D_{8}
D_{18}	D_{17}	D_{16}	D_{15}	D_{14}	D_{13}	D_{12}	D_{11}	D_{10}	D_{9}
D_{19}	D_{20}	D_{21}	D_{22}	D_{23}	D_{24}	D_{25}	D_{26}	D_{27}	D_{28}
D_{38} Ariz. Ran	D_{37} Ala. Ran	D_{36}	D_{35}	D_{34}	D_{33}	D_{32}	D_{31}	D_{30}	D_{29}
D_{39} Ark. Ran	D_{40} Calif. Ran	D_{41} Fla. Ran	D_{42} Ga. Ran	D_{43} Idaho; Ran	D_{44} Ill. Ran	D_{45} Ind. (sp); Ind. (reg); Retired	D_{46} Iowa; Ran	D_{47} Ky. Ran	D_{48} La. Ran
Majority →									D_{49} Md. Ran
D_{58} Wash. Retired	D_{57} Utah; Ran	D_{56} S.C. Ran	D_{55} Okla. Ran	D_{54} N.C. Retired	D_{53} N.Y. Ran	D_{52} N.J. (sp); Ran	D_{51} Nev. Ran	D_{50} Mo. Ran	D_{49} Md. Ran
P_{1}	R_{37} Wisc. Ran	R_{36} Vt. Ran	R_{35} S.D. Ran	R_{34} Pa. Ran	R_{33} Ore. (sp); Ran	R_{32} Ore. (reg); Ran	R_{31} Ohio; Ran	R_{30} N.D. Ran	R_{29} N.H. Ran
R_{19}	R_{20}	R_{21}	R_{22}	R_{23}	R_{24}	R_{25} Colo. Ran	R_{26} Conn. Ran	R_{27} Kan. Ran	R_{28} Mass. (sp); Retired
R_{18}	R_{17}	R_{16}	R_{15}	R_{14}	R_{13}	R_{12}	R_{11}	R_{10}	R_{9}
		R_{1}	R_{2}	R_{3}	R_{4}	R_{5}	R_{6}	R_{7}	R_{8}

=== Election results ===
		D_{1}	D_{2}	D_{3}	D_{4}	D_{5}	D_{6}	D_{7}	D_{8}
D_{18}	D_{17}	D_{16}	D_{15}	D_{14}	D_{13}	D_{12}	D_{11}	D_{10}	D_{9}
D_{19}	D_{20}	D_{21}	D_{22}	D_{23}	D_{24}	D_{25}	D_{26}	D_{27}	D_{28}
D_{38} Ariz. Re-elected	D_{37} Ala. Re-elected	D_{36}	D_{35}	D_{34}	D_{33}	D_{32}	D_{31}	D_{30}	D_{29}
D_{39} Ark. Hold	D_{40} Calif. Re-elected	D_{41} Fla. Re-elected	D_{42} Ga. Re-elected	D_{43} Idaho; Hold	D_{44} Ill. Re-elected	D_{45} Ky. Re-elected	D_{46} La. Re-elected	D_{47} Md. Re-elected	D_{48} Nev. Re-elected
Majority →									D_{49} N.Y. Re-elected
P_{1}	D_{57} Pa. Gain	D_{56} N.D. Gain	D_{55} Conn. Gain	D_{54} Wash. Hold	D_{53} Utah; Re-elected	D_{52} S.C. Hold	D_{51} Okla. Re-elected	D_{50} N.C. Hold	D_{49} N.Y. Re-elected
R_{38} N.J. (sp); Gain	R_{37} Mo. Gain	R_{36} Iowa; Gain	R_{35} Ind. (sp); Ind. (reg); Gain	R_{34} Wisc. Re-elected	R_{33} Vt. Re-elected	R_{32} S.D. Re-elected	R_{31} Ore. (sp); Elected (Note: Appointee elected)	R_{30} Ore. (reg); Hold	R_{29} Ohio; Re-elected
R_{19}	R_{20}	R_{21}	R_{22}	R_{23}	R_{24}	R_{25} Colo. Re-elected	R_{26} Kan. Re-elected	R_{27} Mass. (sp); Hold	R_{28} N.H. Re-elected
R_{18}	R_{17}	R_{16}	R_{15}	R_{14}	R_{13}	R_{12}	R_{11}	R_{10}	R_{9}
		R_{1}	R_{2}	R_{3}	R_{4}	R_{5}	R_{6}	R_{7}	R_{8}

Key

D_{#}	Democratic
P_{#}	Progressive
R_{#}	Republican

== Race summaries ==
=== Special elections during the 78th Congress ===
In these special elections, the winner was seated during 1944 or before January 3, 1945; ordered by election date.

State	Incumbent			Results	Candidates
State	Senator	Party	Electoral history	Results	Candidates
Indiana Class 3	Samuel D. Jackson	Democratic	1944 (Appointed)	Interim appointee retired. New senator elected November 7, 1944. Republican gain. Winner did not run for the next term, see below.	▌ ✓ William E. Jenner (Republican) 52.1%; ▌Henry F. Schricker (Democratic) 47.1%
Massachusetts Class 2	Sinclair Weeks	Republican	1944 (Appointed)	Interim appointee retired. New senator elected November 7, 1944. Republican hold.	▌ ✓ Leverett Saltonstall (Republican) 64.3%; ▌John H. Corcoran (Democratic) 34.9%
New Jersey Class 1	Arthur Walsh	Democratic	1943 (Appointed)	Interim appointee retired. New senator elected November 7, 1944. Republican gain.	▌ ✓ H. Alexander Smith (Republican) 50.4%; ▌Elmer H. Wene (Democratic) 48.8%
Oregon Class 2	Guy Cordon	Republican	1944 (Appointed)	Interim appointee elected November 7, 1944.	▌ ✓ Guy Cordon (Republican) 57.5%; ▌Willis Mahoney (Democratic) 42.5%

=== Races leading to the 79th Congress ===
In these general elections, the winners were elected for the term beginning January 3, 1945; ordered by state.

All of the elections involved the Class 3 seats.

State	Incumbent			Results	Candidates
State	Senator	Party	Electoral history	Results	Candidates
Alabama	J. Lister Hill	Democratic	1938 (Appointed); 1938 (special); 1938	Incumbent re-elected.	▌ ✓ J. Lister Hill (Democratic) 81.8%; ▌John A. Posey (Republican) 17.0%
Arizona	Carl Hayden	Democratic	1926; 1932; 1938	Incumbent re-elected.	▌ ✓ Carl Hayden (Democratic) 69.4%; ▌Fred W. Fickett (Republican) 30.6%
Arkansas	Hattie Caraway	Democratic	1931 (Appointed); 1932 (special); 1932; 1938	Incumbent lost renomination. New senator elected. Democratic hold.	▌ ✓ J. William Fulbright (Democratic) 85.1%; ▌Victor M. Wade (Republican) 14.9%
California	Sheridan Downey	Democratic	1938	Incumbent re-elected.	▌ ✓ Sheridan Downey (Democratic) 52.3%; ▌Frederick F. Houser (Republican) 47.7%
Colorado	Eugene Millikin	Republican	1941 (Appointed); 1942	Incumbent re-elected.	▌ ✓ Eugene Millikin (Republican) 56.1%; ▌Barney L. Whatley (Democratic) 43.0%
Connecticut	John A. Danaher	Republican	1938	Incumbent lost re-election. New senator elected. Democratic gain.	▌ ✓ Brien McMahon (Democratic) 51.7%; ▌John A. Danaher (Republican) 47.3%
Florida	Claude Pepper	Democratic	1936 (special); 1938	Incumbent re-elected.	▌ ✓ Claude Pepper (Democratic) 71.3%; ▌Miles H. Draper (Republican) 28.7%
Georgia	Walter F. George	Democratic	1922 (special); 1926; 1932; 1938	Incumbent re-elected.	▌ ✓ Walter F. George (Democratic); Unopposed
Idaho	D. Worth Clark	Democratic	1938	Incumbent lost renomination. New senator elected. Democratic hold.	▌ ✓ Glen H. Taylor (Democratic) 51.1%; ▌C. A. Bottolfsen (Republican) 48.9%
Illinois	Scott W. Lucas	Democratic	1938	Incumbent re-elected.	▌ ✓ Scott W. Lucas (Democratic) 52.6%; ▌Richard J. Lyons (Republican) 47.1%
Indiana	Samuel D. Jackson	Democratic	1944 (Appointed)	Interim appointee retired. New senator elected. Republican gain. Winner did not run to finish the term, see above.	▌ ✓ Homer E. Capehart (Republican) 50.2%; ▌Henry F. Schricker (Democratic) 48.9%
Iowa	Guy Gillette	Democratic	1936 (special); 1938	Incumbent lost re-election. New senator elected. Republican gain.	▌ ✓ Bourke B. Hickenlooper (Republican) 51.3%; ▌Guy Gillette (Democratic) 48.4%
Kansas	Clyde M. Reed	Republican	1938	Incumbent re-elected.	▌ ✓ Clyde M. Reed (Republican) 57.8%; ▌Thurman Hill (Democratic) 40.7%
Kentucky	Alben W. Barkley	Democratic	1926; 1932; 1938	Incumbent re-elected.	▌ ✓ Alben W. Barkley (Democratic) 54.8%; ▌James Park (Republican) 44.9%
Louisiana	John H. Overton	Democratic	1932; 1938	Incumbent re-elected.	▌ ✓ John H. Overton (Democratic); Unopposed
Maryland	Millard Tydings	Democratic	1926; 1932; 1938	Incumbent re-elected.	▌ ✓ Millard Tydings (Democratic) 61.7%; ▌Blanchard Randall Jr. (Republican) 38.3%
Missouri	Bennett Champ Clark	Democratic	1932; 1933 (Appointed); 1938	Incumbent lost renomination. New senator elected. Republican gain.	▌ ✓ Forrest C. Donnell (Republican) 50.0%; ▌Roy McKittrick (Democratic) 49.9%
Nevada	Pat McCarran	Democratic	1932; 1938	Incumbent re-elected.	▌ ✓ Pat McCarran (Democratic) 58.4%; ▌George W. Malone (Republican) 41.6%
New Hampshire	Charles W. Tobey	Republican	1938	Incumbent re-elected.	▌ ✓ Charles W. Tobey (Republican) 50.9%; ▌Joseph J. Betley (Democratic) 49.1%
New York	Robert F. Wagner	Democratic	1926; 1932; 1938	Incumbent re-elected.	▌ ✓ Robert F. Wagner (Democratic) 53.1%; ▌Thomas J. Curran (Republican) 46.7%
North Carolina	Robert R. Reynolds	Democratic	1932; 1932 (special); 1938	Incumbent retired. New senator elected. Democratic hold.	▌ ✓ Clyde R. Hoey (Democratic) 70.3%; ▌A. I. Ferree (Republican) 29.8%
North Dakota	Gerald Nye	Republican	1925 (Appointed); 1926 (special); 1932; 1938	Incumbent lost re-election. New senator elected. Democratic gain.	▌ ✓ John Moses (Democratic) 45.2%; ▌Gerald Nye (Republican) 33.0%; ▌Lynn U. Stambaugh (Independent) 21.2%
Ohio	Robert A. Taft	Republican	1938	Incumbent re-elected.	▌ ✓ Robert A. Taft (Republican) 50.3%; ▌William G. Pickrel (Democratic) 49.7%
Oklahoma	Elmer Thomas	Democratic	1926; 1932; 1938	Incumbent re-elected.	▌ ✓ Elmer Thomas (Democratic) 55.7%; ▌William Otjen (Republican) 44.0%
Oregon	Rufus C. Holman	Republican	1938	Incumbent lost renomination. New senator elected. Republican hold.	▌ ✓ Wayne Morse (Republican) 60.7%; ▌Edgar W. Smith (Democratic) 39.3%
Pennsylvania	James J. Davis	Republican	1930 (special); 1932; 1938	Incumbent lost re-election. New senator elected. Democratic gain.	▌ ✓ Francis J. Myers (Democratic) 50.0%; ▌James J. Davis (Republican) 49.4%
South Carolina	Ellison D. Smith	Democratic	1909; 1914; 1920; 1926; 1932; 1938	Incumbent lost renomination. New senator elected. Democratic hold. Incumbent died November 17, 1944. Wilton E. Hall appointed just to finish the term.	▌ ✓ Olin D. Johnston (Democratic) 93.0%; ▌James B. Gaston (Republican) 3.7%; ▌Osceola McKaine (Prog. Democratic) 3.2%
South Dakota	Chan Gurney	Republican	1938	Incumbent re-elected.	▌ ✓ Chan Gurney (Republican) 63.9%; ▌George M. Bradshaw (Democratic) 36.1%
Utah	Elbert D. Thomas	Democratic	1932; 1938	Incumbent re-elected.	▌ ✓ Elbert D. Thomas (Democratic) 59.9%; ▌Adam S. Bennion (Republican) 40.1%
Vermont	George Aiken	Republican	1940 (special)	Incumbent re-elected.	▌ ✓ George Aiken (Republican) 65.8%; ▌Harry W. Witters (Democratic) 34.2%
Washington	Homer Bone	Democratic	1932; 1938	Incumbent retired to become Judge of the U.S. Court of Appeals. New senator elected. Democratic hold. Incumbent resigned November 13, 1944, and winner was appointed December 14 to finish the term.	▌ ✓ Warren Magnuson (Democratic) 55.1%; ▌Harry P. Cain (Republican) 44.4%; ▌Ray C. Roberts (Socialist) 0.2%; ▌Josephine B. Sulston (Prohibition) 0.2%
Wisconsin	Alexander Wiley	Republican	1938	Incumbent re-elected.	▌ ✓ Alexander Wiley (Republican) 50.5%; ▌Howard J. McMurray (Democratic) 42.8%; ▌Harry Sauthoff (Progressive) 5.8%

== Closest races ==
Fourteen races had a margin of victory under 10%:

State	Party of winner	Margin
Missouri	Republican (flip)	0.1%
Ohio	Republican	0.6%
Pennsylvania	Democratic (flip)	0.6%
Indiana (regular)	Republican	1.3%
New Jersey (special)	Republican (flip)	1.6%
New Hampshire	Republican	1.8%
Idaho	Democratic	2.2%
Iowa	Republican (flip)	2.9%
Connecticut	Democratic (flip)	4.4%
California	Democratic	4.6%
Indiana (special)	Republican (flip)	5.0%
Illinois	Democratic	5.5%
New York	Democratic	6.4%
Wisconsin	Republican	7.7%
Kentucky	Democratic	9.9%

Utah was the tipping point state with a margin of 19.8%.

== Alabama ==
1944 United States Senate election in Alabama
- November 7, 1944
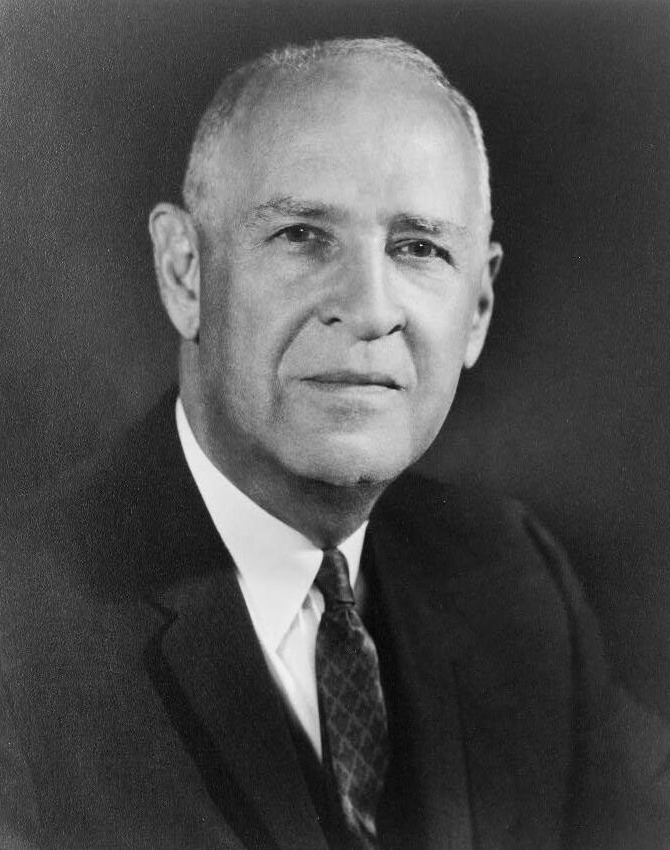

Nominee	J. Lister Hill	John A. Posey
Party	Democratic	Republican
Popular vote	202,604	41,983
Percentage	81.78%	16.95%
- County results Hill: 50–60% 60–70% 70–80% 80–90% 90–100% Posey: 60–70%
U.S. senator before election
J. Lister Hill
Democratic
Elected U.S. Senator
J. Lister Hill
Democratic

Alabama election
Party	Candidate	Votes	%
Democratic	J. Lister Hill (Incumbent)	202,604	81.78%
Republican	John A. Posey	41,983	16.95%
Prohibition	Hollis B. Parrish	3,162	1.28%
Majority		160,621	64.83%
Turnout		247,749	
Democratic hold			

== Arizona ==
1944 United States Senate election in Arizona
- November 7, 1944
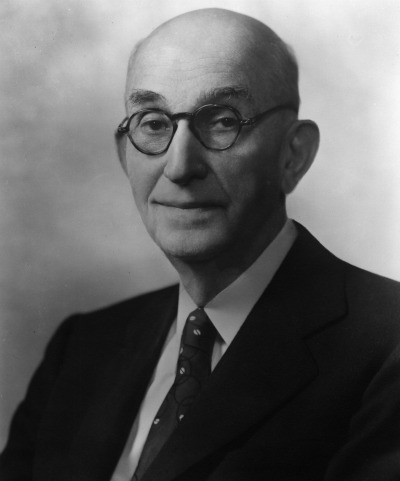

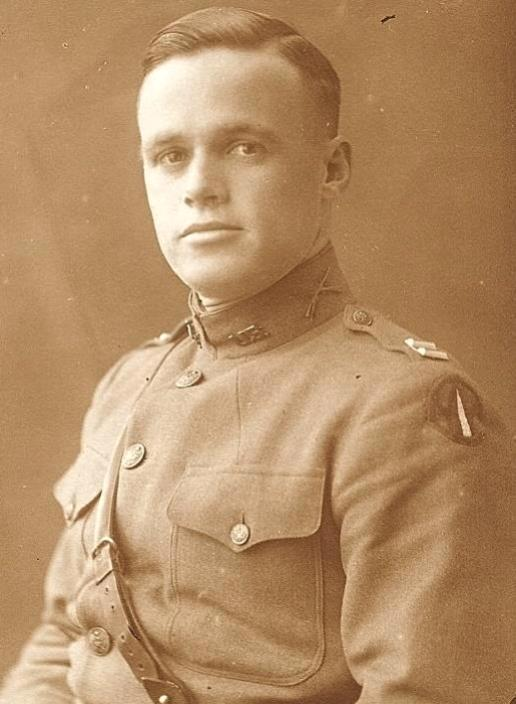
Nominee	Carl Hayden	Fred Wildon Fickett Jr.
Party	Democratic	Republican
Popular vote	90,335	39,891
Percentage	69.37%	30.63%
- County results Hayden: 60–70% 70–80% 80–90%
U.S. senator before election
Carl Hayden
Democratic
Elected U.S. Senator
Carl Hayden
Democratic

Three-term Democrat Carl T. Hayden was easily re-elected.

1944 United States Senate election in Arizona
Party	Candidate	Votes	%
Democratic	Carl T. Hayden (incumbent)	90,335	69.37%
Republican	Fred Wildon Fickett Jr.	39,891	30.63%
Majority		50,444	38.74%
Turnout		130,226	
Democratic hold			

Hayden would be re-elected three more times before retiring in 1962.

== Arkansas ==
1944 U.S. Senate election in Arkansas
- November 7, 1944
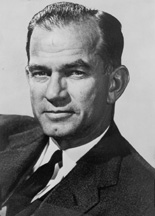

Nominee	J. William Fulbright	Victor Wade
Party	Democratic	Republican
Popular vote	182,499	31,942
Percentage	85.10%	14.90%
- County results Fulbright: 50–60% 60–70% 70–80% 80–90% >90%
U.S. senator before election
Hattie Caraway
Democratic
Elected U.S. Senator
J. William Fulbright
Democratic

Arkansas election
Party	Candidate	Votes	%
Democratic	J. William Fulbright	182,499	85.10%
Republican	Victor M. Wade	31,942	14.90%
Majority		150,575	70.20%
Turnout		214,441	
Democratic hold			

== California ==
1944 United States Senate election in California
- November 7, 1944
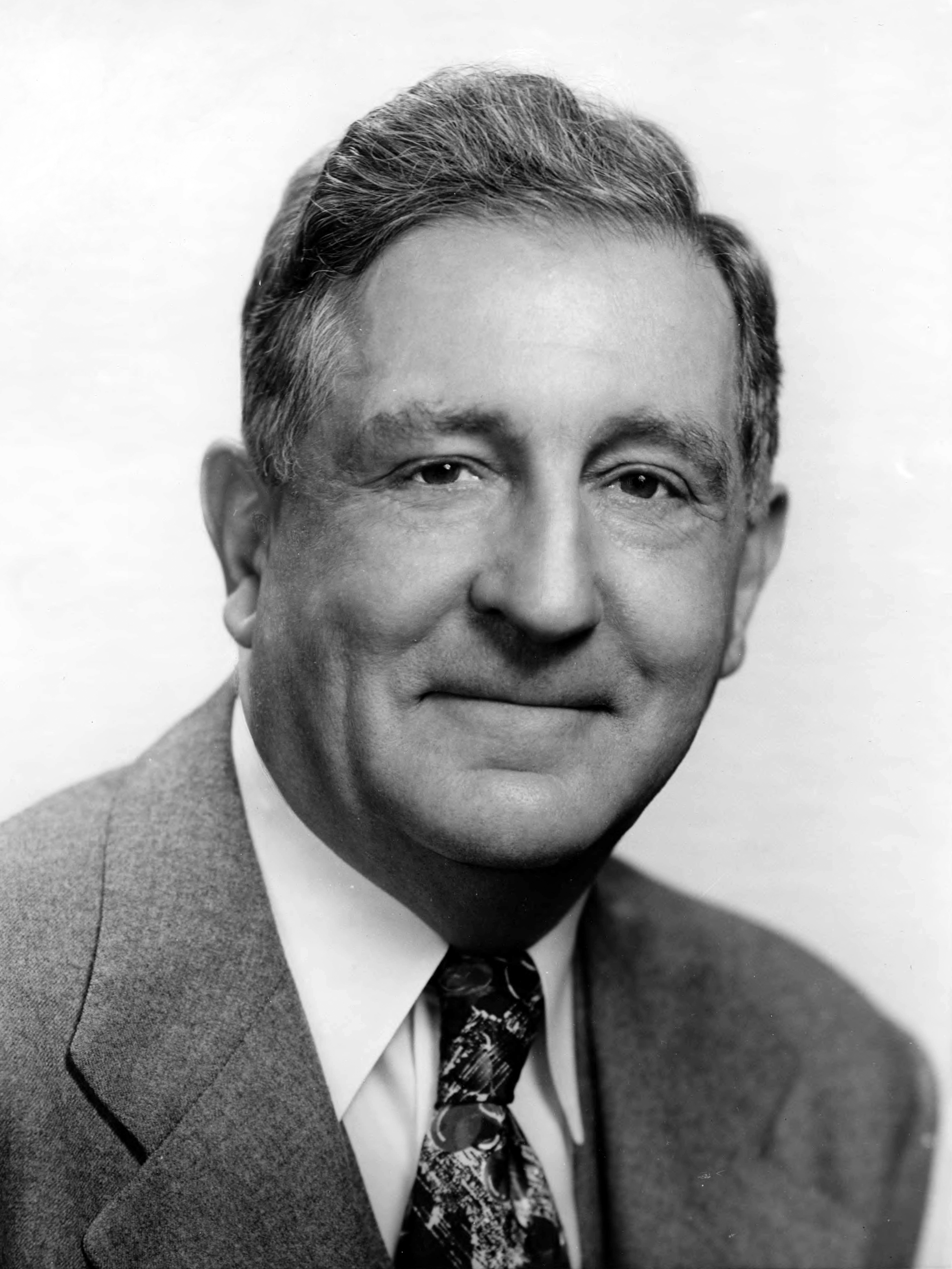

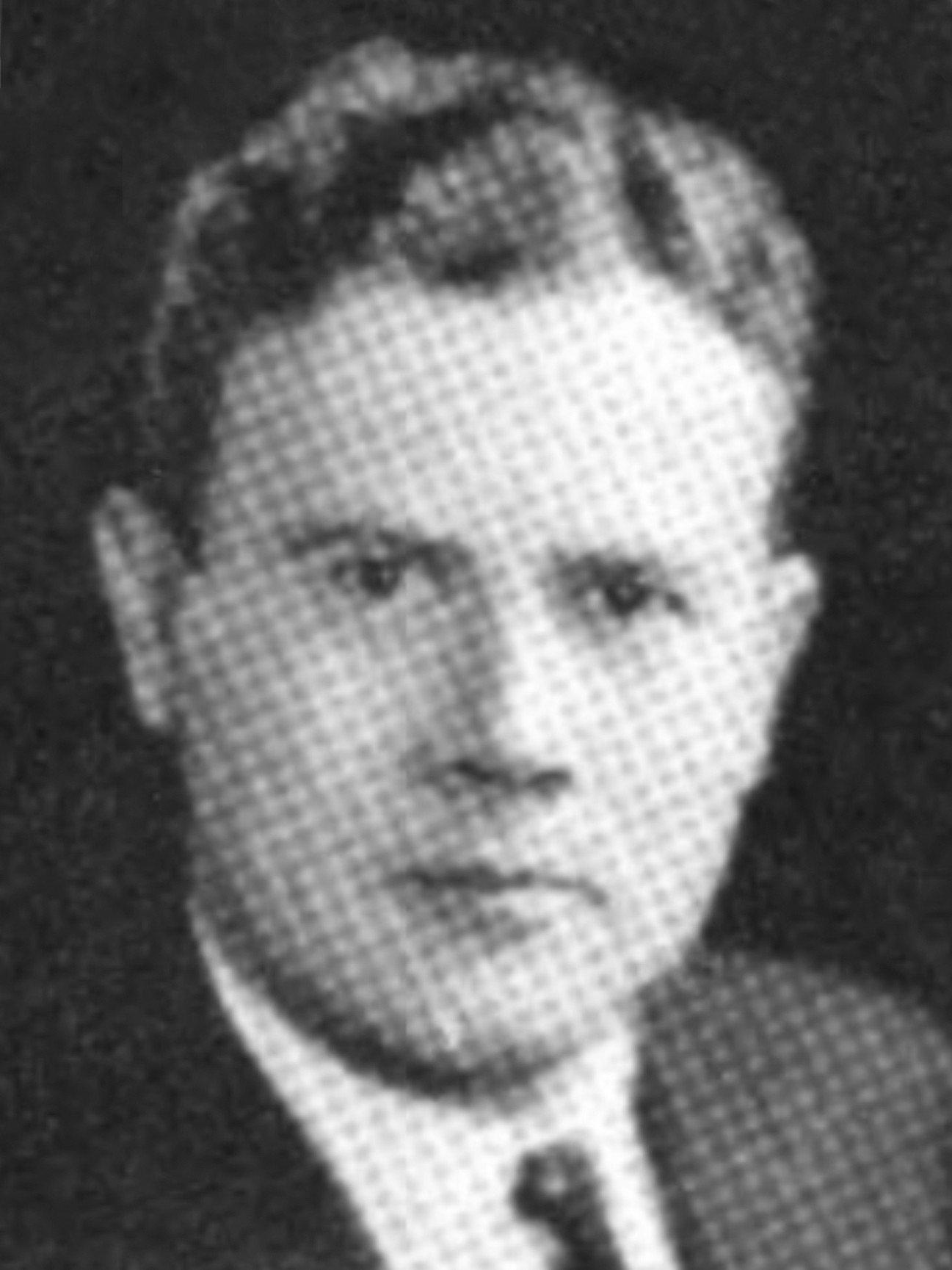
Nominee	Sheridan Downey	Frederick F. Houser
Party	Democratic	Republican
Alliance		Prohibition
Popular vote	1,728,155	1,576,553
Percentage	52.29%	47.71%
- Downey: 50–60% 60–70% Houser: 50–60% 60–70% Tie: 50%
U.S. senator before election
Sheridan Downey
Democratic
Elected U.S. Senator
Sheridan Downey
Democratic

California election
Party	Candidate	Votes	%
Democratic	Sheridan Downey (Incumbent)	1,728,155	52.29%
Republican	Frederick F. Houser	1,576,553	47.00%
None	Scattering	526	0.02%
Majority		151,602	5.29%
Turnout		3,305,234	
Democratic hold			

== Colorado ==
1944 United States Senate election in Colorado
- November 7, 1944
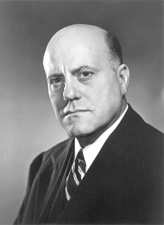
Nominee	Eugene Millikin	Barney L. Whatley
Party	Republican	Democratic
Popular vote	277,410	214,335
Percentage	56.06%	43.31%
- Results by county Millikin: 50–60% 60–70% 70–80% Whatley: 50–60% 60–70%
U.S. senator before election
Eugene Millikin
Republican
Elected U.S. Senator
Eugene Millikin
Republican

Colorado election
Party	Candidate	Votes	%
Republican	Eugene Millikin (Incumbent)	277,410	56.06%
Democratic	Barney L. Whatley	214,335	43.31%
Socialist	Carle Whitehead	3,143	0.64%
Majority		63,075	12.75%
Turnout		494,888	
Republican hold			

== Connecticut ==
1944 United States Senate election in Connecticut
- November 7, 1944
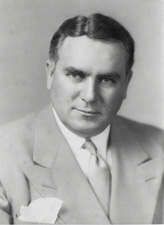

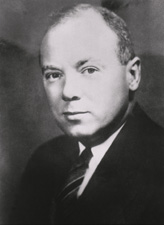
Nominee	Brien McMahon	John A. Danaher
Party	Democratic	Republican
Popular vote	430,716	391,748
Percentage	51.99%	47.28%
- McMahon: 50–60% 60–70% Danaher: 50–60% 60–70% 70–80% 80–90%
U.S. senator before election
John A. Danaher
Republican
Elected U.S. Senator
Brien McMahon
Democratic

Connecticut election
Party	Candidate	Votes	%
Democratic	Brien McMahon	430,716	51.99%
Republican	John A. Danaher (Incumbent)	391,748	47.28%
Socialist	Spender Anderson	6,033	0.73%
Majority		38,968	4.71%
Turnout		828,497	
Democratic gain from Republican			

== Florida ==
1944 United States Senate election in Florida
- November 7, 1944
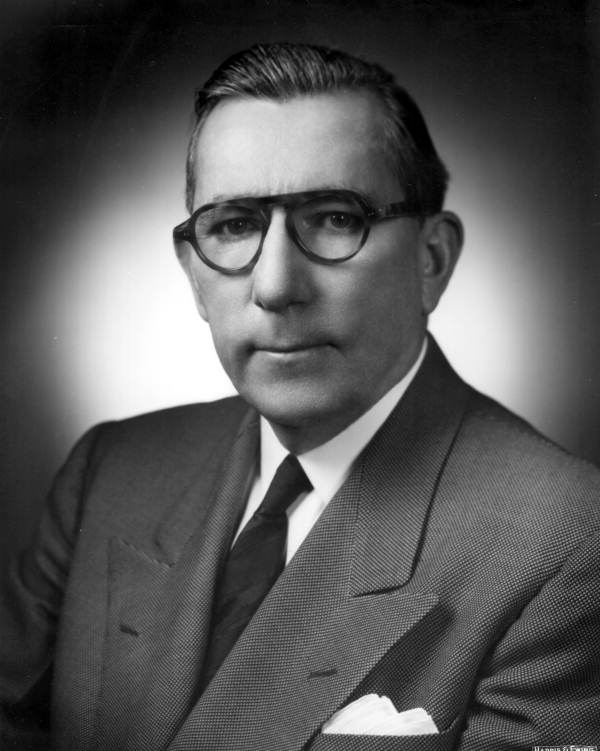

Nominee	Claude Pepper	Miles H. Draper
Party	Democratic	Republican
Popular vote	335,685	135,258
Percentage	71.28%	28.72%
- County results Pepper: 50–60% 60–70% 70–80% 80–90% >90%
Senator before election
Claude Pepper
Democratic
Elected Senator
Claude Pepper
Democratic

Florida election
Party	Candidate	Votes	%
Democratic	Claude Pepper (Incumbent)	335,685	71.28%
Republican	Miles H. Draper	135,258	28.72%
Majority		200,427	42.56%
Turnout		470,943	
Democratic hold			

== Georgia ==
Georgia election
Party	Candidate	Votes	%
Democratic	Walter F. George (Incumbent)	272,569	99.00%
None	Scattering	4	0.00%
Majority		272,565	100.00%
Turnout		272,573	
Democratic hold			

== Idaho ==
1944 United States Senate election in Idaho
- November 7, 1944
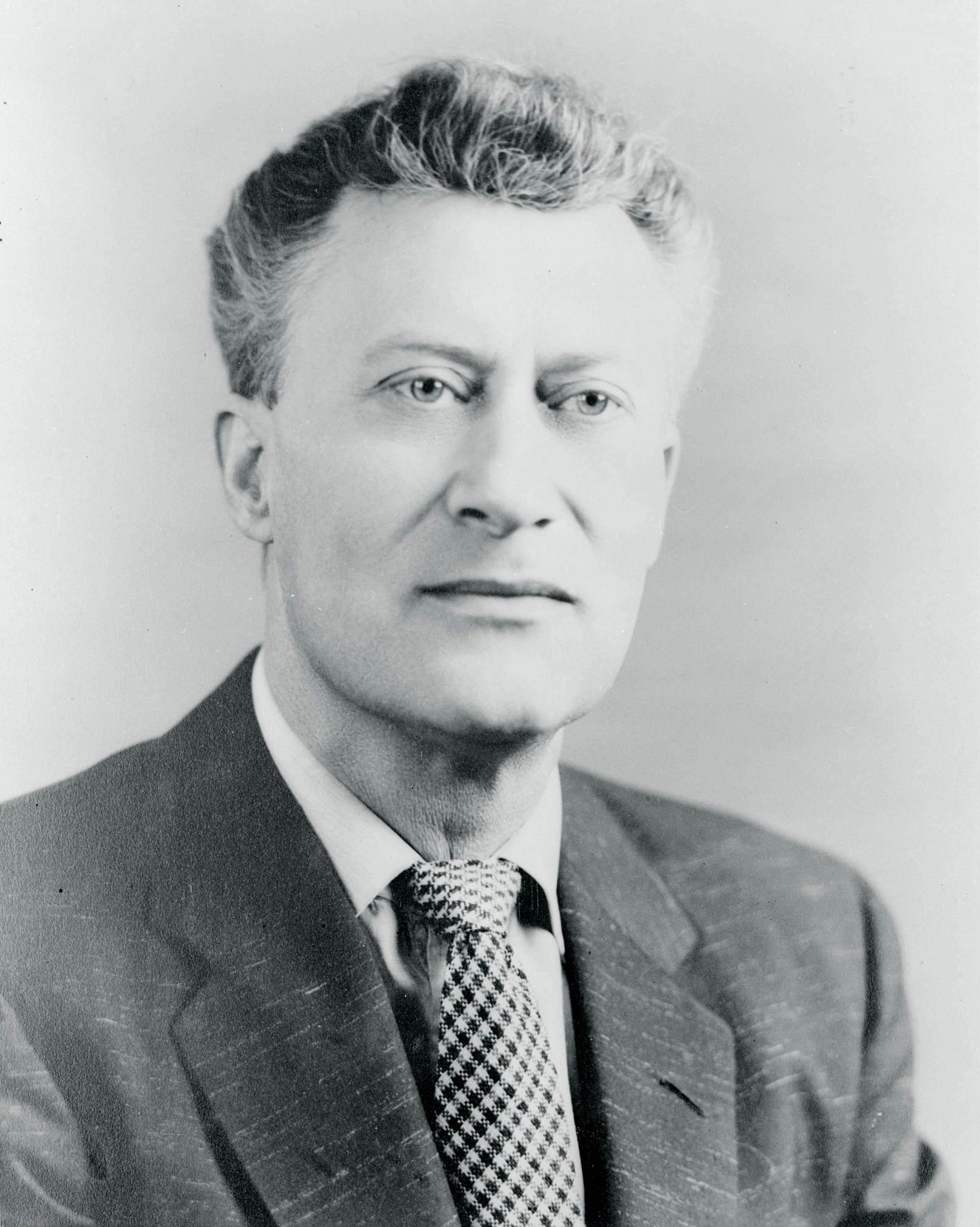

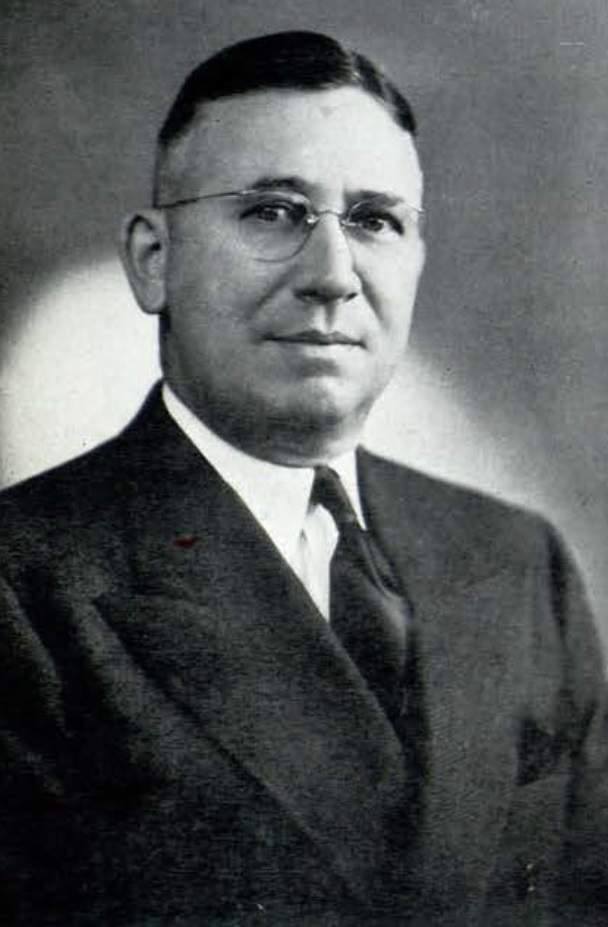
Nominee	Glen H. Taylor	C. A. Bottolfsen
Party	Democratic	Republican
Popular vote	107,096	102,373
Percentage	51.13%	48.87%
- County results Taylor: 50–60% 60–70% Bottolfsen: 50–60% 60–70%
U.S. senator before election
D. Worth Clark
Democratic
Elected U.S. Senator
Glen H. Taylor
Democratic

Idaho election
Party	Candidate	Votes	%
Democratic	Glen H. Taylor	107,096	51.13%
Republican	C. A. Bottolfsen	102,373	48.87%
Majority		4,723	2.26%
Turnout		209,469	
Democratic hold			

== Illinois ==
1944 United States Senate election in Illinois
- November 7, 1944
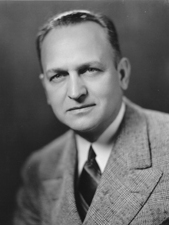

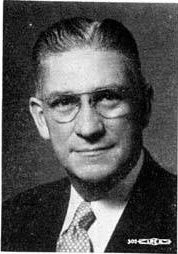
Nominee	Scott W. Lucas	Richard J. Lyons
Party	Democratic	Republican
Popular vote	2,059,023	1,841,793
Percentage	52.61%	47.06%
- County results Lucas: 40–50% 50–60% 60–70% Lyons: 40–50% 50–60% 60–70% 70–80%
Senator before election
Scott W. Lucas
Democratic
Elected Senator
Scott W. Lucas
Democratic

Illinois election
Party	Candidate	Votes	%
Democratic	Scott W. Lucas (Incumbent)	2,059,023	52.61%
Republican	Richard J. Lyons	1,841,793	47.06%
Socialist Labor	Frank Schnur	7,312	0.19%
Prohibition	Enoch A. Holtwick	5,798	0.15%
Majority		217,230	5.55%
Turnout		3,913,926	
Democratic hold			

== Indiana ==
There were 2 elections in Indiana, due to the January 25, 1944, death of Democrat Frederick Van Nuys.

Democrat Samuel D. Jackson was appointed to continue the term, pending a special election. Republican William E. Jenner won the special election to finish the term, and Republican Homer E. Capehart won the general election to the next term.

=== Indiana (special) ===
1944 United States Senate election in Indiana
- November 7, 1944
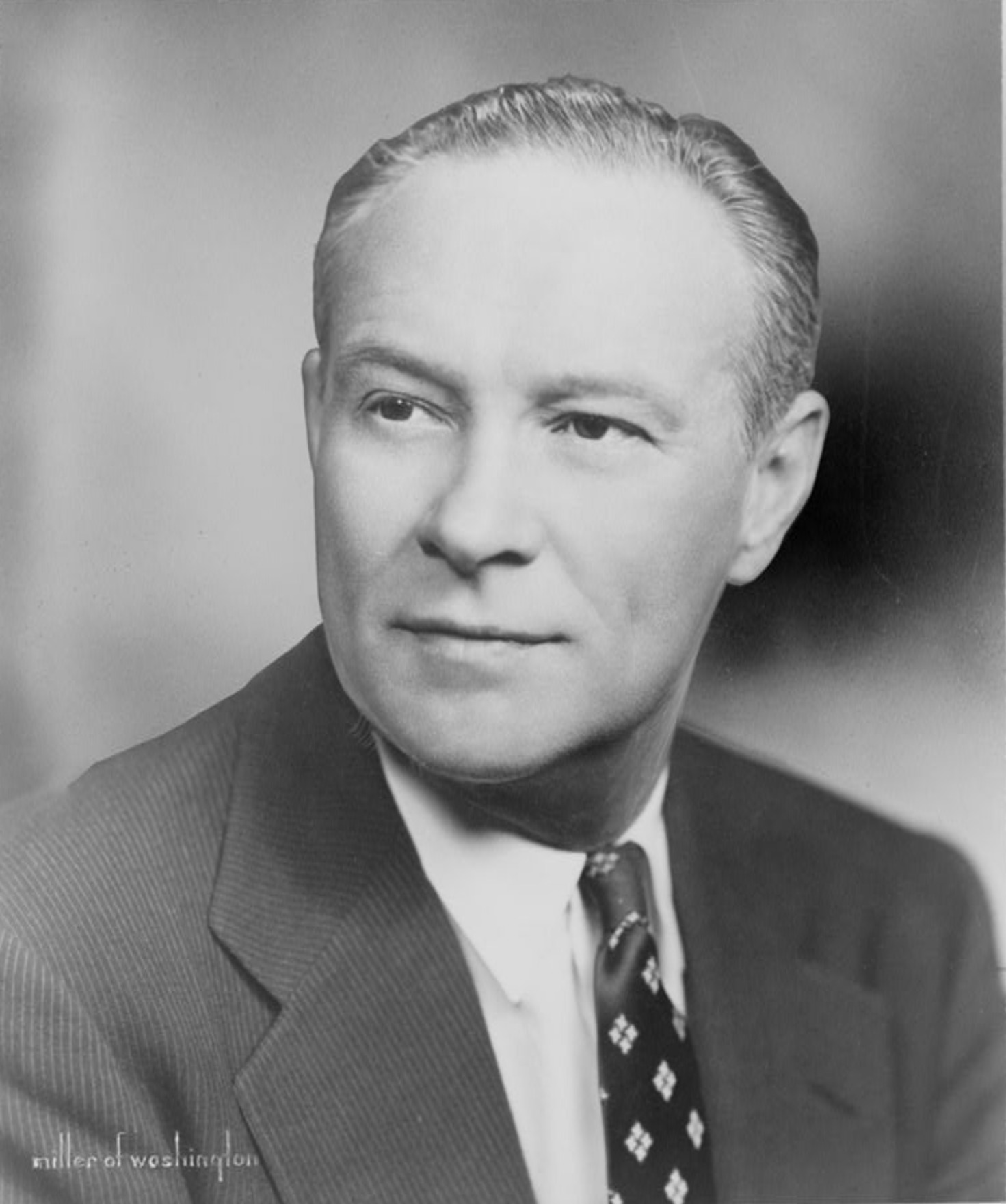
Nominee	William E. Jenner	Cornelius O’Brien
Party	Republican	Democratic
Popular vote	857,250	775,417
Percentage	52.11%	47.14%
- County results Jenner: 40–50% 50–60% 60–70% 70–80% O' Brien: 40–50% 50–60% 60–70%
U.S. senator before election
Samuel D. Jackson
Democratic
Elected U.S. Senator
William E. Jenner
Republican

Indiana special election
Party	Candidate	Votes	%
Republican	William E. Jenner	857,250	52.11%
Democratic	Cornelius O’Brien	775,417	47.14%
Prohibition	Carl W. Thompson	12,349	0.75%
Majority		81,833	4.97%
Turnout		1,645,016	
Republican hold			

=== Indiana (regular) ===
1944 United States Senate election in Indiana
- November 7, 1944
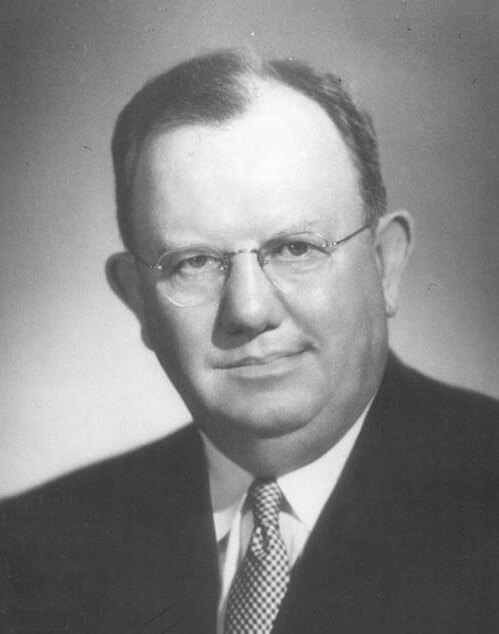

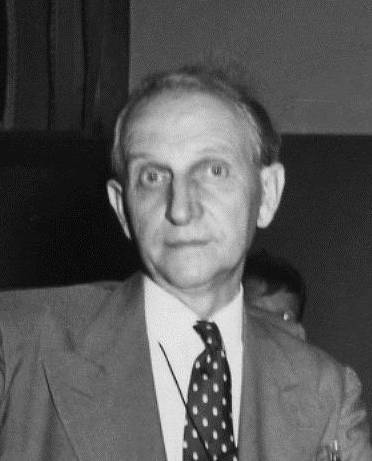
Nominee	Homer Capehart	Henry F. Schricker
Party	Republican	Democratic
Popular vote	829,489	807,766
Percentage	50.23%	48.91%
- County results Capehart: 40–50% 50–60% 60–70% Schricker: 40–50% 50–60% 60–70%
U.S. senator before election
Samuel D. Jackson
Democratic
Elected U.S. Senator
Homer Capehart
Republican

Indiana election
Party	Candidate	Votes	%
Republican	Homer E. Capehart	829,489	50.23%
Democratic	Henry F. Schricker	807,766	48.91%
Prohibition	George W. Holston	12,213	0.74%
Socialist	Marid B. Tomish	1,917	0.12%
Majority		21,723	1.32%
Turnout		1,651,385	
Republican gain from Democratic			

== Iowa ==
1944 United States Senate election in Iowa
- November 7, 1944
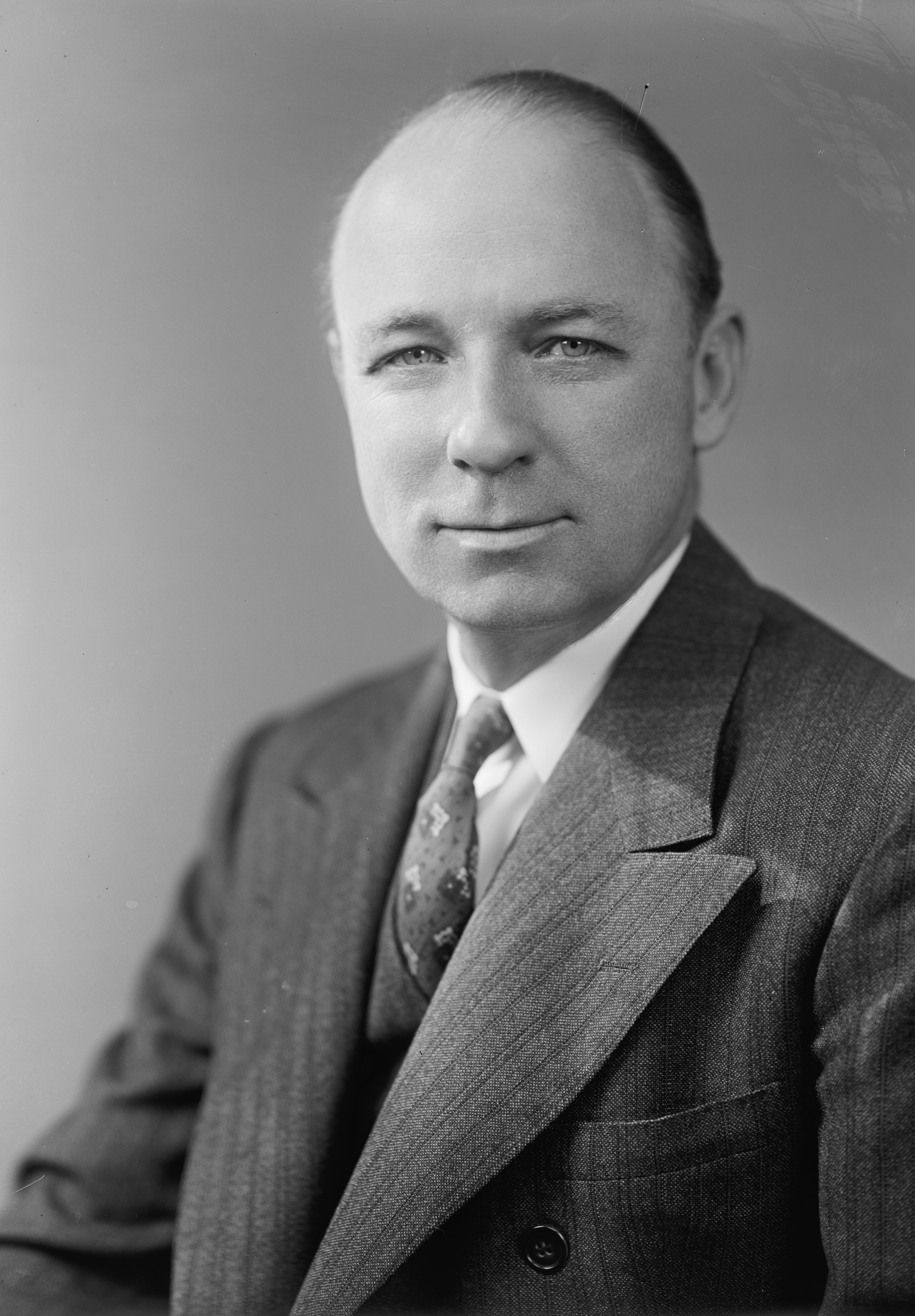

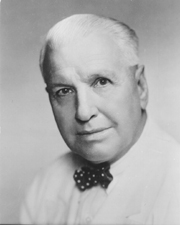
Nominee	Bourke B. Hickenlooper	Guy M. Gillette
Party	Republican	Democratic
Popular vote	523,963	494,229
Percentage	51.28%	48.37%
- Hickenlooper: 40–50% 50–60% 60–70% Gillette: 40–50% 50–60%
U.S. senator before election
Guy M. Gillette
Democratic
Elected U.S. Senator
Bourke B. Hickenlooper
Republican

Iowa election
Party	Candidate	Votes	%
Republican	Bourke B. Hickenlooper	523,963	51.28%
Democratic	Guy Gillette (Incumbent)	494,229	48.37%
Prohibition	W. S. Bowden	2,751	0.27%
Socialist	C. W. Drescher	744	0.07%
Majority		29,734	2.91%
Turnout		1,021,687	
Republican gain from Democratic			

== Kansas ==
1944 United States Senate election in Kansas
- November 7, 1944
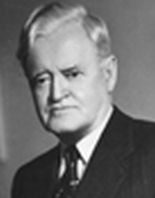
Nominee	Clyde M. Reed	Thurman Hill
Party	Republican	Democratic
Popular vote	387,090	272,053
Percentage	57.84%	40.65%
- County results Reed: 50–60% 60–70% 70–80% Hill: 50–60%
U.S. senator before election
Clyde M. Reed
Republican
Elected U.S. Senator
Clyde M. Reed
Republican

Kansas election
Party	Candidate	Votes	%
Republican	Clyde M. Reed (Incumbent)	387,090	57.84%
Democratic	Thurman Hill	272,053	40.65%
Prohibition	L. B. Dubbs	7,674	1.15%
Socialist	Arthur Goodwin Billings	2,374	0.35%
Majority		115,037	17.19%
Turnout		669,191	
Republican hold			

== Kentucky ==
1944 United States Senate election in Kentucky
- November 7, 1944
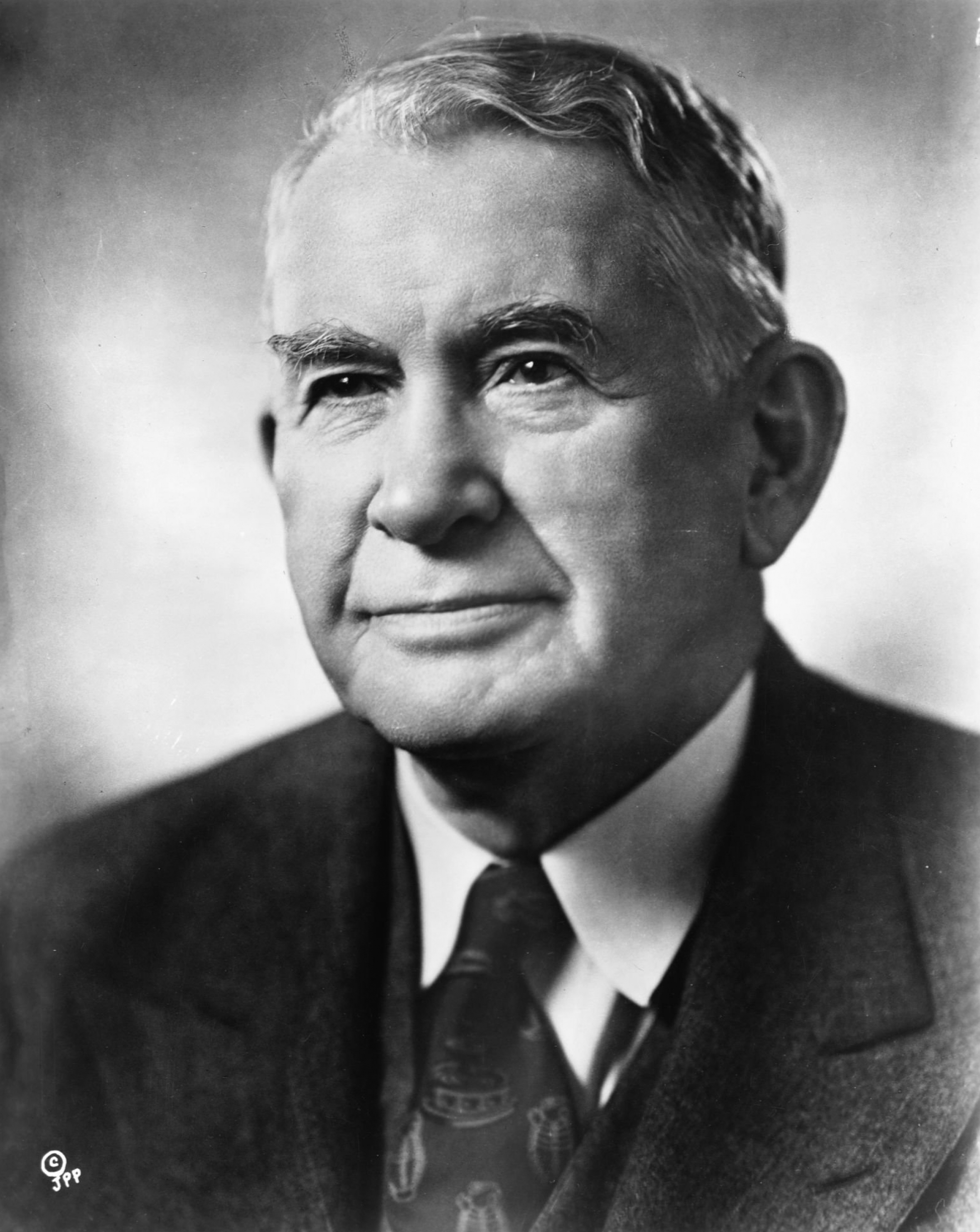

Nominee	Alben W. Barkley	James Park
Party	Democratic	Republican
Popular vote	464,053	380,425
Percentage	54.81%	44.93%
- County results Barkley: 50–60% 60–70% 70–80% 80–90% Park: 50–60% 60–70% 70–80% 80–90% >90%
U.S. senator before election
Alben W. Barkley
Democratic
Elected U.S. senator
Alben W. Barkley
Democratic

Kentucky election
Party	Candidate	Votes	%
Democratic	Alben W. Barkley (Incumbent)	464,053	54.81%
Republican	James Park	380,425	44.93%
Prohibition	Robert H. Garrison	1,808	0.21%
Socialist Labor	Yona M. Marret	340	0.04%
None	Scattering	1.15%	0.00%
Majority		83,628	9.88%
Turnout		846,627	
Democratic hold			

== Louisiana ==
1944 Democratic Senate primary election in Louisiana
- September 12, 1944
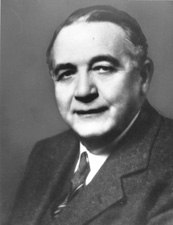

Nominee	John H. Overton	E. A. Stephens	Griffin Hawkins
Party	Democratic	Democratic	Democratic
Popular vote	151,886	68,408	19,067
Percentage	61.64%	27.76%	7.74%
- Parish results Overton: 30–40% 40–50% 50–60% 60–70% 70–80% 80–90% Stephens: 40–50% 50–60% 70–80% Hawkins: 40–50% 60–70%
U.S. senator before election
John H. Overton
Democratic
Elected U.S. Senator
John H. Overton
Democratic

Louisiana election
Party	Candidate	Votes	%
Democratic	John H. Overton (Incumbent)	287,365	99.99%
Independent	Maurice E. Clark	26	0.01%
Majority		287,339	99.98%
Turnout		287,391	
Democratic hold			

== Maryland ==
1944 United States Senate election in Maryland
- November 7, 1944
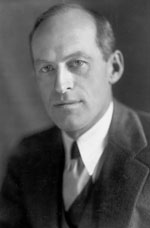

Nominee	Millard Tydings	Blanchard Randall
Party	Democratic	Republican
Popular vote	344,725	213,705
Percentage	61.73%	38.27%
- County results Randall: 50–60% 60–70% Tydings: 50–60% 60–70% 70–80%
U.S. senator before election
Millard Tydings
Democratic
Elected U.S. Senator
Millard Tydings
Democratic

Maryland election
Party	Candidate	Votes	%
Democratic	Millard Tydings (Incumbent)	344,725	61.73%
Republican	Blanchard Randall Jr.	213,705	38.27%
Majority		131,020	23.44%
Turnout		558,430	
Democratic hold			

== Massachusetts (special) ==
1944 United States Senate special election in Massachusetts
- November 7, 1944
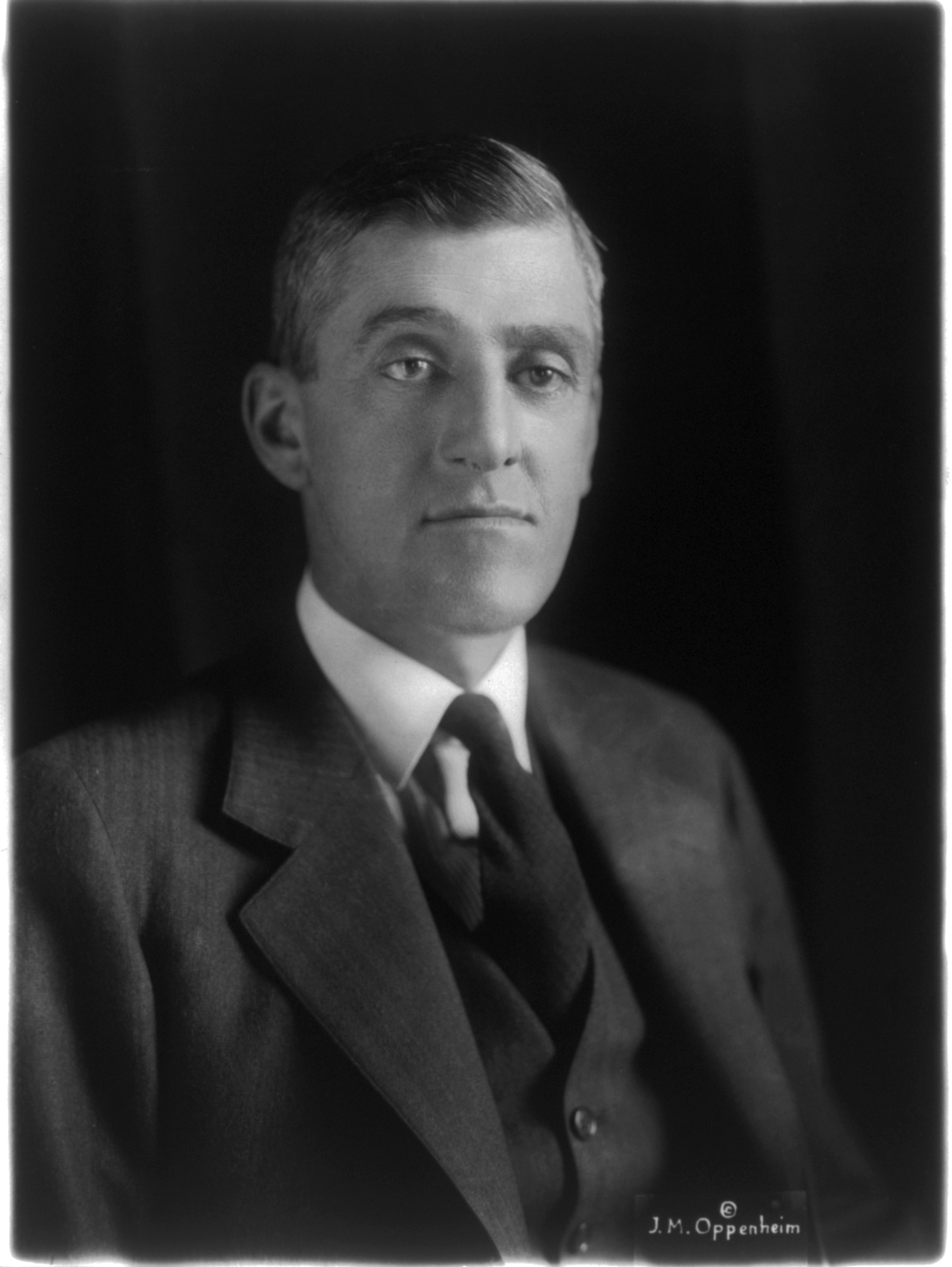

Nominee	Leverett Saltonstall	John H. Corcoran
Party	Republican	Democratic
Popular vote	1,228,754	667,086
Percentage	64.29%	34.90%

Saltonstall
40–50%
50–60%
60–70%
70–80%
80–90%
90–100%
Corcoran
50–60%
60–70%
70–80%
U.S. senator before election
Sinclair Weeks
Republican
Elected U.S. Senator
Leverett Saltonstall
Republican

Republican Henry Cabot Lodge Jr. resigned February 3, 1944, to return to active duty in the U.S. Army during World War II. Republican Sinclair Weeks was appointed February 8 to continue the term until an election was held. A special election was held on November 7 with Republican Massachusetts Governor Leverett Saltonstall defeating his challengers. He didn't take office until January 4, 1945, when his term as Governor ended.

Massachusetts special election
Party	Candidate	Votes	%	±%
Republican	Leverett Saltonstall	1,228,754	64.29%	+11.85%
Democratic	John H. Corcoran	667,086	34.90%	−11.71%
Socialist Labor	Bernard G. Kelly	12,296	0.64%	+0.29%
Prohibition	E. Tallmadge Root	3,269	0.17%	−0.09%
None	Scattering	17	0.00%	
Majority		561,668	29.38%	
Turnout		1,911,422		
Republican hold				

== Missouri ==
1944 United States Senate election in Missouri
- November 7, 1944
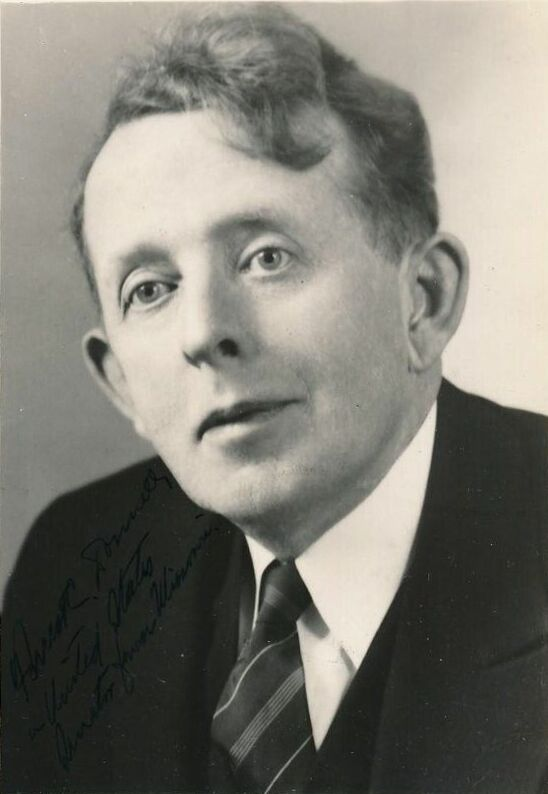
Nominee	Forrest C. Donnell	Roy McKittrick
Party	Republican	Democratic
Popular vote	778,778	776,790
Percentage	49.95%	49.82%
- County results Donnell: 50–60% 60–70% 70–80% 80–90% McKittrick: 50–60% 60–70% 70–80% 80–90%
U.S. senator before election
Bennett Champ Clark
Democratic
Elected U.S. senator
Forrest C. Donnell
Republican

Missouri election
Party	Candidate	Votes	%
Republican	Forrest C. Donnell	778,778	49.95%
Democratic	Roy McKittrick	776,790	49.82%
Socialist	D. B. Preisler	3,320	0.21%
Socialist Labor	William Wesley Cox	215	0.01%
Majority		1,988	0.13%
Turnout		1,559,103	
Republican gain from Democratic			

== Nevada ==
1944 United States Senate election in Nevada
- November 7, 1944
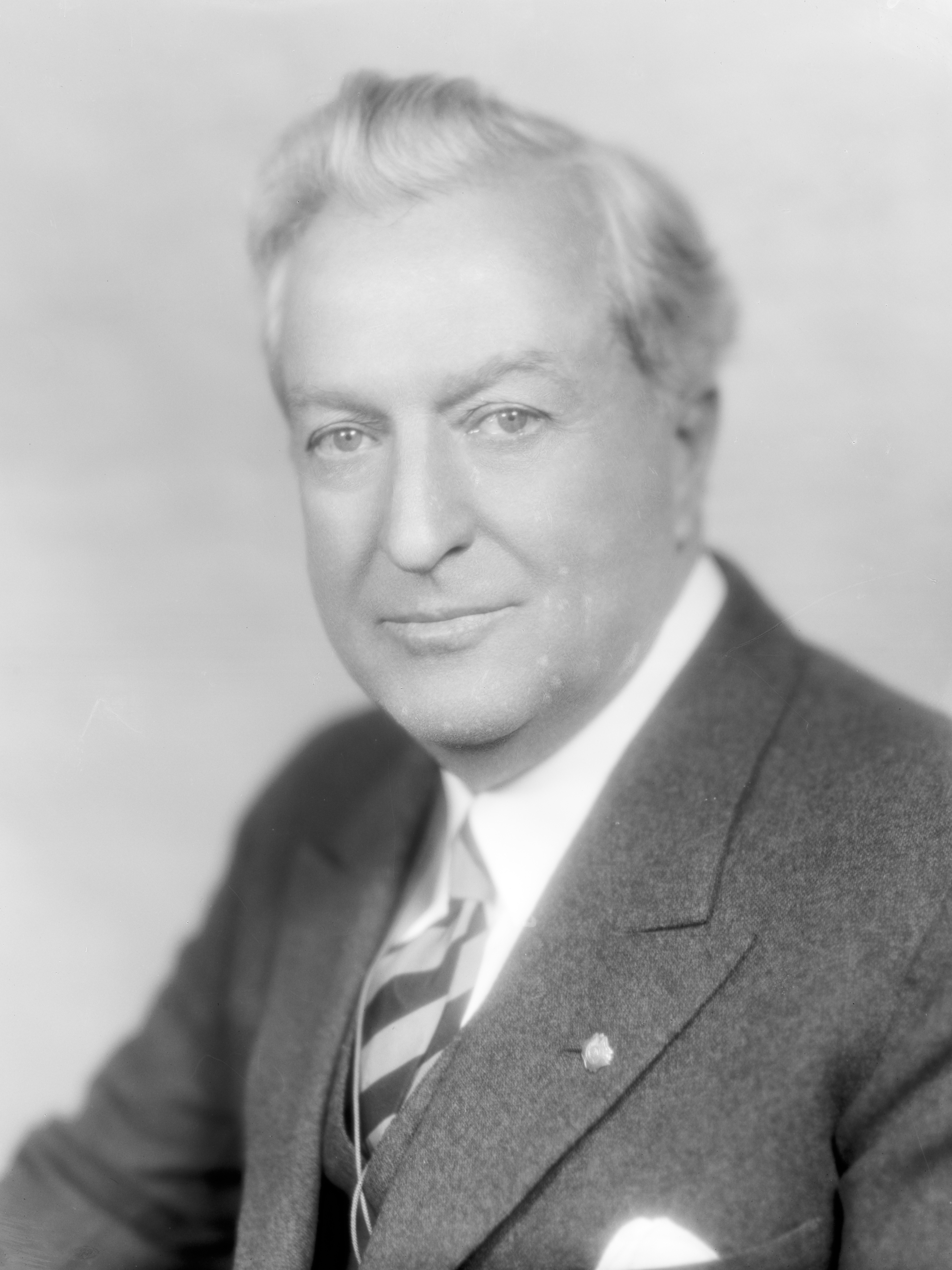

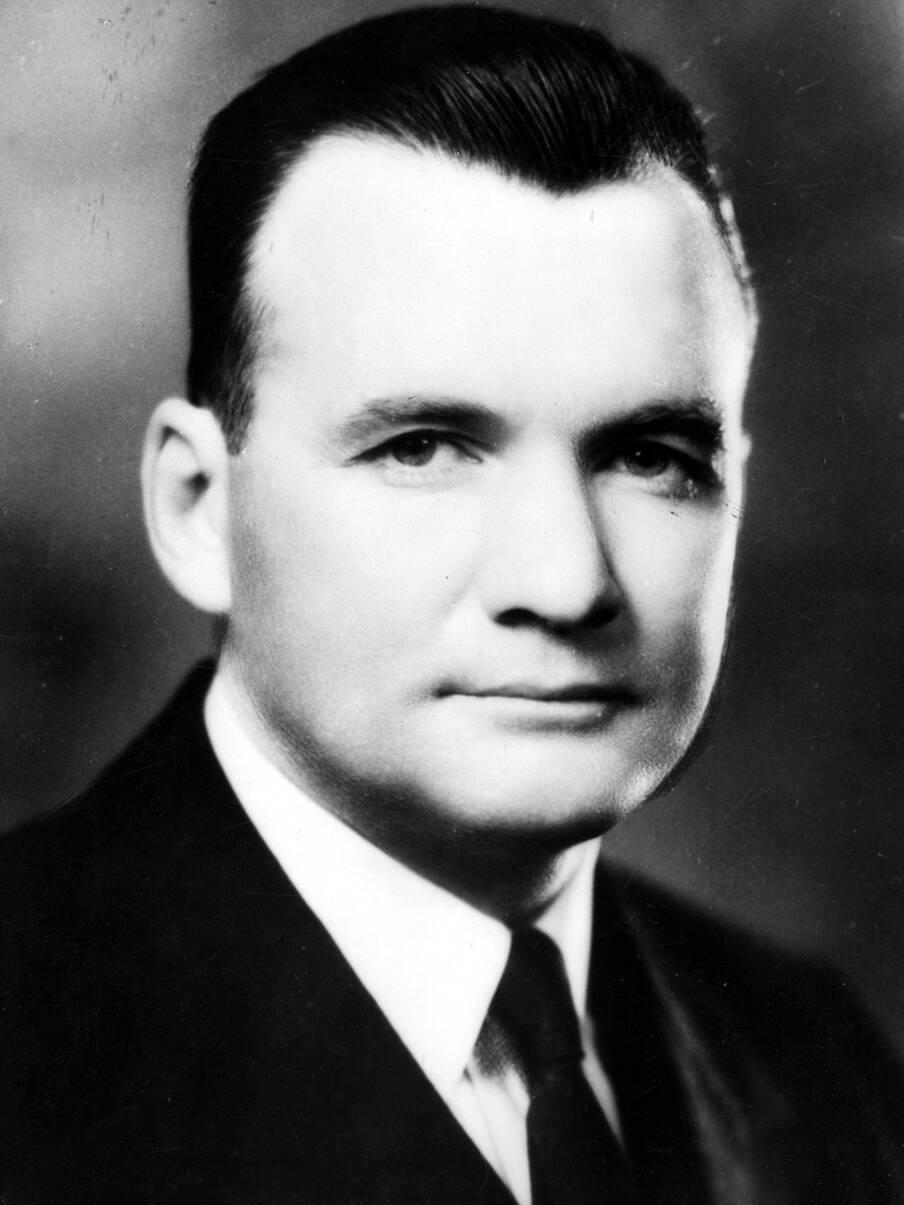
Nominee	Pat McCarran	George W. Malone
Party	Democratic	Republican
Popular vote	30,595	21,816
Percentage	58.38%	41.62%
- County results McCarran: 50–60% 60–70% Malone: 50–60%
U.S. senator before election
Pat McCarran
Democratic
Elected U.S. Senator
Pat McCarran
Democratic

Nevada election
Party	Candidate	Votes	%
Democratic	Pat McCarran (Incumbent)	30,595	58.38%
Republican	George W. Malone	21,816	41.62%
Majority		8,779	16.76%
Turnout		52,411	
Democratic hold			

== New Hampshire ==
1944 United States Senate election in New Hampshire
- November 7, 1944
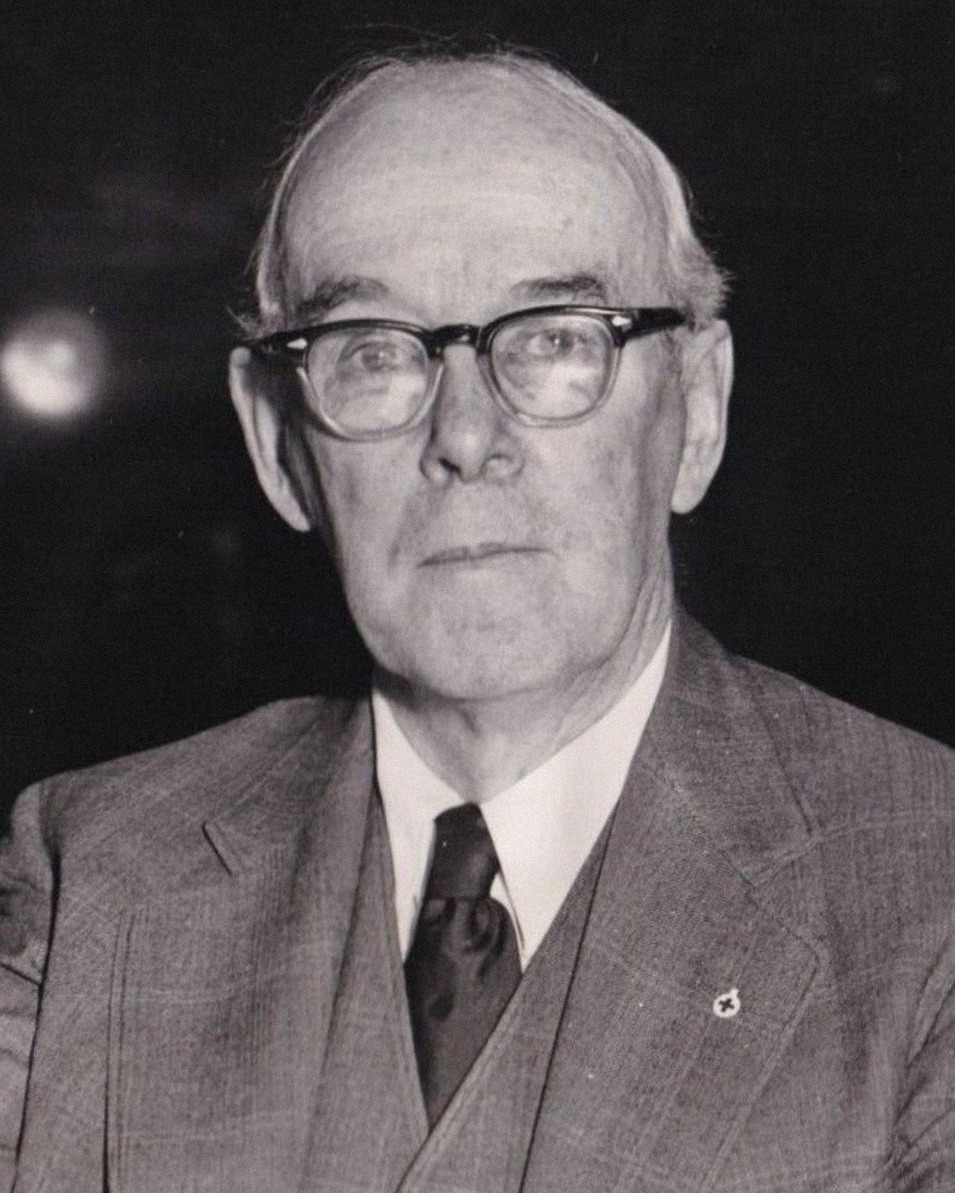
Nominee	Charles W. Tobey	Joseph J. Betley
Party	Republican	Democratic
Popular vote	110,549	106,508
Percentage	50.93%	49.07%
- Tobey: 50–60% 60–70% 70–80% 80–90% 90-100% Betley: 50–60% 60–70% 70–80% 80–90% Tie: 50%
Senator before election
Charles W. Tobey
Republican
Elected Senator
Charles W. Tobey
Republican

New Hampshire election
Party	Candidate	Votes	%
Republican	Charles W. Tobey (Incumbent)	110,549	50.93%
Democratic	Joseph J. Betley	106,508	49.07%
Majority		4,041	1.86%
Turnout		217,057	
Republican hold			

== New Jersey (special) ==
1944 United States Senate special election in New Jersey
- November 7, 1944
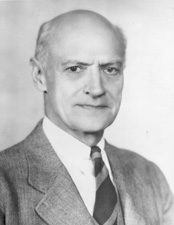

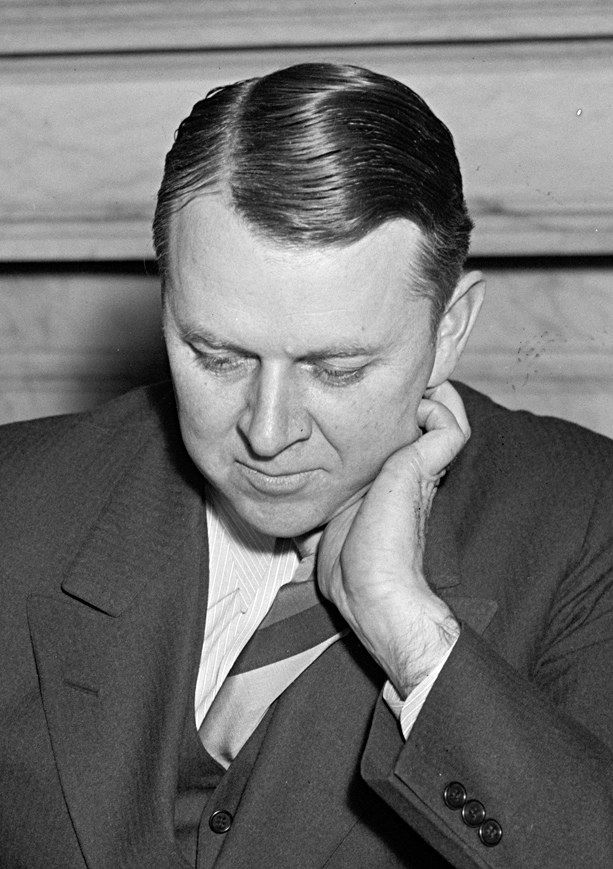
Nominee	H. Alexander Smith	Elmer H. Wene
Party	Republican	Democratic
Popular vote	939,987	910,096
Percentage	50.44%	48.84%
- County results Smith: 50–60% 60–70% Wene: 50–60% 60–70%
Senator before election
Arthur Walsh
Democratic
Elected Senator
H. Alexander Smith
Republican

New Jersey special election
Party	Candidate	Votes	%
Republican	H. Alexander Smith	940,051	50.44%
Democratic	Elmer H. Wene	910,096	48.84%
Prohibition	George W. Ridout	9,873	0.53%
Socialist Labor	John C. Butterworth	1,997	0.11%
Socialist	Morris Riger	1,593	0.09%
Majority		29,955	1.60%
Turnout		1,863,610	
Republican gain from Democratic			

== New York ==
1944 United States Senate election in New York
- November 8, 1944
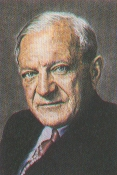

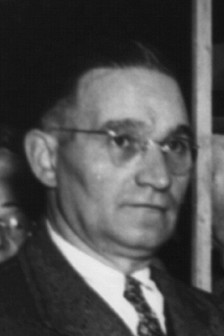
Nominee	Robert F. Wagner	Thomas J. Curran
Party	Democratic	Republican
Alliance	Parties: American Labor; Liberal
Popular vote	3,294,576	2,899,497
Percentage	53.06%	46.70%
- County Results; Wagner: 50–60% 60–70% Curran: 50–60% 60–70% 70–80%
Senator before election
Robert F. Wagner
Democratic
Elected Senator
Robert F. Wagner
Democratic

The Socialist Labor state convention met on April 2 at the Cornish Arms Hotel, the corner of Eighth Avenue and Twenty-eighth Street, in New York City. They nominated Eric Hass for the U.S. Senate. At that time, the party used the name "Industrial Government Party" on the ballot, but was also referred to as the "Industrial Labor Party".

The Liberal Party was organized by a state convention with about 1,100 delegates who met on May 19 and 20 at the Roosevelt Hotel in New York City. They endorsed the incumbent Democratic U.S. Senator Robert F. Wagner for re-election. The party filed a petition to nominate candidates which was allowed by Secretary of State Curran on August 25.

The Republican State Committee met on August 8 at Albany, New York. They nominated Secretary of State Thomas J. Curran for the U.S. Senate.

The Democratic State Committee met on August 8 at the National Democratic Club at 233, Madison Avenue in New York City. They re-nominated the incumbent U.S. Senator Robert F. Wagner.

The American Labor state convention met on August 10. They endorsed the Democratic nominee Wagner.

The Democratic/American Labor/Liberal ticket was elected and incumbent Wagner was re-elected.

Democratic	Robert F. Wagner	2,485,735
Republican	Thomas J. Curran	2,899,497
American Labor	Robert F. Wagner	483,785
Liberal	Robert F. Wagner	325,056
Industrial Government	Eric Hass	15,244

== North Carolina ==
1944 United States Senate election in North Carolina
- November 7, 1944
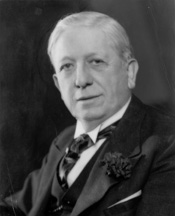

Nominee	Clyde R. Hoey	A.I. Ferree
Party	Democratic	Republican
Popular vote	533,813	226,037
Percentage	70.25%	29.75%
- County results Hoey: 50–60% 60–70% 70–80% 80–90% 90–100% Ferree: 50–60% 60–70% 70–80%
Senator before election
Robert Rice Reynolds
Democratic
Elected Senator
Clyde R. Hoey
Democratic

North Carolina election
Party	Candidate	Votes	%
Democratic	Clyde R. Hoey	533,813	70.25%
Republican	A. I. Ferree	226,037	29.75%
Majority		307,776	40.50%
Turnout		759,850	
Democratic hold			

== North Dakota ==
1944 United States Senate election in North Dakota
- November 7, 1944
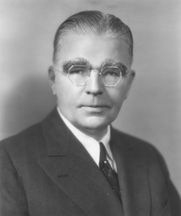

Nominee	John Moses	Gerald Nye	Lynn Stambaugh
Party	Democratic	Republican	Independent Republican
Popular vote	95,102	69,530	44,596
Percentage	45.20%	33.04%	21.19%
- County results Moses: 30–40% 40–50% 50–60% 60–70% Nye: 40–50% 50–60% 60–70% 80–90% Stambaugh: 30–40%
U.S. senator before election
Gerald Nye
Republican
Elected U.S. Senator
John Moses
Democratic

North Dakota election
Party	Candidate	Votes	%
Democratic	John Moses	95,102	45.20%
Republican	Gerald Nye (Incumbent)	69,530	33.04%
Independent	Lynn U. Stumbaugh	44,596	21.19%
Independent	Bernard J. O’Laughlin	705	0.34%
Prohibition	L. D. Harris	489	0.23%
Majority		25,572	12.16%
Turnout		210,422	
Democratic gain from Republican			

== Ohio ==
1944 United States Senate election in Ohio
- November 7, 1944
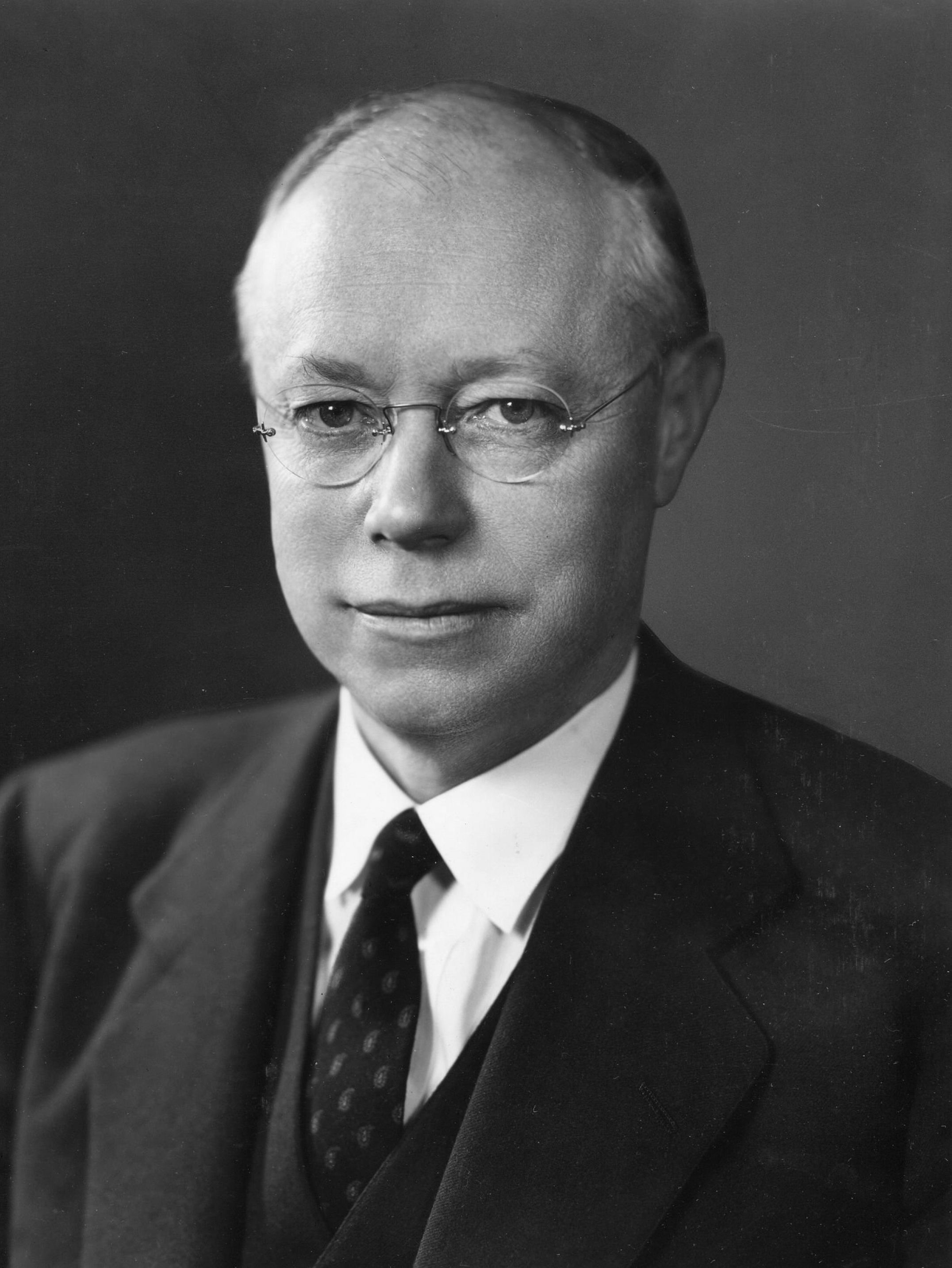

Nominee	Robert A. Taft	William Pickrel
Party	Republican	Democratic
Popular vote	1,500,609	1,482,610
Percentage	50.30%	49.70%
- County results Taft: 50–60% 60–70% 70–80% Pickrel: 50–60% 60–70%
U.S. senator before election
Robert A. Taft
Republican
Elected U.S. Senator
Robert A. Taft
Republican

Ohio election
Party	Candidate	Votes	%
Republican	Robert A. Taft (Incumbent)	1,500,609	50.30%
Democratic	William G. Pickrel	1,482,610	49.70%
Majority		17,999	0.60%
Turnout		2,983,219	
Republican hold			

== Oklahoma ==
1944 United States Senate election in Oklahoma
- November 7, 1944
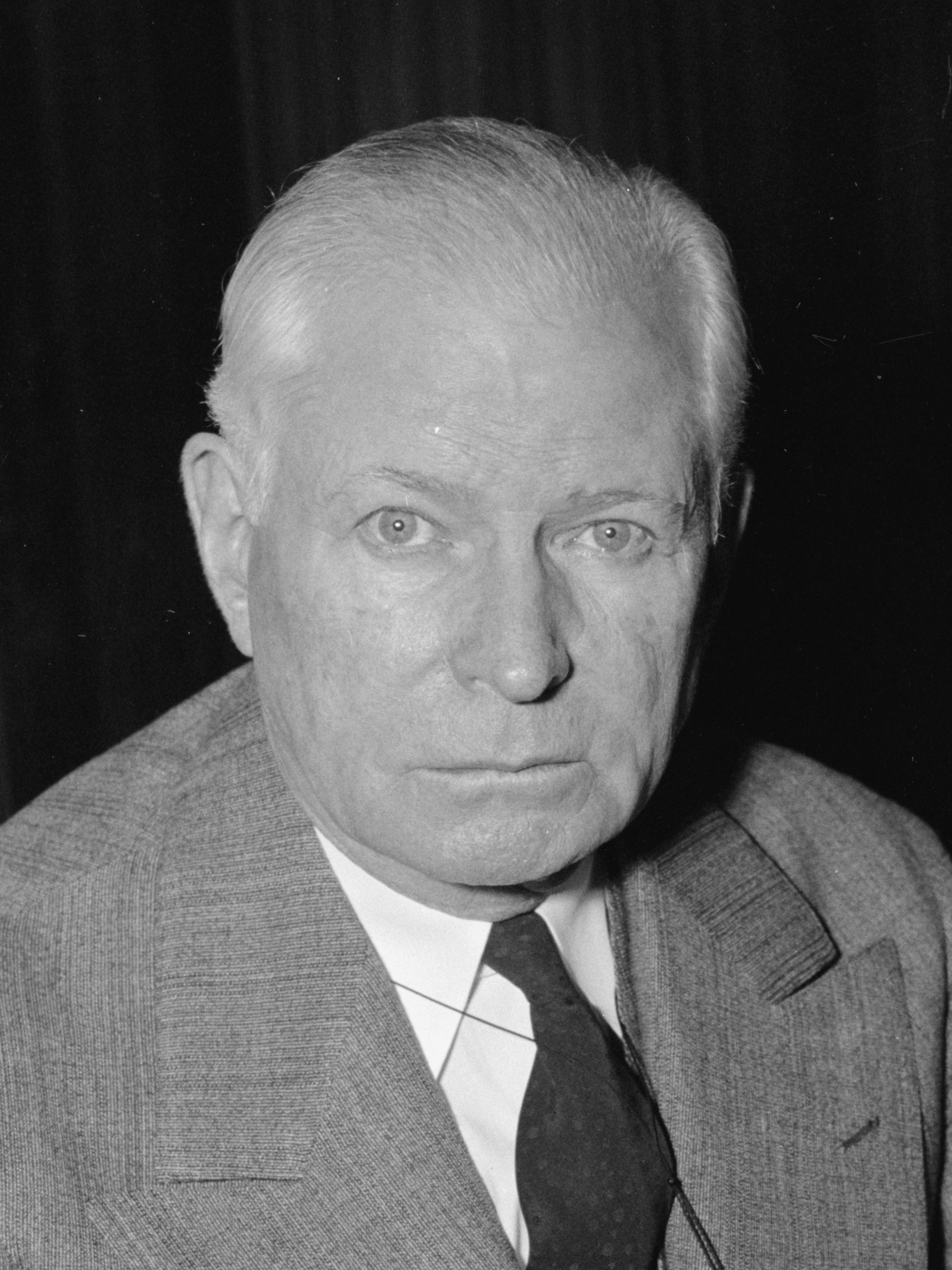

Nominee	Elmer Thomas	William Otjen
Party	Democratic	Republican
Popular vote	390,851	309,222
Percentage	55.65%	44.02%
- County results Thomas: 50–60% 60–70% 70–80% 80–90% Otjen: 40–50% 50–60% 60–70% 70–80%
U.S. senator before election
Elmer Thomas
Democratic
Elected U.S. Senator
Elmer Thomas
Democratic

Oklahoma election
Party	Candidate	Votes	%
Democratic	Elmer Thomas (Incumbent)	390,851	55.65%
Republican	William Otjen	309,222	44.02%
Independent	Paul V. Beck	1,128	0.16%
Independent	T. B. Williams	674	0.10%
Independent	Paul R. Nagle	519	0.07%
Majority		81,629	11.63%
Turnout		702,394	
Democratic hold			

== Oregon ==
=== Oregon (special) ===
1944 United States Senate special election in Oregon
- November 7, 1944
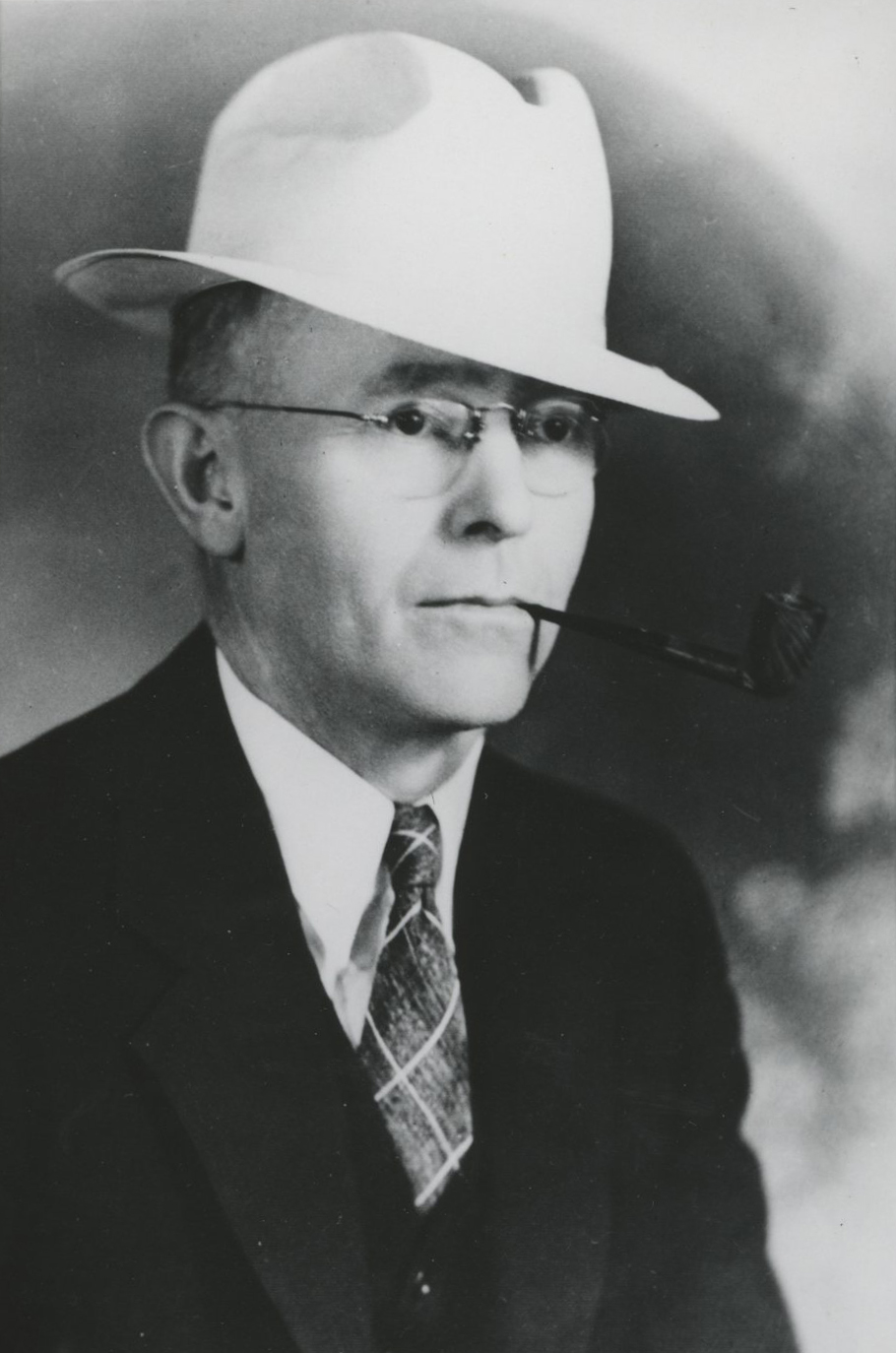

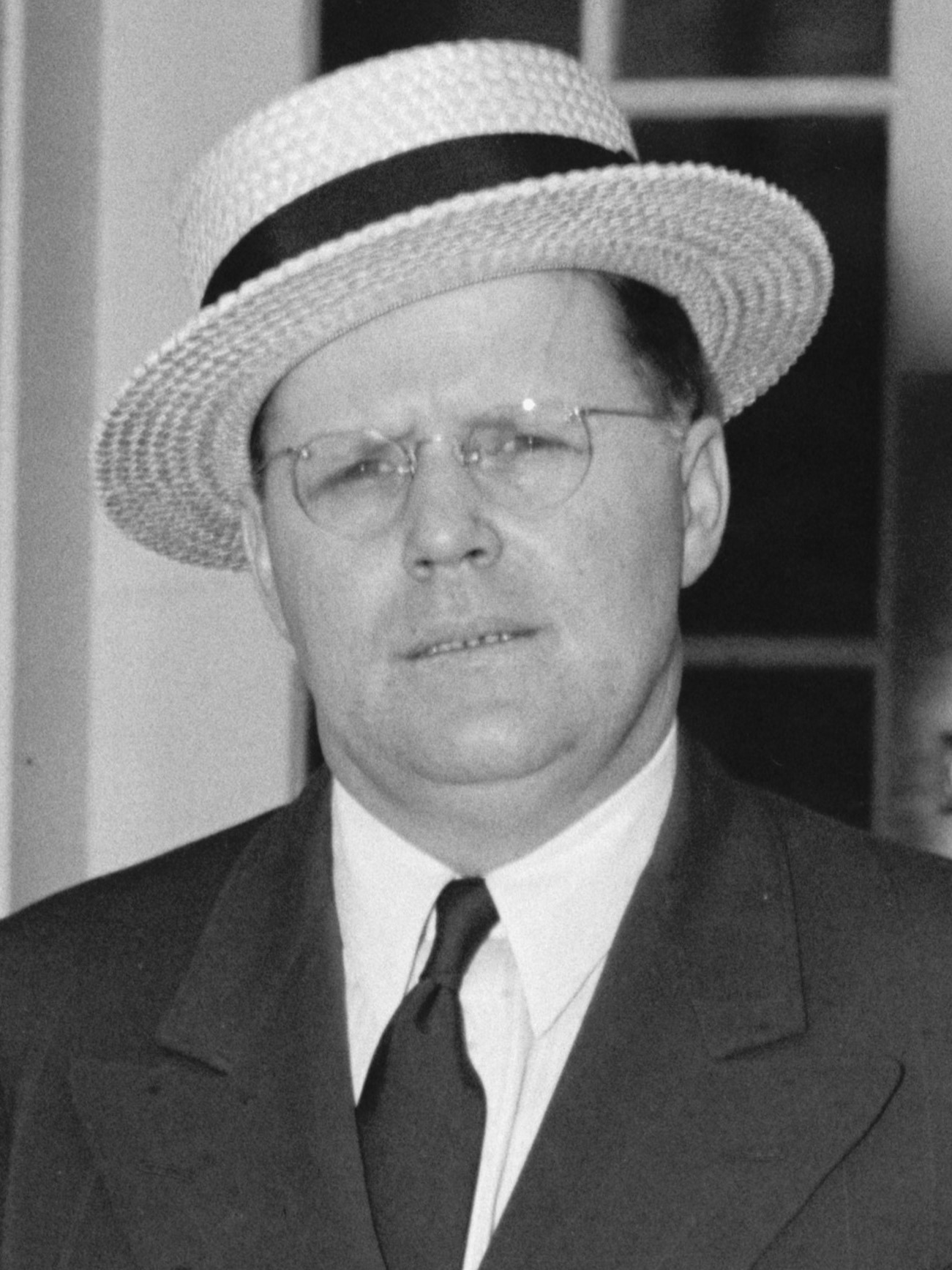
Nominee	Guy Cordon	Willis Mahoney
Party	Republican	Democratic
Popular vote	260,631	192,305
Percentage	57.54%	42.46%
- County results Cordon: 50–60% 60–70% 70–80% Mahoney: 50–60%
U.S. senator before election
Guy Cordon
Republican
Elected U.S. Senator
Guy Cordon
Republican

Oregon special election
Party	Candidate	Votes	%
Republican	Guy Cordon (Incumbent)	260,631	57.54%
Democratic	Willis Mahoney	192,305	42.46%
Majority		68,326	15.08%
Turnout		452,936	
Republican hold			

=== Oregon (regular) ===
1944 United States Senate election in Oregon
- November 7, 1944
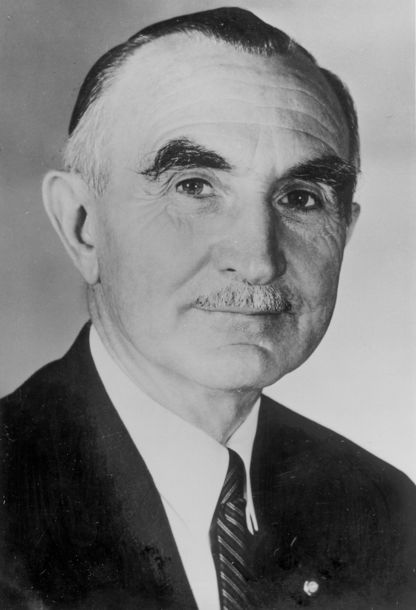

Nominee	Wayne Morse	Edgar W. Smith
Party	Republican	Democratic
Popular vote	269,095	174,140
Percentage	60.71%	39.29%
- County results Morse: 50–60% 60–70% 70–80%
U.S. senator before election
Rufus C. Holman
Republican
Elected U.S. Senator
Wayne Morse
Republican

Incumbent Republican Rufus C. Holman ran for re-election, but was defeated in the Republican primary by Wayne Morse.

Oregon election
Party	Candidate	Votes	%
Republican	Wayne Morse	269,095	60.71%
Democratic	Edgar W. Smith	174,140	39.29%
Majority		94,955	21.42%
Turnout		443,235	
Republican hold			

== Pennsylvania ==
1944 United States Senate election in Pennsylvania
- November 7, 1944
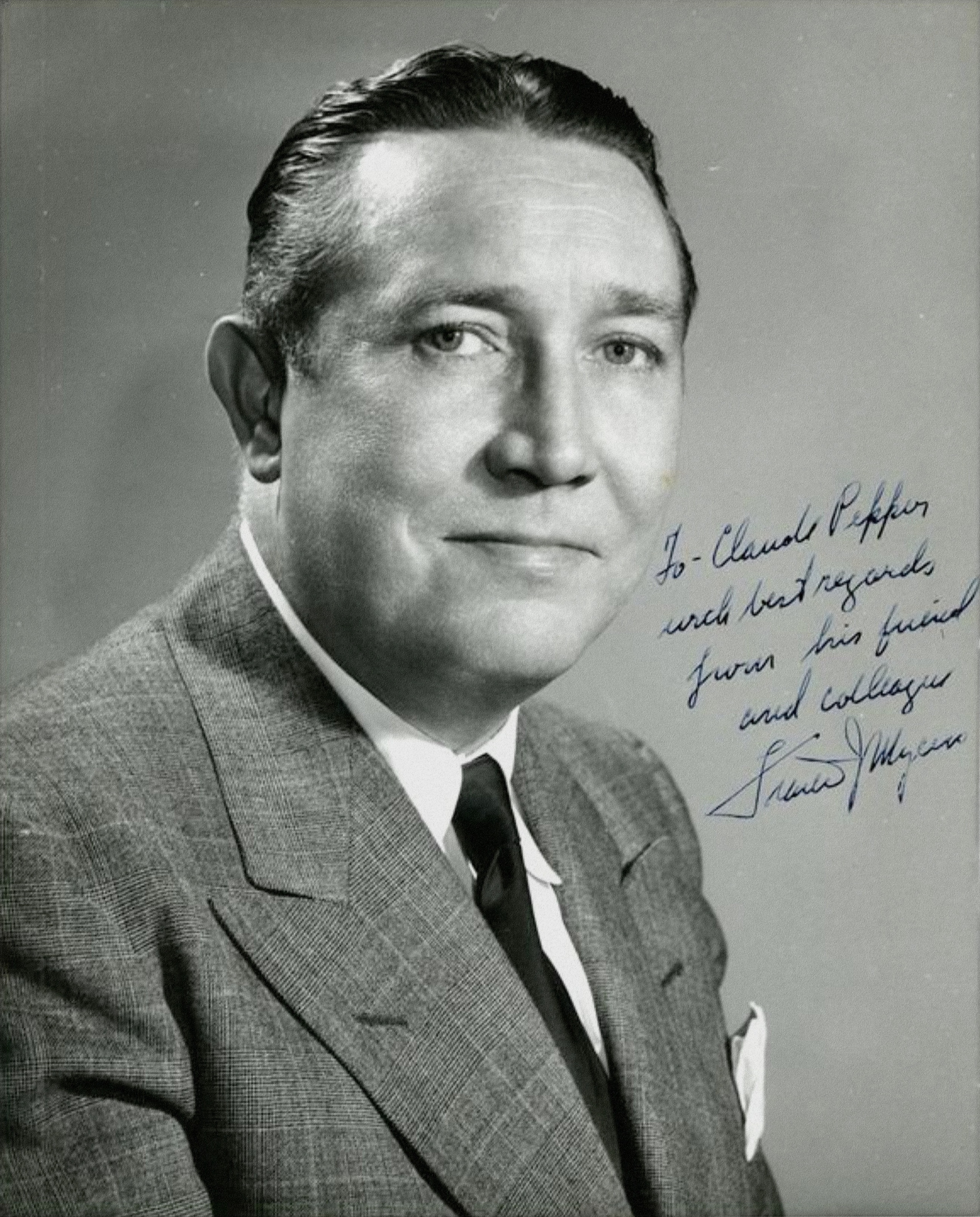

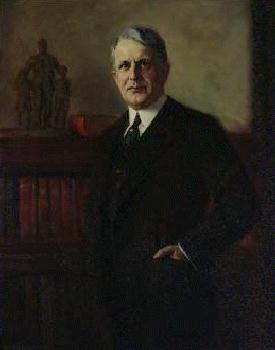
Nominee	Francis J. Myers	James J. Davis
Party	Democratic	Republican
Popular vote	1,864,622	1,840,938
Percentage	49.99%	49.35%
- County results Myers: 50–60% 60–70% Davis: 50–60% 60–70% 70–80%
U.S. senator before election
James J. Davis
Republican
Elected U.S. Senator
Francis J. Myers
Democratic

General election results
Party	Candidate	Votes	%
Democratic	Francis J. Myers	1,864,622	49.99%
Republican	James J. Davis (Incumbent)	1,840,938	49.35%
Socialist	J. Henry Stump	14,129	0.38%
Prohibition	Charles Palmer	8,599	0.23%
Socialist Labor	Frank Knotek	1,989	0.05%
Majority		23,684	0.64%
Turnout		3,730,277	
Democratic gain from Republican			

== South Carolina ==
1944 Democratic Senate primary election in South Carolina
- July 25, 1944
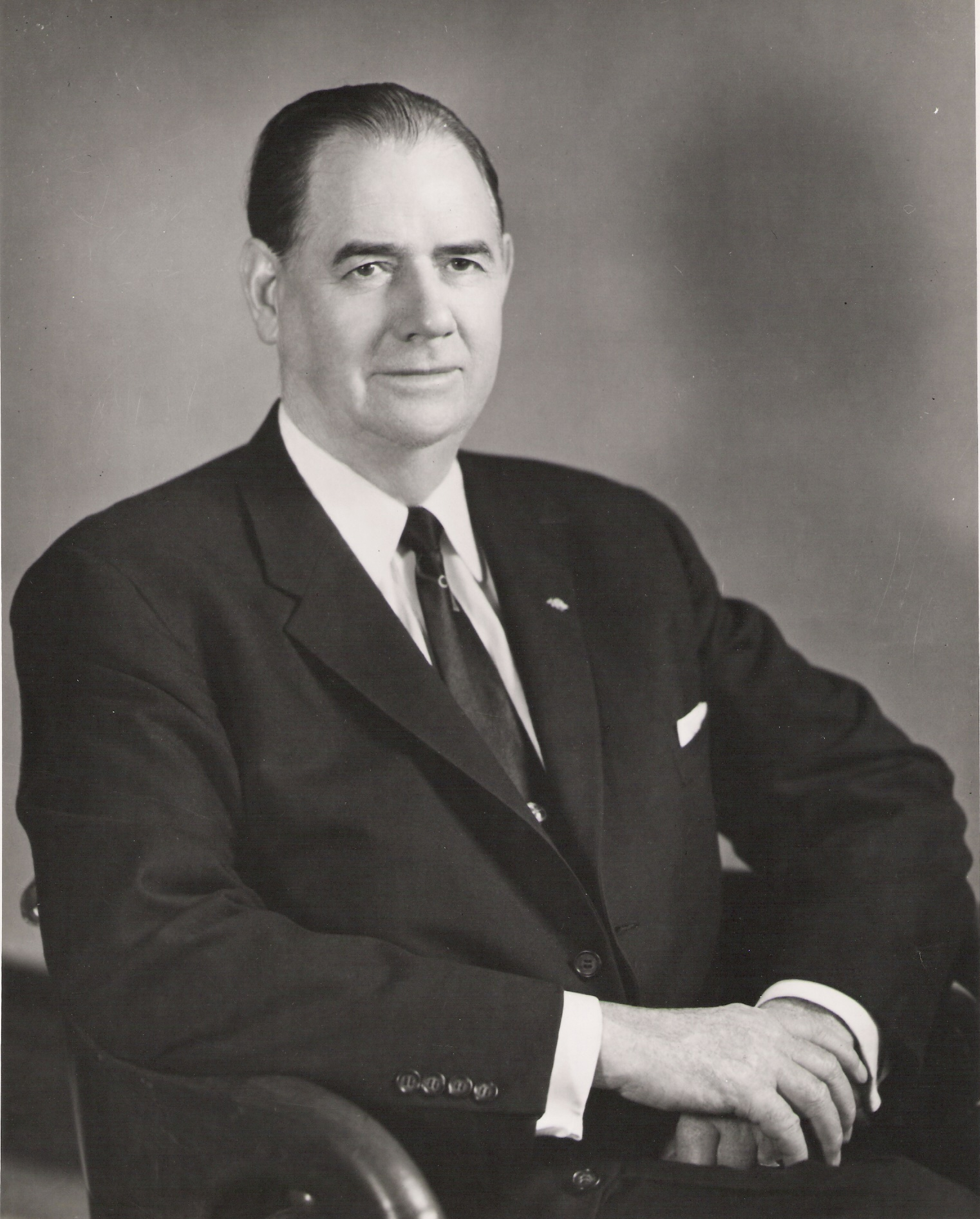

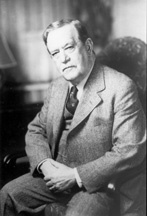
Nominee	Olin D. Johnston	Ellison D. Smith
Party	Democratic	Democratic
Popular vote	138,440	88,085
Percentage	55.20%	35.12%
- County results Johnston: 30–40% 40–50% 50–60% 60–70% 70–80% Smith: 30–40% 50–60%
U.S. senator before election
Ellison D. Smith
Democratic
Elected U.S. Senator
Olin D. Johnston
Democratic

South Carolina U.S. Senate Election, 1944
Party	Candidate	Votes	%	±%
Democratic	Olin D. Johnston	94,556	92.94%	
Republican	James B. Gaston	3,807	3.74%	
Progressive Democratic	Osceola E. McKaine	3,214	3.16%	3.16%
Prohibition	B. L. Hendrix	141	0.14%	
No party	Write-Ins	18	0.00%	0.00%
Majority		90,749	89.20%	
Turnout		101,736		
Democratic hold		Swing		

== South Dakota ==
1944 United States Senate election in South Dakota
- November 7, 1944
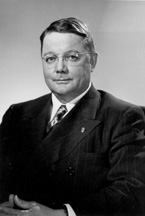

Nominee	Chan Gurney	George M. Bradshaw
Party	Republican	Democratic
Popular vote	145,248	82,199
Percentage	63.86%	36.14%
- County results Gurney: 50–60% 60–70% 70–80% 80–90% Bradshaw: 50–60% 70–80%
U.S. senator before election
Chan Gurney
Republican
Elected U.S. Senator
Chan Gurney
Republican

South Dakota election
Party	Candidate	Votes	%
Republican	John Chandler Gurney (Incumbent)	145,248	63.86%
Democratic	George M. Bradshaw	82,199	36.14%
Majority		63,049	27.72%
Turnout		227,447	
Republican hold			

== Utah ==
1944 United States Senate election in Utah
- November 7, 1944
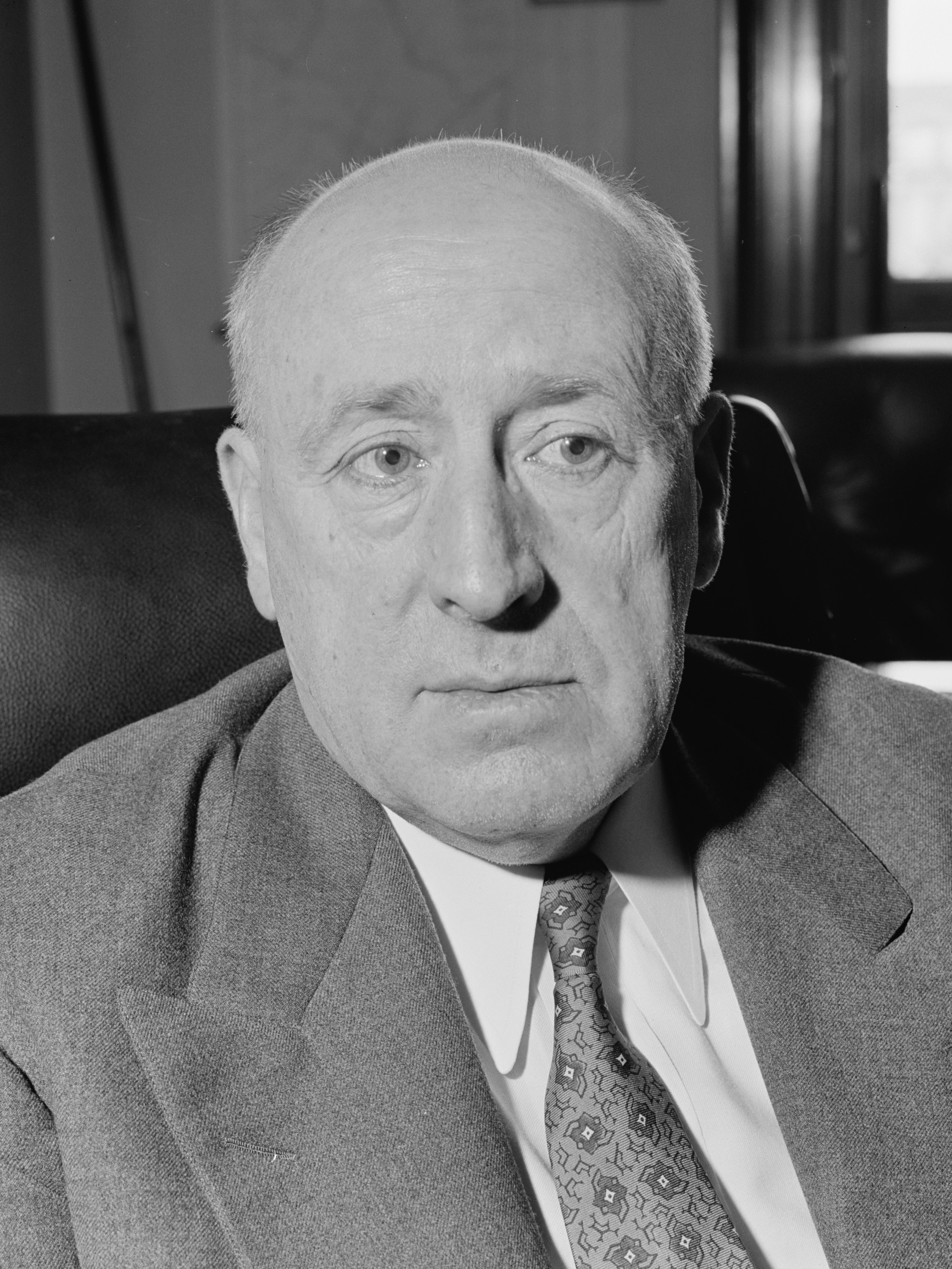

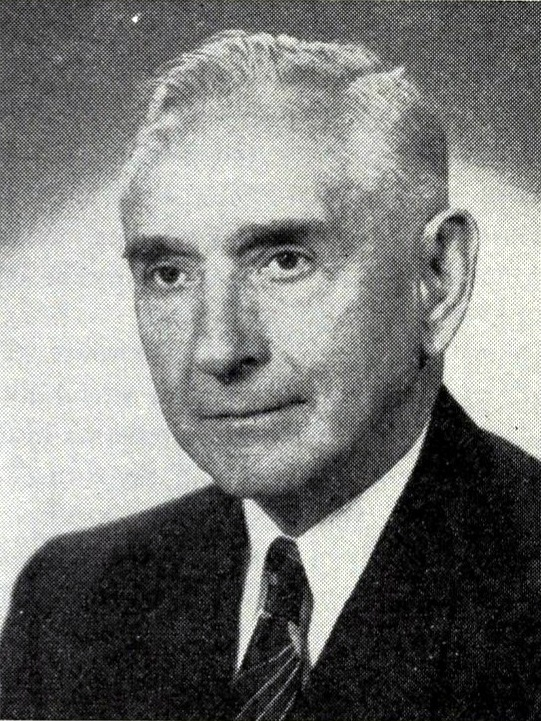
Nominee	Elbert D. Thomas	Adam S. Bennion
Party	Democratic	Republican
Popular vote	148,748	99,532
Percentage	59.91%	40.09%
- County results Thomas: 50–60% 60–70% Bennion: 50–60% 60–70% 70–80%
U.S. senator before election
Elbert D. Thomas
Democratic
Elected U.S. Senator
Elbert D. Thomas
Democratic

Incumbent Democratic Senator Elbert D. Thomas won a third term. As of 2022, this is the last time that a Democrat was elected to Utah's class 3 Senate seat.

Utah election
Party	Candidate	Votes	%
Democratic	Elbert D. Thomas (Incumbent)	148,748	59.91%
Republican	Adam S. Bennion	99,532	40.09%
Majority		49,216	19.82%
Turnout		248,280	
Democratic hold			

== Vermont ==
1944 United States Senate election in Vermont
- November 7, 1944
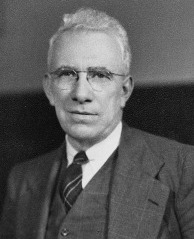

Nominee	George Aiken	Harry Witters
Party	Republican	Democratic
Popular vote	81,094	42,136
Percentage	65.81%	34.19%
- Aiken: 50–60% 60–70% 70–80% 80–90% 90–100% Witters: 50–60% 60–70% 80–90%
U.S. senator before election
George Aiken
Republican
Elected U.S. Senator
George Aiken
Republican

1944 United States Senate election in Vermont
Party	Candidate	Votes	%
Republican	George Aiken (Incumbent)	81,094	65.80%
Democratic	Harry W. Witters	42,136	34.19%
None	Scattering	18	0.01%
Majority		38,958	31.61%
Turnout		123,248	
Republican hold			

== Washington ==
1944 United States Senate election in Washington
- November 7, 1944
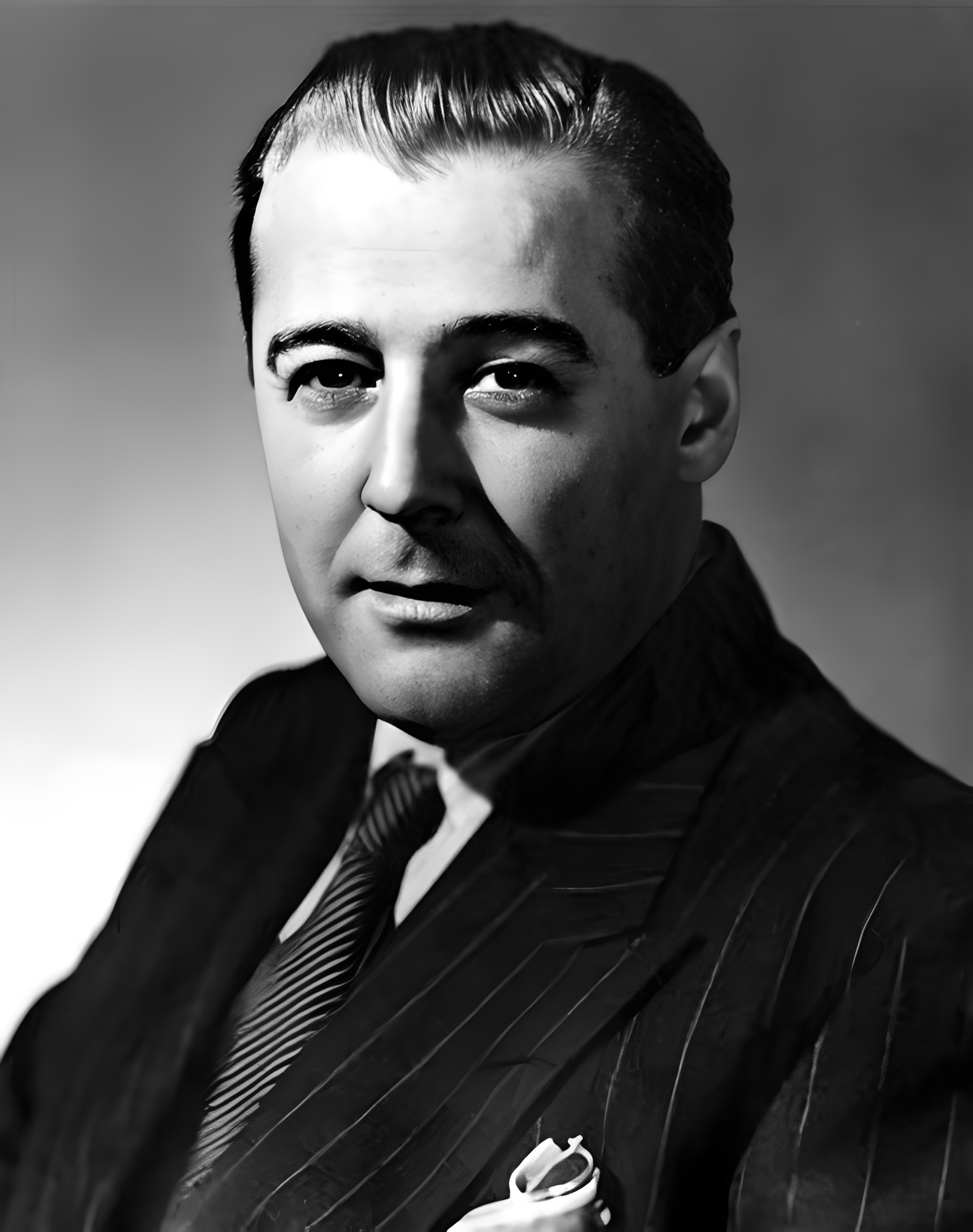

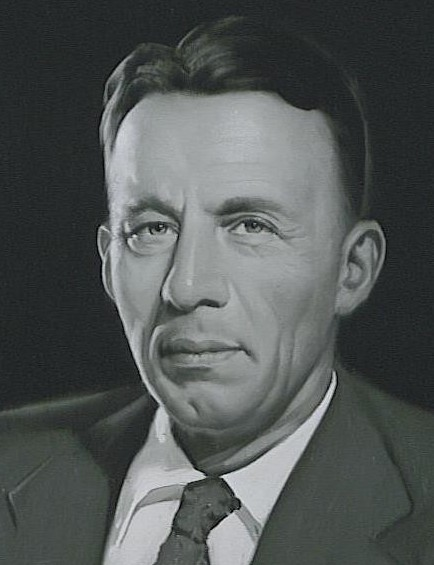
Nominee	Warren Magnuson	Harry P. Cain
Party	Democratic	Republican
Popular vote	397,719	342,464
Percentage	55.13%	44.44%
- Results by county Magnuson: 50–60% 60–70% Cain: 50–60% 60–70%
U.S. senator before election
Homer Bone (Note: Bone resigned from office on April 1 to take his commission as a federal judge on the Ninth Circuit Court of Appeals.)
Democratic
Elected U.S. Senator
Warren Magnuson
Democratic

Washington election
Party	Candidate	Votes	%
Democratic	Warren Magnuson	452,013	55.13%
Republican	Harry P. Cain	364,356	44.44%
Socialist	Ray C. Roberts	1,912	0.23%
Prohibition	Josephine B. Sulston	1,598	0.19%
Majority		87,657	10.69%
Turnout		819,879	
Democratic hold			

== Wisconsin ==
1944 United States Senate election in Wisconsin
- November 7, 1944
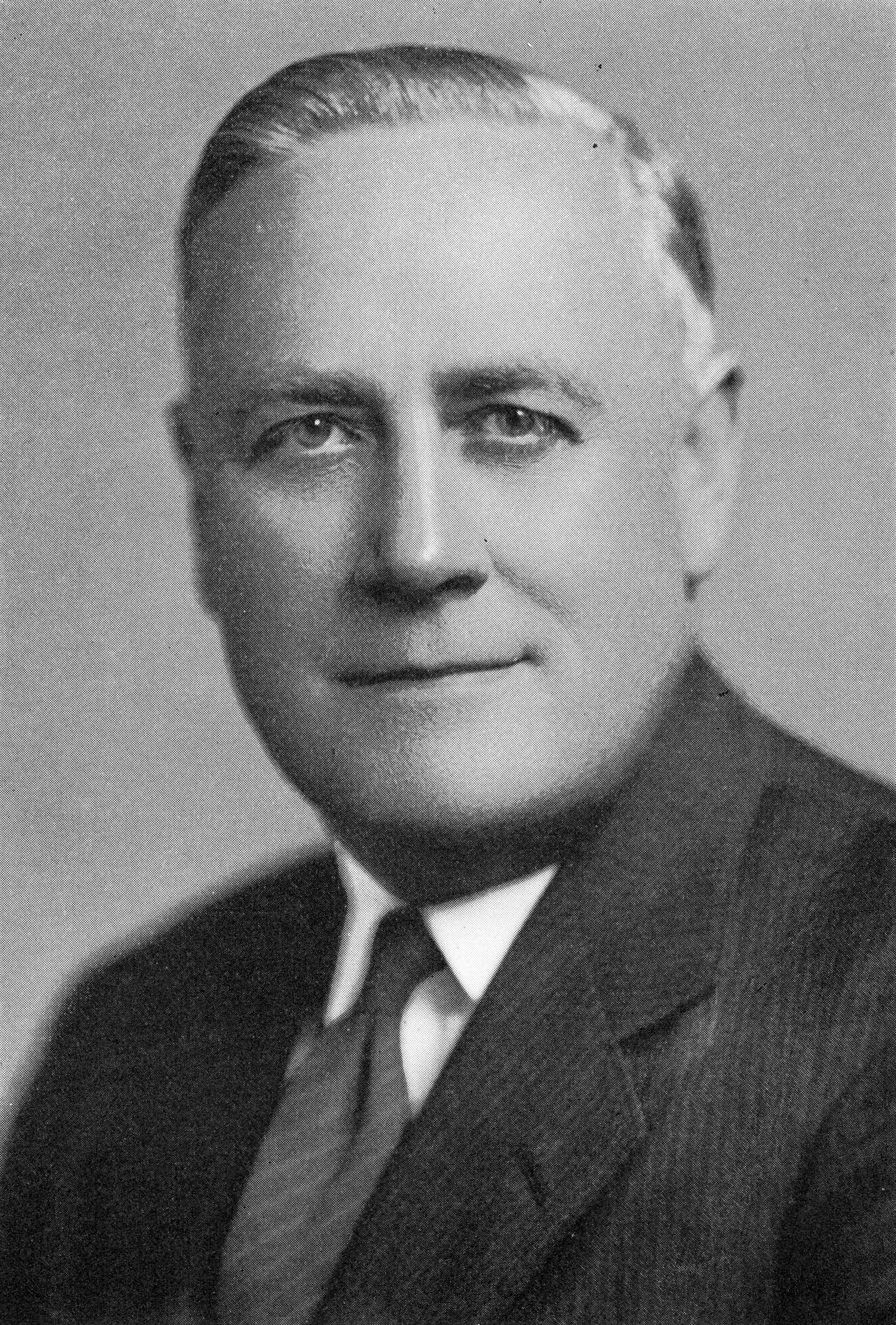

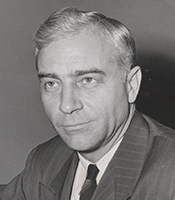

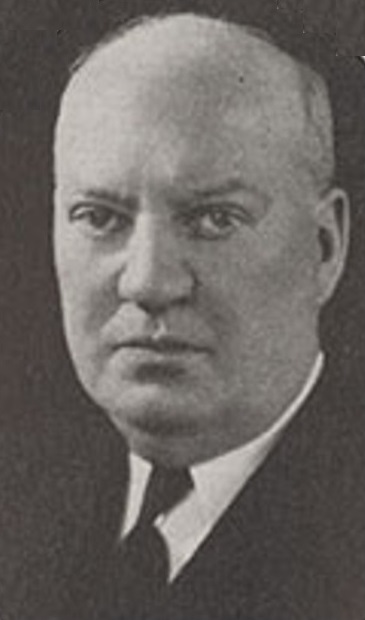
Nominee	Alexander Wiley	Howard J. McMurray	Harry Sauthoff
Party	Republican	Democratic	Progressive
Popular vote	634,513	537,144	73,089
Percentage	50.50%	42.75%	5.82%
- County results Wiley: 40–50% 50–60% 60–70% 70–80% 80–90% McMurray: 40–50% 50–60% 60–70%
U.S. senator before election
Alexander Wiley
Republican
Elected U.S. Senator
Alexander Wiley
Republican

Wisconsin election
Party	Candidate	Votes	%
Republican	Alexander Wiley (Incumbent)	634,513	50.50%
Democratic	Howard J. McMurray	537,144	42.75%
Progressive	Harry Sauthoff	73,089	5.82%
Socialist	Walter H. Uphoff	9,964	0.79%
Socialist Labor	Adolf Wiggert	1,664	0.13%
None	Scattering	106	0.01%
Majority		97,369	7.75%
Turnout		1,256,480	
Republican hold			

== See also ==
- 1944 United States elections
  - 1944 United States presidential election
  - 1944 United States gubernatorial elections
  - 1944 United States House of Representatives elections
- 78th United States Congress
- 79th United States Congress
