= 1940 North Carolina Secretary of State election =

- November 5, 1940
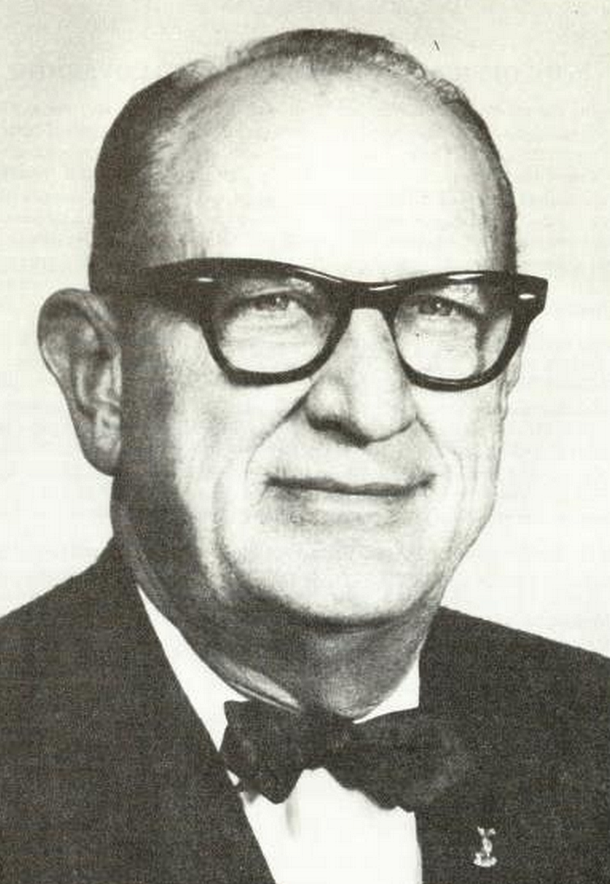

Nominee	Thad A. Eure	A.I. Ferree
Party	Democratic	Republican
Popular vote	601,396	192,938
Percentage	75.71%	24.29%
Secretary of State of North Carolina before election
Thad A. Eure
Democratic
Elected Secretary of State of North Carolina
Thad A. Eure
Democratic

The North Carolina secretary of state election of 1940 took place on November 5, 1940. The incumbent Secretary of State, Thad A. Eure, chose to run for reelection and defeated A. I. Ferree with 75.71% of the vote. Eure won his second of thirteen terms.

== Results ==
North Carolina Secretary of State election, 1940
Party	Candidate	Votes	%
Democratic	Thad A. Eure	601,396	75.71%
Republican	A.I. Ferree	192,938	24.29%
Total votes		794,334	100%
