= 1944 United States Senate election in North Carolina =

- November 7, 1944
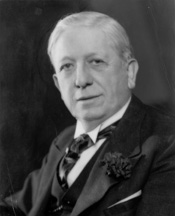

Nominee	Clyde R. Hoey	A.I. Ferree
Party	Democratic	Republican
Popular vote	533,813	226,037
Percentage	70.25%	29.75%
- County results Hoey: 50–60% 60–70% 70–80% 80–90% 90–100% Ferree: 50–60% 60–70% 70–80%
Senator before election
Robert Rice Reynolds
Democratic
Elected Senator
Clyde R. Hoey
Democratic

The 1944 United States Senate election in North Carolina was held on November 7, 1944. Incumbent Democratic Senator Robert Rice Reynolds did not run for a third term in office. Former Governor of North Carolina Clyde R. Hoey won the open seat, defeating U.S. Representative Cameron A. Morrison in the Democratic primary and Republican attorney A.I. Ferree in the general election.

== Democratic primary ==
=== Candidates ===
- Clyde R. Hoey, former Governor of North Carolina (1937–41)
- Cameron A. Morrison, U.S. Representative from Charlotte and former Governor and interim U.S. Senator
- Giles Y. Newton
- Marvin L. Ritch
- Arthur Simmons

=== Results ===
1944 Democratic Senate primary
Party	Candidate	Votes	%
Democratic	Clyde R. Hoey	211,049	68.92%
Democratic	Cameron A. Morrison	80,134	26.17%
Democratic	Marvin L. Ritch	7,428	2.43%
Democratic	Arthur Simmons	4,593	1.50%
Democratic	Giles Y. Newton	3,037	0.99%
Total votes		306,241	100.00%

== General election ==
=== Candidates ===
- Clyde R. Hoey, former Governor of North Carolina (Democratic)
- A.I. Ferree, State Representative from Asheboro (Republican)

=== Results ===
1944 U.S. Senate election in North Carolina
Party	Candidate	Votes	%	±%
Democratic	Clyde R. Hoey	533,813	70.25%	▲6.42
Republican	A.I. Ferree	226,037	29.75%	▼6.42
Total votes		759,850	100.00%	
