= A. I. Ferree =

American politician and attorney

Arris Idyl Ferree (October 9, 1890 – June 19, 1965) was an American politician and attorney. A Republican based in Asheboro, North Carolina, Ferree served two non-consecutive terms in the North Carolina House of Representatives.

He was a graduate of the law school at Wake Forest College. He was elected to the North Carolina House of Representatives at least twice, serving in the 1925 and 1943 legislatures.

Ferree was the Republican nominee for Congress in North Carolina's 7th congressional district in 1928 (losing to William C. Hammer), for Congress in North Carolina's 4th congressional district in 1936 (losing to Harold D. Cooley), for North Carolina Secretary of State in 1940 (losing to Thad Eure), and for the U.S. Senate in 1944 (losing to Clyde R. Hoey).

He and his wife, Mabel, established the Ferree Foundation to provide higher educational scholarships to Randolph County students.

Party political offices
Preceded by Junius B. Goslin	Republican nominee for North Carolina Commissioner of Labor; 1932	Succeeded by David T. Vance
Preceded by James L. Campbell	Republican nominee for North Carolina Secretary of State; 1940	Succeeded by Watt Gragg
Preceded by Charles A. Jonas	Republican nominee for U.S. Senator from North Carolina (Class 3); 1944	Succeeded by Halsey B. Leavitt
