= 1932 North Carolina gubernatorial election =

- November 8, 1932
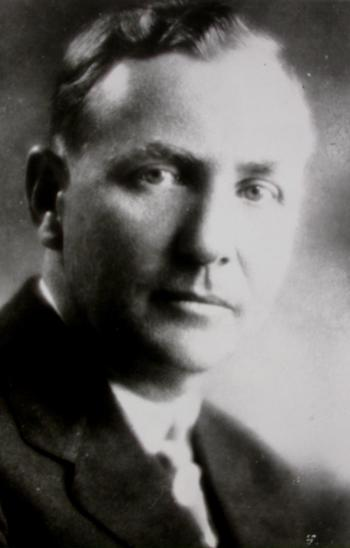

Nominee	John C. B. Ehringhaus	Clifford C. Frazier
Party	Democratic	Republican
Popular vote	497,657	212,561
Percentage	70.07%	29.93%
- County results Enringhaus: 50–60% 60–70% 70–80% 80–90% >90% Frazier: 50–60% 60–70% 70–80%
Governor before election
Oliver Max Gardner
Democratic
Elected Governor
John C. B. Ehringhaus
Democratic

The 1932 North Carolina gubernatorial election was held on November 8, 1932. Democratic nominee John C. B. Ehringhaus defeated Republican nominee Clifford C. Frazier with 70.07% of the vote. At the time, Ehringhaus was an attorney and former state legislator; Frazier was an attorney, based in Greensboro.

== Primary elections ==
Primary elections were held on June 4, 1932.

=== Democratic primary ===
==== Candidates ====
- John C. B. Ehringhaus, former State Representative
- Richard T. Fountain, incumbent Lieutenant Governor
- Allen J. Maxwell, North Carolina Commissioner of Revenue

==== Results ====
Democratic primary results
Party	Candidate	Votes	%
Democratic	John C. B. Ehringhaus	162,498	42.80
Democratic	Richard T. Fountain	115,127	30.32
Democratic	Allen J. Maxwell	102,032	26.88
Total votes		379,657	100.00

Democratic primary runoff results
Party	Candidate	Votes	%
Democratic	John C. B. Ehringhaus	182,055	51.86
Democratic	Richard T. Fountain	168,971	48.14
Total votes		351,026	100.00

== General election ==
=== Candidates ===
- John C. B. Ehringhaus, Democratic
- Clifford C. Frazier, Republican

=== Results ===
The result was a landslide victory for Ehringhaus, coming as the state, and the nation, elected Democrat Franklin D. Roosevelt as president. Ehringhaus won "the largest majority accorded a Democratic nominee [for Governor of North Carolina] up to that time."

1932 North Carolina gubernatorial election
Party	Candidate	Votes	%	±%
Democratic	John C. B. Ehringhaus	497,657	70.07%	
Republican	Clifford C. Frazier	212,561	29.93%	
Majority		285,096		
Turnout				
Democratic hold		Swing		
