= 1936 North Carolina gubernatorial election =

- November 3, 1936
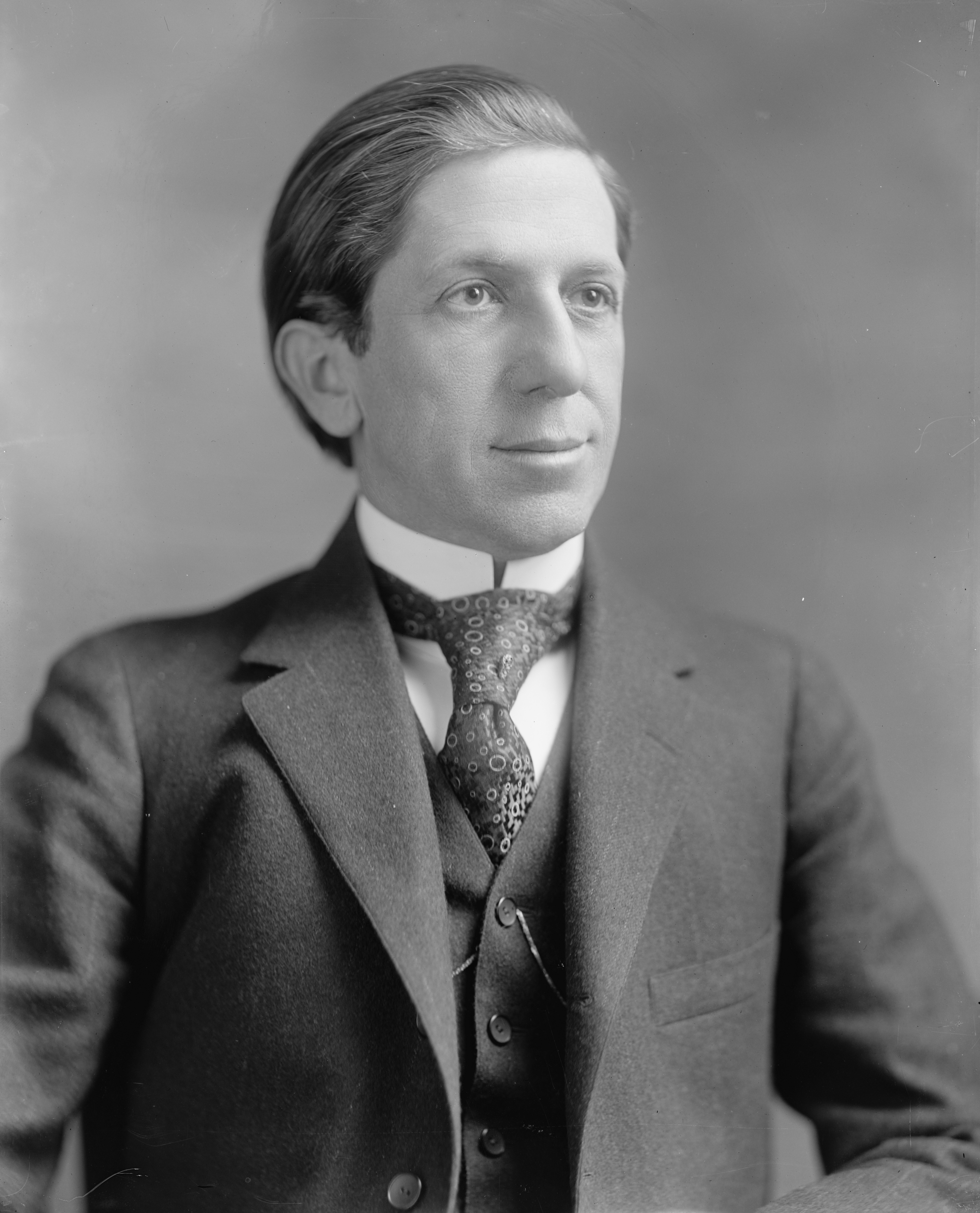

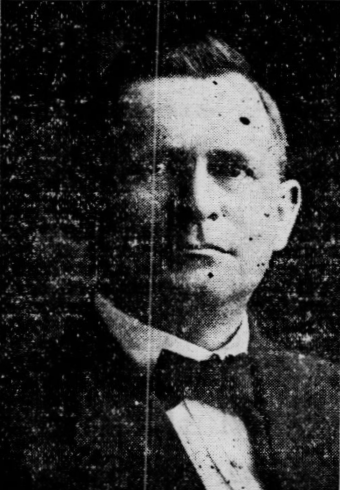
Nominee	Clyde R. Hoey	Gilliam Grissom
Party	Democratic	Republican
Popular vote	542,139	270,843
Percentage	66.69%	33.31%
- County results Hoey: 50–60% 60–70% 70–80% 80–90% >90% Grissom: 50–60% 60–70% 70–80%
Governor before election
John C. B. Ehringhaus
Democratic
Elected Governor
Clyde R. Hoey
Democratic

The 1936 North Carolina gubernatorial election was held on November 3, 1936. Democratic nominee Clyde R. Hoey defeated Republican nominee Gilliam Grissom with 66.69% of the vote.

== Primary elections ==
Primary elections were held on May 24, 1936.

=== Democratic primary ===
==== Candidates ====
- Clyde R. Hoey, former U.S. Representative
- Ralph McDonald, State Representative
- Alexander H. Graham, incumbent Lieutenant Governor
- John A. McRae

==== Results ====
Democratic primary results
Party	Candidate	Votes	%
Democratic	Clyde R. Hoey	193,972	37.53
Democratic	Ralph McDonald	189,504	36.66
Democratic	Alexander H. Graham	126,782	24.53
Democratic	John A. McRae	6,606	1.28
Total votes		516,864	100.00

Democratic primary runoff results
Party	Candidate	Votes	%
Democratic	Clyde R. Hoey	266,354	55.40
Democratic	Ralph McDonald	214,414	44.60
Total votes		480,768	100.00

=== Republican convention ===
==== Candidates ====
- Gilliam Grissom, former North Carolina Collector of Internal Revenue
- Irvin B. Tucker, former United States Attorney for the Eastern District of North Carolina

==== Results ====
Republican convention results
Party	Candidate	Votes	%
Republican	Gilliam Grissom	694	63.96
Republican	Irvin B. Tucker	391	36.04
Total votes		1,085	100.00

== General election ==
=== Candidates ===
- Clyde R. Hoey, Democratic
- Gilliam Grissom, Republican

=== Results ===
1936 North Carolina gubernatorial election
Party	Candidate	Votes	%	±%
Democratic	Clyde R. Hoey	542,139	66.69%	
Republican	Gilliam Grissom	270,843	33.31%	
Majority		271,296	33.37%	
Total votes		812,982	100.00%	
Democratic hold		Swing		
