= James L. Webb =

American politician

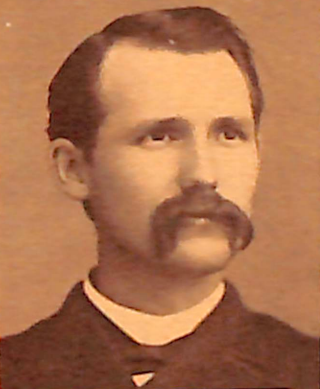
Webb c. 1887

James Landrum Webb (November 12, 1854 – October 1, 1930) was an American politician and jurist.

== Early life ==
Webb was born on November 12, 1854, in Cleveland County, North Carolina, United States. His father was a Baptist minister. He studied at Wake Forest University for three and a half years before returning to Cleveland County to assist Plato Durham in editing The Shelby Banner during the Reconstruction era. Webb then studied law under Chief Justice of the North Carolina Supreme Court Richmond Mumford Pearson before becoming licensed to practice law in 1877. The following year he married K. L. Andrews and opened a law practice with Durham. He later started a law firm with his brother, Edwin Y. Webb.

== Political and judicial career ==
Webb was a member of the Democratic Party. He was elected Mayor of Shelby, North Carolina, in 1880. In 1883 he was elected to the North Carolina Senate, holding that office until President Grover Cleveland appointed him as a postal inspector in 1885. He served in that capacity for six months, and in 1887 he was reelected to the Senate and served as its president pro tempore.

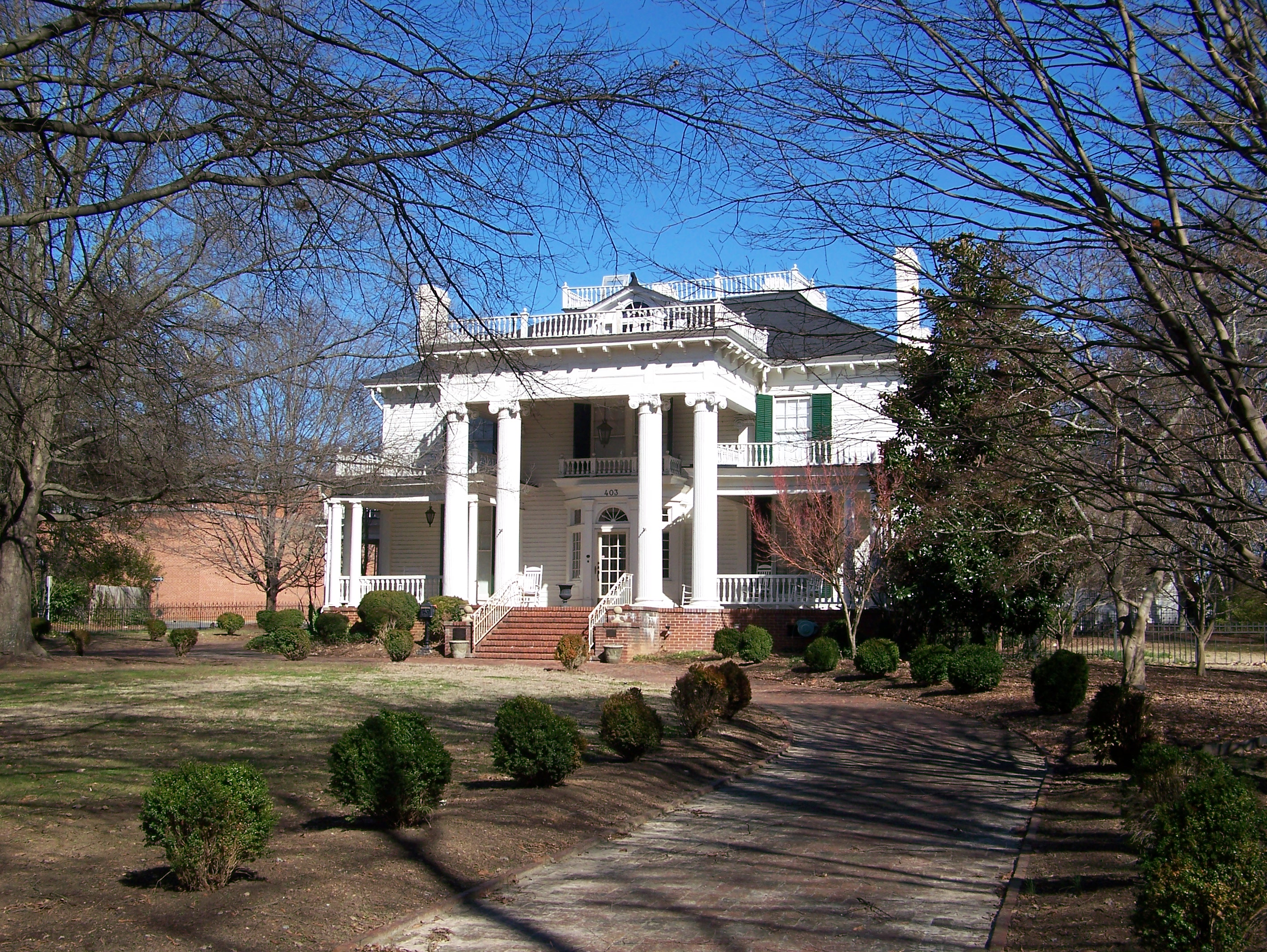
Webbley, Webb's mansion in Shelby, North Carolina

In the 1890s Republican and Populist Fusionists obtained control of Cleveland County government offices. Webb and his brother Edwin worked to create a local Democratic political machine which successfully ousted them. In 1892 North Carolina Governor Thomas Michael Holt appointed Webb as a district solicitor, filling in a vacancy. He was subsequently elected to keep the post. In November 1904 he was appointed as a judge to the North Carolina Superior Court by Governor Charles Brantley Aycock to fill a vacancy. Pursuant to his duties as solicitor and judge, Webb visited every county in North Carolina to try and hear cases. He was continuously reelected to the judicial office, never facing any challenger in the Democratic primary.

Webb's daughter, Fay Webb, married Shelby politician O. Max Gardner. In 1911 Webb bought a large mansion in Shelby, which quickly acquired the name Webbley. He subsequently moved his family into the house, joined by the Gardner family. In 1928 Gardner was elected Governor of North Carolina. Together with his brother Edwin, politician Clyde R. Hoey, and legal partner Odus M. Mull, Webb became a leading figure in Gardner's nascent political organization, dubbed the Shelby Dynasty.

In early 1930 Webb declared that he would retire from his judicial post in December due to health problems. In September he began experiencing heart trouble. He died on October 1, 1930, at his home in Shelby.

== Works cited ==
- Weathers, Lee Beam (1956). The Living Past of Cleveland County: A History. Shelby: Star Publishing Company. OCLC 3592133.
