= J. Elmer Long =

American politician (1880–1955)

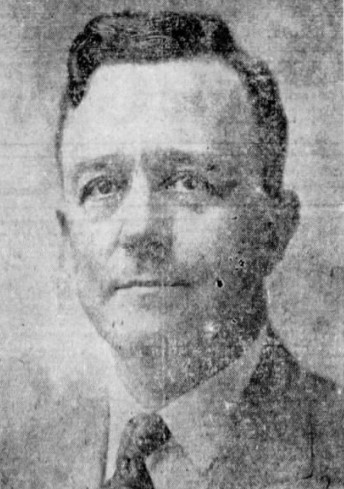
Long c. 1925

Jacob Elmer Long (July 31, 1880 – April 28, 1955) was the 15th Lieutenant Governor of North Carolina from 1925 to 1929 serving under Governor Angus W. McLean.

Long was born in Yanceyville, North Carolina in 1880, the son of lawyer Jacob Alson Long. After attending Horner Military Academy and graduating from the University of North Carolina at Chapel Hill in 1903, he also became a lawyer. He served as private secretary to U.S. Rep. Charles M. Stedman and was elected to at least two terms in the North Carolina House of Representatives from Alamance County as a Democrat.

After serving one term (the maximum then allowed) as Lieutenant Governor, Long resumed the practice of law in Durham, North Carolina and served as president of the North Carolina Bar Association in 1933–1934.

He is a distant relative of North Carolina Commissioner of Insurance Jim Long.

Party political offices
Preceded by William B. Cooper	Democratic nominee for Lieutenant Governor of North Carolina; 1924	Succeeded by Richard T. Fountain
Political offices
Preceded by William B. Cooper	Lieutenant Governor of North Carolina; 1925-1929	Succeeded by Richard T. Fountain
