= Tillie Ehringhaus =

First Lady of North Carolina

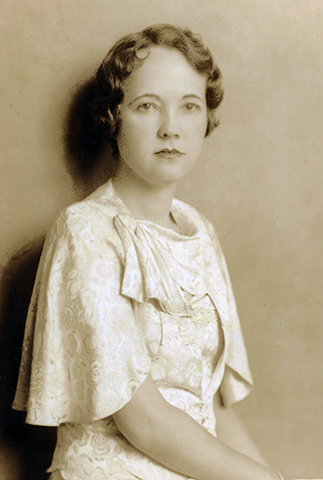

First Lady of North Carolina
- Assumed role January 5, 1933 – January 7, 1937
- Governor: John C. B. Ehringhaus
- Preceded by: Fay Webb-Gardner
- Succeeded by: Bessie Gardner Hoey

Personal details
- Born: Matilda Bradford Haughton; October 23, 1890 Williamston, North Carolina, U.S.
- Died: June 16, 1980 (aged 89) Raleigh, North Carolina, U.S.
- Resting place: Episcopal Cemetery
- Party: Democratic
- Spouse: John C. B. Ehringhaus
- Children: 3
- Parent(s): Thomas Benbury Haughton; Susan Elizabeth Lamb
- Education: St. Mary's Junior College

Matilda Bradford "Tillie" Ehringhaus (née Haughton; October 23, 1890 – June 16, 1980) was an American civic leader who, as the wife of John C. B. Ehringhaus, served as First Lady of North Carolina from 1933 to 1937. Since her time in the North Carolina Executive Mansion was marked by the Great Depression, she made budget cuts and adaptations around the mansion to save money for the state, including having the wattage of the chandeliers lowered so that the electric bill would not exceed monthly expenses. As first lady, she hosted musical salons and was noted for her beauty and charm. After her husband's death, Ehringhaus co-edited the North Carolina Almanac and State Industrial Guide and, in 1952, served as an alternate delegate to the Democratic National Convention.

== Early life and family ==
Ehringhaus was born Matilda Bradford Haughton on October 23, 1890, in Williamston, North Carolina, to Rev. Thomas Benbury Haughton, an Episcopal priest, and Susan Elizabeth Lamb Haughton. She was a member of an aristocratic North Carolinian family, as her father's family were planters in the Albemarle Region. Her granduncle, Thomas Haughton, was a close friend and colleague of Governor James Iredell Jr. and U.S. Congressman Ebenezer Pettigrew. During the American Civil War, Ehringhaus' father served as the chaplain of the 50th North Carolina Infantry Regiment in the Confederate States Army until they surrendered at Bennett Place in Durham while under the leadership of Joseph E. Johnston of the Army of Tennessee. After the war, he served as the parish priest and rector of the Episcopal church of the Advent in Williamston. Her mother, Susan, was the daughter of Wilson Gray Lamb, Jr., a local political leader, merchant, and Confederate veteran. Through her maternal grandfather, Ehringhaus was a descendant of Colonel Gideon Lamb, a military officer who served in the 6th North Carolina Regiment of the Continental Army during the American Revolution. Her granduncle, Lieutenant Colonel John Calhoun Lamb, was mortally wounded during the Bermuda Hundred campaign in the Civil War.

When Ehringhaus was four years old her father died and the family moved to Washington, North Carolina. She attended St. Mary's Junior College, a girls' school in Raleigh, and graduated with a business certificate in 1908. Prior to her marriage, Ehringhaus worked as a secretary.

== Public life ==
In 1932 Ehringhaus' husband was elected as the 58th Governor of North Carolina, and assumed office the following January, at which time she assumed the role of First Lady of North Carolina. Her husband's administration was during the Great Depression and, due to this, the inauguration ceremony and festivities were very simple. The North Carolina General Assembly approved a budget of only six hundred dollars for the event. She had been apprehensive about her husband running for governor and, according to a report in the News & Record, she was "alarmed" by her husband's decision. Ehringhaus was noted for her beauty and charm, and a 1933 article published by Our State stated, "If they ever have a beauty contest among governor's wives, our Tilly will take the loving cup, or the medal, or whatever it is that they give as first prizes in contests of this nature."

While living in the North Carolina Executive Mansion in Raleigh, Ehringhaus hosted musical salons, where her husband played the piano while guests sang. In order to accommodate budget cuts during the Depression, she had the wattage of the chandeliers in the mansion lowered, so that the electric bill. She brought her own family's silver service into the house in order to serve guests during official dinners. Her husband's administration lasted one term. In 1957, she told a reporter for the News & Observer that being First Lady of North Carolina was "an experience I'm glad I had, but I wouldn't want to be a governor's wife two terms."

In 1952 she was an alternate delegate to the Democratic National Convention. Ehringhaus co-edited the North Carolina Almanac and State Industrial Guide.

== Personal life ==
On January 4, 1912, she married John Christoph Blucher Ehringhaus, an attorney, at St. Peter's Episcopal Church in Washington. After the wedding, the couple moved to Elizabeth City, where her husband practiced law. They had three children: John Christoph Blucher Ehringhaus, Jr., Matilda Ehringhaus, and Haughton Ehringhaus. While her husband served in the North Carolina General Assembly the family lived at the Sir Walter Hotel in downtown Raleigh.

In 1923 she visited Land's End Plantation in Perquimans County.

After her husband finished his term as governor in January 1937, the family moved to a house on Fairview Road in the affluent Five Points neighborhood in Raleigh. In 1946 they moved back to the Sir Walter Hotel, where her husband died three years later. In 1954, she moved to a small farm outside of Edenton, where some of her relatives lived. She remodeled her house there, and two of her grandchildren lived with her while attended school in Edenton. She remained on the farm for twenty years before returning to Raleigh.

== Death and legacy ==
She died on June 16, 1980, at a nursing home in Raleigh. She was buried next to her husband in his family's plot in Episcopal Cemetery in Elizabeth City.

In December 2012, Ehringhaus' inaugural gown was included in an exhibit on Governors and First Ladies of North Carolina at the North Carolina Museum of History.

Honorary titles
Preceded by Fay Webb-Gardner	First Lady of North Carolina; 1933–1937	Succeeded by Bessie Gardner Hoey
