= Alson =

Alson is a given name. Notable people with the name include:

- Alson (horse) (foaled 13 February 2017) is a German-bred thoroughbred racehorse
- Alson S. Clark (1876–1949), American Impressionist painter best remembered for his landscapes
- Jacob Alson Long (1846–1923), prominent lawyer in Graham, North Carolina
- Alson Sherman (1811–1903), served as mayor of Chicago (1844–1845), for the Independent Democrat Party
- Alson Streeter (1823–1901), of New Windsor, Illinois, the Union Labor Party nominee in the United States presidential election of 1888
- Alson Weber (1910–2005), Canadian volleyball player
- Alson Wood (1828–1904), American politician
