= Allenson =

Allenson is a surname. Notable people with the surname include:

- Gary Allenson (born 1955), American baseball manager, player, and coach
- John Allenson (born c. 1558), English theologian

== See also ==
- Allen (disambiguation)
- Allens (disambiguation)
- Allinson
- Alson
