= Daughtridge =

Daughtridge is a surname. Notable people with the surname include:

- Elijah L. Daughtridge (1863–1921), American politician
- William G. Daughtridge Jr. (1952–2019), American businessman and politician
