= 1936 North Carolina lieutenant gubernatorial election =

- November 3, 1936
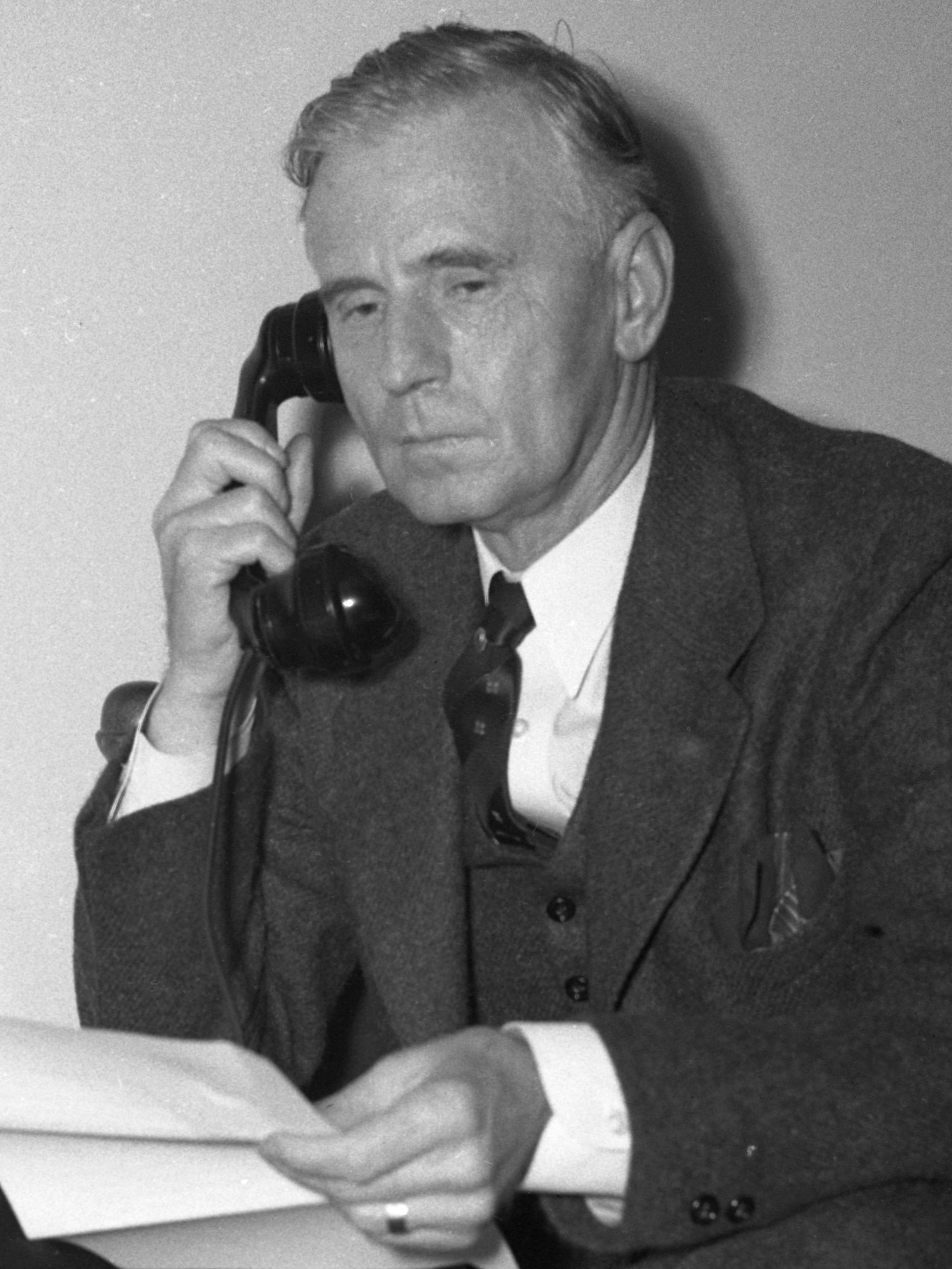

Nominee	Wilkins P. Horton	J. Samuel White
Party	Democratic	Republican
Popular vote	555,390	236,438
Percentage	70.14%	29.86%
Lieutenant Governor before election
Alexander H. Graham
Democratic
Elected Lieutenant Governor
Wilkins P. Horton
Democratic

The 1936 North Carolina lieutenant gubernatorial election was held on November 3, 1936. Democratic nominee Wilkins P. Horton defeated Republican nominee J. Samuel White with 70.14% of the vote.

== Primary elections ==
Primary elections were held on June 6, 1936.

=== Democratic primary ===
==== Candidates ====
- Wilkins P. Horton, State Senator
- Paul D. Grady, State Senator
- George McNeill, businessman

==== Results ====
Democratic primary results
Party	Candidate	Votes	%
Democratic	Paul D. Grady	162,221	37.77
Democratic	Wilkins P. Horton	138,631	32.28
Democratic	George McNeill	128,661	29.96
Total votes		429,513	100.00

Democratic primary runoff results
Party	Candidate	Votes	%
Democratic	Wilkins P. Horton	217,230	51.06
Democratic	Paul D. Grady	208,248	48.94
Total votes		425,478	100.00

== General election ==
=== Candidates ===
- Wilkins P. Horton, Democratic
- J. Samuel White, Republican

=== Results ===
1936 North Carolina lieutenant gubernatorial election
Party	Candidate	Votes	%	±%
Democratic	Wilkins P. Horton	555,390	70.14%	
Republican	J. Samuel White	236,438	29.86%	
Majority		318,952		
Turnout				
Democratic hold		Swing		
