= Wilkins P. Horton =

American politician

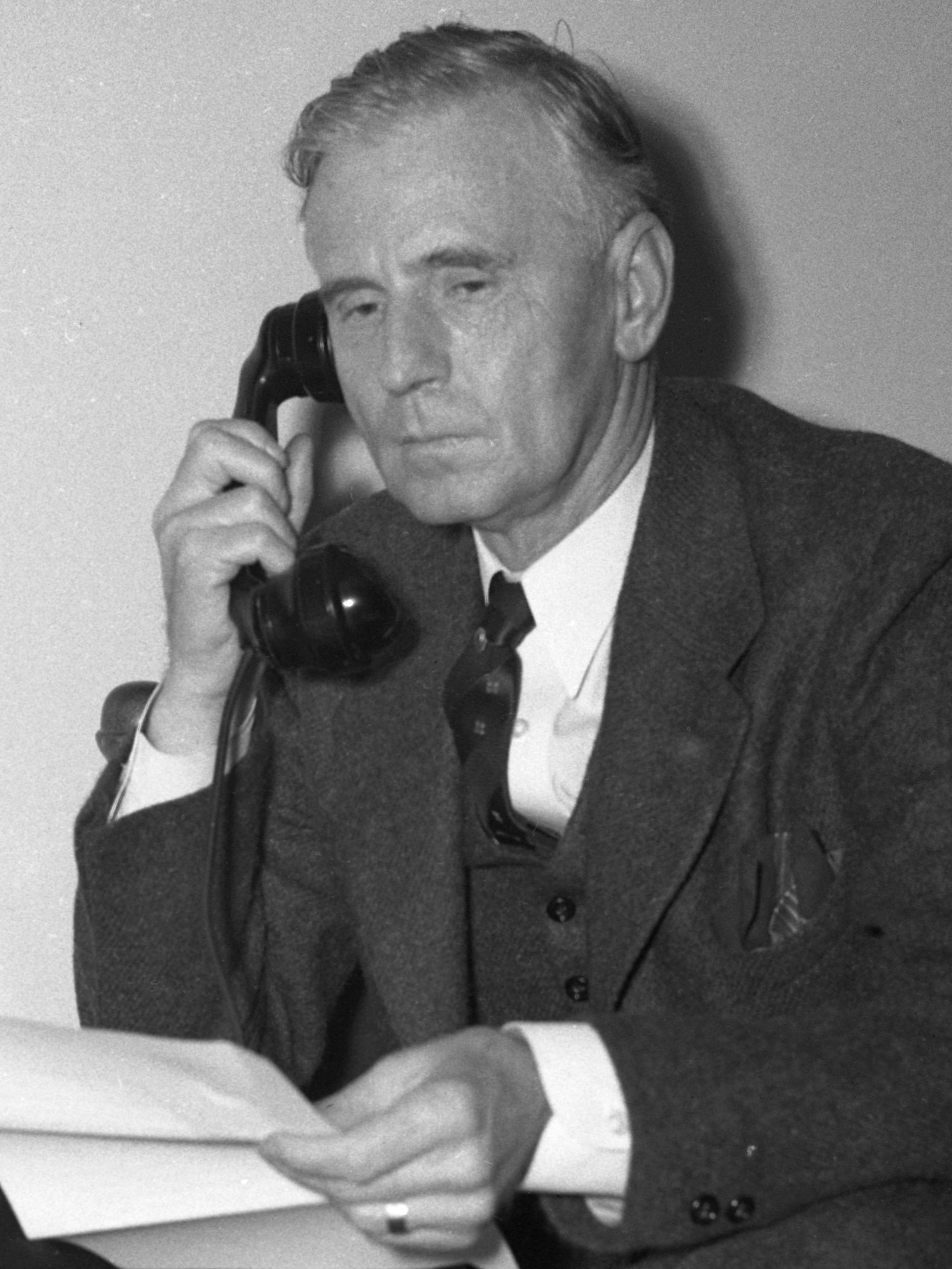
Horton in 1939

Wilkins Perryman Horton (September 1, 1889 – February 1, 1950) was the 18th Lieutenant Governor of North Carolina from 1937 to 1941 serving under Governor Clyde R. Hoey.

Horton was born in Kansas City, Kansas on September 1, 1889. He practiced law and was elected to the North Carolina Senate from the Chatham County area, serving in 1919, 1927, 1931, and 1935. In 1940, barred by the state constitution of the time from running for a second term as lieutenant governor, Horton ran for governor, but lost the Democratic primary election to J. Melville Broughton.

Party political offices
Preceded by Alexander H. Graham	Democratic nominee for Lieutenant Governor of North Carolina; 1936	Succeeded by Reginald L. Harris
Political offices
Preceded by Alexander H. Graham	Lieutenant Governor of North Carolina; 1937-1941	Succeeded by Reginald L. Harris
