= Margaret Gardner Hoey =

First Lady of North Carolina (1875–1942)

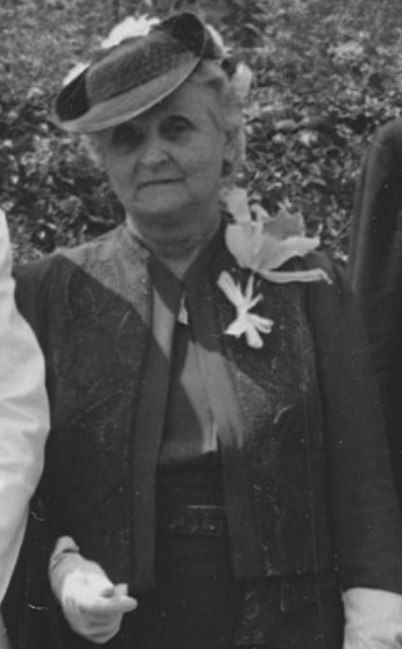
- Hoey in 1940

First Lady of North Carolina
- In role January 7, 1937 – January 9, 1941
- Governor: Clyde R. Hoey
- Preceded by: Matilda Haughton Ehringhaus
- Succeeded by: Alice Willson Broughton

Personal details
- Born: Margaret Elizabeth Gardner; January 21, 1875 Shelby, North Carolina, U.S.
- Died: February 13, 1942 (aged 67) Shelby, North Carolina, U.S.
- Resting place: Sunset Cemetery
- Party: Democratic
- Spouse: Clyde R. Hoey
- Children: 3
- Parent(s): Oliver Perry Gardner; Margaret Young
- Relatives: Oliver Max Gardner (brother) Fay Webb-Gardner (sister-in-law)
- Education: Shelby Female College

Margaret Elizabeth "Bessie" Hoey (née Gardner; January 21, 1875 – February 13, 1942) was an American civic leader and political hostess who served as the First Lady of North Carolina from 1937 to 1941. She was part of the "Shelby Dynasty" and is the only North Carolinian first lady to be the wife of one governor, Clyde R. Hoey, and the sister of another governor, Oliver Max Gardner. While serving as first lady, Hoey focused on issues related to women's roles and children's welfare, advocated for highway beautification across the state, and established a green house for exotic plants at the state penitentiary.

She was known to be an eloquent and passionate orator, giving speeches across the state. Prior to serving as first lady, she acted as a political hostess while her husband served in the North Carolina General Assembly and the U.S. House of Representatives.

She was involved in various religious, civic, and lineage organizations including the Daughters of the American Revolution and the United Daughters of the Confederacy, and was a supporter of local amateur dramatic arts.

== Early life and family ==
Hoey was born Margaret Elizabeth Gardner in Shelby, North Carolina, on January 21, 1875, to Oliver Perry Gardner and his second wife, Margaret Young Gardner. Her father was a respected physician, prominent civic leader, and farmer who served in Company I of the 38th North Carolina Regiment of the Confederate States Army during the American Civil War. Her maternal great-great-grandfather, George Blanton, was the common ancestor of many of the old families in Shelby including the Gardners, Youngs, and Webbs.

After her mother's death when she was sixteen years old, Hoey helped her father raise her younger brothers and send them to school. She was the sister of Governor Oliver Max Gardner. Her brother's wife, Fay Webb-Gardner, was their distant cousin through the Blanton line.

She was educated at Shelby Female College. Upon finishing her schooling, Hoey worked as a teacher.

== Marriage and public life ==
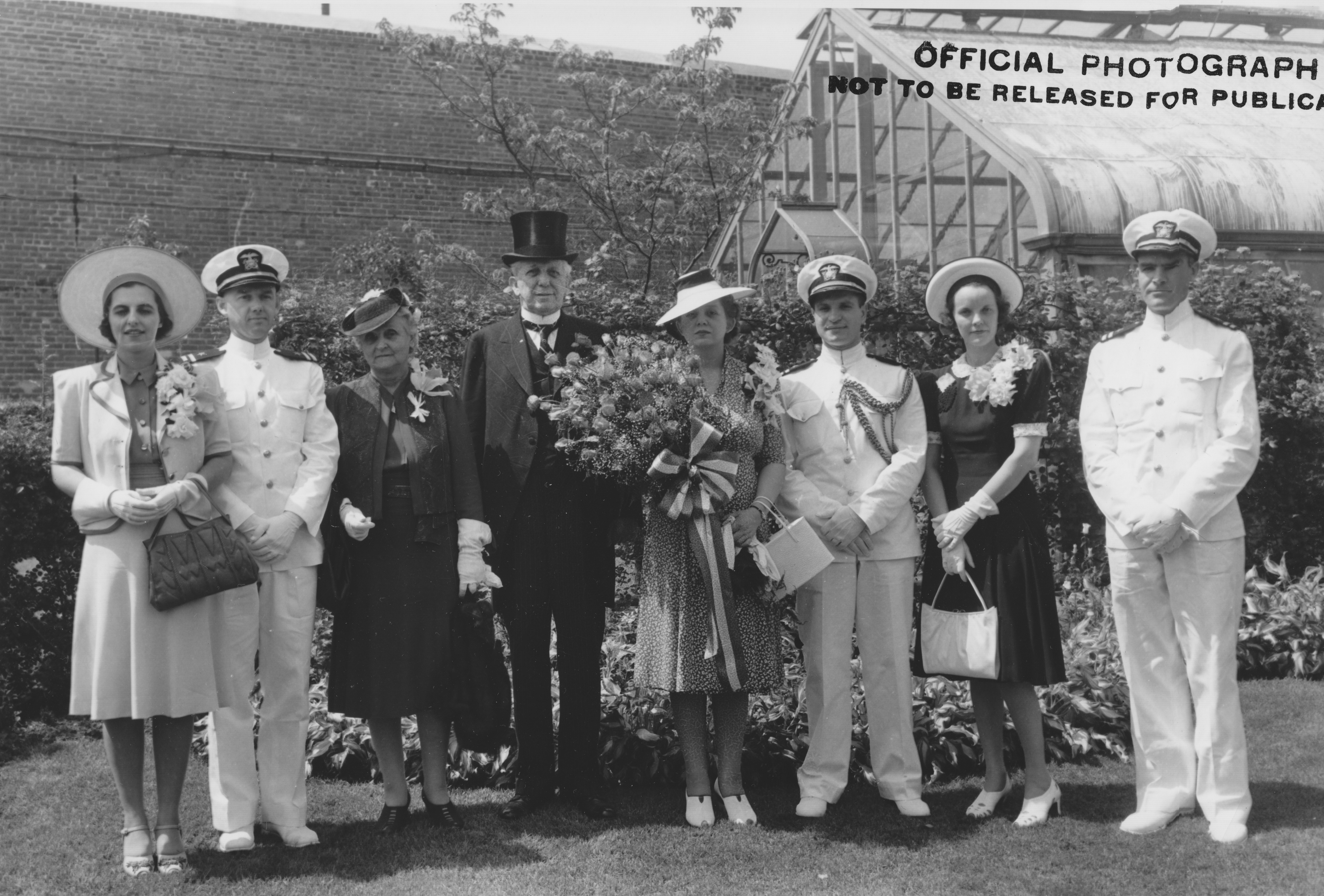
First Lady Hoey (3rd from the left) with Mrs. Padgett, Lieutenant Sampson, Governor Hoey, Isabel Hoey, Lieutenant de Metropolis, Mrs. Robinson, and Lieutenant Myers at the launch ceremony for the USS North Carolina (BB-55) in 1940 at the New York Navy Yard.

She married lawyer, segregationist, and politician Clyde Roark Hoey, who was serving in the North Carolina House of Representatives, on March 22, 1900, and had three children: Clyde R. Hoey Jr., Charles Aycock Hoey, and Isabel Young Hoey. In 1902 her husband was elected to the North Carolina State Senate. In 1919 her husband became a United States Congressman.

Hoey and her husband built a Colonial Revival mansion as their primary residence in Shelby in 1920.

Her husband was elected as the Governor of North Carolina in 1936, and took office on January 7, 1937. She and her family moved to the North Carolina Executive Mansion in Raleigh. She was an active and political first lady, and had a reputation as a passionate and eloquent orator. She spoke publicly about highway beautification, women's roles in society, and child welfare and volunteered for a variety of civic organizations. In 1937, the Raleigh Times remarked, "North Carolina's new first lady, Mrs. Clyde Roark Hoey, graciously gay, witty and sympathetic, brings with her to the Executive Mansion a multiplicity of interests and experiences. Her popularity in the western part of the state-her home-is due to her exceptional love for people, her hospitality and her outstanding personality." Hoey hosted many teas, receptions, and dinners at the executive mansion while serving as first lady and she often shared her duties with her daughter, Isabel, who lived with them. She was seen as a warm and welcoming hostess, often preparing meals for the guests herself. The Charlotte Observer said in 1942 that Hoey ran "a plain, old-fashioned, homey household in which the humblest were heartily welcomed and quickly came to feel at ease in its congenial and affable fellowships. It was Mrs. Hoey who carried to, and made to preside in the Mansion, the spirit of the common people, the social democracy of the common wealth." A talented gardener, she oversaw the executive mansion's grounds and created a greenhouse for exotic flowers at the state penitentiary.

In 1940 she and her husband attended a launching ceremony for the USS North Carolina (BB-55) at the New York Navy Yard in Brooklyn where her daughter was serving as the ship's sponsor.

Hoey was active in civic, social, artistic, and religious organizations including the Daughters of the American Revolution, the United Daughters of the Confederacy, and the Twentieth Century Book Players. She also served as president of the Woman's Club in Shelby. Hoey taught Sunday school classes at her Methodist church, often having more than sixty people in attendance.

== Death and legacy ==
She died of a heart attack on February 13, 1942, in Shelby and was buried in Sunset Cemetery. Her husband, who outlived her, wore a red rose or carnation in his lapel daily to honor her. Upon his death, the Bess Gardner Hoey Memorial Fund was established as a trust for charitable, educational, and religious purposes.

Honorary titles
Preceded by Tillie Ehringhaus	First Lady of North Carolina; 1937–1941	Succeeded by Alice Willson Broughton
