= William C. Newland =

American politician

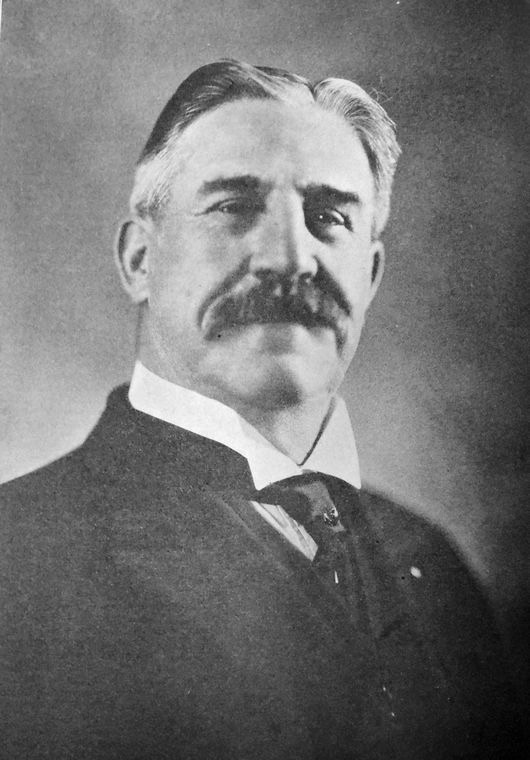
- Newland in 1909

11th Lieutenant Governor of North Carolina
- In office January 12, 1909 – January 15, 1913
- Governor: W. W. Kitchin
- Preceded by: Francis D. Winston
- Succeeded by: Elijah L. Daughtridge

Member of the North Carolina House of Representatives
- In office 1903–1904

Member of the North Carolina House of Representatives
- In office 1889–1890

Member of the North Carolina Senate
- In office 1881–1882

Mayor of Lenoir, North Carolina
- In office 1887–1888
- In office 1901–1903

Personal details
- Born: William Calhoun Newland; October 8, 1857
- Died: November 18, 1938 (aged 81)
- Party: Democratic
- Nickname: Will

William Calhoun Newland (October 8, 1857 – November 18, 1938) was an American attorney who served a term as the 11th Lieutenant Governor of North Carolina (1909–1913).

A Democrat, Newland had previously served as mayor of his hometown, Lenoir, North Carolina twice from 1887 to 1888 and from 1901 to 1903, and was elected to terms in the North Carolina Senate (1881–1882) and in the North Carolina House of Representatives (1889–1890, 1903–1904). While in the General Assembly, Newland introduced and sponsored the bill that established Appalachian State University. In 1904, Newland lost a close race for Congress to E. Spencer Blackburn.

The town of Newland, North Carolina was named after him as part of a political deal to secure his aid in passage of the bill that established Avery County in 1911. Newland is the seat of Avery County.

Party political offices
Preceded by Francis D. Winston	Democratic nominee for Lieutenant Governor of North Carolina; 1908	Succeeded by Elijah L. Daughtridge
Political offices
Preceded by Francis D. Winston	Lieutenant Governor of North Carolina; 1909–1913	Succeeded by Elijah L. Daughtridge
