= Fay Webb-Gardner =

First Lady of North Carolina

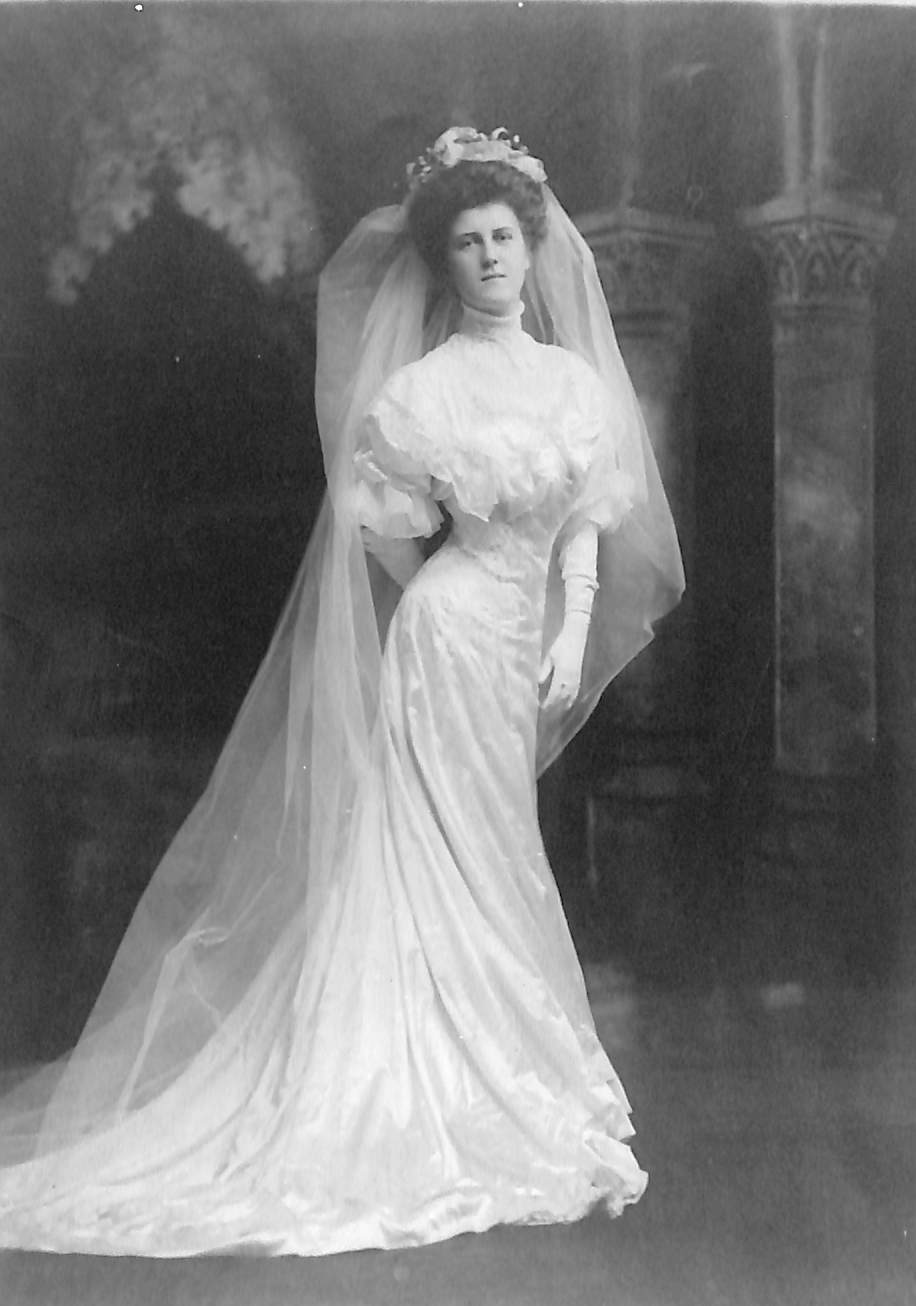
- Webb-Gardner in wedding attire in 1907

First Lady of North Carolina
- Assumed role January 11, 1929 – January 5, 1933
- Governor: Oliver Max Gardner
- Preceded by: Margaret French McLean
- Succeeded by: Matilda Haughton Ehringhaus

Second Lady of North Carolina
- Assumed role January 11, 1917 – January 12, 1921
- Governor: Thomas Walter Bickett
- Lieutenant Governor: Oliver Max Gardner
- Preceded by: Mary Odom Daughtridge

Personal details
- Born: Fay Lamar Webb; September 7, 1885 Shelby, North Carolina, U.S.
- Died: January 16, 1969 (aged 83) Charlotte, North Carolina, U.S.
- Resting place: Sunset Cemetery, Shelby, North Carolina
- Party: Democratic
- Spouse: Oliver Max Gardner
- Children: 4
- Parent(s): James L. Webb; Kansas Love Andrews
- Relatives: Edwin Y. Webb (uncle); Margaret Gardner Hoey (sister-in-law)
- Education: Lucy Cobb Institute

Fay Lamar Webb-Gardner (September 7, 1885 – January 16, 1969) was an American political hostess, businesswoman, and philanthropist. As the wife of Oliver Max Gardner, she served as the Second Lady of North Carolina from 1917 to 1923 and as First Lady of North Carolina from 1929 to 1933. When her husband's political career took them to Washington, D.C., she became known as a prominent society and political hostess and was considered one of the most popular figures in American political circles of the time. Webb-Gardner was active in cultural and civic endeavors and was a member of the American Red Cross, the Woman's Missionary Union, the North Carolina Symphony Society, the National Civic League, and the League of Women Voters, as well as Chairwoman of the North Carolina State Advisory Board of Paroles. A Democrat, she served on the North Carolina Democratic Committee and the Democratic National Committee, and was twice elected as a delegate to the Democratic National Convention.

Gardner–Webb University in Boiling Springs, North Carolina, was named after her and her husband after they made significant financial contributions to the school. Webb later served on the university's board of trustees and as the president of the Gardner Foundation, which helped support the university. An amateur genealogist and member of a prominent North Carolinian family, Webb-Gardner was active in the Colonial Dames of America, the Daughters of the American Revolution, and the United Daughters of the Confederacy.

== Early life, education, and family ==
Fay Lamar Webb was born on September 7, 1885, in Shelby, North Carolina, to politician James L. Webb and Kansas Love Andrews Webb. Her father, a Democrat, served in the North Carolina State Senate and as a judge on the North Carolina Superior Court. She was the niece of U.S. Congressman Edwin Y. Webb. As the granddaughter of a Southern Baptist minister, she was raised in the Baptist faith. A member of a politically and socially prominent North Carolinian family, she was descended from American colonists and had ancestors who fought in the American Revolution, the Mexican-American War, and the American Civil War. Her great-grandfather, Burwell Blanton, was a prominent banker who owned the Banker's House in Shelby.

She attended Shelby public schools and later the Lucy Cobb Institute, a girls' boarding school in Athens, Georgia, graduating from the latter with honors in 1905. Afterward, Webb spent two years traveling in Europe before marrying lawyer Oliver Max Gardner, her distant cousin, on November 6, 1907.

== Public life ==
Webb-Gardner was a prominent political and society hostess throughout her husband's political and legal career in North Carolina, where he worked as a lawyer and served as a state legislator, lieutenant governor, and governor; and in Washington, D.C., where he served as Chairman of the Advisory Board of the Office of War Mobilization and Reconversion and as United States Assistant Secretary of the Treasury. Known as "Miss Fay", she was one of the most popular figures in American political circles of that time. She was noted for "her hospitality, her graciousness, and attractiveness of dress and demeanor." She helped arrange important political and social events including President Harry S. Truman's birthday dinner in 1954 and President John F. Kennedy's inaugural ball in 1961. She had previously served as chairwoman of the Women's Committee for the Jefferson-Jackson Day Dinner in Washington.

Webb-Gardner participated in campaigning activities for her husband and for other members of the Democratic Party. She served on the state and national democratic committees from 1929 to 1922, and was twice elected to serve as a delegate to the Democratic National Convention in 1948 and 1952. She was active in philanthropic efforts, promoting civic and cultural improvements throughout North Carolina. Webb-Gardner was a member of the American Red Cross, the National Civic League, the Garden Club, the Woman's Club of Shelby, the Women's Missionary Union, the League of Women Voters, the Saint Cecilia Music Club, the Twentieth Century Literary Club, and the North Carolina Symphony Society. She served on the North Carolina State Advisory Board of Paroles.

Webb-Gardner owned and managed various business properties in Shelby. She was an executive of the Cleveland Cloth Mills of Shelby and served as director of the Gardner Land Company.

=== Genesis of Gardner-Webb University ===
Her involvement with Gardner-Webb University began when she and her husband provided financial assistance to the Boiling Springs Junior College, a small Christian educational institution which was facing financing challenges in the 1930s and early 1940s. She served as both a trustee of the school and as the president of the Gardner Foundation, an organization charged with preserving the school. In an act of gratitude to Webb-Gardner and her husband for their service to the school, the school's board of trustees renamed the institution as Gardner-Web University in 1942.

== Personal life ==
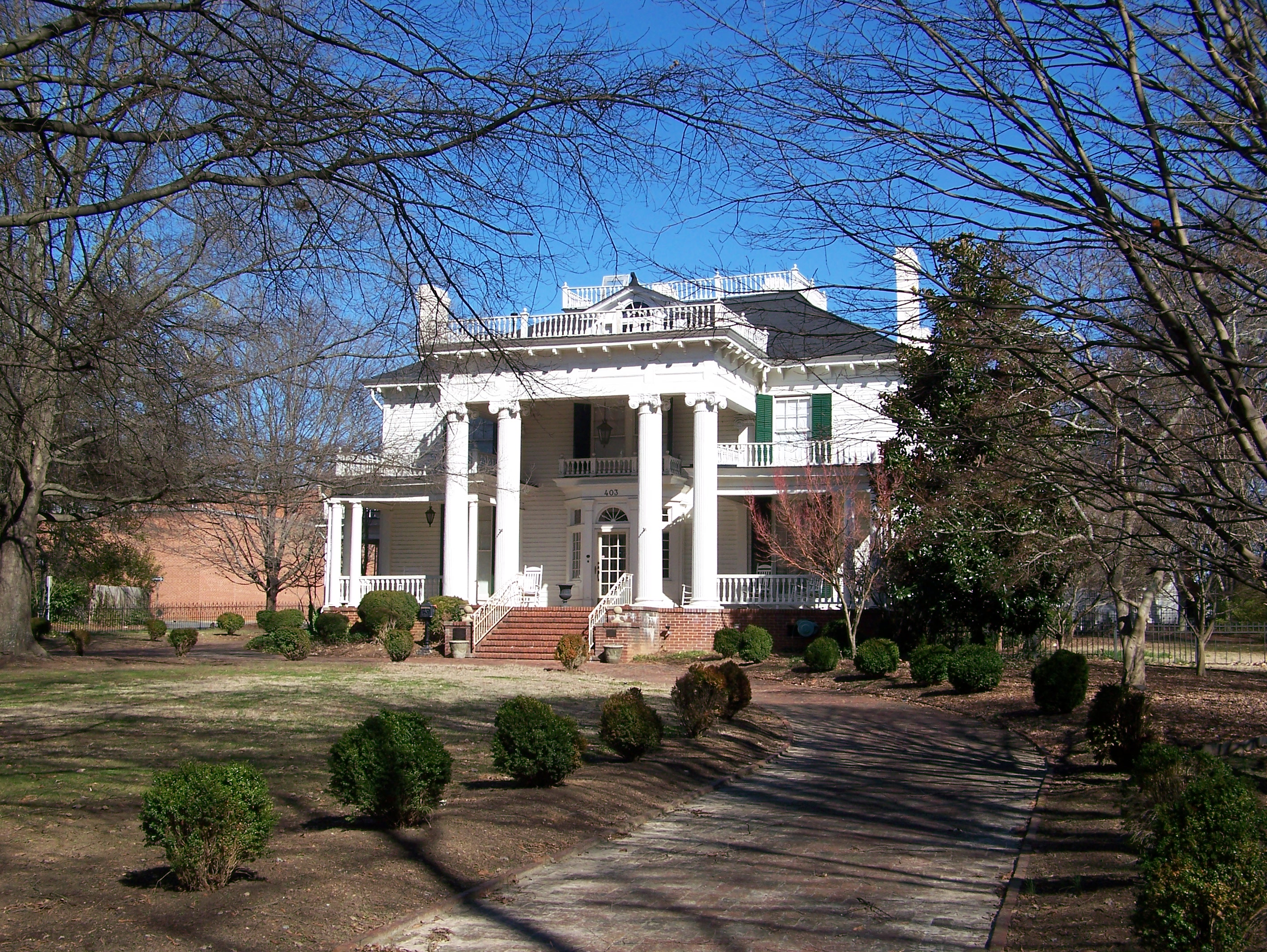
Webbley, the Webb family home in Shelby.

Webb-Gardner was an amateur genealogist and collected research and primary documents dating back to the early 1800s pertaining to the Webb, Andrews, Love, and Gardner families of Cleveland and Rutherford counties in North Carolina. A large portion of the collection documents her extensive involvement in her husband’s political career and in her own valued organizations. She was an active member of the Colonial Dames of America, the Daughters of the American Revolution, and the United Daughters of the Confederacy.

The Gardners had four children: Margaret Love, James, Ralph, and Oliver Max, Jr. They lived at Webbley, the family's estate in Shelby. The couple took up residence in the Mayflower Hotel Washington, D.C. during her husband's career there. After her husband's death, shortly after he had been appointed as the Ambassador of the United States to the Court of St James, she retired to Webbley to live with her sister, Madge Webb Riley. She and her sister had inherited the house from their father.

== Death and legacy ==
On January 10, 1969, Webb-Gardner suffered a stroke. She died in a hospital in Charlotte on January 16, 1969, and was subsequently buried at Sunset Cemetery in Shelby.

In 2017, Gardner-Webb University received a gift from the Gardner Foundation to support undergraduate research by establishing the Fay Webb Gardner Master Mentorship Program. Dr. June Hobbs, director of undergraduate research at Gardner-Webb was named the Fay Webb-Gardner Chair of Student Success in 2018.

Honorary titles
Preceded by Margaret French McLean	First Lady of North Carolina; 1929–1933	Succeeded by Matilda Haughton Ehringhaus
