= Lee B. Weathers =

American newspaper editor and politician

Lee Beam Weathers (1886 – January 11, 1958) was an American newspaper editor and politician. He owned and edited The Shelby Daily Star from 1911 until his death in 1958.

== Early life ==
Lee Beam Weathers was born in 1886 and grew up in Lawndale, Cleveland County, North Carolina. He graduated from Wake Forest College in 1908. He married Breta Noell Clary and had a son and a daughter with her.

== Career ==
Following graduation from college, Weathers worked for two years as a reporter for newspapers in Charlotte, North Carolina. On January 1, 1911, he bought The Cleveland Star from Clyde R. Hoey. He served as president of the North Carolina Press Association from 1928 to 1929. He changed his paper's name to The Shelby Daily Star in 1936. He also wrote a book, The Living Past of Cleveland County: A History.

Some historians consider Weathers to have been a leading figure of the Shelby Dynasty, a political machine which dominated North Carolina politics for two decades. During his tenure the Star acted as an organ of the machine. Hoey, one of the Shelby Dynasty's leaders, was elected Governor of North Carolina in 1936. During Hoey's time in office Weathers served as Secretary of the North Carolina Railroad Commission. Gardner was succeeded by J. Melville Broughton, and under Broughton he was made a member of the State Board of Education and the Board of Conservation and Development. Weathers served four terms in the North Carolina Senate from 1942 to 1950, representing the 27th district encompassing Cleveland, McDowell, and Rutherford counties. He supported legislative measures which increased appropriations for public schools and hospital construction, banned the use of firecrackers, and established a 30-day grace period for payments on purchasing drivers' licenses.

Weathers suffered a heart attack in 1956. He continued to work in his newspaper office but partly retired. On January 11, 1958, he suffered another heart attack and died at the age of 71 while vacationing with his wife in Fort Lauderdale, Florida. He was buried in Sunset Cemetery in Shelby.

== Works cited ==
- Hobbs, June Hadden; DePriest, Joe; Bryant, Hal (2021). Tales and Tombstones of Sunset Cemetery: Tracing Lives and Memorial Customs in a Southern Graveyard. McFarland. ISBN 9781476644288.
- Our Heritage: A History of Cleveland County. Shelby: The Shelby Daily Star. 1976. OCLC 9521708.
