= Webbley =

Historic house in North Carolina, United States

- U.S. National Register of Historic Places
- U.S. Historic district – Contributing property
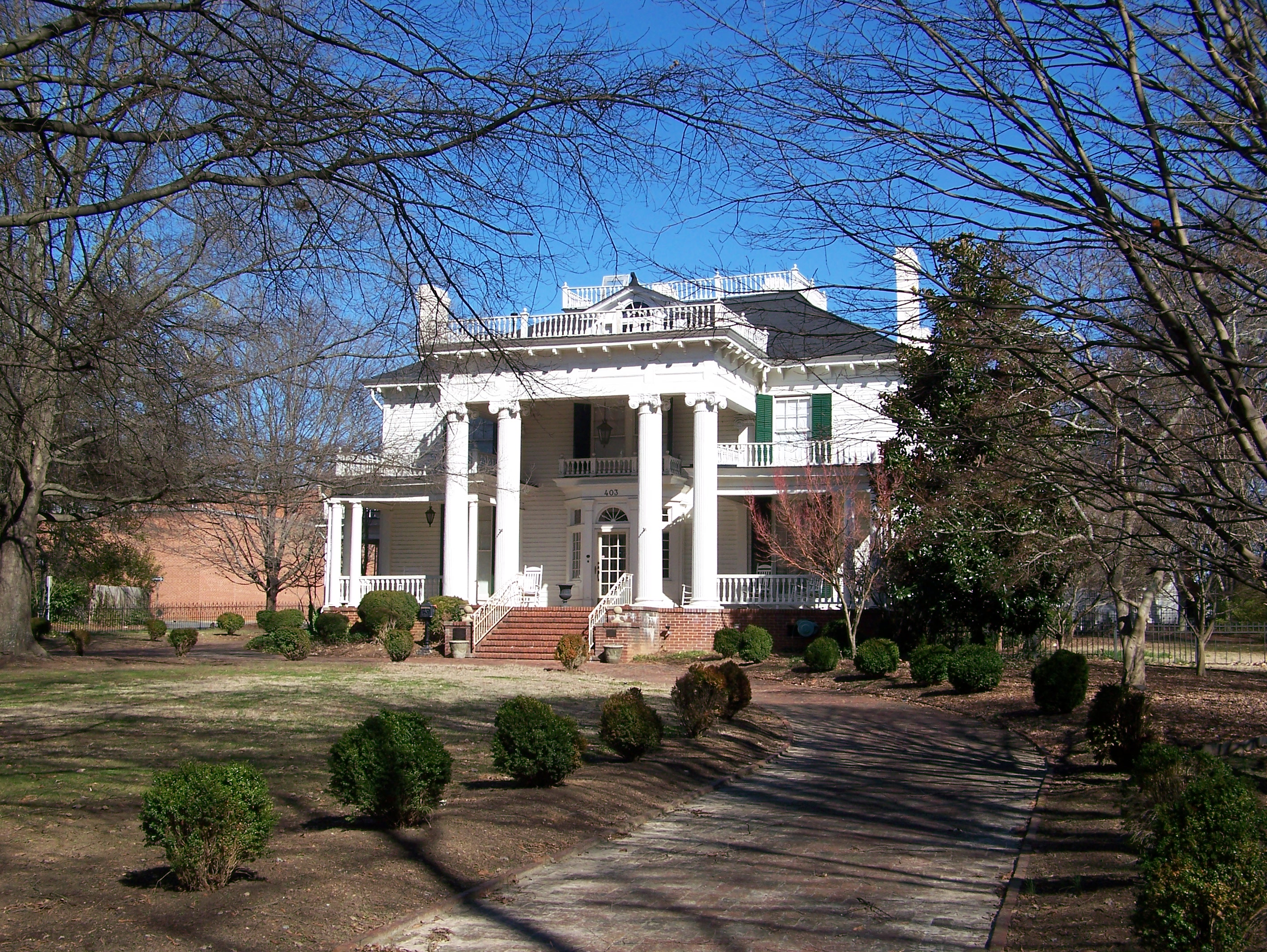

- Location within North Carolina Location within the United States
- Location: 403 S. Washington St., Shelby, North Carolina
- Coordinates: 35°17′14″N 81°32′20″W
- Area: 0.8 acres (0.32 ha)
- Built: 1852, 1907
- Architectural style: Colonial Revival, Italianate
- NRHP reference No.: 80002812
- Added to NRHP: September 29, 1980

Webbley, also known as the O. Max Gardner House, is a historic home located at Shelby, Cleveland County, North Carolina. It was built in 1852, and overbuilt in 1907 in the Colonial Revival style. It is a two-story frame dwelling with a low-pitched hip roof, flat roof deck, and roof balustrade. It has two hip roof rear ells. The front facade features a full-height, flat-roof portico supported by fluted Ionic order columns. The home acquired its named shortly after it was bought by James L. Webb in 1911. Webbley was the home of Governor Oliver Max Gardner (1882–1947) and his wife, Fay Webb-Gardner, from 1911 until his death.

It was listed on the National Register of Historic Places in 1980. The home was vacated in 1981 and vacant until it was purchased in 1989 by Oliver Max Gardner III and renovated. It opened as a bed and breakfast inn in 1993. It is located in the Central Shelby Historic District.
