= William B. Cooper (North Carolina politician) =

American politician (1867–1959)

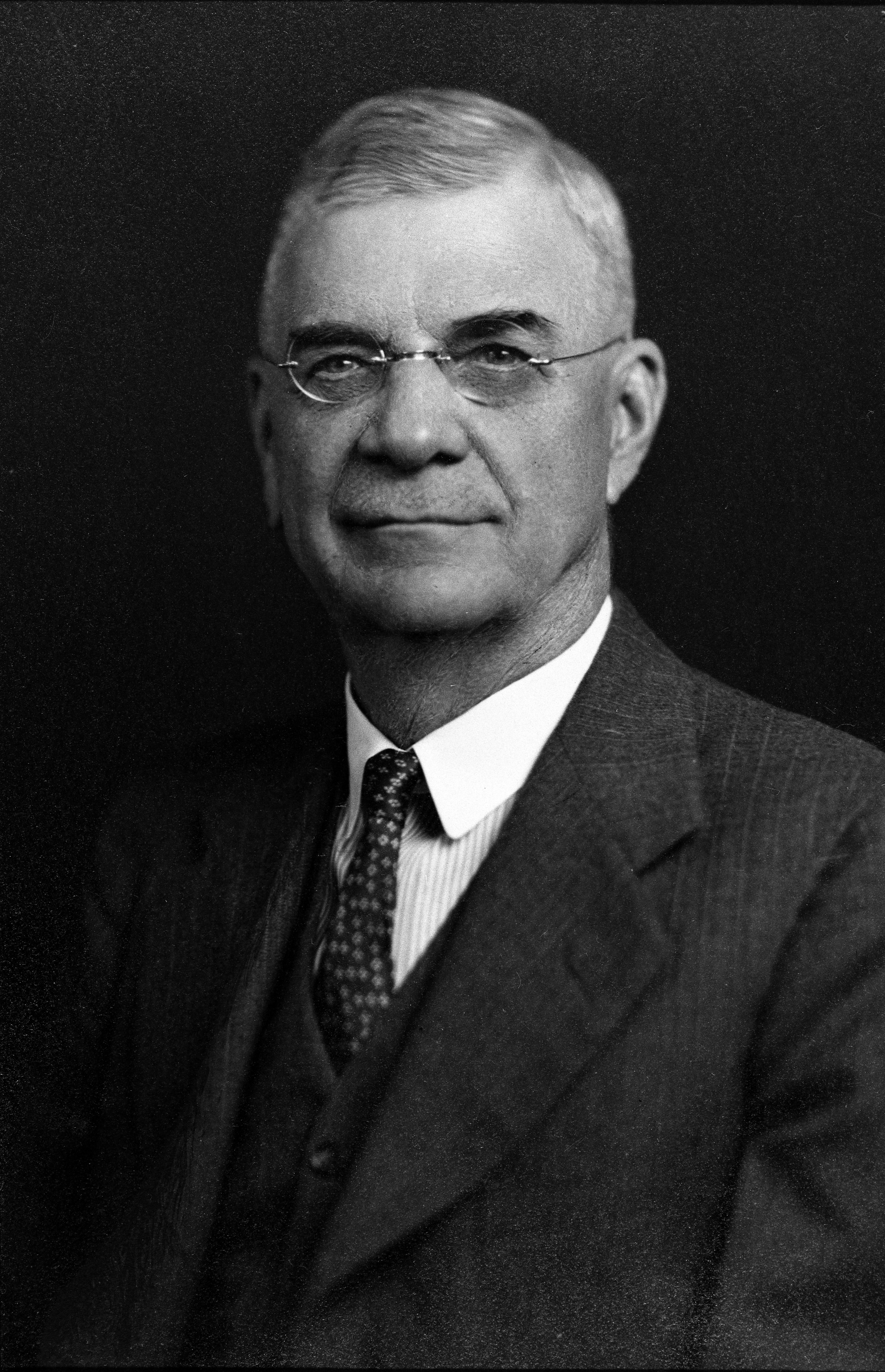

14th Lieutenant Governor of North Carolina
- Governor: Cameron A. Morrison
- Preceded by: Oliver Max Gardner
- Succeeded by: J. Elmer Long

Personal details
- Born: William Bryant Cooper; January 22, 1867 Cool Spring, South Carolina, U.S.
- Died: November 1, 1959 (aged 92)
- Party: Democratic
- Occupation: Politician, banker, businessman

William Bryant Cooper (January 22, 1867 – November 1, 1959) was an American politician who served as the 14th lieutenant governor of North Carolina from 1921 to 1925, serving under Governor Cameron Morrison.

Cooper was born in Cool Spring, South Carolina, on January 22, 1867. He became a prominent banker and businessman in New Hanover County, North Carolina, serving as president of the Wilmington Chamber of Commerce and mayor pro tem from 1902 to 1903.

A Democrat, Cooper was elected over Fordyce C. Harding in the 1920 Democratic primary election and over Republican Irvin B. Tucker and Socialist H.C. Beuck in the general election. Under the state constitution of the time, he was not eligible to run for another term.

== Additional reading ==
- OurCampaigns.com
- Gore-Cooper Family Papers
- William Bryant Cooper/Frances Ada Gore Family

Party political offices
| Preceded by Oliver Max Gardner | Democratic nominee for Lieutenant Governor of North Carolina; 1920 | Succeeded by J. Elmer Long |
Political offices
| Preceded by Oliver Max Gardner | Lieutenant Governor of North Carolina; 1921-1925 | Succeeded by Jacob E. Long |
