= Edwin Y. Webb =

American judge

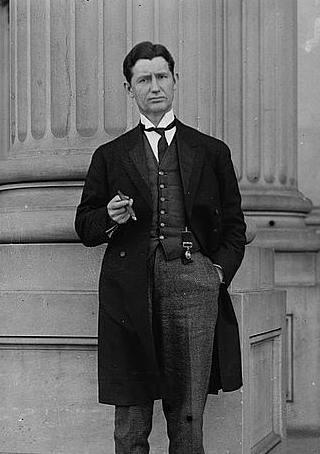
- Webb c. 1913

Senior Judge of the United States District Court for the Western District of North Carolina
- In office March 1, 1948 – February 7, 1955

Judge of the United States District Court for the Western District of North Carolina
- In office November 5, 1919 – March 1, 1948
- Appointed by: Woodrow Wilson
- Preceded by: Seat established 40 Stat. 1156
- Succeeded by: David Ezekiel Henderson

Member of the U.S. House of Representatives from North Carolina's 9th district
- In office March 4, 1903 – November 10, 1919
- Preceded by: James M. Moody
- Succeeded by: Clyde R. Hoey

Personal details
- Born: Edwin Yates Webb; May 23, 1872 Shelby, North Carolina
- Died: February 7, 1955 (aged 82) Wilmington, North Carolina
- Resting place: Sunset Cemetery; Shelby, North Carolina
- Party: Democratic
- Education: Wake Forest College (A.B.); University of North Carolina School of Law; University of Virginia School of Law

Edwin Yates Webb (May 23, 1872 – February 7, 1955) was a Democratic United States representative from North Carolina and a United States district judge of the United States District Court for the Western District of North Carolina.

== Education and career ==
Born on May 23, 1872, in Shelby, Cleveland County, North Carolina, Webb attended the Shelby Military Institute and received an Artium Baccalaureus degree in 1893 from Wake Forest College, then attended the University of North Carolina School of Law in 1893 and 1894. He was admitted to the bar and entered private practice in Shelby starting in 1894. He attended the University of Virginia School of Law in 1896 and completed a postgraduate course. He was a member of the North Carolina Senate in 1901. Webb was appointed a trustee of Wake Forest College in 1898. He was appointed trustee of the Agricultural and Mechanical College of Raleigh (now North Carolina State University) by the legislature in 1899 and served two years. He was Chairman of the Democratic senatorial district in 1896. He was Chairman of the Democratic county executive committee from 1898 to 1902. He was temporary Chairman of the Democratic State convention in 1900.

== Congressional service ==
Webb was elected as a Democrat to the United States House of Representatives of the 58th United States Congress and to the eight succeeding Congresses and served from March 4, 1903, to November 10, 1919, when he resigned to accept a federal judgeship. He was Chairman of the United States House Committee on the Judiciary for the 63rd through 65th United States Congresses. He was one of the managers appointed by the House of Representatives in 1912 to conduct impeachment proceedings against Robert W. Archbald, judge of the United States Commerce Court. On April 17, 1918, Congressman Webb, as the sole sponsor, introduced the Sedition Act of 1918 legislation in the U.S. House (H.R. 8753), that criminalized speech or the expression of opinion criticizing the U.S. government war effort, military or flag. It amended the Espionage Act of 1917. It was signed into law on May 16, 1918, by president Woodrow Wilson. The law was repealed on December 13, 1920.

== Federal judicial service ==
Webb was nominated by President Woodrow Wilson on October 30, 1919, to the United States District Court for the Western District of North Carolina, to a new seat authorized by 40 Stat. 1156. He was confirmed by the United States Senate on November 5, 1919, and received his commission the same day. He assumed senior status on March 1, 1948. His service terminated on February 7, 1955, due to his death while visiting Wilmington, North Carolina. He was interred in Sunset Cemetery in Shelby.

== Family and views on suffrage ==
Webb was the brother of politician James L. Webb and the uncle of Fay Webb-Gardner, the wife of O. Max Gardner. In debates within the North Carolina Democratic Party over women's suffrage in the late 1910s and early 1920s, Congressman Webb was opposed, while Gardner led those who supported the idea of granting the right to vote to women.

== Sources ==
- "Edwin Yates Webb". Biographical Directory of the United States Congress.

U.S. House of Representatives
Preceded by James M. Moody	Member of the United States House of Representatives from North Carolina's 9th congressional district 1903–1919	Succeeded by Clyde R. Hoey
Legal offices
Preceded by Seat established by 40 Stat. 1156	Judge of the United States District Court for the Western District of North Carolina; 1919–1948	Succeeded by David Ezekiel Henderson
