= Episcopal Cemetery (Elizabeth City, North Carolina) =

Historic district in North Carolina, United States

- U.S. National Register of Historic Places
- U.S. Historic district
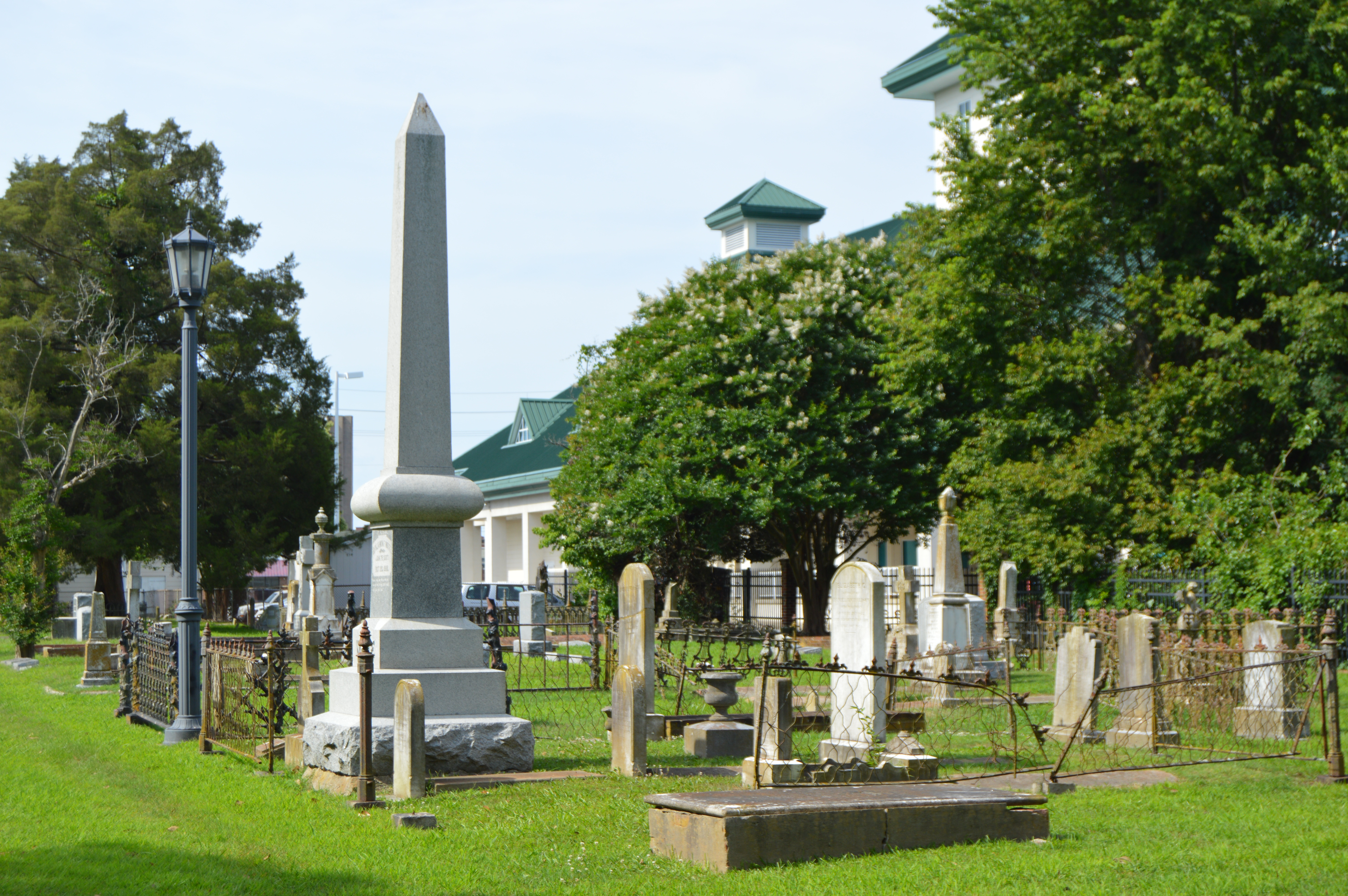
- Southern section

- Location within North Carolina Location within the United States
- Location: 505 E. Ehringhaus St., Elizabeth City, North Carolina
- Coordinates: 36°17′46″N 76°13′14″W
- Area: 1.5 acres (0.61 ha)
- Built: 1825
- Architect: T.M. Caffrey; Blesser and Co.
- MPS: Elizabeth City MPS
- NRHP reference No.: 94000386
- Added to NRHP: April 21, 1994

The Episcopal Cemetery is a historic Episcopal cemetery and national historic district located at Elizabeth City, Pasquotank County, North Carolina. It is a 1.5-acre (0.61 ha) cemetery that was opened in 1825. In 1994, it included one contributing site, 26 contributing structures, and 56 contributing objects. The cemetery is the burial place of John C. B. Ehringhaus and Tillie Ehringhaus, Governor and First Lady of North Carolina from 1933 to 1937.

It was listed on the National Register of Historic Places in 1994.
