= Richard T. Fountain =

American politician

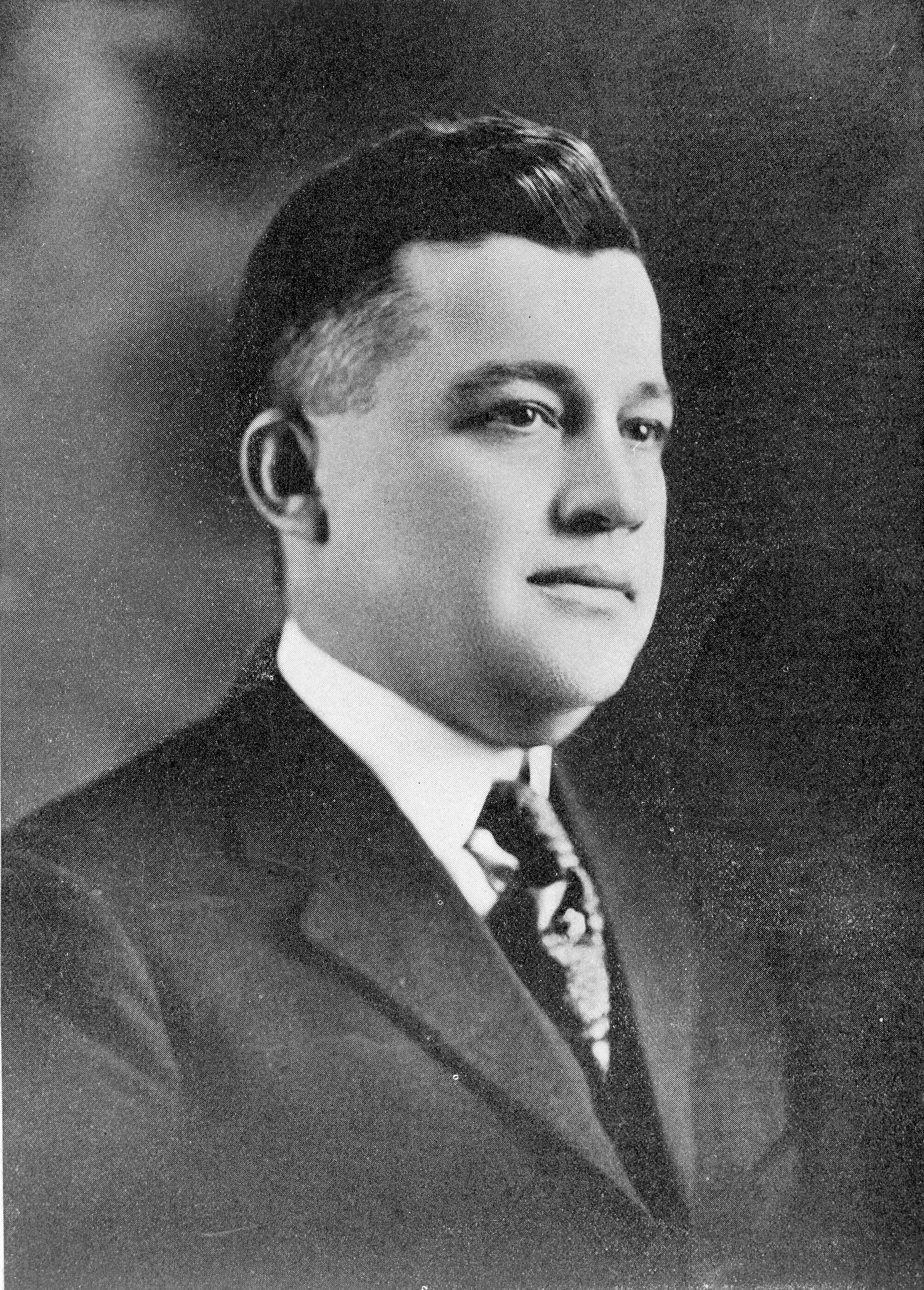
Dick Fountain

Richard (Dick) Tillman Fountain (February 15, 1885 – February 21, 1945) was a North Carolina politician who served as Speaker of the North Carolina House of Representatives in 1927 and as the 16th Lieutenant Governor of North Carolina from 1929 to 1933 under Governor Oliver M. Gardner.

Fountain was born in Edgecombe County, North Carolina, on February 15, 1885, and was educated in the public schools of Edgecombe County and the Tarboro Male Academy, and attended the University of North Carolina at Chapel Hill from 1905 to 1907. Fountain was admitted to the N.C. Bar and began practicing law in Rocky Mount in 1907. He was appointed judge of the municipal court of the city of Rocky Mount in 1911 and held the office until 1918. He was also a trustee of the Rocky Mount Graded Schools (1917–1935), secretary to the board of trustees (1917–1921), and the chairman of the board (1924–1931).

In 1918 Fountain was elected to the North Carolina House of Representatives, where he served five unopposed terms and was elected speaker in 1927. After serving one term as lieutenant governor (the maximum then allowed), Fountain ran for governor in 1932, but lost in a Democratic primary runoff to John C.B. Ehringhaus. From 1934 until 1942 Fountain edited a newspaper, the Rocky Mount Herald. In 1936 and 1942 he ran unsuccessfully in the primary for the U.S. Senate against the incumbent senator, Josiah W. Bailey. On February 21, 1945, Fountain died in Rocky Mount at the age of sixty.

In playing the role of Moses in North Carolina politics—he was allowed to see "the Promised Land," but not allowed to enter it—"Dick" Fountain demonstrated that the ancient political system of slapping backs and admiring babies is still an effective one in "dry" North Carolina.

— The State magazine

Party political offices
Preceded by J. Elmer Long	Democratic nominee for Lieutenant Governor of North Carolina; 1928	Succeeded by Alexander H. Graham
Political offices
Preceded by Edgar W. Pharr	Speaker of the North Carolina House of Representatives; 1927-1929	Succeeded by Alexander H. Graham
Preceded by Jacob E. Long	Lieutenant Governor of North Carolina; 1929-1933	Succeeded by Alexander H. Graham
