= Lieutenant Governor of North Carolina =

Second-highest elected official in the U.S. state of North Carolina

- State seal

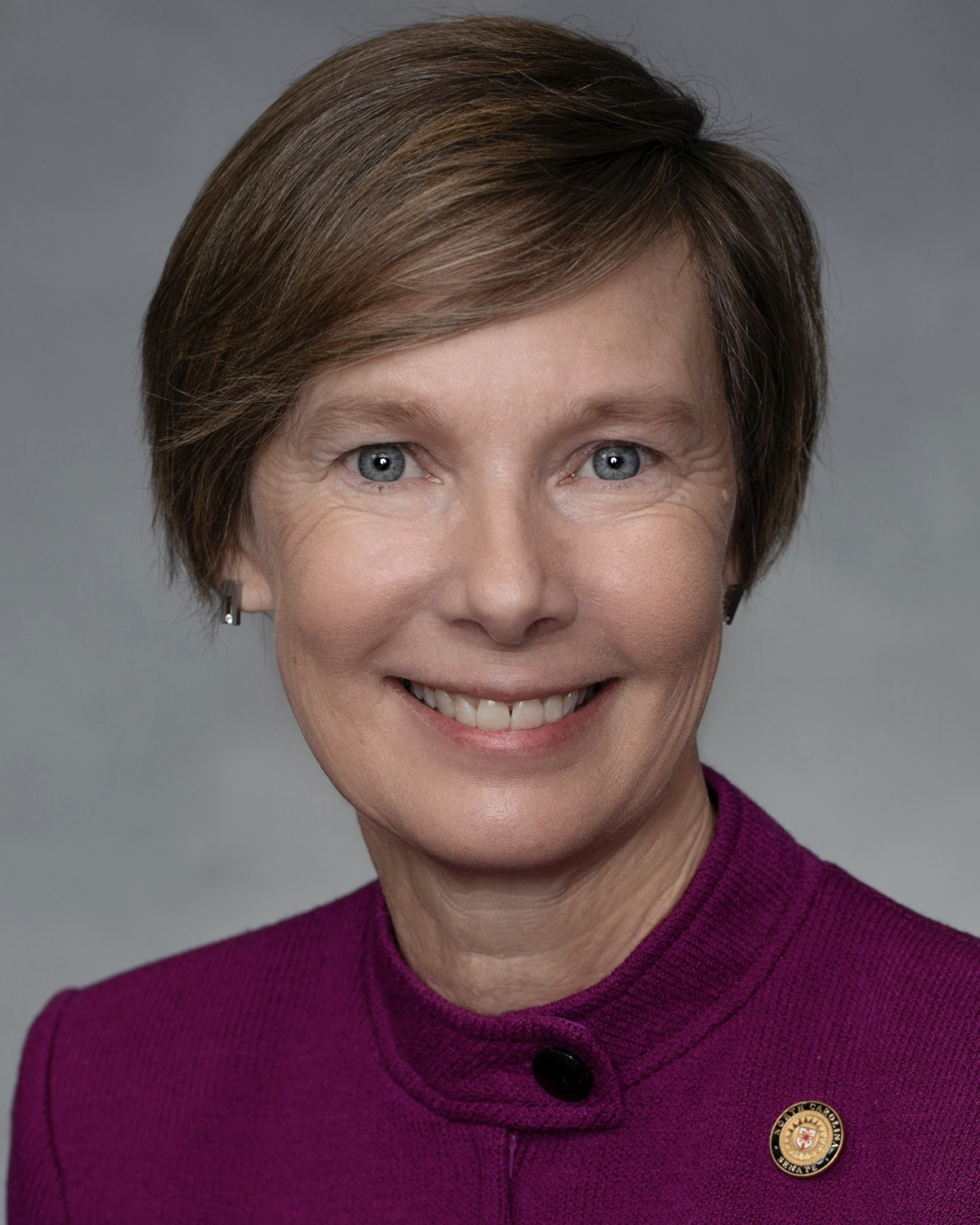
- Incumbent; Rachel Hunt since January 1, 2025
- Style: Lieutenant Governor (informal); The Honorable (formal); Madame President (as President of the Senate)
- Member of: Council of State; Board of Education; Capital Planning Commission; Board of Community Colleges
- Residence: Hawkins-Hartness House (official office)
- Seat: Raleigh, North Carolina
- Term length: Four years, renewable once consecutively
- Constituting instrument: North Carolina Constitution of 1868
- Inaugural holder: Tod R. Caldwell
- Formation: 1868
- Succession: First
- Salary: US$168,384 per year (2025)
- Website: Official website

The lieutenant governor of North Carolina is the second-highest elected official in the U.S. state of North Carolina and is the only elected official to have powers in both the legislative and executive branches of state government. A member of the North Carolina Council of State, the lieutenant governor serves a four-year term with a two consecutive term limit. The current lieutenant governor is Rachel Hunt, a Democrat, who has held the office since 2025. The Constitution of North Carolina designates the lieutenant governor the ex officio president of the State Senate and a member of the State Board of Education. They are also required to serve as acting governor of the state in the event of the governor's absence, and assume the governorship in the event it becomes vacant.

Five lieutenant governors have succeeded to the governorship throughout the office's history due to a vacancy. The constitution allows the governor and General Assembly to assign the lieutenant governor additional duties, and the lieutenant governor has thus been accorded membership on and responsibility for several appointments on other state boards. Unlike other Council of State offices, there is no mechanism to fill a vacancy in the lieutenant governorship between elections. From its creation in 1868 up until the 1970s, the lieutenant governorship was a single-term, part-time position largely confined to legislative duties when the General Assembly was in session. Most of the candidates who sought the office were veteran legislators seeking a final prestigious accomplishment for their careers. In 1971, new legislation declared it a full-time job.

In 1972, the Democratic-controlled General Assembly expanded the office's resources to challenge the incoming Republican governor. In 1977, the lieutenant governor was constitutionally authorized to serve two consecutive terms. The office's political prominence increased over the years following the succession amendment and the legislature continued to expand its powers. Upon a Republican's assumption of lieutenant gubernatorial office in 1989, Democrats in the Senate modified the body's rules, stripping the office of its long-standing powers to appoint committees in that house and assign bills to those committees. With the shift away from legislative duties, the office became increasingly used as a means to enhance its incumbents' bids for higher office; lieutenant governors have often run for governor, but few have been successful.

== History ==
Under North Carolina's first constitution in 1776, the state's executive authority was exercised by the governor. It accorded the duty of presiding over the North Carolina Senate to a speaker of the Senate, who was also to act as governor in case that office became vacant. An attempt was made to create an office of lieutenant governor during the state's 1865 constitutional convention but was rejected by a majority of the delegates as being unnecessary. The office of lieutenant governor was created by the state's 1868 constitution. The lieutenant governor—who was to be chosen by popular election—replaced the speaker of the Senate as that body's presiding officer and assumed the former office's role in succeeding to the governorship in the event it became vacant. Furthermore, the constitution made the official an ex officio member of the newly created State Board of Education.

From 1868 until 1970, presiding over the Senate was the lieutenant governor's primary role, and in that capacity they appointed senators to committees (a power accorded to them by Senate rules) and oversaw the passage of legislation. (Note: Historically, some state statutes regarding this official's responsibilities have used "lieutenant governor" and "president of the Senate" interchangeably.) The job was a part-time position, since the lieutenant governor served only when the General Assembly was in session or in the absence of the governor. What other functions they performed were largely ceremonial, and the office attracted little public attention. From 1943 to 1954, by informal arrangement, the official chaired the State Board of Education. Constitutional revisions which took effect in 1971 made the lieutenant governor a member of the Council of State. The Executive Reorganization Act of 1971 affirmed the role of lieutenant governor as a full-time job. With the election of James Holshouser as governor in 1972—the first Republican to win the office in decades—the Democratic majority in the General Assembly was compelled to raise the stature of the office of the lieutenant governor, which was held by Democrat Jim Hunt. It raised the job's salary from $5,000 to $30,000 per year, increased the office operating budget, and expanded its staff from two to five.

From 1868 to 1977, the lieutenant governor and the governor were limited to standalone four-year terms. In 1977, the state constitution was amended to allow both the governor and the lieutenant governor to serve two consecutive terms. James C. Green, who served from 1977 to 1985, was the first lieutenant governor to serve consecutive terms. The office's political prominence increased over the years following the succession amendment and the legislature continued to expand its powers. Green led the Senate in an effort at the onset of his term to make the lieutenant governor the ex officio chair of the State Board of Education by law, directly challenging the authority of Hunt, who had since become governor and was responsible for recommending the board's chair. The proposal was ultimately defeated in the House of Representatives.

Despite this, the legislature granted the lieutenant governor automatic membership on several state boards and significant appointment responsibilities. By 1982, North Carolina had one of the most powerful lieutenant governorships in the country. By 1989, the lieutenant governor was responsible for 195 appointments to 87 state boards (106 of these were subject to legislative confirmation). Despite this, the officials experienced mistrust from the Senate and faced several unsuccessful attempts to strip them of their appointive powers. From 1985 to 1989, Democrat Robert B. Jordan served as lieutenant governor while Republican James G. Martin served as governor, making him the de facto leader of the North Carolina Democratic Party. Upon Republican Jim Gardner's assumption of lieutenant gubernatorial office in 1989, Democrats in the Senate modified the body's rules, stripping the office of its powers to appoint committees in that house and assign bills to its committees. During Gardner's tenure, the office's staff was further expanded. In 1997 the General Assembly debated modifying the constitution to provide for the election of the lieutenant governor on a joint ticket with the governor or to have the office assume the responsibilities of the North Carolina Secretary of State, but these proposals did not move forward. Another effort in 2015 to amend the constitution to provide for the office's joint ticket election with the governor failed.

Three lieutenant governors assumed the office of governor upon the death of the incumbent: Curtis H. Brogden in 1874, Thomas M. Holt in 1891, and Luther H. Hodges in 1954. Tod R. Caldwell in 1870 assumed the office upon the previous governor's impeachment and removal, and Thomas J. Jarvis assumed it in 1879 upon the incumbent's resignation. Historically, the lieutenant governorship was often sought by veteran state legislators as a final prestigious accomplishment for their careers. With the shift away from legislative duties after the 1970s, the office became increasingly used as a means to enhance incumbents' bids for higher office; lieutenant governors have often run for governor, but few have been successful. Bev Perdue was the first woman to serve as lieutenant governor, while Mark Robinson, sworn in in 2021, was the first black person to ever be elected to the office. The incumbent, Rachel Hunt, was sworn in on January 1, 2025.

== Election ==
As with other state officials, only qualified voters in North Carolina are eligible to be elected lieutenant governor. Unlike most other candidates, who must be at least 21 years of age, any potential lieutenant governor—like the governor—must be at least 30 years of age. They must also have been a citizen of the United States for at least five years and a resident of North Carolina for at least two years preceding election. Like the governor, the lieutenant governor is elected every four years thereafter, but is elected on their own ticket. Contested elections for the office of lieutenant governor are resolved by a majority vote of the General Assembly. Their term of office begins on January 1 following their election. They serve for a four-year term and until their successor has assumed office. The lieutenant governor is limited to serving two consecutive terms in office, with no limits on nonconsecutive terms.

== Powers, duties, and structure ==
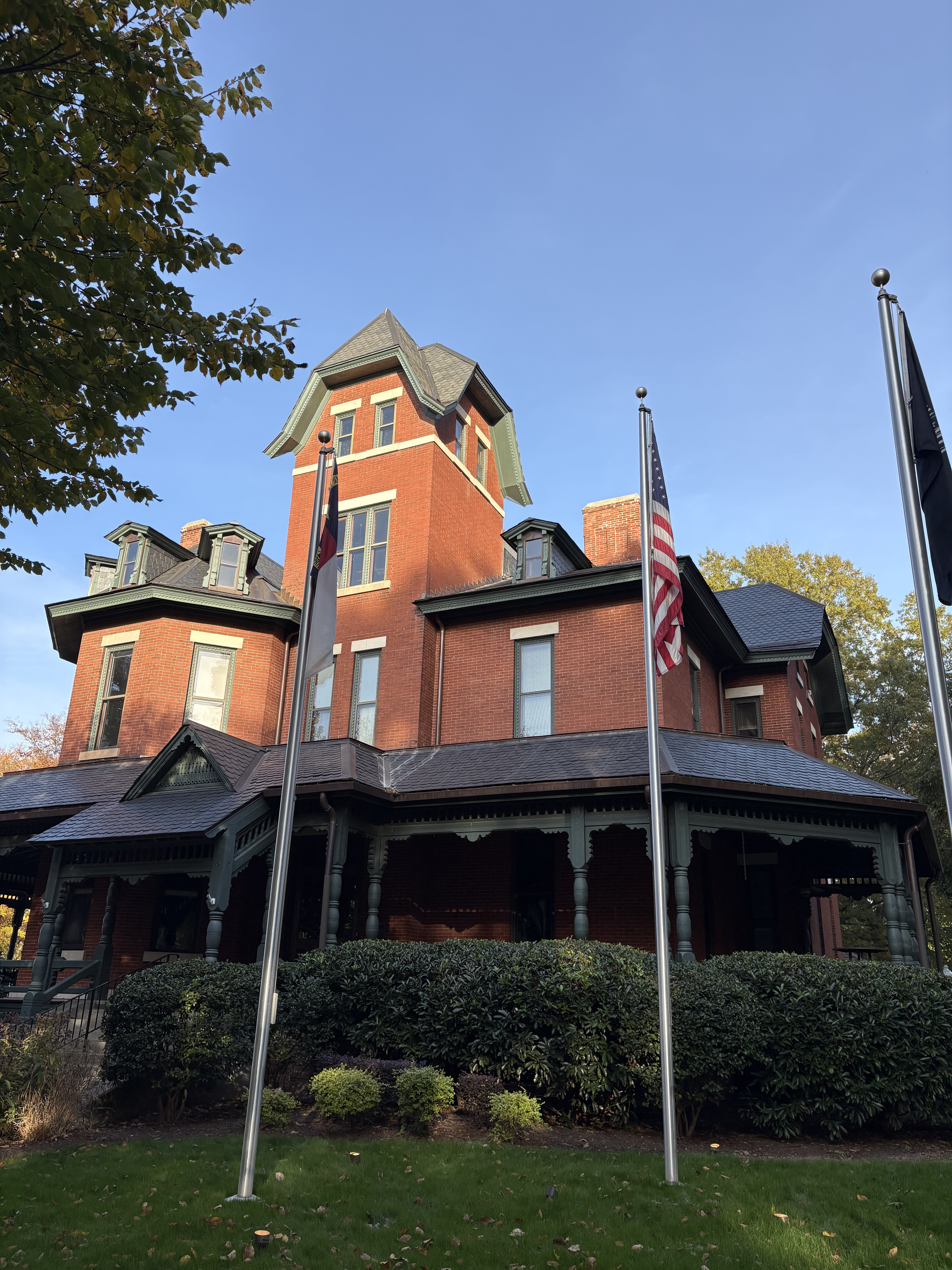
The lieutenant governor's office is located in the Hawkins-Hartness House (pictured) in Raleigh.

The lieutenant governor is the only officer in North Carolina vested with responsibilities in both the executive and legislative branches of state government. The constitution designates the lieutenant governor the President of the Senate. In this capacity they direct the debate on bills and maintain order in that house, but have little influence over its workflow. They cannot cast a vote in the Senate except to break ties. In the event of a gubernatorial vacancy, the constitution requires the lieutenant governor to assume the governorship. If the governor is temporarily incapacitated or absent, the lieutenant governor is to serve as acting governor. (Note: There is little case law in North Carolina concerning the lieutenant governor's role when the governor is absent from the state. Legal analysts disagree over the applicability of succession in the circumstances of travel in recent years, as the governor may be able to maintain contact their subordinates while away from the state.) In the event the governor-elect fails to qualify for their office, the lieutenant governor-elect becomes governor.

The constitution makes the lieutenant governor ex officio a member of the North Carolina Board of Education and one of the ten state officers who comprise the Council of State. They are also ex officio a member of the North Carolina Capital Planning Commission, the State Board of Community Colleges, and the State Board of Economic Development. They have the power to appoint some members of other executive state boards, though state law does not grant them the power to create their own official boards. The constitution allows the governor and General Assembly to assign the lieutenant governor additional duties. State law empowers the lieutenant governor to oversee the awarding of the North Carolina Medal of Valor for law enforcement officers.

The lieutenant governor's office is located in the Hawkins-Hartness House on Blount Street in Raleigh. They also have an office in the North Carolina State Legislative Building. They retain a staff to assist in carrying out their functions. As of January 2025, the office has eight employees retained under the terms of the State Human Resources Act. They are provided with a security detail supplied by the North Carolina Highway Patrol. As with all Council of State officers, the lieutenant governor's salary is fixed by the General Assembly and cannot be reduced during their term of office. As of 2025, the lieutenant governor's annual salary is $168,384.

== Removal and vacancies ==
Unlike with other officers on the Council of State, the governor of North Carolina cannot appoint an interim officer in the event the lieutenant governor's office becomes vacant. In such an instance, the lieutenant governor's role in the Senate is assumed by the president pro tempore. In the event that the lieutenant governor is impeached by the North Carolina House of Representatives, the chief justice of the North Carolina Supreme Court presides over the court of impeachment, composed at minimum of a majority of the members of the State Senate. A two-thirds affirmative vote of the senators present constitutes a conviction and thus removal and future disqualification from holding office. Avenues for removing the lieutenant governor from office in circumstances other than impeachment—such as a lack of physical or mental capacity—may be determined by law.

== List of lieutenant governors ==
Parties

Democratic (30) Republican (6)

#	Image	Lieutenant governor	Term of office	Political party	Governor(s)
1		Tod R. Caldwell	1868–1870	Republican	William W. Holden (R)
Office vacant 1870–1873
2		Curtis H. Brogden	1873–1874	Republican	Tod R. Caldwell (R)
Office vacant 1874–1877
3		Thomas J. Jarvis	1877–1879	Democratic	Zebulon B. Vance (D)
Office vacant 1879–1881
4		James L. Robinson	1881–1885	Democratic	Thomas J. Jarvis (D)
5		Charles M. Stedman	1885–1889	Democratic	Alfred Moore Scales (D)
6		Thomas M. Holt	1889–1891	Democratic	Daniel Gould Fowle (D)
Office vacant 1891–1893
7		Rufus A. Doughton	1893–1897	Democratic	Elias Carr (D)
8		Charles A. Reynolds	1897–1901	Republican	Daniel Lindsay Russell (R)
9		Wilfred D. Turner	1901–1905	Democratic	Charles Brantley Aycock (D)
10		Francis D. Winston	1905–1909	Democratic	Robert Broadnax Glenn (D)
11		William C. Newland	1909–1913	Democratic	William Walton Kitchin (D)
12		Elijah L. Daughtridge	1913–1917	Democratic	Locke Craig (D)
13		Oliver Max Gardner	1917–1921	Democratic	Thomas Walter Bickett (D)
14		William B. Cooper	1921–1925	Democratic	Cameron A. Morrison (D)
15		J. Elmer Long	1925–1929	Democratic	Angus Wilton McLean (D)
16		Richard T. Fountain	1929–1933	Democratic	Oliver Max Gardner (D)
17		Alexander H. Graham	1933–1937	Democratic	John C. B. Ehringhaus (D)
18		Wilkins P. Horton	1937–1941	Democratic	Clyde R. Hoey (D)
19		Reginald L. Harris	1941–1945	Democratic	J. Melville Broughton (D)
20		Lynton Y. Ballentine	1945–1949	Democratic	R. Gregg Cherry (D)
21		Hoyt Patrick Taylor	1949–1953	Democratic	W. Kerr Scott (D)
22		Luther H. Hodges	1953–1954	Democratic	William B. Umstead (D)
Office vacant 1954–1957
23		Luther E. Barnhardt	1957–1961	Democratic	Luther H. Hodges (D)
24		Harvey Cloyd Philpott	1961	Democratic	Terry Sanford (D)
Office vacant 1961–1965
25		Robert W. Scott	1965–1969	Democratic	Dan K. Moore (D)
26		Hoyt Patrick Taylor Jr.	1969–1973	Democratic	Robert W. Scott (D)
27		Jim Hunt	1973–1977	Democratic	James Holshouser (R)
28		James C. Green	1977–1985	Democratic	Jim Hunt (D)
29		Robert B. Jordan	1985–1989	Democratic	James G. Martin (R)
30		Jim Gardner	1989–1993	Republican	James G. Martin (R)
31		Dennis Wicker	1993–2001	Democratic	Jim Hunt (D)
32		Bev Perdue	2001–2009	Democratic	Mike Easley (D)
33		Walter Dalton	2009–2013	Democratic	Bev Perdue (D)
34		Dan Forest	2013–2021	Republican	Pat McCrory (R) (2013–2017)
34		Dan Forest	2013–2021	Republican	Roy Cooper (D) (2017–2021)
35		Mark Robinson	2021–2025	Republican	Roy Cooper (D)
36		Rachel Hunt	2025–present	Democratic	Josh Stein (D)

== Works cited ==
- Adams, Steve; Bostic, Richard (November 1982). "The Lieutenant Governor – A Legislative or Executive Office?" (PDF). N.C. Insight. N.C. Center for Public Policy Research. pp. 2–10.
- Baxter, Andy (September 1990). "A Short Constitutional History of Public School Governance in North Carolina, 1776-1990" (PDF). N.C. Insight. N.C. Center for Public Policy Research. pp. 13–14.
- Coble, Ran (April 1989). "The Lieutenant Governorship in North Carolina : An Office in Transition" (PDF). N.C. Insight. N.C. Center for Public Policy Research. pp. 157–165.
- Cooper, Christopher A.; Knotts, H. Gibbs, eds. (2012). The New Politics of North Carolina. Chapel Hill: University of North Carolina Press. ISBN 9781469606583.
- Fleer, Jack (2007). Governors Speak. University Press of America. ISBN 9780761835646.
- Fleer, Jack D. (1994). North Carolina Government & Politics. Lincoln: University of Nebraska Press. ISBN 9780803268852.
- North Carolina Manual (PDF). Raleigh: North Carolina Department of the Secretary of State. 2011. OCLC 2623953. Archived from the original (PDF) on August 2, 2023.
- Orth, John V.; Newby, Paul M. (2013). The North Carolina State Constitution (second ed.). Oxford University Press. ISBN 9780199300655.
- Raper, Horace W. (1985). William W. Holden: North Carolina's Political Enigma. Chapel Hill: University of North Carolina Press. ISBN 0807850608.
