= Oliver Max Gardner =

American politician (1882–1947)

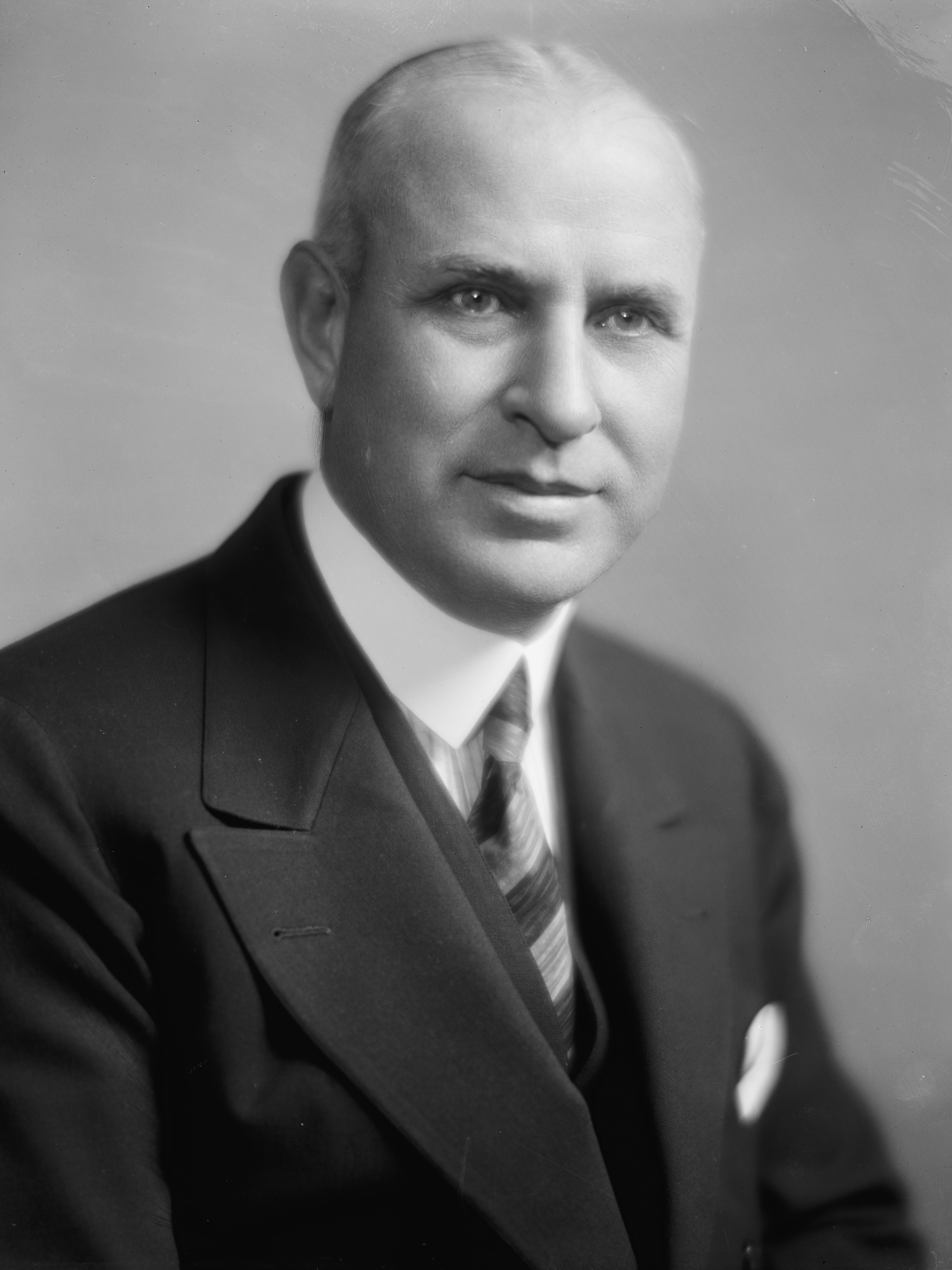

Under Secretary of the Treasury
- In office 1946–1947
- President: Harry S. Truman
- Preceded by: Daniel W. Bell
- Succeeded by: A. L. M. Wiggins

57th Governor of North Carolina
- In office January 11, 1929 – January 5, 1933
- Lieutenant: Richard T. Fountain
- Preceded by: Angus Wilton McLean
- Succeeded by: John C. B. Ehringhaus

13th Lieutenant Governor of North Carolina
- In office January 11, 1917 – January 12, 1921
- Governor: Thomas W. Bickett
- Preceded by: Elijah L. Daughtridge
- Succeeded by: William B. Cooper

Member of the North Carolina Senate

Personal details
- Born: March 22, 1882 Shelby, North Carolina, U.S.
- Died: February 6, 1947 (aged 64) Manhattan, New York City, U.S.
- Party: Democratic
- Spouse: Fay Webb
- Education: North Carolina State University; University of North Carolina School of Law

Oliver Max Gardner (March 22, 1882 – February 6, 1947) was an American politician who served as the 57th governor of the U.S. state of North Carolina from 1929 to 1933. A member of the Democratic Party, Gardner worked in the administrations of President Franklin Delano Roosevelt and Harry S. Truman.

== Early years and education ==
Gardner was born on March 22, 1882, in Shelby, North Carolina, orphaned at a young age. He attended North Carolina State University (then known as North Carolina A & M) on a scholarship, where he majored in chemical engineering, was involved in ROTC, played on the football team, managed the baseball team, served as the senior class president, and maintained active membership in Sigma Nu fraternity. Gardner was selected by John Heisman, then coach at Clemson for his All-Southern team in 1903. As a player, he weighed 212 pounds. He later taught organic chemistry on campus after graduating in 1903. He then enrolled at the University of North Carolina School of Law, where he also played football. Gardner distinguished himself off the football field as well, becoming one of the most respected members of the Dialectic and Philanthropic Societies at University of North Carolina at Chapel Hill. Gardner was the only person ever to captain the football teams of both the North Carolina Tar Heels and the NC State Wolfpack.

== Political career ==
Gardner returned to Shelby to practice law and married Fay Webb, daughter of prominent politician James L. Webb and niece of Congressman Edwin Y. Webb.

Gardner was elected as a state senator from Cleveland County, North Carolina and served one term as President Pro Tempore of the North Carolina Senate. He served a term as the 13th Lieutenant Governor of North Carolina (1917–1921). In 1920, he lost the Democratic nomination for governor to Cameron Morrison. The election was likely stolen by the political machine of U.S. Sen. Furnifold Simmons, who, through his lieutenant, A. D. Watts, used racial demagoguery and electoral fraud to favor their candidate, Morrison. Gardner led in the initial vote count, but after several days of counting, more votes for Morrison were "found" in western North Carolina, and Morrison won the June primary by 87 votes. Gardner lost the runoff to Morrison by a wider margin.

Gardner made peace with Sen. Simmons. He agreed to support Simmons's favored candidate for governor in 1924, Angus Wilton McLean, in exchange for Simmons supporting Gardner when he ran for governor again in 1928. While Gardner was out of politics, he pursued business interests, including a textile mill.

== Governor ==
Easily elected governor in 1928, Gardner assumed control over a state that was in debt and soon had to deal with the effects of the Great Depression. Gardner commissioned a report by the Brookings Institution on how to cut costs in government and cut local property taxes. Gardner pushed many of the Brookings recommendations through the legislature, including taking over financial responsibility for roads and schools from counties and the creation of what would become the consolidated University of North Carolina system. He reorganized and reformed the state government.

Although a liberal supporter of Franklin D. Roosevelt and an advocate of labor rights, Gardner took a pro-business, anti-union stance in a period of labor unrest, including the Loray Mill Strike. He did, however, push through the legislature a workman's compensation law and successfully mediated a massive 1932 strike of mill workers in the Greensboro–High Point area.

== Later years ==
After leaving the governor's mansion (governors of the state were then barred from seeking re-election), Gardner practiced law and lobbied in Washington, D.C. He was an informal advisor and speech-writer for President Franklin D. Roosevelt, who appointed him chairman of the advisory board to the Office of War Mobilization and Reconversion, and later a member of the Joint Anglo-American Commission on Palestine.

President Harry S. Truman appointed him Under Secretary of the Treasury (1946–47). In 1947, Gardner was appointed by Truman to be ambassador to the United Kingdom. Though, prior to ever arriving in London, Gardner died of Coronary thrombosis at The St. Regis Hotel in New York City on February 6, 1947.

== Legacy ==
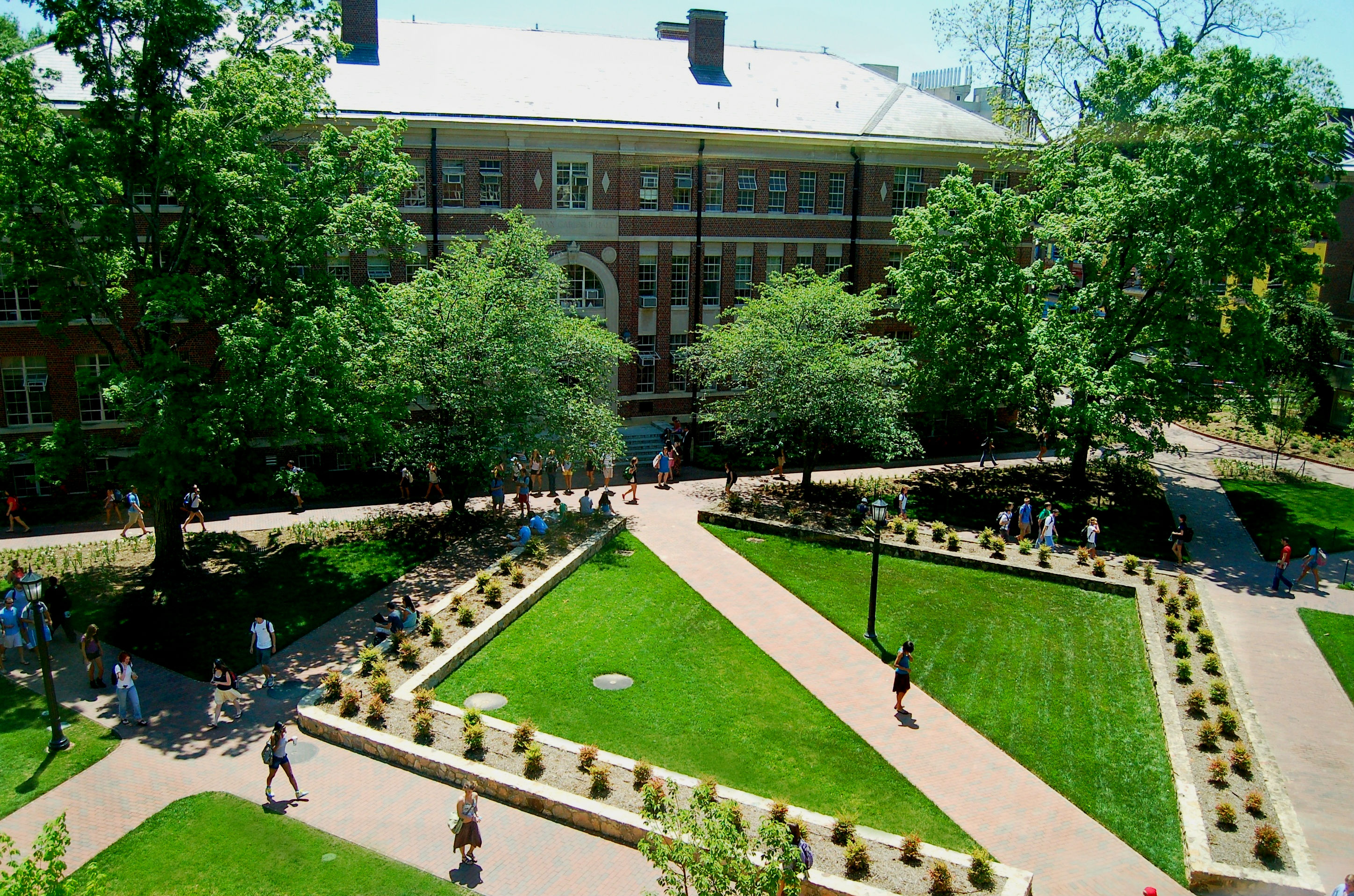
Gardner Hall at the University of North Carolina at Chapel Hill

Gardner founded the influential "Shelby Dynasty" or "Cleveland Dynasty" of politicians, which included Governor Clyde Hoey, the husband of his sister, Margaret Gardner Hoey. The pro-business organization controlled the North Carolina Democratic Party, and therefore, state politics, until 1948.

Gardner–Webb University is named for Gardner and his wife, Fay Webb-Gardner. The Fine Arts building at Gardner–Webb University is named for him as well. Gardner Hall, a dormitory at Appalachian State University, is also named for him, as is the economics building at the University of North Carolina at Chapel Hill, as is one of the biology buildings at North Carolina State University. The O. Max Gardner Award was established in his will to recognize University of North Carolina system faculty who have "made the greatest contributions to the welfare of the human race." It is the only award for which all faculty members of the 16 UNC campuses are eligible and is considered the UNC system's highest faculty honor.

His home at Shelby, Webbley, was listed on the National Register of Historic Places in 1980.

== Notes ==
Party political offices
Preceded by Elijah L. Daughtridge	Democratic nominee for Lieutenant Governor of North Carolina; 1916	Succeeded by William B. Cooper
Preceded by Angus Wilton McLean	Democratic nominee for Governor of North Carolina; 1928	Succeeded by John C. B. Ehringhaus
Political offices
Preceded by Elijah L. Daughtridge	Lieutenant Governor of North Carolina; 1917–1921	Succeeded by William B. Cooper
Preceded by Angus Wilton McLean	Governor of North Carolina; 1929–1933	Succeeded by John C. B. Ehringhaus
