= Our State =

American monthly magazine

Our State Celebrating North Carolina
- Frequency: Monthly
- Founded: 1933
- Company: Mann Media
- Country: United States
- Based in: Greensboro, North Carolina
- Language: English
- Website: www.ourstate.com
- ISSN: 1092-0838

Our State (full title: Our State: Celebrating North Carolina) is a monthly magazine based in Greensboro, North Carolina, featuring travel and history articles and photographs about North Carolina people, places and events. First published in 1933 as The State magazine, the publication has become "the oldest regional publication of its kind in the country," according to the Associated Press. It is a member of the City and Regional Magazine Association (CRMA).

== History ==
Carl Goerch, a journalist known for his newspaper work as well as "Doings of the Legislature" on WPTF radio, told potential advertisers for his new publication that they could drop their ads after the first month if they were not worth the money. On June 3, 1933, The State printed its first issue, with 2500 copies sold at ten cents each. Goerch said that from the first issue, his magazine "met a very favorable impression and kept right on growing." Governor John C. B. Ehringhaus appeared on the earliest cover. Among those first advertisers who did not leave the weekly magazine were Wachovia and R.J. Reynolds Tobacco Company.

Bill Sharpe succeeded Goerch as publisher in 1951, and W.B. Wright took over in 1970. Shaw Publishing of Charlotte, later the owner of Business Journal Associates, became publisher in 1986 and sold the magazine to Mann Media in 1996. At the time, The State had 20,000 subscribers and published in black and white, with about 40 pages per issue. However, new publisher Bernard Mann, former owner of WGLD-AM and WGLD-FM in High Point, made a variety of changes, such including color and increasing the page count by six times. By 2008, the number of subscribers had jumped to 156,000. The name changed to Our State in order "to reflect the inclusive nature of the magazine," Mann said. In March 2018, Mann planned an employee buyout that will reward magazine employees with an employee stock ownership plan. Mann is retiring and he and his heirs will be bought out by the employees in 7–8 years.

Founded as a weekly publication in 1933, The State switched to biweekly issues in May 1954 (published every two weeks), and then to monthly issues starting in January 1973. Contributors over the years have included writer Billy Arthur, photographer Aycock Brown, and photographer Hugh Morton.

As of 2008, Our State had readers in all 50 states, as well as in 50 countries. Most were well-educated and over 40 years old. In an era when print publications were giving way to the Internet, Mann said his readers preferred seeing the magazine's photos on paper.

In 2012, Our State introduced an app called Travel North Carolina. In addition to great photography and entertaining stories, the magazine also has a store featuring handmade jewelry and pottery as well as local foods from across the state.

In 2018, owner Bernard Mann sold Our State to an Employee Stock Ownership Plan.

== TV series ==
UNC-TV airs a monthly TV series called Our State, which is based on the magazine. Started in 2004, the show won an Emmy Award in 2008 from The Nashville/Midsouth Chapter of the National Academy of Television Arts and Sciences for Best Magazine Series.

== Podcast ==
Our State has a podcast available at NPR member station WUNC in Chapel Hill.
