= Alexander H. Graham =

American attorney and politician

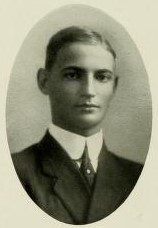
Graham c. 1912

Alexander H. Graham (August 9, 1890 – April 3, 1977) was a North Carolina attorney and politician who served as the 17th Lieutenant Governor of North Carolina from 1933 to 1937 under Governor John C. B. Ehringhaus.

Graham was born in Hillsborough, North Carolina on August 9, 1890. His father, Major John Washington Graham, was a five-term state senator. His grandfather, William Alexander Graham, had served as governor, United States senator, and Secretary of the Navy.

A. H. Graham, a graduate of Harvard Law School, served in the U.S. Army during World War I and later was elected to the North Carolina House of Representatives (1921–30). He was elected Speaker of the House in 1929. In 1930, Graham chaired the search committee that hired Frank Porter Graham (no known relation) as president of the University of North Carolina at Chapel Hill.

Limited to one term as lieutenant governor by the state constitution of the time, Graham ran for governor in 1936, but came in third in the Democratic primary, behind winner Clyde R. Hoey and runner-up Ralph W. McDonald.

Graham later served as head of the State Highway and Public Works Commission (1945–1949 and 1953–1957).

Party political offices
Preceded by Richard T. Fountain	Democratic nominee for Lieutenant Governor of North Carolina; 1932	Succeeded by Wilkins P. Horton
Political offices
Preceded by Richard T. Fountain	Speaker of the North Carolina House of Representatives; 1929	Succeeded by Willis Smith
Preceded by Richard T. Fountain	Lieutenant Governor of North Carolina; 1933-1937	Succeeded by Wilkins P. Horton
