= Alson Weber =

Canadian volleyball player (1910–2005)

Personal information
- Born: November 7, 1910; Waterloo, Ontario, Canada
- Died: December 29, 2005 (aged 95); Waterloo, Ontario, Canada

Alson Menno Weber (/ˈælsən ˈwiːbər/; November 7, 1910 – December 29, 2005) was a Canadian volleyball player. He played for the Kitchener-Waterloo Y.M.C.A. Volleyball Team from 1932 to 1946. The K-W YMCA team won the Ontario Senior Open Championship every year from 1932-1946, the Eastern Canadian Championship all three times that it was held in that period, and also many International Tournaments which involved Ontario and New York State teams.

In 1939 the K-W YMCA team competed at the United States National Championships. They were defeated by the Houston, Texas team, which went on to win the US national championship.

Weber's teammates included Carl Dunke, Jim McLeod, Delton Kropf, Henry Enns, Arthur Youngman, Lloyd Current and Morton Devitt. Alson Weber is honoured in the Waterloo County, Ontario and Canadian Sports Hall of Fame. The K-W YMCA team is also honoured in the Waterloo County Hall of Fame.

Weber spent the better part of his life in Waterloo, Ontario. He was predeceased by his wife, Lorraine Weber (Snyder) in 1988. He has three sons, John, Jim, and Ross.
