= Elijah L. Daughtridge =

American politician

Elijah Longstreet Daughtridge
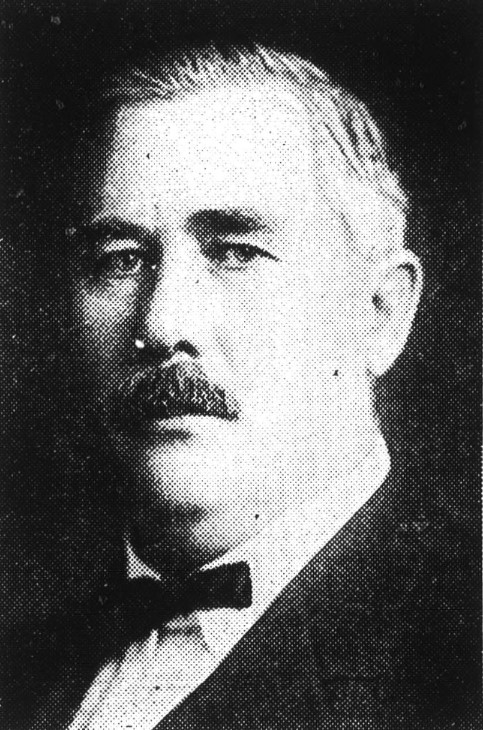

12th Lieutenant Governor of North Carolina
- In office January 15, 1913 – January 11, 1917
- Governor: Locke Craig
- Preceded by: William C. Newland
- Succeeded by: Oliver Max Gardner

Member of the North Carolina House of Representatives for Edgecombe County
- In office 1901–1903

Personal details
- Born: January 17, 1863 Edgecombe County, North Carolina
- Died: June 12, 1921 (aged 58) Rocky Mount, North Carolina

Elijah Longstreet Daughtridge (January 17, 1863 – June 12, 1921) was a North Carolina politician who served as the 12th Lieutenant Governor of North Carolina from 1913 to 1917.

Daughtridge was born near Rocky Mount, North Carolina on January 17, 1863. A farmer and Democrat, he was elected to the North Carolina House of Representatives from Edgecombe County for two terms (1901 and 1903). Daughtridge operated several businesses, was a Rocky Mount city alderman and Edgecombe County commissioner, served on the state Board of Agriculture and sat on the Board of Trustees of North Carolina State University.

He was elected Lt. Governor in 1912 with 38 percent in a three-way race. Barred from seeking a second term by the state constitution of the time, Daughtridge ran for Governor of North Carolina and lost to Thomas Bickett in the first gubernatorial primary election in state history.

Party political offices
Preceded by William C. Newland	Democratic nominee for Lieutenant Governor of North Carolina; 1912	Succeeded by Oliver Max Gardner
Political offices
Preceded by William C. Newland	Lieutenant Governor of North Carolina; 1913-1917	Succeeded by Oliver Max Gardner
