= Jacob Alson Long =

American lawyer

Jacob Alson Long (April 6, 1846 – October 4, 1923) was a lawyer in Graham, North Carolina. He was also one of the organizers of the original North Carolina branch of the Ku Klux Klan during the Reconstruction Era.

== Childhood ==
Jacob Alson Long was the sixth of eight children born to Jacob Long and Jane Long (née Stockard). Among his brothers was William Samual Long, first president of Elon College. After graduating from the Graham Institute, Jacob enrolled in the Hyco Academy in Virginia after his brother, Joseph Gibbs Long, was killed in the Civil War in 1863. Jacob Alson Long served briefly in Captain Wright’s Company of the Virginia Heavy Artillery.

== Law career ==
After serving in the Civil War, Jacob Alson Long studied law under attorney William Kirkland Ruffin.

== Klan activities ==
Jacob Alson Long was one of the organizers of the North Carolina Ku Klux Klan. Serving as the Chief of the County, he was instrumental in anchoring the Klan's activities in Alamance and Caswell Counties.

It is likely that Jacob Alson Long was involved (directly or indirectly) in the lynching of Wyatt Outlaw and the murder of John W. Stephens.
