= John C. B. Ehringhaus =

58th governor of North Carolina

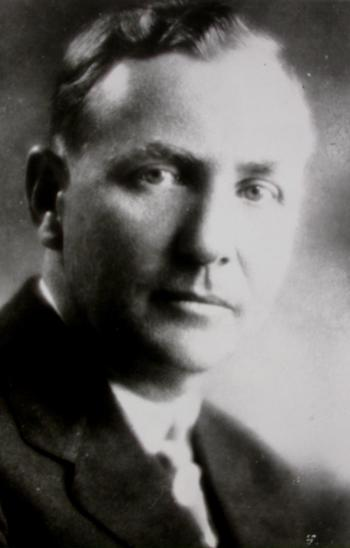

58th Governor of North Carolina
- In office January 5, 1933 – January 7, 1937
- Lieutenant: Alexander H. Graham
- Preceded by: Oliver Max Gardner
- Succeeded by: Clyde R. Hoey

Member of the North Carolina House of Representatives from Pasquotank County
- In office 1905–1909
- Preceded by: W.M. Hinton
- Succeeded by: Seth M. Morgan

Personal details
- Born: John Christoph Blucher Ehringhaus; February 5, 1882 Elizabeth City, North Carolina, U.S.
- Died: July 31, 1949 (aged 67) Raleigh, North Carolina, U.S.
- Party: Democratic
- Spouse: Matilda Haughton
- Children: 3
- Education: University of North Carolina, Chapel Hill (AB, LLB)
- Profession: Lawyer, politician, farmer

John Christoph Blucher Ehringhaus (February 5, 1882 – July 31, 1949) was an American politician who served as the 58th governor of North Carolina, serving from 1933 to 1937.

== Biography ==
He was born on February 5, 1882, in Elizabeth City, North Carolina. He was a descendent of German immigrant Johann Christoph Ehringhaus, who arrived in North Carolina in the early nineteenth-century and opened a bank in Elizabeth City. The Ehringhaus family remained involved in banking and law in Elizabeth City for generations.

Ehringhaus attended the University of North Carolina at Chapel Hill, he was a member of the Philanthropic society of the Dialectic and Philanthropic Societies from 1898 to 1902.

Ehringhaus was a member of the Benevolent and Protective Order of Elks (BPOE), Elizabeth City Lodge #856. He served as District Deputy Grand Exalted Ruler for the North Carolina East District of the BPOE, 1909-1910.

Governor O. Max Gardner coaxed Ehringhaus, a former state legislator and attorney, out of political retirement as his hand-picked successor. He narrowly defeated Lieutenant Governor Richard T. Fountain in a Democratic primary runoff. Fountain claimed Ehringhaus was the tool of business interests.

Serving the state during the Great Depression, Ehringhaus encouraged the North Carolina General Assembly to create a state agency that would help rural areas of the state receive electricity services in order to revive the lagging economy. He also cut state spending, successfully pushed for a three-cent sales tax, extended the school year and kept the schools open and solvent. A New Deal Democrat who supported progressive labor legislation, Ehringhaus also presided over a boiler inspection act during his time as governor.

He appointed former North Carolinian first lady Cora Lily Woodard Aycock as the President of the North Carolina Railroad.

He died on July 31, 1949.

== Legacy ==
Asked how to say his name, he told The Literary Digest "My name is pronounced as if spelled ear'en-house."

A dormitory at the University of North Carolina at Chapel Hill, Ehringhaus' alma mater (class of 1902) is named in his honor, and the Dialectic and Philanthropic Societies, of which Ehringhaus was a member, maintains a portrait in his honor.

The second longest bridge in the state of North Carolina, a 3.5-mile stretch over the Albemarle Sound, is named in honor of this former governor.

Ehringhaus' grave is located in the historic Episcopal Cemetery in his hometown of Elizabeth City in Northeastern North Carolina, and the city's main thoroughfare, Ehringhaus Street, is named in his honor.

Party political offices
Preceded by Oliver Max Gardner	Democratic nominee for Governor of North Carolina; 1932	Succeeded by Clyde R. Hoey
Political offices
Preceded by Oliver Max Gardner	Governor of North Carolina; 1933–1937	Succeeded by Clyde R. Hoey
