= Clyde R. Hoey =

American politician (1877-1954)

Clyde Roark Hoey
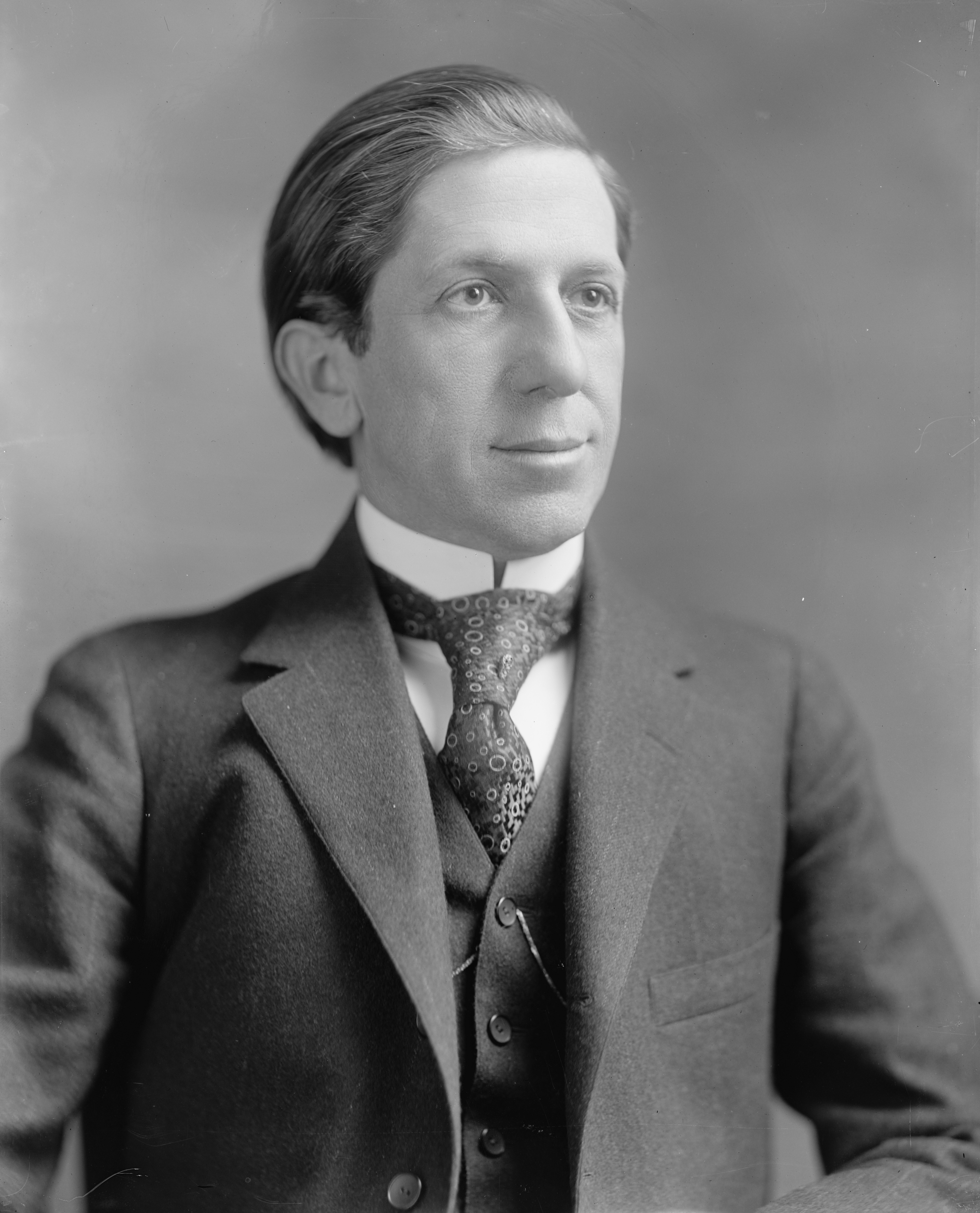

United States Senator from North Carolina
- In office January 3, 1945 – May 12, 1954
- Preceded by: Robert R. Reynolds
- Succeeded by: Sam Ervin

59th Governor of North Carolina
- In office January 7, 1937 – January 9, 1941
- Lieutenant: Wilkins P. Horton
- Preceded by: John C.B. Ehringhaus
- Succeeded by: J. Melville Broughton

Member of the U.S. House of Representatives from North Carolina's 9th district
- In office December 16, 1919 – March 3, 1921
- Preceded by: Edwin Y. Webb
- Succeeded by: Alfred L. Bulwinkle

Member of the North Carolina State Senate
- In office 1902-1904

Member of the North Carolina House of Representatives
- In office 1898-1902

Personal details
- Born: December 11, 1877 Shelby, North Carolina, U.S.
- Died: May 12, 1954 (aged 76) Washington, D.C., U.S.
- Party: Democratic
- Spouse: Margaret Gardner Hoey

Clyde Roark Hoey (December 11, 1877 – May 12, 1954) was an American Democratic politician from North Carolina. He served in both houses of the state legislature and served briefly in the U.S. House of Representatives from 1919 to 1921. He was North Carolina's governor from 1937 to 1941. He entered the U.S. Senate in 1945 and served there until his death in 1954, only days before the Brown v. Board of Education decision. He was a segregationist.

== Biography ==
Hoey (HOO-ee) was born to Captain Samuel Alberta Hoey, a Confederate States Army officer, and Mary Charlotte Roark. He attended school until age eleven. He worked on his family's farm and bought a weekly newspaper when he was 16. He was elected to the state legislature when he was twenty. He served as a state representative and then as a state senator. He was elected in a special election to the United States House of Representatives to fill the vacancy caused by the resignation of Edwin Y. Webb who had accepted a federal judgeship. He defeated a Republican who opposed United States support for the League of Nations. He served from 1919 to 1921. He prosecuted the leaders of the 1929 Loray Mill strike for the murder of the Gastonia police chief.

He was the 59th governor of the U.S. state of North Carolina from 1937 to 1941. In his inaugural address as governor, Hoey delivered what one historian described as “an extended ode to the New Deal.” During his time as governor, Hoey advocated progressive measures such as the provision of free school textbooks and new labor legislation.

In July 1937, he pardoned Luke Lea, a Tennessee politician and former U.S. senator, who had been paroled a year earlier. His appointment of a black man to the board of trustees of a black college set a precedent. Following the 1938 Gaines Supreme Court decision on racial segregation in higher education, he asked the North Carolina legislature to provide for segregated higher education for blacks. Though opposed to integrated education, he said that the people of the state "do believe in equality of opportunity in their respective fields of service" and that "the white race cannot afford to do less than simple justice to the Negro." Nevertheless, during a speech to the United Daughters of the Confederacy, an organization that his wife was a member of, he affirmed his support for segregation.

"Niggers are not entitled to civil rights and will never get them. There were no niggers on the Mayflower."

In 1940, Hoey quietly opposed a third term for FDR. When he believed that President Franklin D. Roosevelt would not seek a third term, Hoey rejected the favorite son role for which the state legislature had recommended him and supported the presidential candidacy of Secretary of State Cordell Hull.

Hoey won election to the U.S. Senate in 1944. He served from 1945 until his death in 1954.

Hoey's politics were arguably those of a conservative Democrat. He opposed Harry S. Truman's attempt to make the Fair Employment Practices Commission (FEPC) permanent. He promised to filibuster the effort as an attack on "the rights of every businessman in America." He supported the President's threats against striking railroad workers in December 1946. In the 1948 election, he supported Truman over the alternative, Strom Thurmond.

He supported President Truman's refusal to allow Congress access to records of government employees' loyalty investigations.

In 1950, Hoey opposed statehood for Hawaii because he thought it "inconceivable" to allow a territory with "only a small percentage of white people" to become a state. He advocated independence for Hawaii and cited U.S. treatment of Cuba and the Philippines as precedents.

From 1949 to 1952 he headed the Investigations Subcommittee of the Committee on Expenditures in Executive Departments. He conducted hearings into the role of "five percenters", government influence peddlers. In 1950 he chaired an investigation that resulted in a report, known as the Hoey Report, released in December of that year that said all of the government's intelligence agencies "are in complete agreement that sex perverts [meaning, primarily, gay men] in Government constitute security risks." Douglas Charles characterizes Hoey's involvement in the committee as reluctant, due to fears that the issue could become hyperbolic, leaving chief counsel Francis Flanagan as the actual driving force behind the Hoey Report. The 1957 Crittenden Report, a review by the U.S. Navy, criticized it: "No intelligence agency, as far as can be learned, adduced any factual data before that committee with which to support these opinions."

Hoey married Bessie Gardner, sister of North Carolina Governor O. Max Gardner. They had three children. His wife died in 1942. He was a lifelong member of the Methodist Episcopal Church, South and taught Sunday school classes. He was also a member of the Freemasons, Odd Fellows, Woodmen of the World, and the Knights of Pythias.

Hoey died at his desk in his Washington, D.C., office. Sam Ervin was appointed to his seat in June 1954.

== Legacy ==
In 1974, journalist Jonathan Daniels assessed Hoey's politics as "always satisfactory to conservative interests without being abrasive to New Dealers."

Three university buildings in North Carolina were named for Hoey, but have been renamed. The first renaming was in July 2019, when, given Hoey's history of segregationist advocacy and use of racist language in a public address, his name was removed from North Carolina Central University's administration building and replaced with that of the university's African-American founder, James E. Shepard. Hoey Hall, a dormitory at Appalachian State University, and Hoey Auditorium, on the campus of Western Carolina University, were renamed in June 2020, as part of the name changes due to the George Floyd protests. According to a unanimous vote of the trustees of Western Carolina, "Hoey's espoused racist views are contrary to this university's core values of diversity and equality."

In popular culture, Hoey is a character in the play CONVENTION written by Danny Rocco and portrayed by Austyn Elliott. Hoey's animate racist and segregationist views along with others in the south who held the same opinions at the time are shown and examined through the lens of the Democratic convention of 1944.

== See also ==
- List of members of the United States Congress who died in office (1950–1999)

Party political offices
Preceded by John C. B. Ehringhaus	Democratic nominee for Governor of North Carolina; 1936	Succeeded by J. Melville Broughton
Preceded by Robert Rice Reynolds	Democratic nominee for U.S. Senator from North Carolina (Class 3); 1944, 1950	Succeeded by Sam Ervin
U.S. House of Representatives
Preceded by Edwin Y. Webb	Member of the U.S. House of Representatives from North Carolina's 9th congressional district 1919–1921	Succeeded by Alfred L. Bulwinkle
Political offices
Preceded by John C.B. Ehringhaus	Governor of North Carolina; 1937–1941	Succeeded by J. Melville Broughton
U.S. Senate
Preceded by Robert Rice Reynolds	U.S. senator (Class 3) from North Carolina; 1945–1954; Served alongside: Josiah W. Bailey, William B. Umstead, Joseph M. Broughton, Frank P. Graham, Willis Smith, Alton Asa Lennon	Succeeded by Sam Ervin
