= National Register of Historic Places listings in Union County, North Carolina =

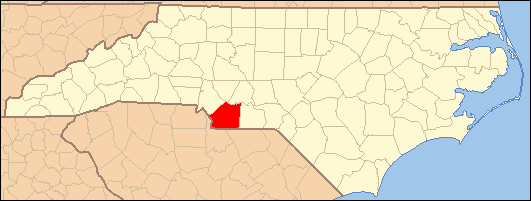

This list includes properties and districts listed on the National Register of Historic Places in Union County, North Carolina. Click the "Map of all coordinates" link to the right to view a Google map of all properties and districts with latitude and longitude coordinates in the table below.

== Current listings ==
This National Park Service list is complete through NPS recent listings posted March 14, 2025.

	Name on the Register	Image	Date listed	Location	City or town	Description
1	Malcolm K. Lee House	Malcolm K. Lee House	January 5, 1988 (#87002200)	Main Street; 34°58′39″N 80°32′03″W	Monroe	Currently operating as a funeral home
2	Monroe City Hall	Monroe City Hall	July 27, 1971 (#71000619)	102 W. Jefferson St. 34°59′01″N 80°32′59″W	Monroe	
3	Monroe Downtown Historic District	Monroe Downtown Historic District	January 6, 1988 (#87002202)	Roughly bounded by Jefferson, Church, Windsor & Stewart Sts. 34°58′55″N 80°33′00″W	Monroe	
4	Monroe Residential Historic District	Monroe Residential Historic District	January 6, 1988 (#87002204)	Roughly bounded by Hough, Franklin, Jefferson, McCarten, Windsor, Sanford, Washington. Braden, Church & Hudson Sts. 34°58′45″N 80°33′01″W	Monroe	
5	Piedmont Buggy Factory	Piedmont Buggy Factory	June 2, 2004 (#04000569)	514 Miller St. 34°59′20″N 80°32′46″W	Monroe	
6	Pleasant Grove Camp Meeting Ground	Pleasant Grove Camp Meeting Ground	April 3, 1973 (#73001370)	NE of Waxhaw on SR 1327; 34°57′18″N 80°41′02″W	Waxhaw	
7	John C. Sikes House	John C. Sikes House	April 15, 1982 (#82003518)	1301 E. Franklin St. 34°58′31″N 80°31′37″W	Monroe	
8	Union County Courthouse	Union County Courthouse	June 24, 1971 (#71000620)	Courthouse Sq. 34°58′59″N 80°33′00″W	Monroe	
9	US Post Office-Monroe	US Post Office-Monroe	March 6, 1985 (#85000482)	407 N. Main St. 34°59′01″N 80°33′03″W	Monroe	
10	Waxhaw Historic District	Waxhaw Historic District	December 6, 1991 (#91001773)	Portions of Main, Broad, Church, Broom, Providence, Old Providence, Brevard and McKibben Sts. 34°55′25″N 80°44′39″W	Waxhaw	
11	Waxhaw-Weddington Roads Historic District	Waxhaw-Weddington Roads Historic District	January 5, 1988 (#87002201)	Jct. of NC 75, NC 34 & W. Franklin St. 34°58′58″N 80°34′19″W	Monroe	
12	Wingate Commercial Historic District	Wingate Commercial Historic District	December 1, 2014 (#14000992)	203, 205, 207-209, 211 Main St. 34°59′02″N 80°26′57″W	Wingate	

== See also ==
- National Register of Historic Places listings in North Carolina
- List of National Historic Landmarks in North Carolina
