= Monroe Historic District =

Monroe Historic District may refer to:

- Monroe Center Historic District, Monroe, Connecticut
- Monroe Commercial Historic District, Monroe, Georgia
- Monroe and Walton Mills Historic District, Monroe, Georgia
- Monroe Residential Historic District (Monroe, Louisiana), listed on the NRHP in Ouachita Parish
- Village of Monroe Historic District, Monroe, New York, also known as the Smith's Mill Historic District
- Monroe Downtown Historic District, Monroe, Union County, North Carolina
- Monroe Residential Historic District (Monroe, North Carolina), Monroe, Union County, North Carolina
- Monroe Courts Historic District, Arlington County, Virginia

== See also ==
- Monroe Center (disambiguation)
- Monroe Residential Historic District (disambiguation)
- Jackson–Monroe Terraces Historic District, Gary, Indiana
- Monroe Terrace Historic District, Gary, Indiana
- South Monroe Street Historic District, Coldwater, Michigan
- Monroe Avenue Commercial Buildings, Detroit, Michigan
- Monroe Street East Historic District, Wheeling, Ohio County, West Virginia
