= 1932 United States presidential election in North Carolina =

- November 8, 1932

All 13 North Carolina votes to the Electoral College

| Nominee | Franklin D. Roosevelt | Herbert Hoover |
| Party | Democratic | Republican |
| Home state | New York | California |
| Running mate | John Nance Garner | Charles Curtis |
| Electoral vote | 13 | 0 |
| Popular vote | 497,566 | 208,344 |
| Percentage | 69.93% | 29.28% |
County results
Roosevelt
50–60%
60–70%
70–80%
80–90%
90–100%
Hoover
50–60%
60–70%
70–80%
President before election
Herbert Hoover
Republican
Elected President
Franklin D. Roosevelt
Democratic

The 1932 United States presidential election in North Carolina took place on November 8, 1932, as part of the 1932 United States presidential election. North Carolina voters chose thirteen representatives, or electors, to the Electoral College, who voted for president and vice president.

As a former Confederate state, North Carolina had a history of Jim Crow laws, disfranchisement of its African-American population and dominance of the Democratic Party in state politics. However, unlike the Deep South, the Republican Party had sufficient historic Unionist White support from the mountains and northwestern Piedmont to gain a stable one-third of the statewide vote total in most general elections, where turnout was higher than elsewhere in the former Confederacy due substantially to the state's early abolition of the poll tax in 1920. A rapid move following disenfranchisement to a completely “lily-white” state GOP also helped maintain Republican support amongst the state's voters. Like Virginia, Tennessee and Oklahoma, the relative strength of Republican opposition meant that North Carolina did not have statewide white primaries, although certain counties did use the white primary.

However, anti-Catholicism against 1928 Democratic nominee Al Smith in the fishing communities of the Outer Banks, alongside increasing middle-class Republican voting in such cities as Charlotte, Durham and Greensboro, meant that Republican nominee Herbert Hoover would use the lily-white state party to win its electoral votes for the first time since the Reconstruction election of 1872. During Hoover's administration, North Carolina was the scene of a major controversy in the Supreme Court nomination of Fourth Circuit judge and 1920 Republican gubernatorial candidate John Johnston Parker. During that election, Parker had said that black North Carolinians no longer desire to participate in politics, and when he was nominated the National Association for the Advancement of Colored People sent letters to senators requesting Parker's defeat. The NAACP would ultimately succeed in defeating Parker, being helped by many Southern Democrats who feared that his nomination would strengthen a newly lily-white Republican Party in the South, by many Northern and Border State Republicans opposed to a lily-white GOP in the former Confederacy, and by the hostility of the American Federation of Labor to some of his rulings. The Parker defeat put an end to Republican efforts to breach the “Solid South” for over two decades, and in North Carolina the two Republican Congressmen elected in 1928 would both be defeated in 1930.

Although North Carolina suffered the smallest relative income loss of any state as a result of the Depression, many Southerners blamed the collapse on the North and on Wall Street. it had extremely severe effects in the South, which had the highest unemployment rate in the nation, and many Southerners blamed this on the North and on Wall Street, rejecting Hoover's claim that the Depression's causes were exogenous.

Neither Hoover nor Democratic nominees Governor Franklin D. Roosevelt and Speaker John Nance Garner campaigned in North Carolina, which was universally expected to return to the “Solid South” with economic conditions as bad as they were. Early polls in October would entirely omit the state, even those including Confederate states that had actually remained loyal to Al Smith. The only poll taken in the state was taken very late in the campaign and had Roosevelt leading by three-to-one.

North Carolina was won by Roosevelt with 69.93 percent of the popular vote, against Hoover and Vice President Charles Curtis, with 29.28 percent of the popular vote. Roosevelt won all but six loyally Unionist counties; although as in 1928 rock-ribbed Republican Avery County in the northwestern Blue Ridge Mountains was Hoover's tenth-best in the country.

== Results ==
1932 United States presidential election in North Carolina
| Party | Candidate | Votes | % |
|---|---|---|---|
| Democratic | Franklin D. Roosevelt | 497,566 | 69.93% |
| Republican | Herbert Hoover (incumbent) | 208,344 | 29.28% |
| Socialist | Norman Thomas | 5,591 | 0.79% |
| Total votes | | 711,501 | 100% |

=== Results by county ===
| County | Franklin D. Roosevelt Democratic | | Herbert Hoover Republican | | Norman Thomas Socialist | | Margin | |
| County | % | # | % | # | % | # | % | # |
|---|---|---|---|---|---|---|---|---|
| Bertie | 97.83% | 3,154 | 2.02% | 65 | 0.16% | 5 | 95.81% | 3,089 |
| Martin | 97.37% | 3,781 | 2.42% | 94 | 0.21% | 8 | 94.95% | 3,687 |
| Pitt | 96.55% | 7,724 | 3.19% | 255 | 0.26% | 21 | 93.36% | 7,469 |
| Hoke | 96.22% | 1,780 | 3.51% | 65 | 0.27% | 5 | 92.70% | 1,715 |
| Greene | 96.28% | 2,510 | 3.61% | 94 | 0.12% | 3 | 92.67% | 2,416 |
| Currituck | 96.02% | 1,759 | 3.77% | 69 | 0.22% | 4 | 92.25% | 1,690 |
| Chowan | 95.96% | 1,639 | 3.75% | 64 | 0.29% | 5 | 92.21% | 1,575 |
| Warren | 95.82% | 2,661 | 3.96% | 110 | 0.22% | 6 | 91.86% | 2,551 |
| Edgecombe | 95.62% | 5,872 | 4.04% | 248 | 0.34% | 21 | 91.58% | 5,624 |
| Northampton | 95.47% | 3,243 | 4.33% | 147 | 0.21% | 7 | 91.14% | 3,096 |
| Franklin | 95.34% | 4,294 | 4.42% | 199 | 0.24% | 11 | 90.92% | 4,095 |
| Hertford | 95.08% | 1,835 | 4.56% | 88 | 0.36% | 7 | 90.52% | 1,747 |
| Halifax | 94.98% | 6,413 | 4.53% | 306 | 0.49% | 33 | 90.45% | 6,107 |
| Anson | 94.91% | 4,252 | 4.98% | 223 | 0.11% | 5 | 89.93% | 4,029 |
| Granville | 94.51% | 3,808 | 5.26% | 212 | 0.22% | 9 | 89.25% | 3,596 |
| Nash | 92.79% | 7,472 | 6.61% | 532 | 0.61% | 49 | 86.18% | 6,940 |
| Gates | 93.01% | 1,198 | 6.91% | 89 | 0.08% | 1 | 86.10% | 1,109 |
| Lenoir | 92.60% | 4,677 | 6.93% | 350 | 0.48% | 24 | 85.67% | 4,327 |
| Scotland | 92.42% | 2,608 | 7.37% | 208 | 0.21% | 6 | 85.05% | 2,400 |
| Vance | 92.03% | 3,833 | 7.64% | 318 | 0.34% | 14 | 84.39% | 3,515 |
| Camden | 92.05% | 915 | 7.85% | 78 | 0.10% | 1 | 84.21% | 837 |
| Wilson | 91.55% | 6,153 | 7.69% | 517 | 0.76% | 51 | 83.86% | 5,636 |
| Jones | 91.42% | 1,449 | 8.33% | 132 | 0.25% | 4 | 83.09% | 1,317 |
| Caswell | 91.39% | 1,858 | 8.31% | 169 | 0.30% | 6 | 83.08% | 1,689 |
| Onslow | 90.89% | 2,615 | 8.79% | 253 | 0.31% | 9 | 82.10% | 2,362 |
| Robeson | 90.48% | 7,860 | 9.01% | 783 | 0.51% | 44 | 81.47% | 7,077 |
| Craven | 90.02% | 4,375 | 9.59% | 466 | 0.39% | 19 | 80.43% | 3,909 |
| Pasquotank | 89.49% | 2,946 | 9.96% | 328 | 0.55% | 18 | 79.53% | 2,618 |
| Union | 88.84% | 6,103 | 10.33% | 710 | 0.83% | 57 | 78.50% | 5,393 |
| Pender | 87.64% | 1,993 | 11.87% | 270 | 0.48% | 11 | 75.77% | 1,723 |
| Hyde | 87.43% | 1,050 | 12.24% | 147 | 0.33% | 4 | 75.19% | 903 |
| Richmond | 86.96% | 4,862 | 12.39% | 693 | 0.64% | 36 | 74.57% | 4,169 |
| Columbus | 86.55% | 5,098 | 12.55% | 739 | 0.90% | 53 | 74.01% | 4,359 |
| Wake | 86.02% | 14,863 | 12.56% | 2,170 | 1.42% | 246 | 73.46% | 12,693 |
| Beaufort | 86.33% | 5,552 | 13.05% | 839 | 0.62% | 40 | 73.29% | 4,713 |
| Perquimans | 84.94% | 1,280 | 14.93% | 225 | 0.13% | 2 | 70.01% | 1,055 |
| Cumberland | 83.77% | 5,012 | 15.56% | 931 | 0.67% | 40 | 68.21% | 4,081 |
| Lee | 81.50% | 3,058 | 18.15% | 681 | 0.35% | 13 | 63.35% | 2,377 |
| Cleveland | 80.60% | 8,016 | 19.15% | 1,904 | 0.25% | 25 | 61.46% | 6,112 |
| New Hanover | 79.33% | 6,030 | 18.81% | 1,430 | 1.86% | 141 | 60.52% | 4,600 |
| Duplin | 79.46% | 4,674 | 19.94% | 1,173 | 0.60% | 35 | 59.52% | 3,501 |
| Wayne | 79.01% | 6,365 | 20.25% | 1,631 | 0.74% | 60 | 58.76% | 4,734 |
| Mecklenburg | 77.90% | 18,167 | 21.32% | 4,973 | 0.78% | 181 | 56.58% | 13,194 |
| Person | 77.80% | 2,372 | 21.65% | 660 | 0.56% | 17 | 56.15% | 1,712 |
| Tyrrell | 76.78% | 873 | 22.69% | 258 | 0.53% | 6 | 54.09% | 615 |
| Bladen | 75.85% | 2,651 | 23.12% | 808 | 1.03% | 36 | 52.73% | 1,843 |
| Washington | 72.71% | 1,681 | 26.77% | 619 | 0.52% | 12 | 45.93% | 1,062 |
| Rockingham | 72.37% | 7,795 | 26.89% | 2,896 | 0.74% | 80 | 45.48% | 4,899 |
| Durham | 70.78% | 7,559 | 25.94% | 2,770 | 3.29% | 351 | 44.84% | 4,789 |
| Orange | 69.57% | 2,924 | 26.50% | 1,114 | 3.93% | 165 | 43.06% | 1,810 |
| Dare | 71.16% | 1,241 | 28.50% | 497 | 0.34% | 6 | 42.66% | 744 |
| Gaston | 70.78% | 12,890 | 28.36% | 5,164 | 0.86% | 157 | 42.42% | 7,726 |
| Johnston | 70.86% | 9,574 | 28.77% | 3,887 | 0.37% | 50 | 42.09% | 5,687 |
| Cabarrus | 70.68% | 8,465 | 28.76% | 3,444 | 0.57% | 68 | 41.92% | 5,021 |
| Harnett | 70.42% | 6,346 | 29.04% | 2,617 | 0.54% | 49 | 41.38% | 3,729 |
| Forsyth | 69.73% | 14,016 | 28.49% | 5,727 | 1.78% | 357 | 41.24% | 8,289 |
| Alleghany | 70.28% | 1,951 | 29.18% | 810 | 0.54% | 15 | 41.10% | 1,141 |
| Iredell | 69.70% | 8,367 | 29.85% | 3,583 | 0.46% | 55 | 39.85% | 4,784 |
| Pamlico | 67.34% | 1,526 | 29.35% | 665 | 3.31% | 75 | 38.00% | 861 |
| Haywood | 68.54% | 6,790 | 31.11% | 3,082 | 0.34% | 34 | 37.43% | 3,708 |
| Rowan | 67.81% | 9,782 | 30.94% | 4,464 | 1.25% | 180 | 36.86% | 5,318 |
| Buncombe | 66.69% | 18,241 | 31.97% | 8,745 | 1.34% | 367 | 34.72% | 9,496 |
| Guilford | 66.42% | 19,301 | 31.88% | 9,263 | 1.70% | 495 | 34.54% | 10,038 |
| Carteret | 65.50% | 3,455 | 33.46% | 1,765 | 1.04% | 55 | 32.04% | 1,690 |
| McDowell | 65.68% | 4,810 | 33.84% | 2,478 | 0.48% | 35 | 31.84% | 2,332 |
| Rutherford | 64.93% | 8,336 | 34.65% | 4,448 | 0.42% | 54 | 30.29% | 3,888 |
| Alamance | 63.97% | 8,240 | 34.76% | 4,478 | 1.27% | 164 | 29.20% | 3,762 |
| Moore | 63.11% | 4,287 | 36.20% | 2,459 | 0.69% | 47 | 26.91% | 1,828 |
| Polk | 62.48% | 2,401 | 36.98% | 1,421 | 0.55% | 21 | 25.50% | 980 |
| Surry | 62.05% | 7,490 | 37.37% | 4,511 | 0.57% | 69 | 24.68% | 2,979 |
| Chatham | 61.68% | 4,263 | 37.47% | 2,590 | 0.85% | 59 | 24.20% | 1,673 |
| Jackson | 60.49% | 4,360 | 39.03% | 2,813 | 0.49% | 35 | 21.46% | 1,547 |
| Davidson | 59.95% | 9,292 | 39.04% | 6,051 | 1.01% | 157 | 20.91% | 3,241 |
| Alexander | 59.86% | 2,953 | 39.57% | 1,952 | 0.57% | 28 | 20.29% | 1,001 |
| Transylvania | 59.84% | 2,523 | 39.63% | 1,671 | 0.52% | 22 | 20.21% | 852 |
| Caldwell | 59.07% | 5,479 | 40.43% | 3,750 | 0.50% | 46 | 18.64% | 1,729 |
| Catawba | 58.90% | 8,446 | 40.56% | 5,817 | 0.54% | 77 | 18.33% | 2,629 |
| Stanly | 58.87% | 5,785 | 40.63% | 3,992 | 0.50% | 49 | 18.25% | 1,793 |
| Stokes | 58.76% | 3,721 | 40.69% | 2,577 | 0.55% | 35 | 18.06% | 1,144 |
| Yancey | 58.66% | 3,412 | 41.19% | 2,396 | 0.15% | 9 | 17.47% | 1,016 |
| Macon | 57.97% | 3,223 | 41.49% | 2,307 | 0.54% | 30 | 16.47% | 916 |
| Montgomery | 57.41% | 2,927 | 42.23% | 2,153 | 0.35% | 18 | 15.18% | 774 |
| Swain | 55.78% | 2,412 | 43.78% | 1,893 | 0.44% | 19 | 12.00% | 519 |
| Henderson | 55.37% | 5,255 | 43.96% | 4,172 | 0.66% | 63 | 11.41% | 1,083 |
| Brunswick | 55.30% | 2,245 | 44.29% | 1,798 | 0.42% | 17 | 11.01% | 447 |
| Lincoln | 55.02% | 4,399 | 44.56% | 3,563 | 0.43% | 34 | 10.46% | 836 |
| Ashe | 54.86% | 4,751 | 44.70% | 3,871 | 0.44% | 38 | 10.16% | 880 |
| Burke | 54.64% | 5,866 | 44.92% | 4,823 | 0.44% | 47 | 9.71% | 1,043 |
| Randolph | 54.44% | 7,345 | 45.00% | 6,072 | 0.56% | 75 | 9.44% | 1,273 |
| Sampson | 53.66% | 4,911 | 45.09% | 4,127 | 1.25% | 114 | 8.57% | 784 |
| Graham | 53.32% | 1,364 | 46.25% | 1,183 | 0.43% | 11 | 7.08% | 181 |
| Watauga | 51.76% | 3,419 | 47.93% | 3,166 | 0.32% | 21 | 3.83% | 253 |
| Cherokee | 51.48% | 3,348 | 48.14% | 3,131 | 0.38% | 25 | 3.34% | 217 |
| Clay | 51.30% | 1,341 | 48.39% | 1,265 | 0.31% | 8 | 2.91% | 76 |
| Davie | 48.64% | 2,381 | 50.52% | 2,473 | 0.84% | 41 | -1.88% | -92 |
| Wilkes | 46.04% | 5,598 | 53.64% | 6,522 | 0.32% | 39 | -7.60% | -924 |
| Yadkin | 44.68% | 2,789 | 54.82% | 3,422 | 0.50% | 31 | -10.14% | -633 |
| Madison | 37.57% | 2,769 | 61.76% | 4,552 | 0.66% | 49 | -24.19% | -1,783 |
| Mitchell | 31.77% | 1,773 | 68.06% | 3,798 | 0.16% | 9 | -36.29% | -2,025 |
| Avery | 26.79% | 1,045 | 72.64% | 2,833 | 0.56% | 22 | -45.85% | -1,788 |

==== Counties that flipped from Republican to Democratic ====
- Tyrrell
- Haywood
- Cumberland
- Yancey
- Alamance
- Ashe
- Alexander
- Brunswick
- Burke
- Buncombe
- Bladen
- Chatham
- Columbus
- Clay
- Caldwell
- Cherokee
- Catabwa
- Carteret
- Cabarrus
- Davidson
- Durham
- Duplin
- Forsyth
- Guilford
- Henderson
- Harnett
- Macon
- Gaston
- Graham
- Iredell
- Hyde
- Jackson
- Jones
- Johnston
- Lincoln
- Montgomery
- Moore
- Mecklenburg
- New Hanover
- Pender
- Pamlico
- Polk
- Randolph
- Rowan
- Rockingham
- Rutherford
- Orange
- Swain
- Sampson
- Surry
- Stanly
- Stokes
- Transylvania
- Washington
- Watauga
- Onslow
- Wayne
