= 1936 United States presidential election in North Carolina =

- November 3, 1936

All 13 North Carolina votes to the Electoral College

Nominee	Franklin D. Roosevelt	Alf Landon
Party	Democratic	Republican
Home state	New York	Kansas
Running mate	John Nance Garner	Frank Knox
Electoral vote	13	0
Popular vote	616,141	223,283
Percentage	73.40%	26.60%
County results
Roosevelt
50–60%
60–70%
70–80%
80–90%
90–100%
Landon
50–60%
60–70%
70–80%
President before election
Franklin D. Roosevelt
Democratic
Elected President
Franklin D. Roosevelt
Democratic

The 1936 United States presidential election in North Carolina took place on November 3, 1936, as part of the 1936 United States presidential election. North Carolina voters chose 13 representatives, or electors, to the Electoral College, who voted for president and vice president.

As a former Confederate state, North Carolina had a history of Jim Crow laws, disfranchisement of its African-American population and dominance of the Democratic Party in state politics. However, unlike the Deep South, the Republican Party had sufficient historic Unionist White support from the mountains and northwestern Piedmont to gain a stable one-third of the statewide vote total in most general elections, where turnout was higher than elsewhere in the former Confederacy due substantially to the state's early abolition of the poll tax in 1920. A rapid move following disenfranchisement to a completely “lily-white” state GOP also helped maintain Republican support amongst the state's voters. Like Virginia, Tennessee and Oklahoma, the relative strength of Republican opposition meant that North Carolina did not have statewide white primaries, although certain counties did use the white primary.

Anti-Catholicism against 1928 Democratic nominee Al Smith in the fishing communities of the Outer Banks, alongside increasing middle-class Republican voting in such cities as Charlotte, Durham and Greensboro, meant that Republican nominee Herbert Hoover would use the lily-white state party to win its electoral votes for the first time since the Reconstruction election of 1872. During Hoover's administration, the state became the scene of a major controversy in the Supreme Court nomination of Fourth Circuit judge and 1920 Republican gubernatorial candidate John Johnston Parker, who had said that black North Carolinians no longer desire to participate in politics. When he was nominated the National Association for the Advancement of Colored People sent letters to senators requesting Parker's defeat. The NAACP would ultimately succeed in defeating Parker, being helped by many Southern Democrats who feared that his nomination would strengthen a newly lily-white Republican Party in the former Confederacy, by many Northern and Border State Republicans opposed to a lily-white GOP there, and by the hostility of the American Federation of Labor to some of his rulings. The Parker defeat put an end to Republican efforts to breach the “Solid South” for over two decades, and in North Carolina the two Republican congressmen elected in 1928 would both be defeated in 1930.

Although North Carolina suffered the smallest relative income loss of any state as a result of the Depression, many Southerners blamed the collapse on the North and on Wall Street. it had extremely severe effects in the South, which had the highest unemployment rate in the nation, and many Southerners blamed this on the North and on Wall Street, rejecting Hoover's claim that the Depression's causes were exogenous. As expected, North Carolina returned to the “Solid South” in 1932, and despite the entrenched conservatism of its Democratic leadership, the majority of the state's electorate revered President Franklin D. Roosevelt. In October 1936, a poll had Roosevelt winning 65 percent of the state's ballots against Republican nominees Kansas Governor Alf Landon and Frank Knox. Another poll a week before the election said the state was sure to back FDR despite known doubts about the New Deal amongst voters.

Ultimately North Carolina was won by Roosevelt with 73.40 percent of the popular vote, against Landon's 26.60 percent. This was an improvement of over three points upon FDR's 1932 performance, produced by gains of double digits in the urban Piedmont counties of Durham and Alamance, and lesser gains in neighbouring counties. Landon retained the loyal GOP Unionist strength, with Avery County advancing from the tenth-most Republican in 1932 to being Landon's fifth-strongest county four years later.

== Results ==
1936 United States presidential election in North Carolina
Party	Candidate	Votes	%
Democratic	Franklin D. Roosevelt (inc.)	616,141	73.40%
Republican	Alf Landon	223,283	26.60%
Write-in	Norman Thomas	21 (Note: None of these write-in candidates had their votes separated by county; they were given only as a statewide total.)	0.00%
Write-in	Earl Browder	11	0.00%
Write-in	William Lemke	2	0.00%
Write-ins	Various candidates	6	0.00%
Total votes		839,464	100%

=== Results by county ===
1936 United States presidential election in North Carolina by county
County	Franklin Delano Roosevelt Democratic		Alfred Mossman Landon Republican		Margin	
County	%	#	%	#	%	#
Martin	97.58%	4,477	2.42%	111	95.16%	4,366
Northampton	97.20%	3,785	2.80%	109	94.40%	3,676
Bertie	97.08%	3,828	2.92%	115	94.17%	3,713
Pitt	96.71%	9,539	3.29%	325	93.41%	9,214
Hertford	96.52%	2,327	3.48%	84	93.03%	2,243
Halifax	96.39%	8,230	3.61%	308	92.79%	7,922
Greene	96.39%	3,097	3.61%	116	92.78%	2,981
Edgecombe	96.17%	6,684	3.83%	266	92.35%	6,418
Granville	95.86%	4,279	4.14%	185	91.71%	4,094
Franklin	95.75%	5,209	4.25%	231	91.51%	4,978
Warren	95.61%	3,047	4.39%	140	91.21%	2,907
Nash	94.38%	8,682	5.62%	517	88.76%	8,165
Lenoir	94.34%	5,854	5.66%	351	88.69%	5,503
Chowan	94.17%	1,550	5.83%	96	88.34%	1,454
Vance	93.51%	4,536	6.49%	315	87.01%	4,221
Robeson	93.35%	10,280	6.65%	732	86.71%	9,548
Hoke	93.27%	1,953	6.73%	141	86.53%	1,812
Wilson	93.20%	7,522	6.80%	549	86.40%	6,973
Currituck	92.70%	1,625	7.30%	128	85.40%	1,497
Union	92.56%	7,480	7.44%	601	85.13%	6,879
Craven	92.44%	5,543	7.56%	453	84.89%	5,090
Anson	92.40%	4,629	7.60%	381	84.79%	4,248
Caswell	92.33%	2,493	7.67%	207	84.67%	2,286
Onslow	92.15%	2,758	7.85%	235	84.30%	2,523
Gates	92.06%	1,484	7.94%	128	84.12%	1,356
Richmond	91.70%	6,709	8.30%	607	83.41%	6,102
Scotland	91.02%	3,183	8.98%	314	82.04%	2,869
Pasquotank	90.87%	3,226	9.13%	324	81.75%	2,902
Camden	89.60%	1,008	10.40%	117	79.20%	891
Jones	89.26%	1,563	10.74%	188	78.53%	1,375
Wake	88.99%	19,850	11.01%	2,456	77.98%	17,394
Person	88.30%	2,898	11.70%	384	76.60%	2,514
Pender	87.72%	2,379	12.28%	333	75.44%	2,046
Beaufort	86.42%	6,133	13.58%	964	72.83%	5,169
Cumberland	86.40%	6,505	13.60%	1,024	72.80%	5,481
Bladen	85.91%	3,360	14.09%	551	71.82%	2,809
Perquimans	85.76%	970	14.24%	161	71.53%	809
Durham	85.40%	12,804	14.60%	2,189	70.80%	10,615
New Hanover	84.96%	7,376	15.04%	1,306	69.91%	6,070
Mecklenburg	84.75%	26,169	15.25%	4,709	69.50%	21,460
Lee	84.75%	3,723	15.25%	670	69.50%	3,053
Cleveland	84.34%	11,393	15.66%	2,116	68.67%	9,277
Columbus	83.97%	6,359	16.03%	1,214	67.94%	5,145
Rockingham	81.84%	11,366	18.16%	2,522	63.68%	8,844
Cabarrus	81.32%	12,297	18.68%	2,825	62.64%	9,472
Wayne	80.19%	7,087	19.81%	1,751	60.38%	5,336
Duplin	79.42%	5,966	20.58%	1,546	58.84%	4,420
Hyde	79.30%	1,157	20.70%	302	58.60%	855
Gaston	78.63%	17,555	21.37%	4,772	57.25%	12,783
Forsyth	78.09%	18,734	21.91%	5,256	56.18%	13,478
Harnett	77.98%	8,018	22.02%	2,264	55.96%	5,754
Washington	77.80%	1,875	22.20%	535	55.60%	1,340
Tyrrell	77.53%	1,049	22.47%	304	55.06%	745
Rowan	74.84%	12,808	25.16%	4,306	49.68%	8,502
Iredell	74.76%	11,308	25.24%	3,817	49.53%	7,491
Alamance	74.13%	11,025	25.87%	3,847	48.27%	7,178
Guilford	72.89%	25,579	27.11%	9,514	45.78%	16,065
Orange	72.75%	3,860	27.25%	1,446	45.50%	2,414
Johnston	72.17%	11,253	27.83%	4,339	44.34%	6,914
Dare	71.93%	1,389	28.07%	542	43.86%	847
Buncombe	71.40%	23,646	28.60%	9,470	42.81%	14,176
Haywood	71.05%	8,175	28.95%	3,331	42.10%	4,844
Rutherford	67.23%	9,911	32.77%	4,830	34.47%	5,081
Chatham	66.71%	4,373	33.29%	2,182	33.42%	2,191
Carteret	66.68%	3,780	33.32%	1,889	33.36%	1,891
Caldwell	66.56%	6,809	33.44%	3,421	33.12%	3,388
Pamlico	65.42%	1,627	34.58%	860	30.84%	767
Surry	64.95%	8,833	35.05%	4,766	29.91%	4,067
Moore	64.29%	4,466	35.71%	2,481	28.57%	1,985
Catawba	63.30%	11,017	36.70%	6,387	26.60%	4,630
McDowell	63.22%	5,352	36.78%	3,114	26.44%	2,238
Brunswick	62.51%	2,710	37.49%	1,625	25.03%	1,085
Lincoln	61.17%	5,515	38.83%	3,501	22.34%	2,014
Alleghany	61.02%	2,345	38.98%	1,498	22.04%	847
Jackson	59.94%	4,580	40.06%	3,061	19.88%	1,519
Stanly	58.99%	6,505	41.01%	4,523	17.97%	1,982
Transylvania	58.71%	2,845	41.29%	2,001	17.42%	844
Davidson	58.62%	10,844	41.38%	7,656	17.23%	3,188
Polk	58.42%	2,521	41.58%	1,794	16.85%	727
Montgomery	58.16%	3,484	41.84%	2,506	16.33%	978
Burke	57.52%	7,454	42.48%	5,506	15.03%	1,948
Stokes	57.36%	4,384	42.64%	3,259	14.72%	1,125
Yancey	57.24%	3,603	42.76%	2,691	14.49%	912
Alexander	57.10%	3,262	42.90%	2,451	14.20%	811
Macon	56.45%	3,311	43.55%	2,554	12.91%	757
Swain	55.69%	2,619	44.31%	2,084	11.38%	535
Ashe	54.92%	5,552	45.08%	4,557	9.84%	995
Sampson	54.54%	5,937	45.46%	4,948	9.09%	989
Randolph	53.87%	8,090	46.13%	6,927	7.74%	1,163
Watauga	53.23%	3,880	46.77%	3,409	6.46%	471
Henderson	52.99%	5,747	47.01%	5,099	5.97%	648
Graham	52.64%	1,473	47.36%	1,325	5.29%	148
Cherokee	51.94%	3,473	48.06%	3,214	3.87%	259
Davie	49.74%	2,476	50.26%	2,502	-0.52%	-26
Clay	46.77%	1,340	53.23%	1,525	-6.46%	-185
Wilkes	43.77%	6,506	56.23%	8,358	-12.46%	-1,852
Yadkin	43.31%	3,209	56.69%	4,200	-13.38%	-991
Madison	38.06%	3,133	61.94%	5,099	-23.88%	-1,966
Mitchell	33.29%	1,687	66.71%	3,380	-33.41%	-1,693
Avery	22.02%	839	77.98%	2,971	-55.96%	-2,132

==== Counties that flipped from Democratic to Republican ====
- Clay
