= Monroe Residential Historic District =

Monroe Residential Historic District may refer to:

- Monroe Residential Historic District (Monroe, Louisiana), listed on the National Register of Historic Places in Ouachita Parish, Louisiana
- Monroe Residential Historic District (Monroe, North Carolina), listed on the National Register of Historic Places in Union County

== See also ==
- Monroe Historic District (disambiguation)
