= Terry Witherspoon =

American football player (born 1977)

No. 48
- Position: Fullback

Personal information
- Born: August 22, 1977 (age 49); Monroe, North Carolina, U.S.
- Listed height: 5 ft 11 in (1.80 m)
- Listed weight: 250 lb (113 kg)

Career information
- High school: Monroe
- College: Clemson
- NFL draft: 2001: undrafted

Career history
- San Diego Chargers (2001)*; Dallas Cowboys (2001); San Diego Chargers (2002)*; Cincinnati Bengals (2003)*
- * Offseason or practice squad member only

Career NFL statistics
- Games played: 3
- Receptions: 1
- Receiving yards: 9
- Stats at Pro Football Reference

Terry Witherspoon (born August 22, 1977) is an American former professional football player who was a fullback in the National Football League (NFL) for the Dallas Cowboys. He played college football for the Clemson Tigers.

== Early life ==
Witherspoon attended Monroe High School. He earned all-conference honors in three out of four years while playing five different positions: fullback, tailback, tight end, linebacker and defensive end.

As a senior, he was rated the number six player in the state of North Carolina. He recorded 1,002 rushing yards and 17 touchdowns.

He finished his high school career with 422 carries for 2,780 yards, 39 rushing touchdowns, 117 tackles (73 solo), 12 sacks, one touchdown reception and one touchdown pass.

== College career ==
Witherspoon accepted a football scholarship from Clemson University. As a redshirt freshman, he started four games at fullback. He had 12 carries for 61 yards and one touchdown against Georgia Tech. He had 11 carries for 71 yards against Wake Forest University. He rushed for a touchdown in the 1998 Peach Bowl against Auburn University. He finished the season with 58 carries for 224 yards (third on the team) and 3 touchdowns.

As a sophomore, he became the regular starter at fullback, posting 56 carries for 157 yards and 3 rushing touchdowns (tied for second on the team). As a junior he was named the regular starter at fullback, tallying 18 carries for 46 yards and one rushing touchdown.

As a senior, he was named the regular starter at fullback, collecting 5 carries for 29 yards. He only missed one game in his college career, finishing with 137 carries for 456 yards and 7 touchdowns.

== Professional career ==
Witherspoon was signed as an undrafted free agent by the San Diego Chargers after the 2001 NFL draft. He was waived on September 3. He was signed to the practice squad on September 5. He was released on October 9.

On October 22, 2001, he was signed to the Dallas Cowboys' practice squad. On December 22, he was promoted to the active roster. He played in the last 3 games, blocking for running back Emmitt Smith. He was released on April 22, 2002.

On April 23, 2002, he was claimed off waivers by the San Diego Chargers. He was released on August 25.

On February 5, 2003, he was signed as a free agent by the Cincinnati Bengals. He was released on August 18.
