= Samuel I. Parker =

United States Army Medal of Honor recipient

Samuel Iredell Parker
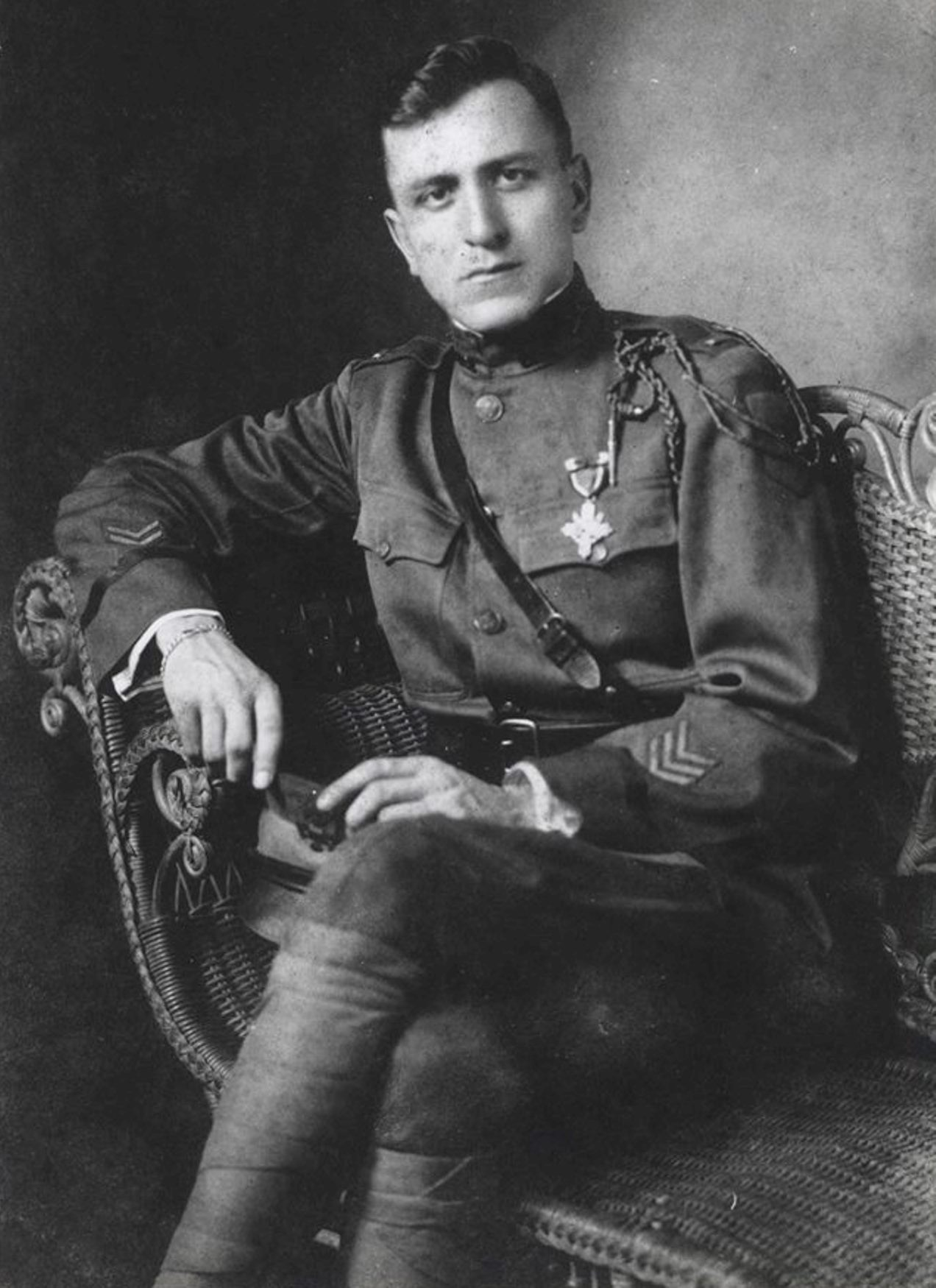
- Second Lieutenant Samuel Iredell Parker
- Born: October 17, 1891; Monroe, North Carolina
- Died: December 1, 1975 (aged 84); Walter Reed Army Medical Center, Washington, D.C.
- Burial place: Oakwood Cemetery, Concord, North Carolina
- Military career
- Allegiance: United States of America
- Branch: United States Army
- Rank: Lieutenant Colonel
- Units: Company K, 28th Infantry Regiment, 1st Infantry Division
- Conflicts: World War I; Battle of Soissons (WIA); Meuse–Argonne offensive; World War II
- Awards: Medal of Honor; Distinguished Service Cross; Silver Star (2); Legion of Merit; Purple Heart (2)

Samuel Iredell Parker (October 17, 1891 – December 1, 1975) was one of the most decorated United States Army soldiers of World War I. A Second Lieutenant and a recipient of the United States military's highest decoration, the Medal of Honor, for his actions in the Battle of Soissons France during World War I. President Franklin D. Roosevelt presented the Medal of Honor to Parker on May 7, 1936, at the White House in a ceremony which U.S. Army Chief of Staff Maj. Gen. Malin H. Craig attended.

Parker's other awards include the Distinguished Service Cross, two awards of the Silver Star, the Legion of Merit, two Purple Hearts, and the Croix de Guerre.

== Personal life ==
Born on October 17, 1891, in Monroe, North Carolina, Parker was one of four children born to Frances Ann (Johnston) and John Daniel Parker. He was a descendent of William Bradford, a founder of Plymouth Colony, in Massachusetts, and of associate justice of the Supreme Court of the United States James Iredell. He was also a brother of United States federal judge John J. Parker.

He was commissioned an Army lieutenant in 1917 and served with the First Infantry Division in France during World War I, during which he earned all three of the nation's highest awards for gallantry in combat.

After the war, Parker worked in textile mills in North Carolina. During World War II, he returned to active duty, rose to the rank of lieutenant colonel and was involved with training soldiers at Fort Benning, Georgia.

He died on December 1, 1975, at Walter Reed Army Medical Center, Washington, D.C., and was buried at Oakwood Cemetery, Concord, North Carolina.

== Medal of Honor ==
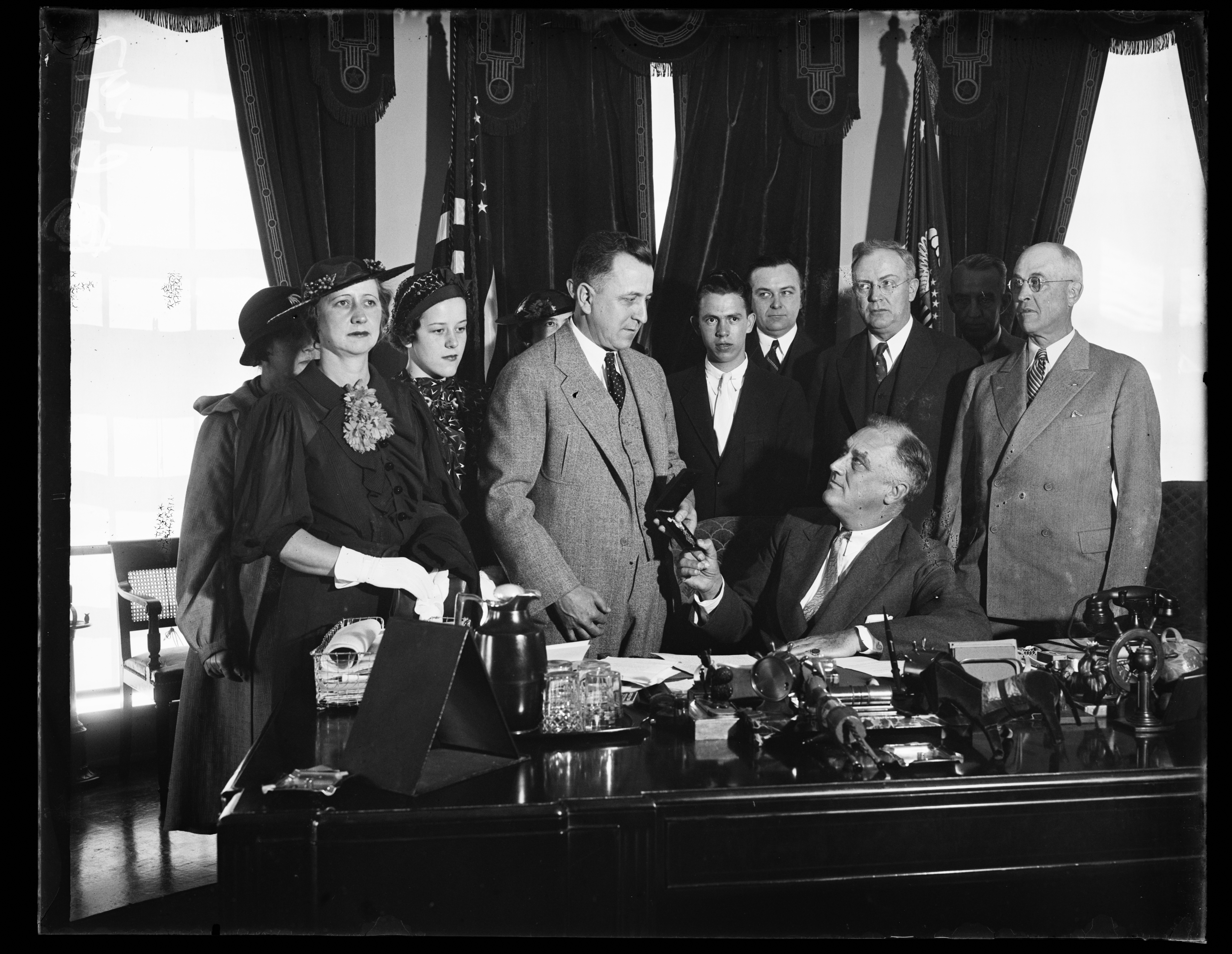
Original caption: President Roosevelt presents Congressional Medal of Honor to Atlantan. Washington, D.C. May 7, 1936. President Roosevelt today presented the Congressional Medal of Honor to Capt. Samuel I. Parker, of the Infantry Reserve, Atlanta, Georgia. The medal was presented for 'extraordinary heroism in action' during the World War. Members of Capt. Parker's family and Maj. Gen Malin H. Craig, U.S. Army Chief of Staff, witnessed the presentation. In the photo L to R: Mrs. Samuel I. Parker, Miss Parker, daughter; Capt. Samuel I. Parker; Sam Parker Jr.; President Roosevelt; Judge Parker, a brother; Rep. Malcom Tarver of Georgia; and Maj. Gen. Malin H. Craig.

Rank and organization: Second Lieutenant, U.S. Army, Company K, 28th Infantry, 1st Division. Place and date: Near Soissons, France, 18–19 July 1918. Entered service at: Monroe, North Carolina. Birth: Monroe, North Carolina. General Orders: War Department, General Orders No. 1 (1937).

Citation:

For conspicuous gallantry and intrepidity above and beyond the call of duty. During the attack the 2d and 3d Battalions of the 28th Infantry were merged, and after several hours of severe fighting, successfully established a frontline position. In so doing, a gap was left between the right flank of the French 153d Division on their left and the left flank of the 28th Infantry, exposing the left flank to a terrific enfilade fire from several enemy machineguns located in a rock quarry on high ground. 2d Lt. Parker, observing this serious situation, ordered his depleted platoon to follow him in an attack upon the strong point. Meeting a disorganized group of French Colonials wandering leaderlessly about, he persuaded them to join his platoon. This consolidated group followed 2d Lt. Parker through direct enemy rifle and machinegun fire to the crest of the hill, and rushing forward, took the quarry by storm, capturing 6 machineguns and about 40 prisoners. The next day when the assault was continued, 2d Lt. Parker in command of the merged 2d and 3d Battalions was in support of the 1st Battalion. Although painfully wounded in the foot, he refused to be evacuated and continued to lead his command until the objective was reached. Seeing that the assault battalion was subjected to heavy enfilade fire due to a gap between it and the French on its left, 2d Lt. Parker led his battalion through this heavy fire up on the line to the left of the 1st Battalion and thereby closed the gap, remaining in command of his battalion until the newly established lines of the 28th Infantry were thoroughly consolidated. In supervising the consolidation of the new position, 2d Lt. Parker was compelled to crawl about on his hands and knees on account of his painful wound. His conspicuous gallantry and spirit of self-sacrifice were a source of great inspiration to the members of the entire command.

== Distinguished Service Cross ==
Rank and organization: Second Lieutenant, U.S. Army, 28th Infantry, 1st Division, American Expeditionary Forces. Place and date: Near Exermont, France; October 5, 1918. General Orders: War Department, General Orders No. 44 (1919).

Citation:

The President of the United States of America, authorized by Act of Congress, July 9, 1918, takes pleasure in presenting the Distinguished Service Cross to Second Lieutenant (Infantry) Samuel Iredell Parker, United States Army, for extraordinary heroism in action while serving with 28th Infantry Regiment, 1st Division, A.E.F., near Exermont, France, 5 October 1918. With total disregard for his own personal danger, Lieutenant Parker advanced directly on a machine-gun 150 yards away while the enemy were firing directly at him, and killed the gunner with his pistol. In the town of Exermont his platoon was almost surrounded after having taken several prisoners and inflicting heavy losses on the enemy; but despite the fact that only a few men of the platoon were left, continued to fight until other troops came to their aid.

== Military Awards ==
Parker's military decorations and awards include the following:

1st row	Medal of Honor	Distinguished Service Cross	Silver Star w/one bronze oak leaf cluster
2nd row	Legion of Merit	Purple Heart w/one bronze oak leaf cluster	World War I Victory Medal w/ five service stars to denote credit for the Montdidier-Noyon, Aisne-Marne, St. Mihiel, Meuse-Argonne and Defensive Sector battle clasps.
3rd row	American Campaign Medal	World War II Victory Medal	Croix de guerre 1914–1918 w/bronze palm (French Republic)
Unit Award	French Fourragère - Authorized permanent wear based on two French Croix de Guerre with Palm unit citations awarded the 28th Infantry Regiment for Picardy and Aisne-Marne		

== See also ==
- List of Medal of Honor recipients
- List of Medal of Honor recipients for World War I

== Bibliography ==
- Willbanks, James H. (2011). America's Heroes: Medal of Honor Recipients from the Civil War to Afghanistan. Santa Barbara, California: ABC-Clio. ISBN 978-1-5988-4394-1.
