= Union County Courthouse (North Carolina) =

Historic courthouse in North Carolina, US

- U.S. National Register of Historic Places
- U.S. Historic district – Contributing property
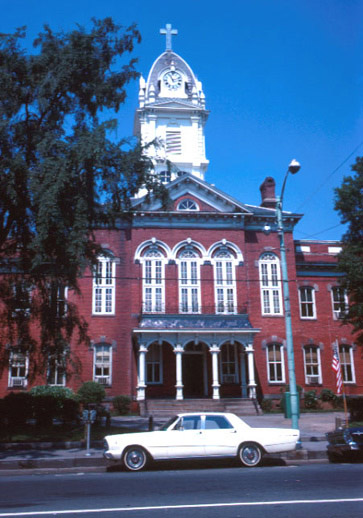
- Union County Courthouse, June 1969

- Location within North Carolina Location within the United States
- Location: Courthouse Sq., Monroe, North Carolina
- Coordinates: 34°58′59″N 80°33′00″W
- Area: 0.5 acres (0.20 ha)
- Built: 1886
- Architect: Hart, J.T.
- Architectural style: Late Victorian
- NRHP reference No.: 71000620
- Added to NRHP: June 24, 1971

Union County Courthouse is a historic courthouse building located at Monroe, Union County, North Carolina. The original Late Victorian section, was built in 1886, consisted of a two-story five-bay main block with a two-bay wing on each side. It has a low hip roof surmounted by a large cupola. Two additional three-bay wings were added in 1922.

It was listed on the National Register of Historic Places in 1971. It is located in the Monroe Downtown Historic District.
