= Monroe City Hall (Monroe, North Carolina) =

Historic building in North Carolina, US

- U.S. National Register of Historic Places
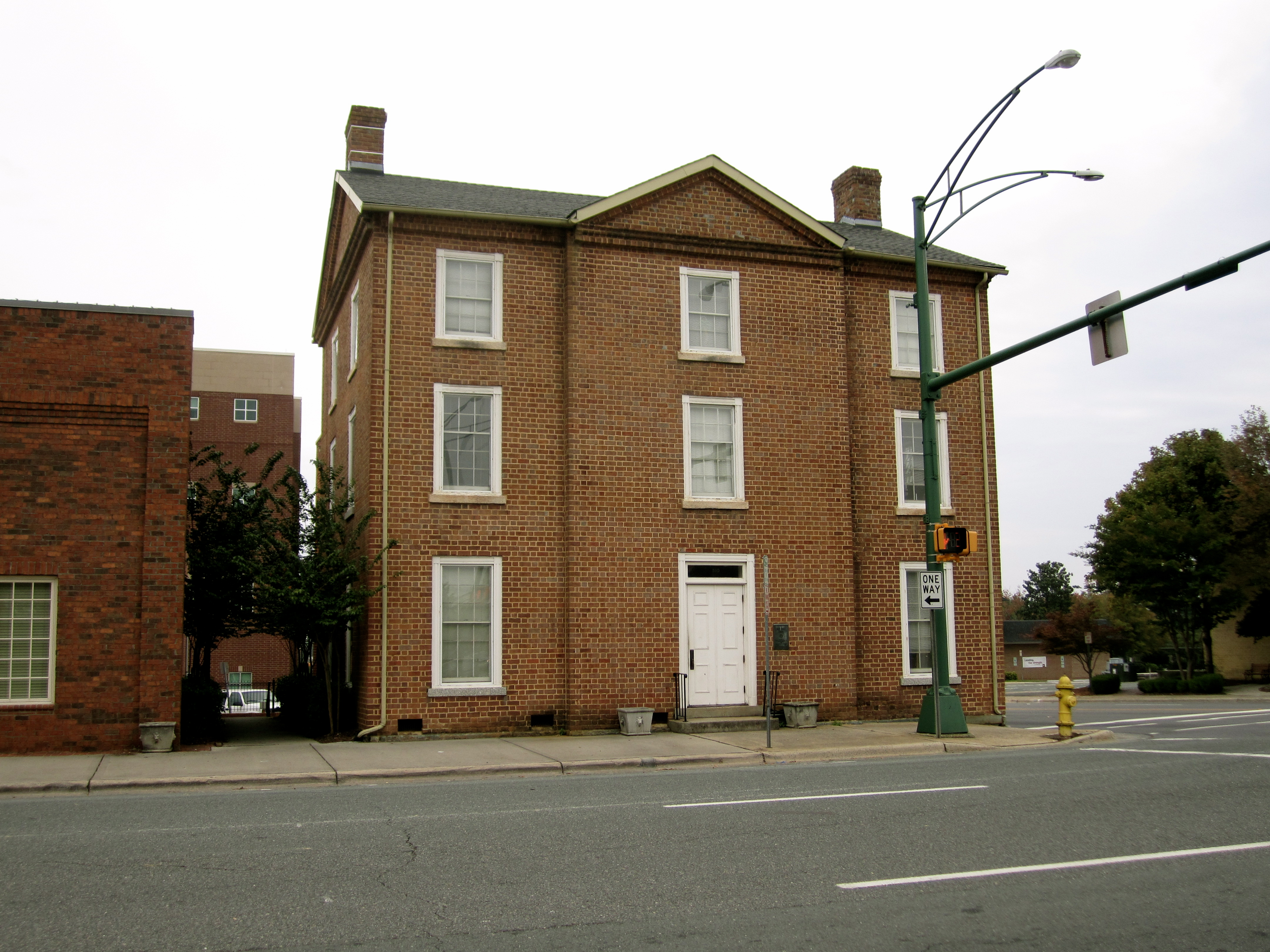
- Historic Monroe City Hall, September 2012

- Location within North Carolina Location within the United States
- Location: 102 W. Jefferson St., Monroe, North Carolina
- Coordinates: 34°59′01″N 80°32′59″W
- Area: 0.5 acres (0.20 ha)
- Built: 1847-1848
- Built by: Covington, David A.; Little, Aaron et al.
- NRHP reference No.: 71000619
- Added to NRHP: July 27, 1971

Monroe City Hall is a historic city hall building located at Monroe, Union County, North Carolina. It was built in 1847–1848, is a three-story brick building with interior end chimneys and a gableroof. It has a slightly projecting, one bay, center pavilion. A two-story wing was added in the 20th century. It was originally built as the public jail and is possibly the oldest building in Monroe.

It was listed on the National Register of Historic Places in 1971.
