= Waxhaw–Weddington Roads Historic District =

Historic district in North Carolina, United States

- U.S. National Register of Historic Places
- U.S. Historic district
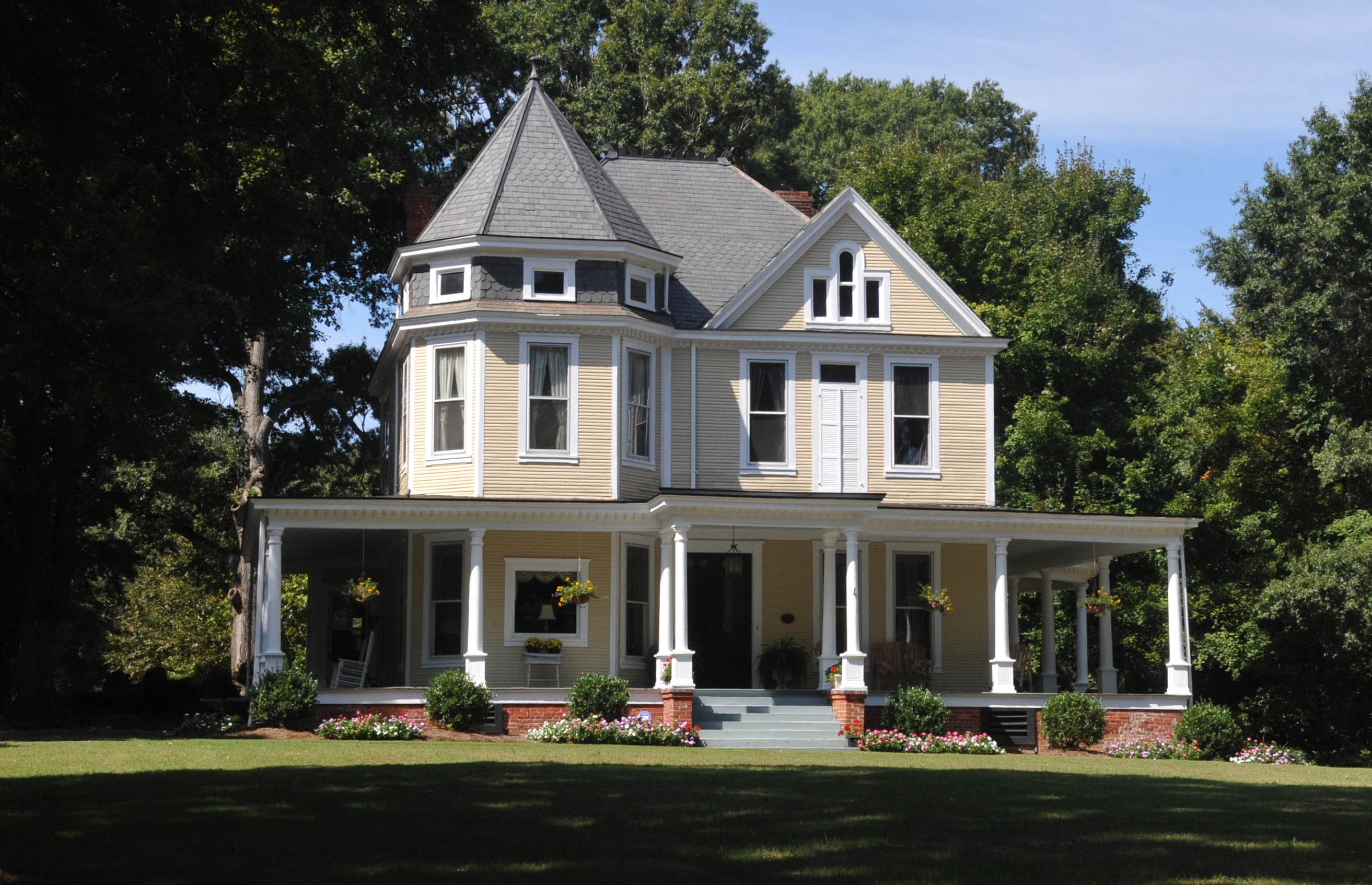
- Heath House (1897), Waxhaw–Weddington Roads Historic District, March 2007

- Location within North Carolina Location within the United States
- Location: Jct. of NC 75, NC 34 & W. Franklin St., Monroe, North Carolina
- Coordinates: 34°58′58″N 80°34′19″W
- Area: 36 acres (15 ha)
- Built: 1897
- Architect: Hook, Charles Christian; Tucker, G. Marion
- Architectural style: Classical Revival, Prairie School, Queen Anne
- NRHP reference No.: 87002201
- Added to NRHP: January 5, 1988

The Waxhaw–Weddington Roads Historic District is a national historic district located at Monroe, Union County, North Carolina. It encompasses 18 contributing buildings, 2 contributing structures, and 1 contributing object in a predominantly residential section of Monroe. The district developed between about 1897 and 1940 and includes notable examples of Prairie School, Queen Anne, and Classical Revival architecture styles and includes work by architects Charles Christian Hook and by G. Marion Tucker. Notable buildings include the Redwine Tenant House (1907), Robert B. Redwine House (1908), Heath House (1897), Edward Crow House (1916), and Crow's Nest (c. 1905).

It was listed on the National Register of Historic Places in 1988.
