= Piedmont Buggy Factory =

Historic factory in North Carolina, US

- U.S. National Register of Historic Places
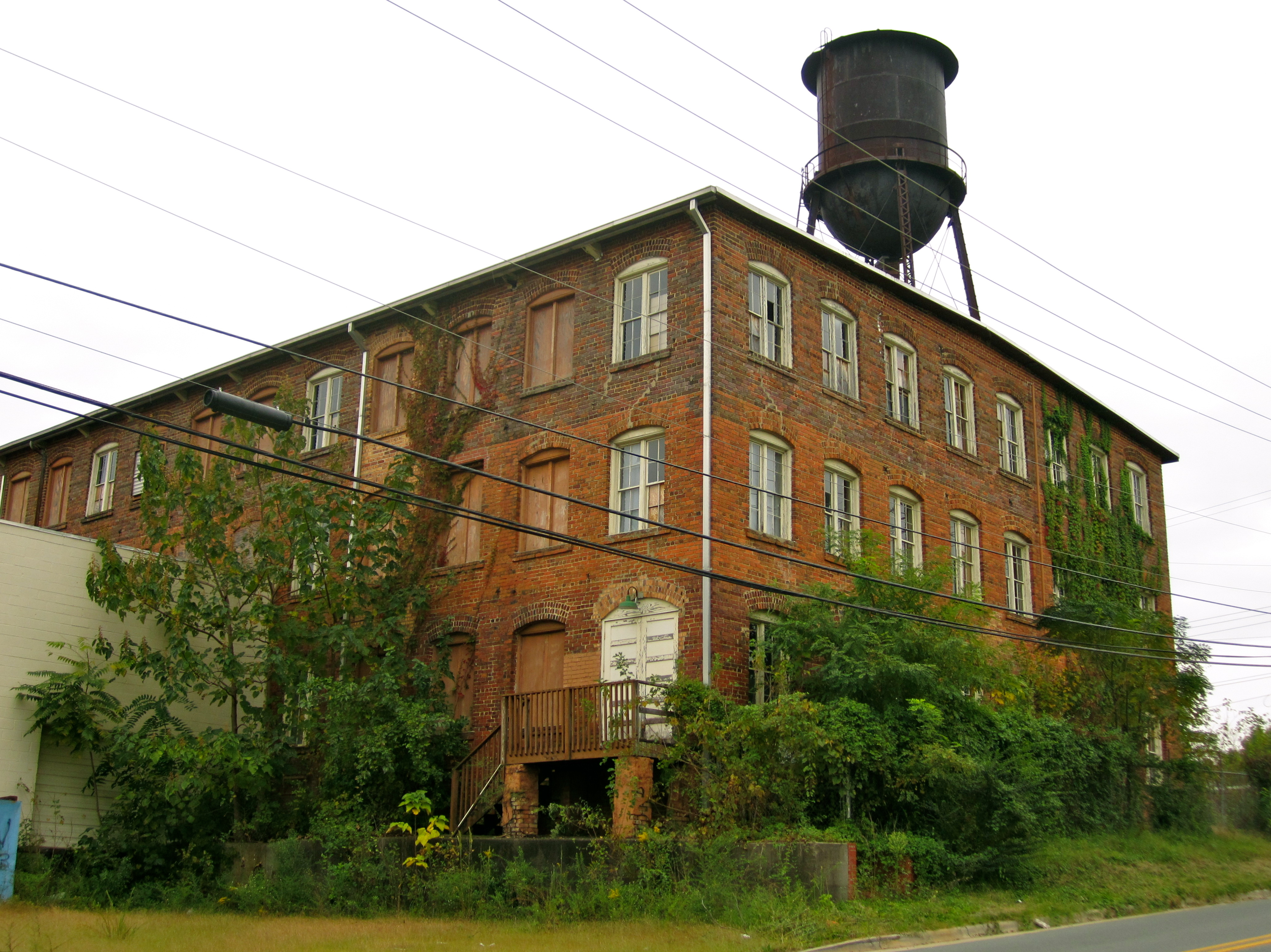
- Piedmont Buggy Factory, September 2012

- Location within North Carolina Location within the United States
- Location: 514 Miller St., Monroe, North Carolina
- Coordinates: 34°59′20″N 80°32′46″W
- Area: 2.4 acres (0.97 ha)
- Built: 1910
- Architectural style: Bungalow/craftsman
- NRHP reference No.: 04000569
- Added to NRHP: June 2, 2004

Piedmont Buggy Factory, also known as Bearskin Cotton Mills and Monroe Cotton Mills, is a historic building located at Monroe, Union County, North Carolina. It was built in 1910, and is a three-story, rectangular brick building with a shallow pitched gable roof. The brick is in six distinct shades of red. Also on the property are the contributing late-1910s one-story brick boiler house and a steel water tower (c. 1910). Originally built as a buggy factory, in the late 1910s the factory was converted to textile production and renamed the Bearskin Cotton Mills. The facility remained in operation through 1956.

It was listed on the National Register of Historic Places in 2004.
