= Monroe, North Carolina =

- City
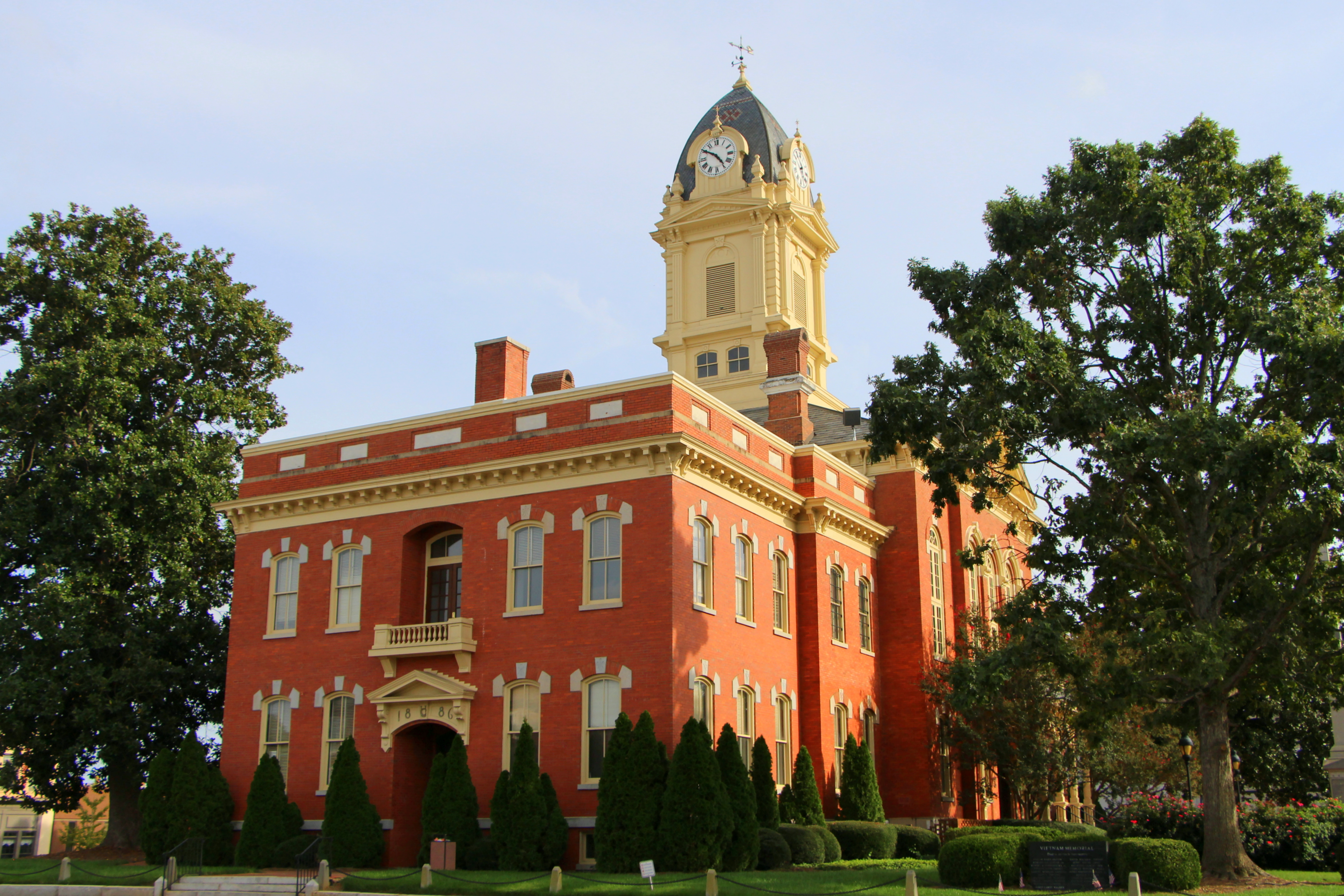
- The Union County Courthouse in Monroe

- Flag Seal
- Motto: Where Heartland Meets High Tech
- Interactive map of Monroe, North Carolina
- Location within North Carolina
- Coordinates: 35.0033°N 80.5589°W
- Country: United States
- State: North Carolina
- County: Union
- Founded: 1843
- Incorporated: December 24, 1844
- Named for: James Monroe

Government
  - Type: Council–Manager
  - Mayor: Robert Burns
  - Mayor Pro Tem: Surluta Anthony
  - City manager: Mark Watson
  - Councilmembers: David Dotson; James Kerr; Franco McGee; Julie Thompson

Area
  - City: 33.968 sq mi (87.977 km^{2})
  - Land: 33.335 sq mi (86.337 km^{2})
  - Water: 0.633 sq mi (1.639 km^{2}) 1.86%
- Elevation: 590 ft (180 m)

Population (2020)
  - City: 34,562
  - Estimate (2025): 42,644
  - Rank: US: 974th NC: 28th
  - Density: 1,036.8/sq mi (400.32/km^{2})
  - Urban: 1,379,873 (US: 37th)
  - Metro: 2,938,830 (US: 21st)
  - Combined: 3,533,073 (US: 19th)
- Time zone: UTC–5 (Eastern (EST))
  - Summer (DST): UTC–4 (EDT)
- ZIP Codes: 28110, 28111, 28112
- Area codes: 704 and 980
- FIPS code: 37-43920
- GNIS feature ID: 2404284
- Highways: US 74, US 74 Bypass, NC 75, NC 200, NC 207, US 601
- Website: monroenc.org

Monroe is a city in and the county seat of Union County, North Carolina, United States. The population was 34,562 as of the 2020 census, and was estimated at 42,644 in 2025, making it the 28th-most populous city in North Carolina. It is within the Charlotte metropolitan area. Monroe has a council-manager form of government.

== History ==
=== Early history ===
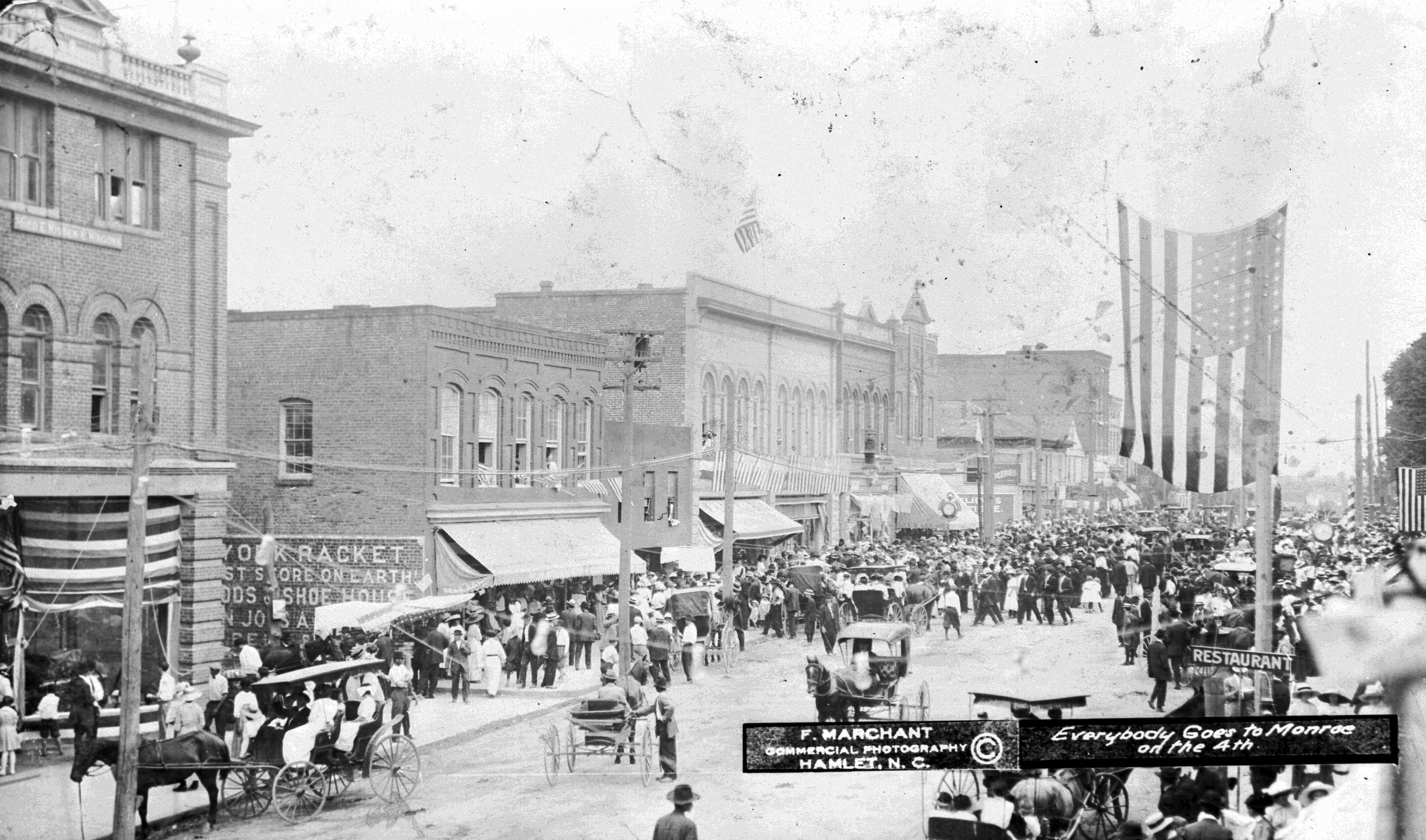
Monroe in the early 20th century

Monroe was founded as a planned settlement. In 1843, the first Board of County Commissioners, appointed by the General Assembly, selected an area in the center of the county as the county seat, and Monroe was incorporated that year. It was named for James Monroe, the country's fifth president. It became a trading center for the agricultural areas of the Piedmont region, which cultivated tobacco.

=== Civil rights struggle ===
Racial segregation established by a white-dominated state legislature after the end of the Reconstruction era persisted for nearly a century into the 1960s. Following World War II, many local blacks and veterans, including Marine veteran Robert F. Williams, began to push to regain their constitutional rights after having served the United States military during the war. Williams and the burgeoning NAACP chapter would be met with fierce resistance during their push to integrate local public facilities. During a 1957 effort to integrate a local swimming pool, the city had an estimated population of 12,000; the press reported an estimated 7,500 members of the Ku Klux Klan gathering in the city, many of whom arrived from across the South Carolina border just 14 miles away.

Williams was elected as president of the local chapter of the NAACP in 1951. He began to work to integrate public facilities, starting with the library and the city's swimming pool, which both excluded blacks. He noted that not only did blacks pay taxes as citizens that supported operations of such facilities, but they had been built with federal funds during the Great Depression of the 1930s.

In 1958 Williams hired Conrad Lynn, a civil rights attorney from New York City, to aid in defending two African-American boys, aged nine and seven. They had been convicted of "molestation" and sentenced to a reformatory until age 21 for kissing a white girl their age on the cheek. This became known as the Kissing Case. The former First Lady, Eleanor Roosevelt, talked to the North Carolina governor (Luther H. Hodges) to urge restraint, and the case became internationally embarrassing for the United States. After three months, the governor pardoned the boys.

During the civil rights movement years of the 1960s, there was rising in Ku Klux Klan white violence against the minority black community of Monroe. Williams began to advocate black armed self-defense. Groups known as the Deacons for Defense, were founded by other civil rights leaders in Louisiana and Mississippi.

The NAACP and the black community in Monroe provided a base for some of the Freedom Riders in 1961, who were trying to integrate interstate bus travel through southern states. They had illegally imposed segregation in such buses in the South, although interstate travel was protected under the federal constitution's provisions regulating interstate commerce. Mobs attacked pickets marching for the Freedom Riders at the county courthouse. That year, Williams was accused of kidnapping an elderly white couple, when he sheltered them in his house during an explosive situation of high racial tensions.

Williams and his wife fled the United States to avoid prosecution for kidnapping. They went into exile for years in Cuba and in the People's Republic of China. In 1969 they finally returned to the United States, after Congress had passed important civil rights legislation in 1964 and 1965. The trial of Williams was scheduled in 1975, but North Carolina finally reviewed its case and dropped the charges against him.

The Jesse Helms family was prominent among the white community during these years. Jesse Helms Sr. served as Police and Fire Chief of Monroe for many years. Jesse Helms, Jr. was born and grew up in the town, where whites were Democrats in his youth. He became a politician and was elected to five terms (1973–2003) as a U.S. Senator from North Carolina, switching to the Republican Party as it attracted conservative whites. He mustered support in the South, and played a key role in helping Ronald Reagan to be elected as President of the United States. Through that period, he was also a prominent (and often controversial) national leader of the Religious Right wing of the Republican Party. The Jesse Helms Center is in neighboring Wingate, North Carolina.

=== Late 20th century to present ===
Monroe was home to the Starlite Speedway in the 1960s to 1970s. On May 13, 1966, the 1/2-mile dirt track hosted NASCAR's 'Independent 250'. Darel Dieringer won the race.

Since 1984, Ludwig Drums and timpani have been manufactured in Monroe.

As part of the developing Charlotte metropolitan area, in the 21st century, Monroe has attracted new Hispanic residents. North Carolina has encouraged immigration to increase its labor pool.

=== National Register of Historic Places ===
The Malcolm K. Lee House, Monroe City Hall, Monroe Downtown Historic District, Monroe Residential Historic District, Piedmont Buggy Factory, John C. Sikes House, Union County Courthouse, United States Post Office, and Waxhaw–Weddington Roads Historic District are listed on the National Register of Historic Places.

== Geography ==
According to the United States Census Bureau, the city has an area of 33.968 square miles (87.98 km^{2}), of which 33.335 square miles (86.34 km^{2}) is land and 0.633 square miles (1.64 km^{2}) (1.86%) is water.

== Demographics ==
Historical population
Census	Pop.	Note	%±
1850	204		—
1860	239		17.2%
1870	1,144		378.7%
1880	1,564		36.7%
1890	1,866		19.3%
1900	2,427		30.1%
1910	4,082		68.2%
1920	4,084		0.0%
1930	6,100		49.4%
1940	6,475		6.1%
1950	10,140		56.6%
1960	10,882		7.3%
1970	11,282		3.7%
1980	12,639		12.0%
1990	16,127		27.6%
2000	26,228		62.6%
2010	32,797		25.0%
2020	34,562		5.4%
2025 (est.)	42,644		23.4%
U.S. Decennial Census; 2020 Census

According to realtor website Zillow, the average price of a home as of August 31, 2026, in Monroe was $356,798.

As of the 2024 American Community Survey, there were 12,620 estimated households in Monroe with an average of 2.86 persons per household. The city has a median household income of $72,540. Approximately 13.3% of the city's population lives at or below the poverty line. Monroe has an estimated 61.2% employment rate, with 24.1% of the population holding a bachelor's degree or higher and 82.6% holding a high school diploma. There were 13,469 housing units at an average density of 404.05 per square mile (156.00/km^{2}).

The top five reported languages (people were allowed to report up to two languages, thus the figures will generally add to more than 100%) were English (70.7%), Spanish (27.8%), Indo-European (0.8%), Asian and Pacific Islander (0.5%), and Other (0.3%).

The median age in the city was 35.5 years.

Monroe, North Carolina – racial and ethnic composition Note: the US Census treats Hispanic/Latino as an ethnic category. This table excludes Latinos from the racial categories and assigns them to a separate category. Hispanics/Latinos may be of any race.
Race / ethnicity (NH = non-Hispanic)	Pop. 1990	Pop. 2000	Pop. 2010	Pop. 2020	% 1990	% 2000	% 2010	% 2020
White alone (NH)	9,311	12,998	14,149	14,118	57.74%	49.56%	43.14%	40.85%
Black or African American alone (NH)	6,448	7,155	8,142	7,787	39.98%	27.28%	24.83%	22.53%
Native American or Alaska Native alone (NH)	55	86	92	97	0.34%	0.33%	0.28%	0.28%
Asian alone (NH)	94	166	287	390	0.58%	0.63%	0.88%	1.13%
Pacific Islander alone (NH)	—	7	4	15	—	0.03%	0.01%	0.04%
Other race alone (NH)	4	20	49	139	0.02%	0.08%	0.15%	0.40%
Mixed race or multiracial (NH)	—	185	423	1,077	—	0.71%	1.29%	3.12%
Hispanic or Latino (any race)	215	5,611	9,651	10,939	1.33%	21.39%	29.43%	31.65%
Total	16,127	26,228	32,797	34,562	100.00%	100.00%	100.00%	100.00%

=== 2020 census ===
As of the 2020 census, there were 34,562 people, 12,160 households, and 8,526 families residing in the city. The population density was 1,129.11 inhabitants per square mile (435.95/km^{2}). There were 12,924 housing units at an average density of 422.21 per square mile (163.02/km^{2}). The racial makeup of the city was 44.07% White, 22.96% African American, 1.11% Native American, 1.15% Asian, 0.07% Pacific Islander, 21.42% from some other races and 9.22% from two or more races. Hispanic or Latino people of any race were 31.65% of the population.

=== 2010 census ===
As of the 2010 census, there were 32,797 people, 11,120 households, and 7,878 families residing in the city. The population density was 1,102.20 inhabitants per square mile (425.56/km^{2}). There were 12,375 housing units at an average density of 415.88 per square mile (160.57/km^{2}). The racial makeup of the city was 52.03% White, 25.23% African American, 0.62% Native American, 0.92% Asian, 0.02% Pacific Islander, 18.62% from some other races and 2.57% from two or more races. Hispanic or Latino people of any race were 29.43% of the population.

=== 2000 census ===
As of the 2000 census, there were 26,228 people, 9,029 households, and 6,392 families residing in the city. The population density was 1,067.45 inhabitants per square mile (412.14/km^{2}). There were 9,621 housing units at an average density of 391.57 per square mile (151.19/km^{2}). The racial makeup of the city was 60.12% White, 27.78% African American, 0.44% Native American, 0.65% Asian, 0.03% Pacific Islander, 9.37% from some other races and 1.60% from two or more races. Hispanic or Latino people of any race were 21.39% of the population.

There were 9,029 households, out of which 33.7% had children under the age of 18 living with them, 49.0% were married couples living together, 15.9% had a female householder with no husband present, and 29.2% were non-families. 23.3% of all households were made up of individuals, and 8.3% had someone living alone who was 65 years of age or older. The average household size was 2.83 and the average family size was 3.27.

In the city, the population was spread out, with 26.9% under the age of 18, 11.6% from 18 to 24, 32.6% from 25 to 44, 18.0% from 45 to 64, and 10.8% who were 65 years of age or older. The median age was 31 years. For every 100 females, there were 102.5 males. For every 100 females age 18 and over, there were 101.1 males.

The median income for a household in the city was $40,457, and the median income for a family was $44,953. Males had a median income of $30,265 versus $22,889 for females. The per capita income for the city was $17,970. 17.2% of the population and 11.7% of families were below the poverty line. Out of the total people living in poverty, 28.7% were under the age of 18 and 12.8% were 65 or older.

== Sports ==
Two minor league baseball teams in the Western Carolinas League were based in Monroe. The Monroe Indians played in the city in 1969, while the Monroe Pirates played there in 1971.

== Media ==
The local newspaper is The Enquirer-Journal, which is published three days a week (Wednesday, Friday and Sunday).

The local radio stations are WIXE 1190 AM radio and WDZD 99.1 FM.

== Transportation ==
U.S. Route 74 runs east-west through Monroe; U.S. Route 601 runs north-south through the city. The Monroe Expressway bypasses the city.

Charlotte–Monroe Executive Airport (EQY) is located 5 mi (8.0 km) northwest of Monroe. Charlotte Douglas International Airport, the nearest airport with commercial flights is 37 mi (60 km) northwest of Monroe.

The Seaboard Air Line Railroad ran multiple passenger trains a day on the Raleigh-Athens-Atlanta route through Monroe, including the Silver Comet (New York-Birmingham). The SAL also operated Charlotte (SAL station)-Hamlet-Wilmington passenger trains, also making stops in Monroe. This Charlotte-Wilmington service ended in 1958. The last train was the Silver Comet, ending service in October 1969. Trains used to stop at the Seaboard Air Line Railroad depot.

== Notable people ==
- Adrian Autry, retired professional basketball player who is currently the associate head coach for the Syracuse Orange
- Terry Baucom, banjoist
- Thomas Walter Bickett, 54th Governor of North Carolina (1917–1921)
- Skipper Bowles, politician
- Walter P. Carter, civil rights activist
- Gil Coan, Major League Baseball player
- Grover Covington, Canadian Football Hall of Famer
- Jamison Crowder, NFL wide receiver for Washington Commanders
- Carlo Curley, classical organist
- Christine Darden, aeronautical engineer at NASA; first African-American woman at agency promoted to Senior Executive Service, top rank of federal civil service
- Theodore L. Futch, Brigadier general in the United States Army during World War II
- JoJo Hailey, R&B and soul singer-songwriter
- K-ci Hailey, R&B and soul singer-songwriter
- Jesse Helms, U.S. Senator
- Martha Blakeney Hodges, First Lady of North Carolina
- Richard Huntley, former NFL running back
- Beth Kennett, first woman mayor of Burlington, North Carolina
- Michael Macchiavello, American freestyle and folkstyle wrestler, won NCAA Wrestling national championship at NC State
- Carroll McCray, NCAA head football coach of Gardner-Webb University
- Jeff McNeely, Major League Baseball player
- James W. Nance, U.S. Navy officer, 10th Deputy National Security Advisor (1981–1982)
- John J. Parker, U.S. judge who served on tribunal of Nuremberg Trials
- Samuel I. Parker, recipient of the Medal of Honor for his actions during World War I
- Aaron W. Plyler, politician and businessman
- Mike Pope, former NFL tight end coach
- Calvin Richardson, R&B and soul singer-songwriter
- Speedy Thompson, former NASCAR driver
- Andy Tomberlin, Major League Baseball player
- John Tsitouris, Major League Baseball pitcher
- Paul Waggoner, guitarist for Between the Buried and Me
- Robert F. Williams, civil rights activist
- Scott Williams, serial killer
- Terry Witherspoon, former NFL fullback
