= Monroe and Walton Mills Historic District =

Historic district in Georgia, United States

- U.S. National Register of Historic Places
- Location within Georgia
- Location: S. Broad St., S. Madison Ave., and Georgia RR line, Monroe, Georgia
- Coordinates: 33°47′05″N 83°42′33″W
- Area: 120 acres (49 ha)
- Built by: T.J. Nichols (contractor for Walton Mills)
- MPS: Monroe MRA
- NRHP reference No.: 83003617
- Added to NRHP: December 28, 1983

The Monroe and Walton Mills Historic District in Monroe, Georgia is a 120 acres (49 ha) historic district which was listed on the National Register of Historic Places in 1983. The listing included 236 contributing buildings.

It is an industrial district, including four types of uses: mill buildings, mill houses, support buildings, and an area of large houses.

The Monroe Cotton Mill building is a two-story building, begun in 1895, with brick walls 16 inches (0.41 m) thick. It would eventually have 5,000 spindles.

The Walton Cotton Mill building was built during 1900–01.
