= John C. Sikes House =

Historic house in North Carolina, United States

- U.S. National Register of Historic Places
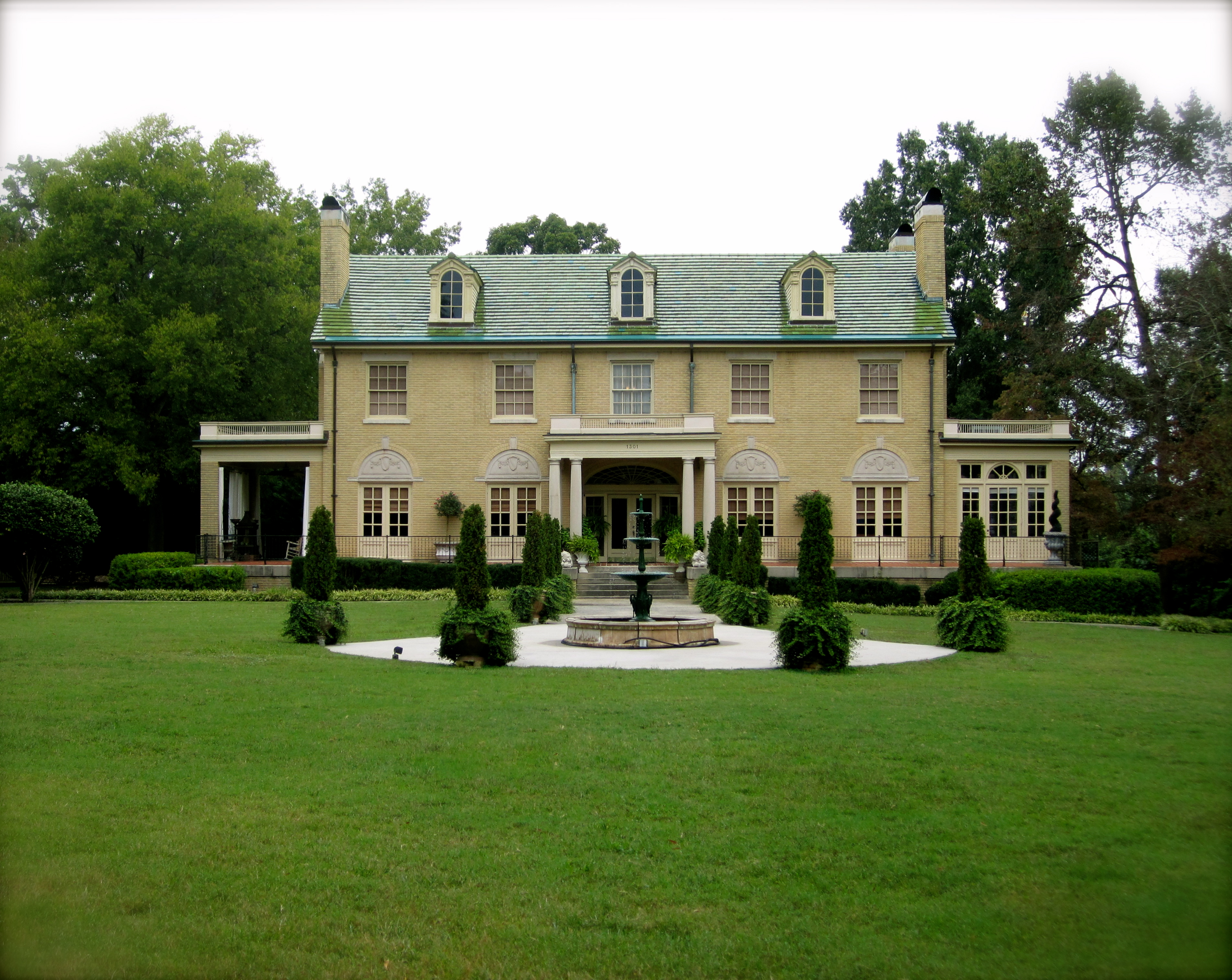
- John C. Sikes House, September 2012

- Location within North Carolina Location within the United States
- Location: 1301 E. Franklin St., Monroe, North Carolina
- Coordinates: 34°58′27″N 80°31′25″W
- Area: 3.9 acres (1.6 ha)
- Built: 1926-1927
- Architect: Sutherland, Louis D.; Tucker, G. M.
- Architectural style: Classical Revival, Neo-Classical Revival
- NRHP reference No.: 82003518
- Added to NRHP: April 15, 1982

John C. Sikes House is a historic home located at Monroe, Union County, North Carolina. It was built in 1926–1927, and consists of a 2 1/2-story, five bay by four bay, Classical Revival-style main block with a two-story rear ell. The house is constructed of yellow Roman brick and has a gable roof. The front facade features a parapeted portico supported by six stone Tuscan order columns.

It was listed on the National Register of Historic Places in 1982.
