= Malcolm K. Lee House =

Historic house in North Carolina, United States

- U.S. National Register of Historic Places
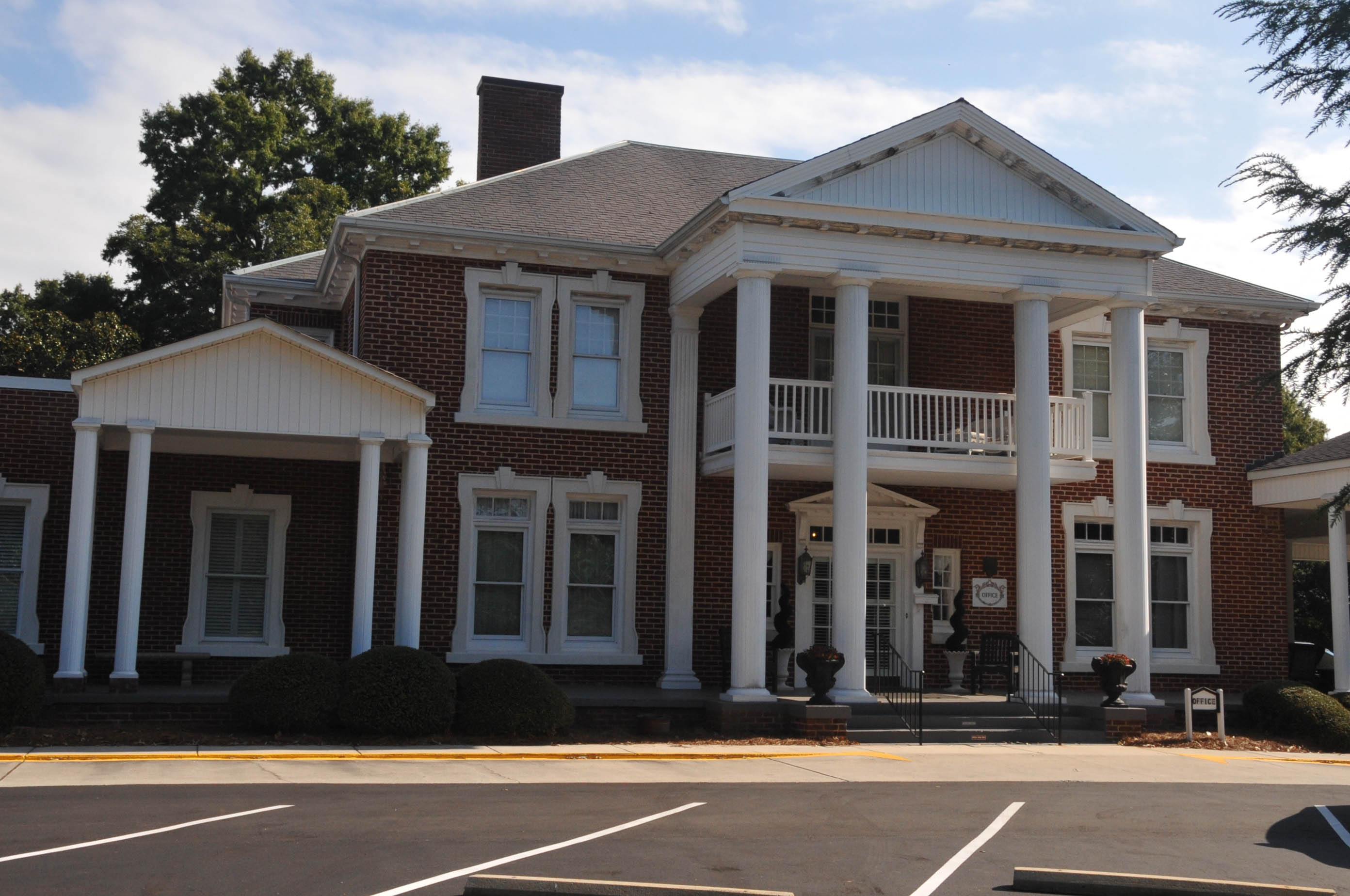
- Malcolm K. Lee House, March 2007

- Location within North Carolina Location within the United States
- Location: Main Street, Monroe, North Carolina
- Coordinates: 34°58′39″N 80°32′03″W
- Area: 4.5 acres (1.8 ha)
- Built: 1919
- Architect: Tucker, G. Marion
- Architectural style: Colonial Revival
- NRHP reference No.: 87002200
- Added to NRHP: January 5, 1988

Malcolm K. Lee House is a historic home located at Monroe, Union County, North Carolina. It was built in 1919, and is a two-story, five-bay, Colonial Revival-style brick veneer dwelling with a slate covered hipped roof. It has two two-story, hipped-roofed rear wings forming a "U". The front facade features a two-story, wooden portico supported by pairs of fluted columns with Greek Doric order capitals.

It was listed on the National Register of Historic Places in 1988.
