= Monroe Courts Historic District =

Historic district in Virginia, United States

- U.S. National Register of Historic Places
- U.S. Historic district
- Virginia Landmarks Register
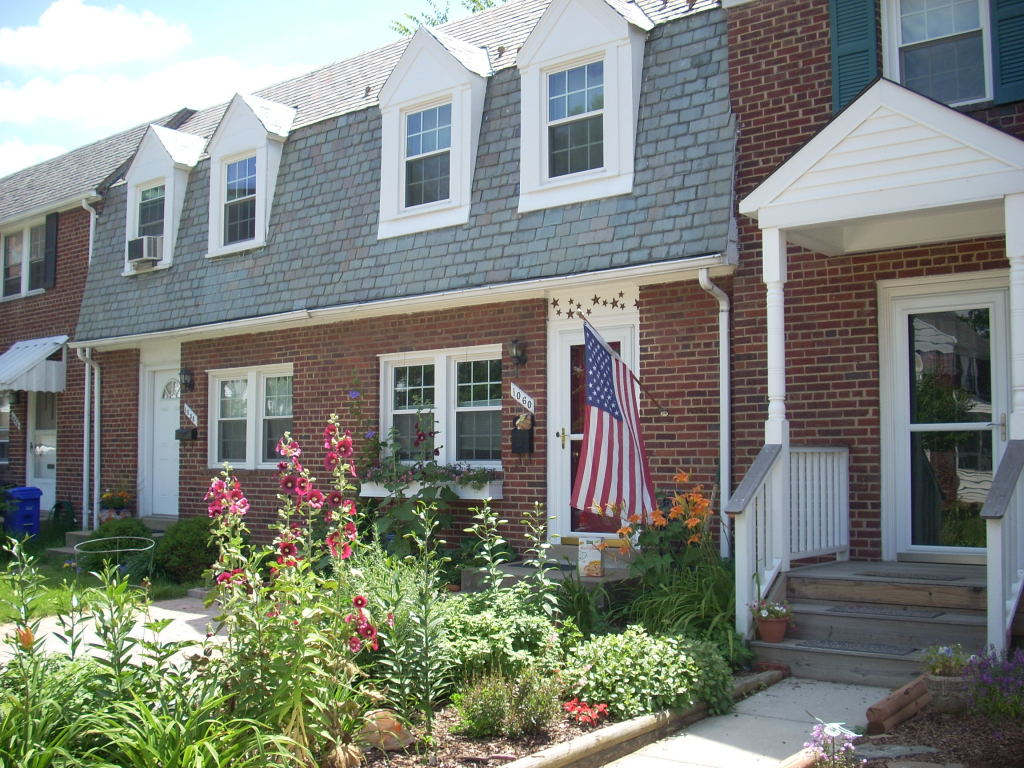
- Monroe Courts, June 2009

- Location within District of Columbia Location within Virginia Location within the United States
- Location: Bounded by 10th St N, N. Monroe St., Washington Blvd. and N. Nelson St., Arlington, Virginia
- Coordinates: 38°53′09″N 77°6′18″W
- Area: 2.4 acres (0.97 ha)
- Built: 1938
- Architect: Cobb, John D.; Gosnell, Clarence W.
- Architectural style: Colonial Revival
- MPS: Historic Residential Suburbs in the United States, 1830-1960 MPS
- NRHP reference No.: 08000064
- VLR No.: 000-4105

Significant dates
- Added to NRHP: February 21, 2008
- Designated VLR: December 5, 2007

The Monroe Courts Historic District is a national historic district located at Arlington County, Virginia. It contains 39 contributing buildings in a residential neighborhood in northern Arlington. They were built in 1938, and consist of four groups of two-story, two-bay, rowhouse dwellings in a vernacular Colonial Revival-style. They were built for a middle-class clientele in a fast-growing commuter suburb of Washington, D.C.

It was listed on the National Register of Historic Places in 2004.
