= United States Post Office (Monroe, North Carolina) =

Historic building in North Carolina, US

- US Post Office-Monroe
- U.S. National Register of Historic Places
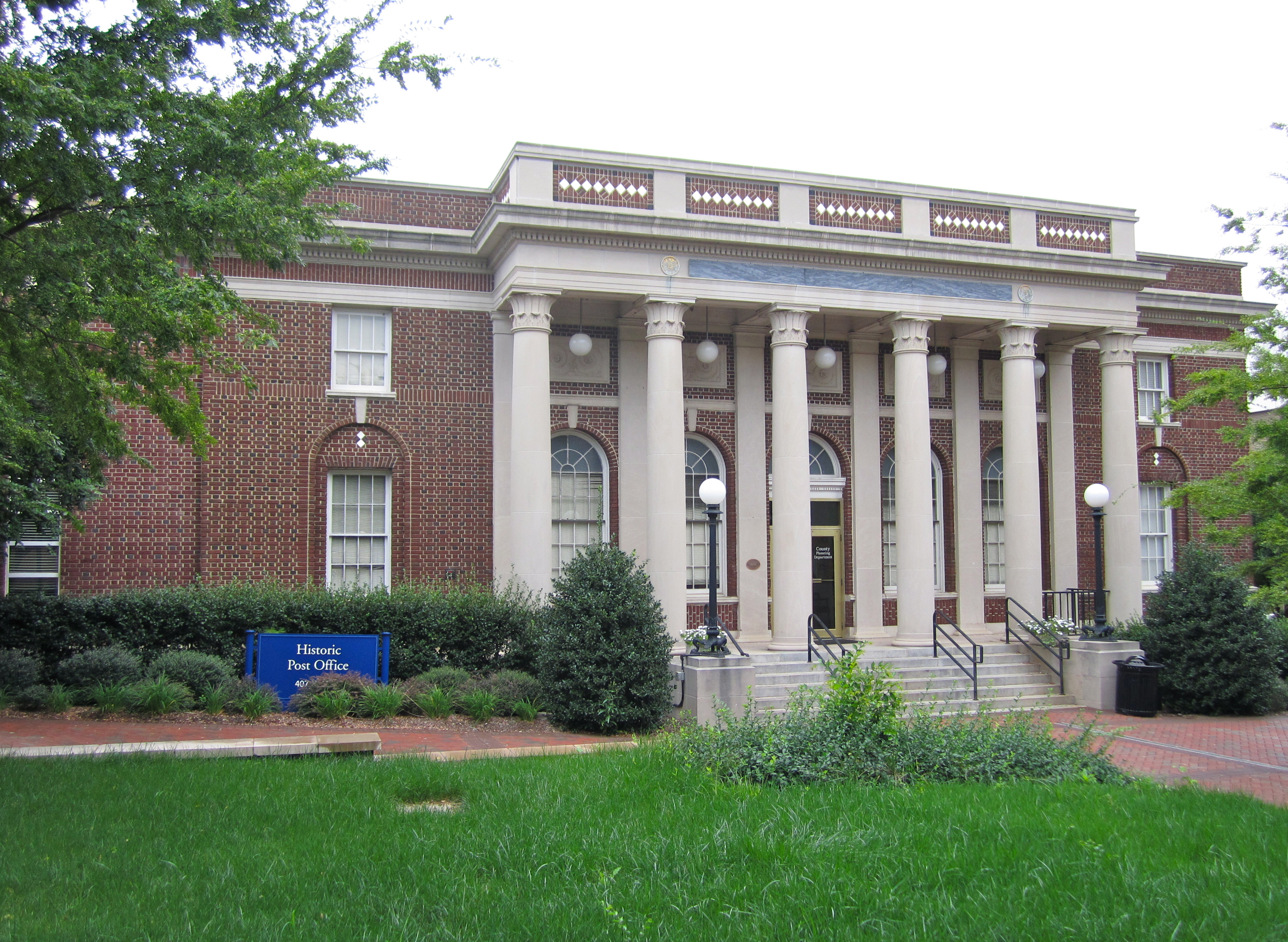
- US Post Office-Monroe, September 2012

- Location within North Carolina Location within the United States
- Location: 407 N. Main St., Monroe, North Carolina
- Coordinates: 34°59′1″N 80°33′3″W
- Area: 0.8 acres (0.32 ha)
- Built: 1913
- Architect: Wendroth, Oscar
- Architectural style: Classical Revival
- NRHP reference No.: 85000482
- Added to NRHP: March 6, 1985

US Post Office-Monroe is a historic post office building located at Monroe, Union County, North Carolina. It was designed by the Office of the Supervising Architect under the direction of Oscar Wenderoth and built in 1913. It is a two-story, seven bay by four bay, brick building in the Classical Revival style. The front facade features a five bay portico supported by Corinthian order columns. Two additions were made to the building in 1966.

It was listed on the National Register of Historic Places in 1985.
