= Monroe Downtown Historic District =

Historic district in North Carolina, United States

- U.S. National Register of Historic Places
- U.S. Historic district
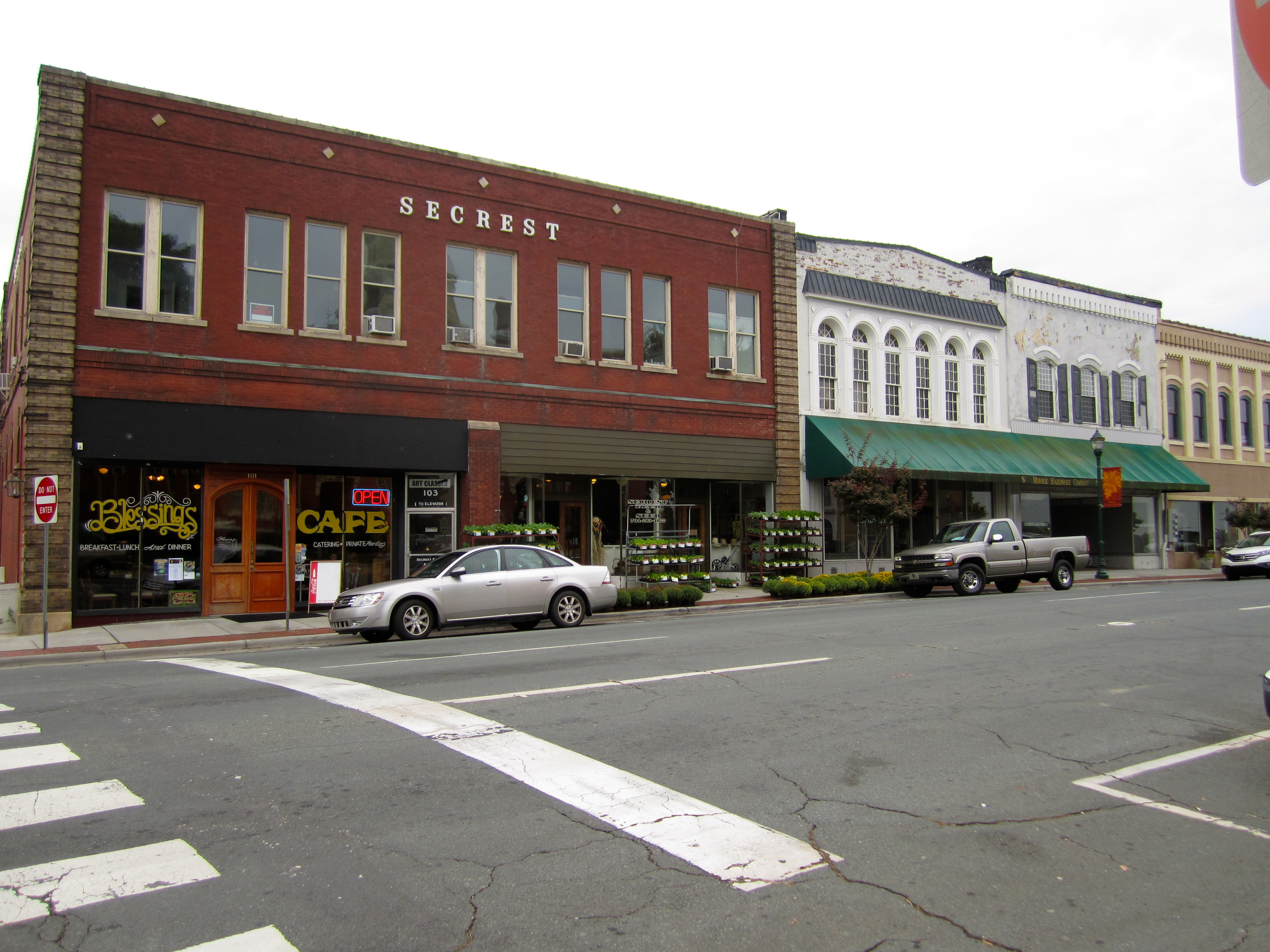
- Historic Secrest Building and Monroe Hardware Company, September 2012

- Location within North Carolina Location within the United States
- Location: Roughly bounded by Jefferson, Church, Windsor & Stewart Sts., Monroe, North Carolina
- Coordinates: 34°58′55″N 80°33′00″W
- Area: 11 acres (4.5 ha)
- Architect: Holt, Thomas; Et al.
- Architectural style: Classical Revival, Late Victorian, Late Victorian Eclectic
- NRHP reference No.: 87002202
- Added to NRHP: January 6, 1988

Monroe Downtown Historic District is a national historic district located at Monroe, Union County, North Carolina. It encompasses 25 contributing buildings and 1 contributing object in the central business district of Monroe. The district developed during the late 19th and early 20th centuries and includes notable examples of Late Victorian and Classical Revival architecture styles. Located in the district is the separately listed Union County Courthouse. Other notable buildings include the Hotel Joffre Building (1917-1919), Bank of Union Building (1905-1906), Belk/Bundy Building (1911), Monroe Bank & Trust Company Building (1919-1920), Monroe Hardware Company Building (1928), and Secrest Building (1928).

It was listed on the National Register of Historic Places in 1988.
