= 1920 North Carolina gubernatorial election =

- November 2, 1920
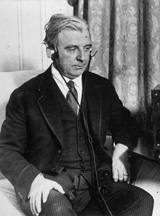

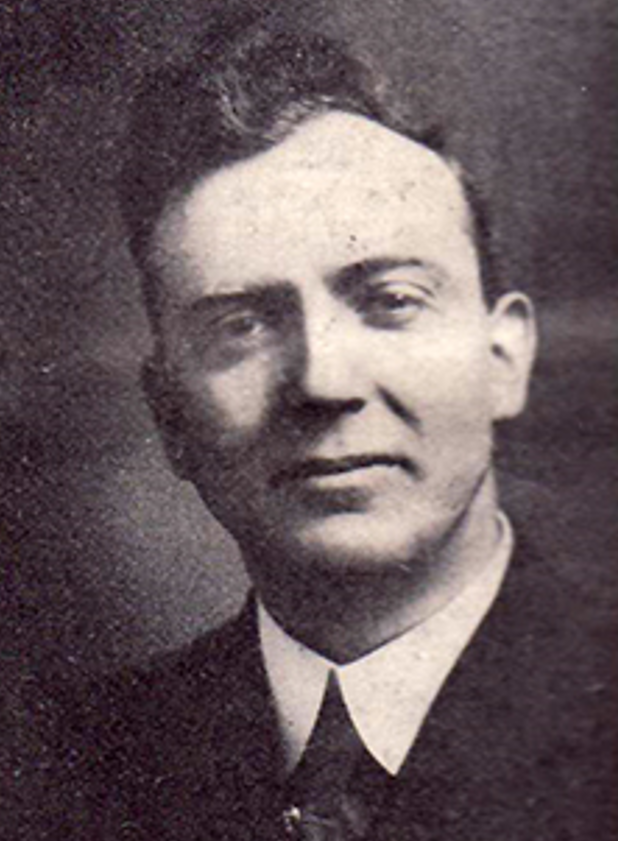
Nominee	Cameron A. Morrison	John J. Parker
Party	Democratic	Republican
Popular vote	308,151	230,175
Percentage	57.21%	42.73%
- County results Morrison: 50–60% 60–70% 70–80% 80–90% >90% Parker: 50–60% 60–70% 70–80% 80–90%
Governor before election
Thomas W. Bickett
Democratic
Elected Governor
Cameron A. Morrison
Democratic

The 1920 North Carolina gubernatorial election was held on November 2, 1920. Democratic nominee Cameron A. Morrison defeated Republican nominee John J. Parker with 57.2% of the vote. Both were attorneys in private practice at the time.

== Primary elections ==
Only the Democratic Party held a primary election for the gubernatorial nomination at the time. Because no candidate won an absolute majority in the first round on June 5, a second primary (or "runoff") was held on July 3, 1920.

=== Democratic primary ===
==== Candidates ====
- O. Max Gardner, incumbent Lieutenant Governor of North Carolina
- Cameron A. Morrison, former state senator
- Robert N. Page, former member of the U.S. House of Representatives

==== Results ====
Democratic primary results (First Primary)
Party	Candidate	Votes	%
Democratic	Cameron A. Morrison	49,070	38.3%
Democratic	O. Max Gardner	48,983	38.2%
Democratic	Robert N. Page	30,180	23.5%
Total votes		128,233	100.00

Morrison: Morrison—30–40%; Morrison—40–50%; Morrison—50–60%; Morrison—60–70%; Morrison—70–80%; Morrison—80–90%; Gardner: Gardner—30–40%; Gardner—40–50%; Gardner—50–60%; Gardner—60–70%; Gardner—70–80%; Gardner—80–90%; Page: Page—30–40%; Page—40–50%; Page—50–60%; Page—60–70%; Page—70–80%

Democratic primary results (Second Primary)
Party	Candidate	Votes	%
Democratic	Cameron A. Morrison	70,332	53.5%
Democratic	O. Max Gardner	61,073	46.5%
Total votes		131,405	100.00

== General election ==
=== Candidates ===
- Cameron Morrison, Democratic
- John J. Parker, Republican
- William B. Taylor, Socialist

=== Results ===
1920 North Carolina gubernatorial election
Party	Candidate	Votes	%	±%
Democratic	Cameron A. Morrison	308,151	57.21%	
Republican	John J. Parker	230,175	42.73%	
Socialist	W. B. Taylor	336	0.06%	
Majority				
Turnout		538,662		
Democratic hold		Swing		
