= John J. Parker =

American judge (1885–1958)

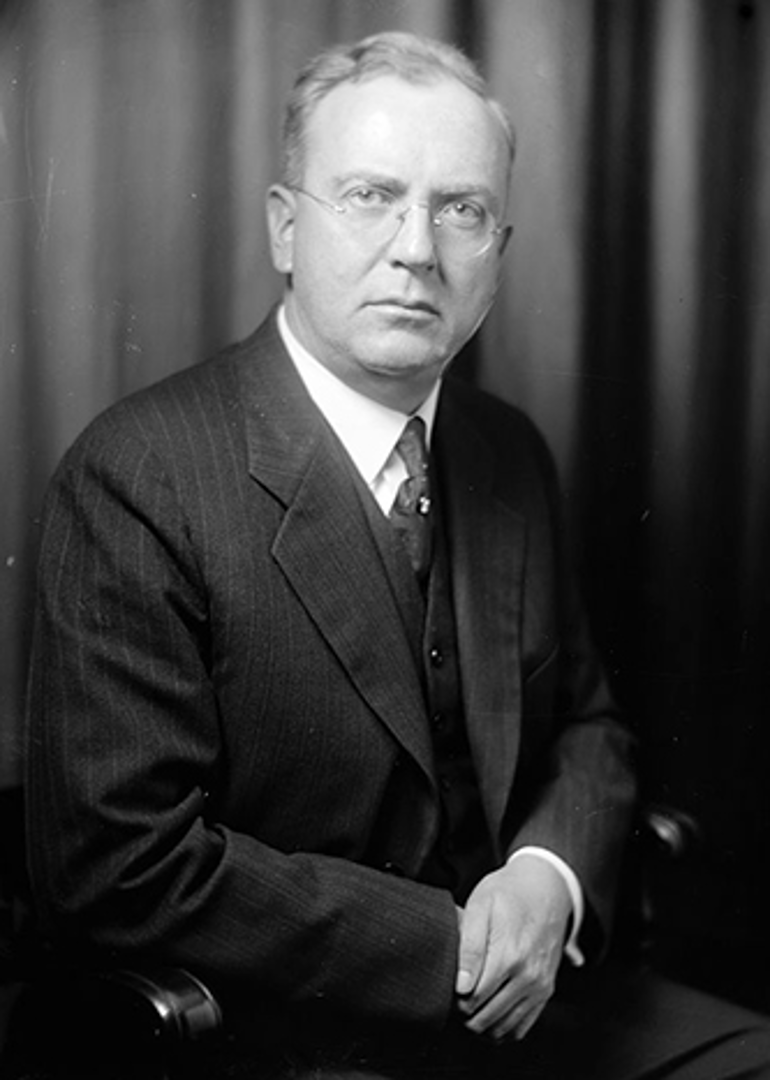
- Parker, 1905–1945

Chief Judge of the United States Court of Appeals for the Fourth Circuit
- In office September 1, 1948 – March 17, 1958
- Preceded by: Position established
- Succeeded by: Simon Sobeloff

Judge of the United States Court of Appeals for the Fourth Circuit
- In office December 14, 1925 – March 17, 1958
- Appointed by: Calvin Coolidge
- Preceded by: Charles Albert Woods
- Succeeded by: Herbert Stephenson Boreman

Personal details
- Born: John Johnston Parker; November 20, 1885 Monroe, North Carolina, U.S.
- Died: March 17, 1958 (aged 72) Washington, D.C., U.S.
- Party: Republican
- Education: University of North Carolina, Chapel Hill (BA, LLB)

John Johnston Parker (November 20, 1885 – March 17, 1958) was an American politician and United States circuit judge of the United States Court of Appeals for the Fourth Circuit. He was an unsuccessful nominee for associate justice of the United States Supreme Court in 1930. He was also the United States alternate judge at the Nuremberg trials of accused Nazi war criminals and later served on the United Nations' International Law Commission.

== Early and family life ==
Born on November 20, 1885, in Monroe, North Carolina, Parker was the oldest of four children born to Frances Ann (Johnston) and John Daniel Parker. He was a descendent of William Bradford, a founder of Plymouth Colony, in Massachusetts, and of associate justice of the Supreme Court of the United States James Iredell. He was also a brother of Samuel I. Parker, first recipient of the army's three highest decorations for valor.

Parker received a Bachelor of Arts degree in 1907 from the University of North Carolina at Chapel Hill, where he was elected to membership in Phi Beta Kappa and was class president. He received a Bachelor of Laws in 1908 from the University of North Carolina School of Law. Following a legal apprenticeship in Greensboro, North Carolina, he practiced law in Monroe from 1909 to 1922, and then in Charlotte, North Carolina until 1925.

On November 23, 1910, he married Maria Burgwin Maffitt. They had three children: Sara Burgwin, John Jr., and Francis Iredell.

Parker ran unsuccessfully for political office on three occasions as a Republican. In 1910, he was a candidate for the United States House of Representatives from North Carolina's 10th congressional district. In 1916, he was a candidate for Attorney General of North Carolina. Then, in 1920, he was a candidate for Governor of North Carolina.

From 1923 to 1924 Parker served as a special assistant to the Attorney General of the United States. He was tasked with prosecution of former Wilson Administration officials for alleged frauds associated with World War I demobilization. His efforts resulted in no indictments or convictions. Nonetheless, he made favorable impressions upon Justice Department colleagues, including then Attorney General and future Supreme Court Justice Harlan F. Stone.

== Federal judicial service ==
Parker received a recess appointment from President Calvin Coolidge on October 3, 1925, to a seat on the United States Court of Appeals for the Fourth Circuit vacated by Judge Charles Albert Woods. He was nominated to the same position by President Coolidge on December 8, 1925. He was confirmed by the United States Senate on December 14, 1925, and received his commission the same day. He was a member of the Conference of Senior Circuit Judges (now the Judicial Conference of the United States) from 1931 to 1948, and was a member of the Judicial Conference of the United States from 1948 to 1957. Parker served as Chief Judge from 1948 until his death in 1958.

As a circuit judge, Parker played a pivotal role in the case of Briggs v. Elliott, 342 U.S. 350 (1952), one of the school desegregation cases that was consolidated into the landmark Brown v. Board of Education, 347 U.S. 483 (1954), case. Parker ruled in 1951 that, while the specific schools in South Carolina being challenged by the National Association for the Advancement of Colored People (NAACP) were unequal and violated the "separate but equal" requirement under Plessy v. Ferguson, segregation in public schools was constitutional.

"[W]hen seventeen states and the Congress of the United States have for more than three-quarters of a century required segregation of the races in the public schools, and when this has received the approval of the leading appellate courts of the country including the unanimous approval of the Supreme Court of the United States at a time when that court included Chief Justice Taft and Justices Stone, Holmes and Brandeis, it is a late day to say that such segregation is violative of fundamental constitutional rights," Parker wrote in his 1951 opinion.

The case went to the Supreme Court and, in 1954, a unanimous Court ruled in Brown that “in the field of public education, the doctrine of ‘separate but equal’ has no place” and “separate educational facilities are inherently unequal". The following term, the Court held additional arguments to determine how the Brown decision would be implemented. In a case that became known as Brown II, the Court decided that, rather than order immediate desegregation in public schools throughout the country and risk civil unrest and resistance, it would let local authorities come up with plans to implement the Brown decision “with all deliberate speed.”

As a result, the Briggs case went back to the Fourth Circuit, and Parker issued an opinion in 1955 that Brown only outlawed state-sponsored segregation of public schools. “The Constitution, in other words, does not require integration. It merely forbids discrimination. It does not forbid such segregation as occurs as the result of voluntary action. It merely forbids the use of governmental power to enforce segregation,” he wrote. In other words, de facto public school desegregation was okay, but de jure segregation was not.

The so-called "Parker Doctrine" became highly influential amongst judges, particularly in the South, and allowed schools to delay, evade and avoid integration. Historian Richard Kluger wrote that the Parker Doctrine "set the standard for evasiveness throughout the south" while J. Harvie Wilkinson, III, concurred, calling Parker the person who "most influenced school desegregation" in the post-Brown era. The Supreme Court would unofficially overturn the Parker Doctrine in 1968, ruling in Green v. County School Board of New Kent County, 391 U.S. 430 (1968), that school boards had an “affirmative duty” to end segregation “root and branch,” and emphasizing that “the time for mere ‘deliberate speed’ has run out.”

== Unsuccessful Supreme Court nomination ==
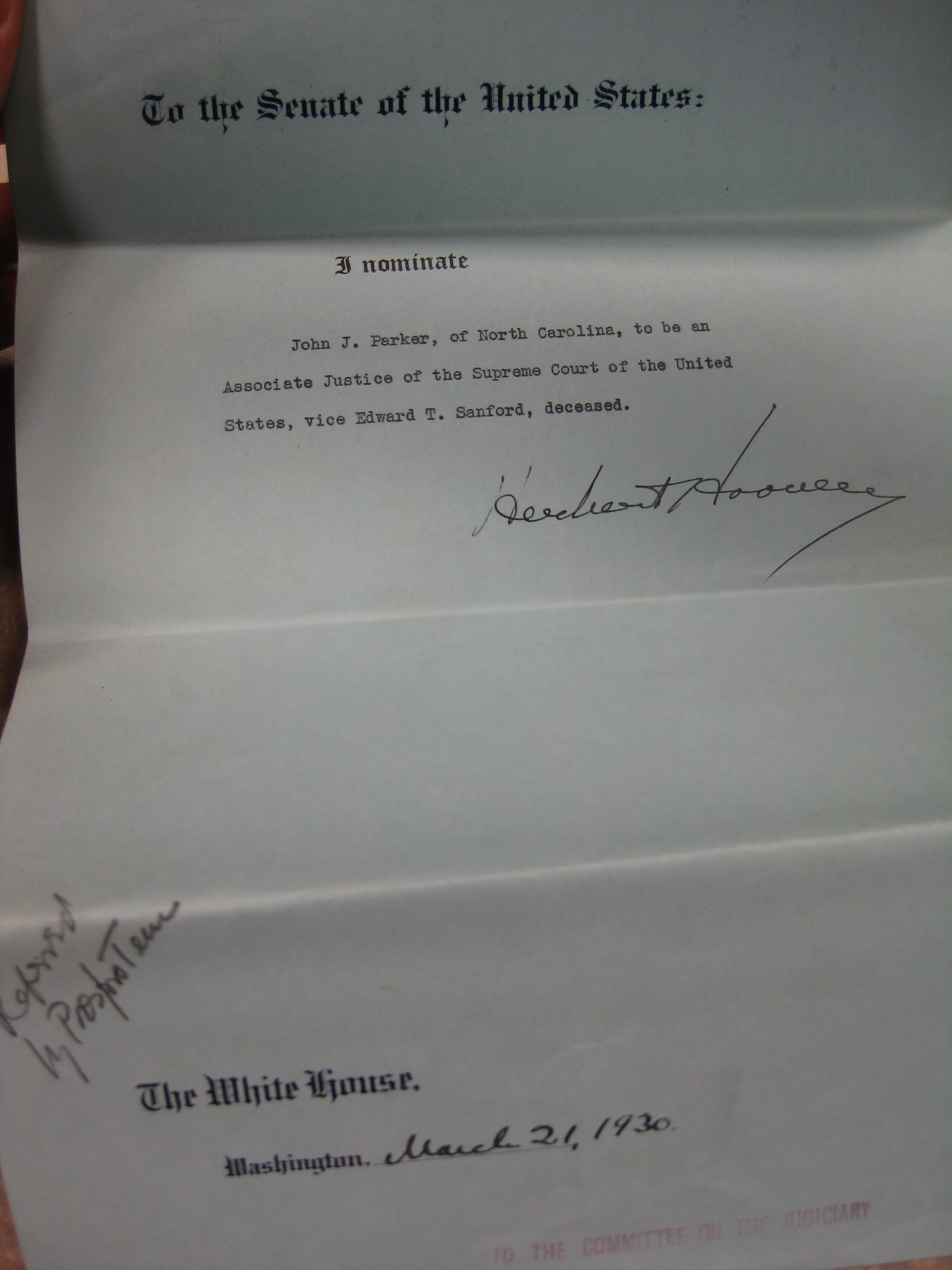
Parker's Supreme Court nomination

On March 21, 1930, Parker was nominated by President Herbert Hoover as an Associate Justice of the United States Supreme Court to fill the vacancy caused by the death of Edward Terry Sanford. His confirmation was opposed by the American Federation of Labor (AFL) and National Association for the Advancement of Colored People (NAACP) during confirmation hearings before the Senate Judiciary Committee. AFL president William Green specifically faulted Parker for a 1926 Fourth Circuit Court decision which he authored regarding the United Mine Workers, involving antitrust law and yellow-dog contracts. The NAACP joined the opposition in response to remarks Parker had made while a candidate for governor in 1920 about the participation of African Americans in the political process:

The participation of the Negro in politics is a source of evil and danger to both races and is not desired by the wise men in either race or by the Republican Party of North Carolina.

NAACP Acting Secretary Walter Francis White sent Parker a telegram asking Parker if he had been quoted correctly, and if he still held such views; Parker never replied. In response, the NAACP initiated a grassroots campaign against the nomination and White testified before the Judiciary Committee.

A group of progressive Senators led by William Borah (R-ID) and George W. Norris (R-NE) worked to defeat Parker's nomination. Borah, in particular, condemned Parker for his decision in the aforementioned 1926 case in which he upheld an injunction forbidding the UMW from unionizing workers who had signed yellow-dog contracts. A smaller number of Senators opposed Parker because of his 1920 comments. Some Southern Democrats even voted against Parker because they were concerned that confirming him would help Republicans make in-roads into the Solid South.

On April 21, 1930, the committee voted 10–6 to forward the nomination to the full Senate with an adverse recommendation. Anticipating a close vote, White sent a telegram to Vice President Charles Curtis imploring him, if the vote ended in a tie, to cast his tie-breaking vote against confirmation. On May 7, 1930, the Senate rejected Parker's nomination by a 39–41 roll call vote. This was the first Supreme Court nomination rejected by the Senate since that of Wheeler Hazard Peckham in 1894. Two days later, President Hoover nominated Owen Roberts to fill the vacancy; Roberts was swiftly confirmed on May 20, 1930.

== Later life and death ==
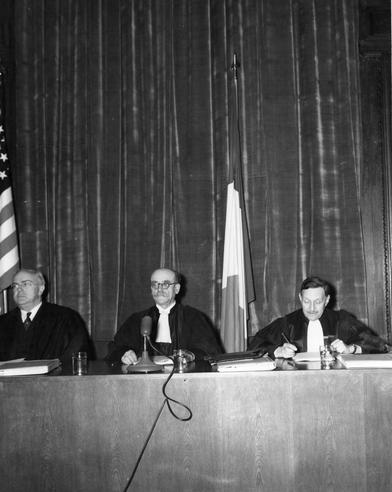
Parker (left) with two French judges during the Nuremberg Trials

From 1945 to 1946, Parker served as an alternate judge on the International Allied Military Tribunal at Nuremberg, Germany. In 1954, he was elected to serve on the United Nations' International Law Commission. Parker also served in various capacities in the American Bar Association, winning the ABA Medal in 1943 and serving as chairman of the council of the Section of Judicial Administration from 1937 to 1938. He led the Special Committee on Improving the Administration of Justice and argued for judicial reforms that would emphasize efficiency and simplicity. He also helped establish state committees (dubbed “Parker Committees”) focused on implementing the recommendations and findings of his group.

Parker died on in Washington, D.C., on March 17, 1958, while still in active judicial service. He was buried in Elmwood Cemetery in Charlotte, North Carolina.

== Legacy ==
The Judge John J. Parker Award is presented annually by the North Carolina Bar Association.

== See also ==
- Clement Haynsworth
- G. Harrold Carswell
- List of United States federal judges by longevity of service

Party political offices
| Preceded by David H. Blair | Republican nominee for Attorney General of North Carolina; 1916 | Succeeded by Herbert F. Seawell |
| Preceded by Frank A. Linney | Republican nominee for Governor of North Carolina; 1920 | Succeeded by Isaac Melson Meekins |
Legal offices
| Preceded by Charles Albert Woods | Judge of the United States Court of Appeals for the Fourth Circuit; 1925–1958 | Succeeded by Herbert Stephenson Boreman |
| New office | Chief Judge of the United States Court of Appeals for the Fourth Circuit; 1948–1958 | Succeeded by Simon Sobeloff |
