= Monroe Residential Historic District (Monroe, North Carolina) =

Historic district in North Carolina, United States

- U.S. National Register of Historic Places
- U.S. Historic district
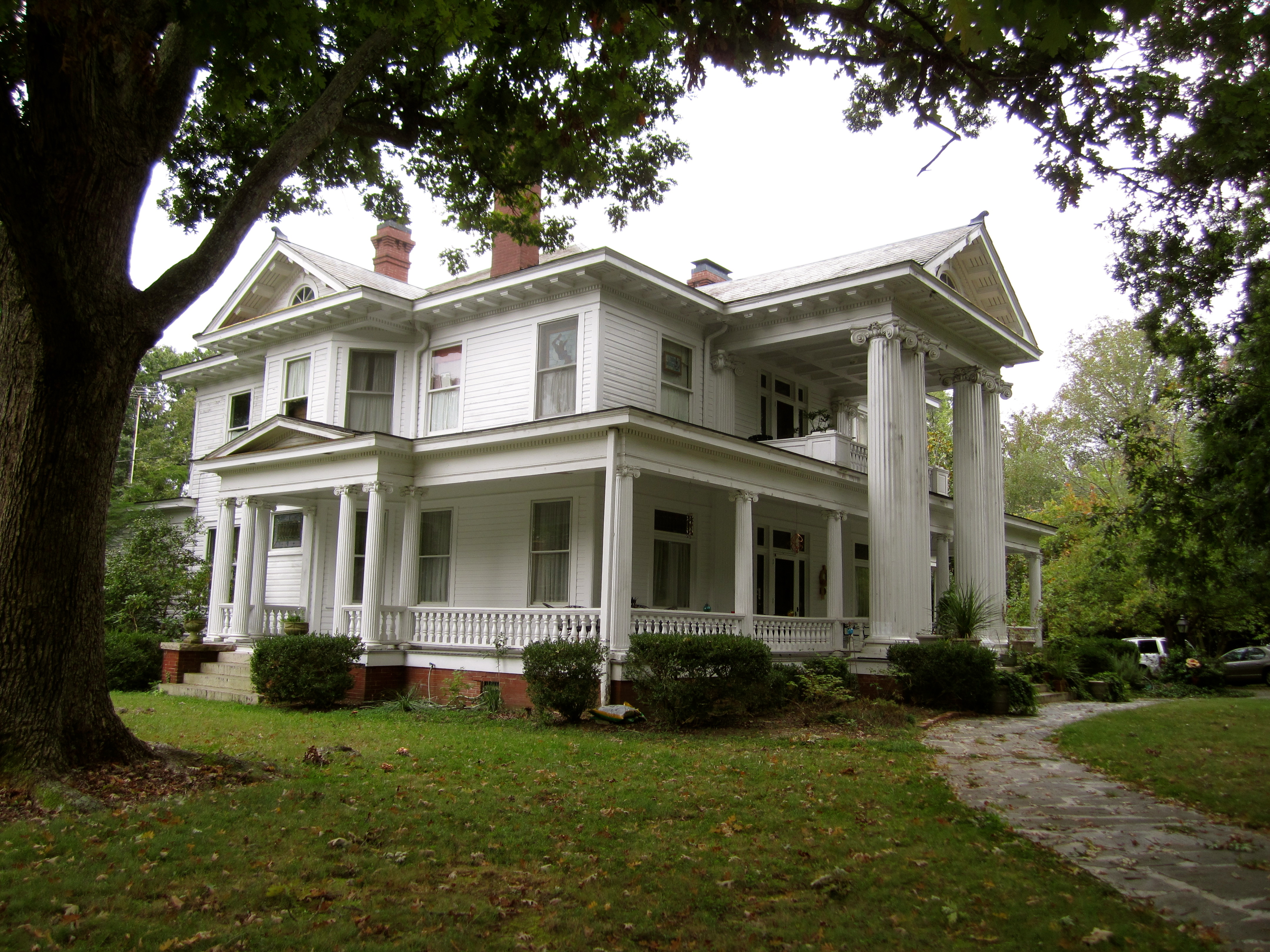
- James H. Lee House, built in 1912

- Location within North Carolina Location within the United States
- Location: Roughly bounded by Hough, Franklin, Jefferson, McCarten, Windsor, Sanford, Washington. Braden, Church & Hudson Sts., Monroe, North Carolina
- Coordinates: 34°58′45″N 80°33′01″W
- Area: 181 acres (73 ha)
- Built: 1874
- Architect: Tucker, G. Marion; Wheeler & Stern
- Architectural style: Classical Revival, Italianate, Queen Anne
- NRHP reference No.: 87002204
- Added to NRHP: January 6, 1988

The Monroe Residential Historic District is a national historic district located at Monroe, Union County, North Carolina. It encompasses 376 contributing buildings, 1 contributing site, and 4 contributing objects in a predominantly residential section of Monroe. The district developed between about 1874 and 1940 and includes notable examples of Italianate, Queen Anne, and Classical Revival architecture styles and includes work by architects Wheeler & Stern and by G. Marion Tucker. Notable buildings include the R. V. Houston House, Houston-Redfearn House, the Belk House, J. H. Lee House, M. G. Sheppard House, Elizabeth Friedeman House (c. 1880), former Methodist Parsonage (c. 1886), Gaston Meares House, William E. Cason House, M. G. Sheppard House, and George B. McClellan House.

It was listed on the National Register of Historic Places in 1988.
