= Rufus A. Doughton =

American politician

Rufus Doughton
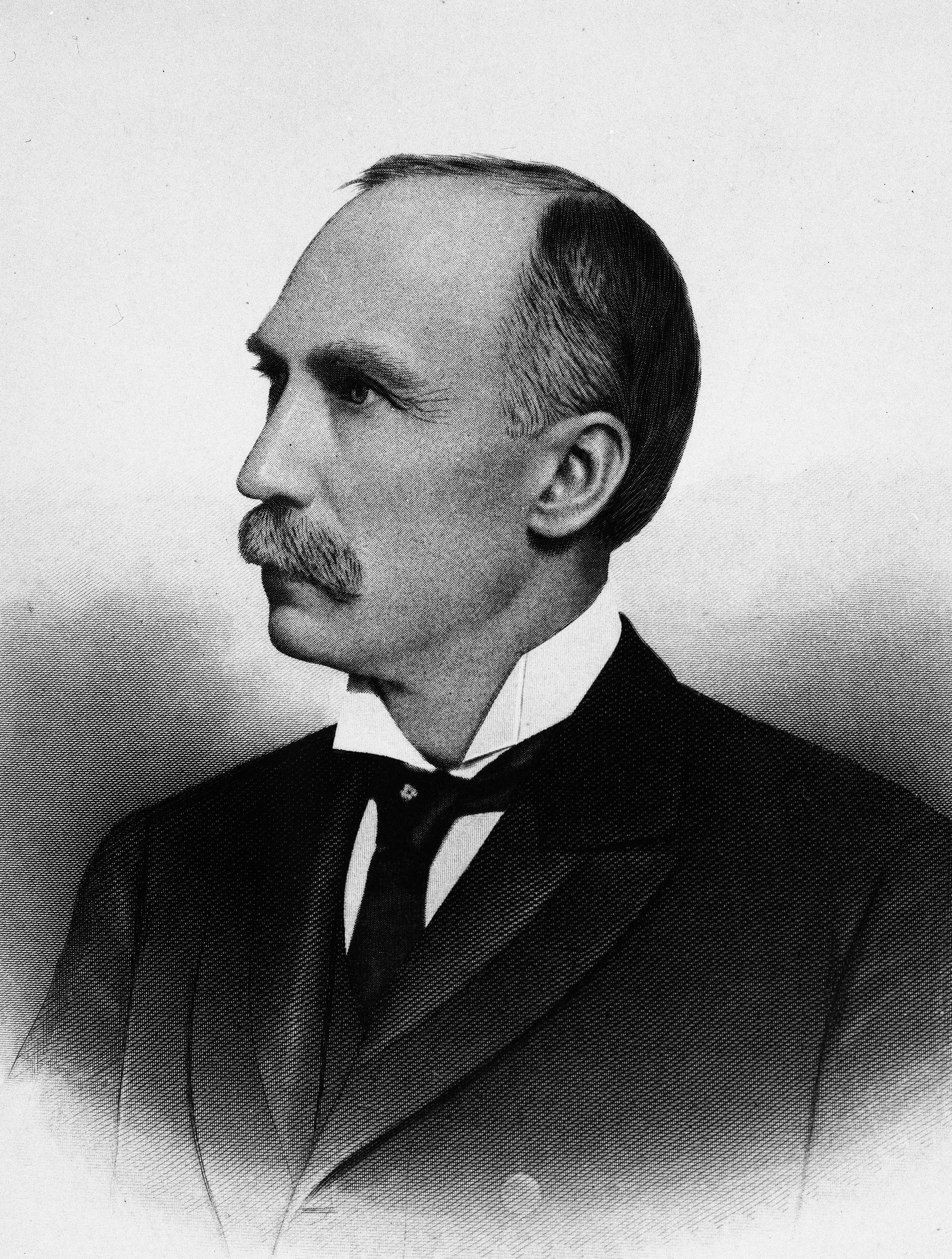

Secretary of the North Carolina Department of Revenue
- In office 1923–1929
- Governor: Cameron A. Morrison; Angus Wilton McLean
- Preceded by: A. D. Watts
- Succeeded by: Allen J. Maxwell

7th Lieutenant Governor of North Carolina
- In office 1893–1897
- Governor: Elias Carr
- Preceded by: Thomas M. Holt
- Succeeded by: Charles A. Reynolds

Speaker of the North Carolina House of Representatives
- In office 1891–1893
- Preceded by: Augustus Leazar
- Succeeded by: Lee S. Overman

Personal details
- Born: January 10, 1856
- Died: August 17, 1945 (aged 89)
- Party: Democratic
- Spouse: Sue Parks
- Relations: Robert L. Doughton (brother)
- Children: 2

Rufus A. Doughton (January 10, 1856 – August 17, 1945) was an American politician who served as a member of the North Carolina General Assembly from Alleghany County, North Carolina, and as speaker of the state House of Representatives for one term (1891).

== Early life and education ==
Doughton was one of twelve children of J.H. and Rebecca Doughton of Laurel Springs, North Carolina. All twelve went to college. Rufus attended the University of North Carolina at Chapel Hill.

== Career ==
A Democrat, he was elected and served as the seventh lieutenant governor of North Carolina from 1893 to 1897 under Governor Elias Carr. He played an important role in establishing the road system in North Carolina. In 1896, Doughton ran unsuccessfully for the U.S. House of Representatives, losing to Romulus Z. Linney.

Doughton was later elected to the state House again, serving in the 1909, 1911, and 1913 sessions. He also served as secretary of the North Carolina Department of Revenue for several periods.

== Personal life ==
Doughton's family home is now a bed and breakfast called Doughton Hall. His brother, Robert L. Doughton, served in the U.S. House of Representatives for many years (1911–1953) and helped write the Social Security Act. Robert chaired the House Ways and Means Committee for many years, longer than any other congressman. A book called Hillbilly Women includes a story of a poor woman whose family needed money to bury a relative and walked over the ridge to ask "Rufe Doughton" for help.

Doughton and his wife, Sue Parks, had two children. His son, James Kemp Doughton, also served in the state legislature and as speaker of the House.

Party political offices
Preceded by Thomas Michael Holt	Democratic nominee for Lieutenant Governor of North Carolina; 1892	Succeeded by Thomas W. Mason
