= North Carolina Department of Revenue =

North Carolina Department of Revenue (NCDOR)
- Logo of the North Carolina Department of Revenue

Agency overview
- Formed: 1921
- Headquarters: 501 North Wilmington Street, Raleigh, North Carolina
- Agency executive: Secretary of Revenue Ronald Penny
- Parent agency: North Carolina Cabinet
- Website: www.ncdor.gov

The North Carolina Department of Revenue was created in 1921 by the North Carolina General Assembly. The department is headed by a Secretary that is appointed by the Governor. The secretary is a member of the North Carolina Cabinet. Currently, the department is responsible for administering the collection of the North Carolina state income tax, gasoline tax, sales tax, beverage tax, and inheritance tax.

== History ==
When the North Carolina Constitution was rewritten after the American Civil War in 1868, the North Carolina State Tax Commission was authorized to tax trades, professions, franchises, and incomes. In 1903, the State Tax Commission recommended leaving property taxes to local authorities while income, license, franchise, and inheritance taxes would remain with the state. In 1921, the General Assembly enacted a state-administered personal and corporate income tax. As part of this new tax legislation, the assembly created the Department of Revenue to administer, enforce and collect the income tax. The department was to be led by a Commissioner of Revenue, with the inaugural commissioner to be appointed by the Governor of North Carolina to a four-year term with the advice and consent of the State Senate and, beginning in 1924, the office holder was to be chosen in statewide popular elections. In 1929 the law was altered to eliminate election of the commissioner and instead have them be appointed by the governor.

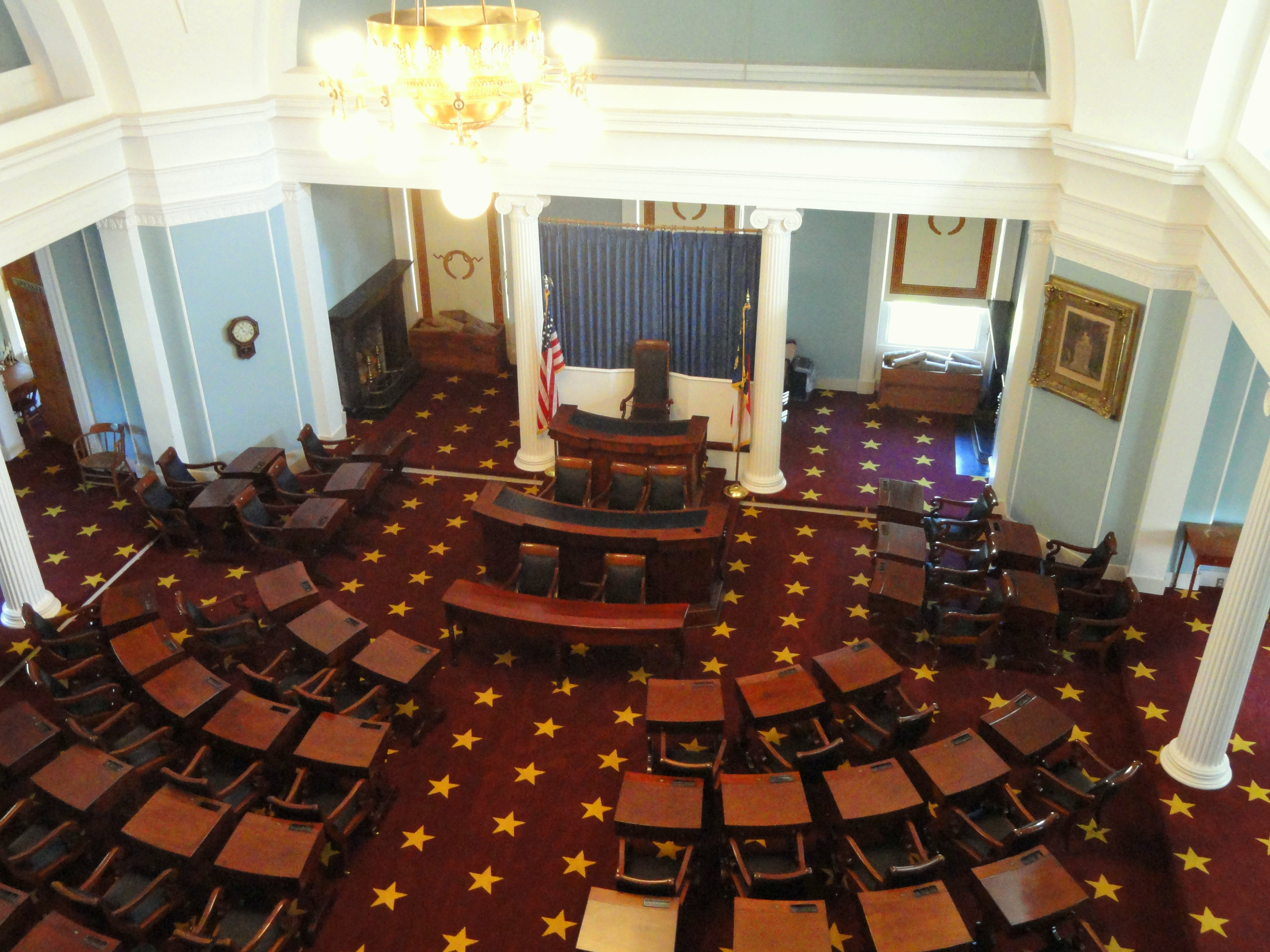
The Department of Revenue originally worked in rooms in the State Capitol, including the Senate Chamber (pictured).

At its inception, the Department of Revenue had 16 employees and worked out of the State Capitol's Senate Chamber, clerk's office and committee rooms. The department expanded over the following years and moved to different quarters as it was given new responsibilities, including management of the gasoline, licensing, and bus and truck franchise taxes and oversight of the North Carolina State Highway Patrol through a Motor Vehicle Bureau. When the financing of schools, roads, and prisons was shifted from local government to state government responsibility in the 1930s, a retail sales tax of three percent was enacted to pay for it with the Department of Revenue responsible for collecting it. The tax system under the Department of Revenue management has remained almost unchanged since then. In 1933 the State Tax Commission was abolished and its responsibility for producing a biennial report on the state's tax system was transferred to the department. In 1941 the General Assembly transformed the Motor Vehicle Bureau into an independent Department of Motor Vehicles, leaving the Department of Revenue with the responsibility of collecting the gasoline tax. The agency began using automated machinery to process individual income tax returns in 1960.

In 1971 the North Carolina General Assembly passed the Executive Reorganization Act. The law reformed the Department of Revenue to encompass the office of the commissioner of revenue, the Tax Research Board, and the State Board of Assessment. Two years later the title of the head of the department was changed from "commissioner" to "secretary". Legislation abolished the State Board of Assessment effective July 1, 1973 and directly assigned the department the responsibility of assessing the value of public utilities' property and overseeing county and municipal assessments of property under their jurisdiction. The General Assembly authorized the construction of a new headquarters in Raleigh for the department in 1986, and it was brought into use in 1992. The department was equipped with a computer system to host an integrated records database and collect and process taxes electronically in the 1990s; computerization was completed by 1997. In January 2011 a Local Government Division was created in the department to advise local governments' tax collection, auditing, and other processes.

== Structure and function ==
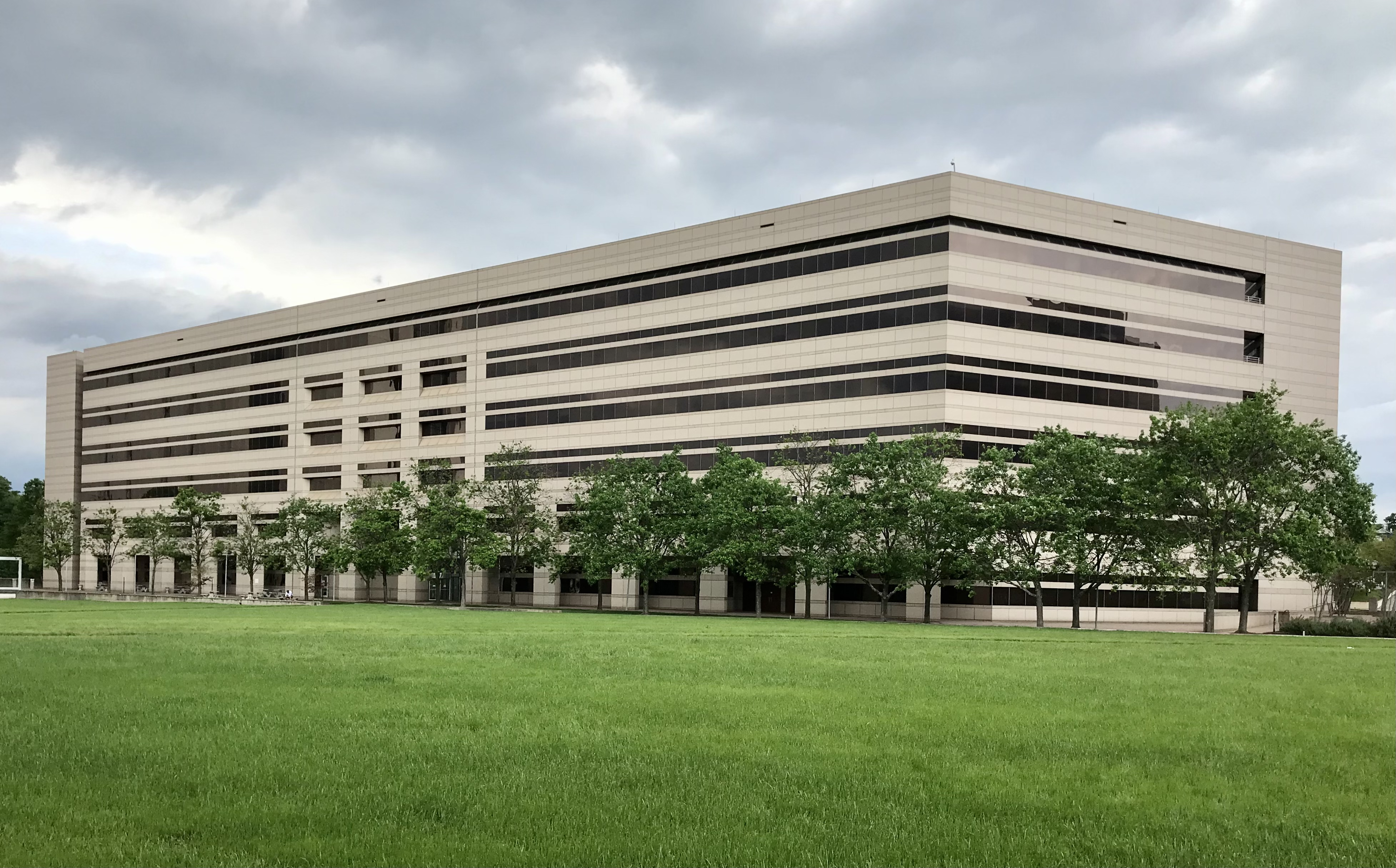
North Carolina Department of Revenue building

The Department of Revenue is an agency represented in the North Carolina Cabinet. It collects state taxes and administers tax legislation. It also researches taxation and supervises property assessing in the state. It is led by the Secretary of Revenue. Appointed by the governor, the secretary is an ex officio member of the State Tax Review Board and the North Carolina Local Government Commission. Under the secretary are a chief operating officer and five assistant secretaries. The Internal Audit Division director, a legislative liaison, public affairs director, chief financial officer, Office of the Taxpayer Advocate director, a human resources director, a general counsel, and an administrative assistant all report to the secretary. The assistant secretaries report to the chief operating officer.

The five assistant secretaries' responsibilities are defined as follows:

- Assistant Secretary for Tax Administration
  - Corporate Tax Division
  - Personal Tax Division
  - Excise Tax Division
  - Sales and Use Tax Division
  - Local Government Division
- Assistant Secretary for Business Services
  - Business Operations
  - Purchasing
  - Tax Schedule Implementation
  - Customer Service
  - Service Operations
  - Submissions Processing
  - Digital Communications
  - Service Management Applications and Testing
- Assistant Secretary for Tax Enforcement and Compliance
  - Examination Division
  - Taxpayer Assistance and Collection Division
  - Criminal Investigation Division
  - Tax Analytics Division
  - Involuntary Compliance Logistics and Operations Support Division
- Assistant Secretary and Chief Information Officer
  - IT Systems Development and Support
  - Cyber Security
  - Networking Services
  - Innovation and Continuous Delivery
  - Project Management Office
  - Technical Architecture
  - Cloud Services
- Assistant Secretary for Tax Research & Equity

As of January 2025, the department has 1,351 employees retained under the terms of the State Human Resources Act. The department's headquarters are located at 501 North Wilmington Street in Raleigh. The Excise Office, responsible for enforcing the Motor Fuels Tax, Motor Carrier Tax, Tobacco Products Tax, Privilege License Tax, and Alcoholic Beverages Tax, is housed on Terminal Drive. The department maintains other offices to serve the public in Raleigh, Asheville, Charlotte, Durham, Elizabeth City, Fayetteville, Greensboro, Greenville, Hickory, Rocky Mount, and Wilmington.

== List of secretaries and commissioners ==
The following secretaries and commissioners have held this position:

Name	Term	Appointed	Party	Home county	Governor
Ronald G. Penny	2017 to present	April 27, 2017	Democrat	Wake	Roy Cooper (Note: Ronald G. Penny served as acting Secretary from January 2017 to April 2017 and was appointed Secretary in April of 2017.)
Jeff Epstein	2016–2017	January 6, 2016	Republican	Mecklenburg	Pat McCrory
Lyons Gray	2013–2016	January 5, 2013	Republican	Forsyth	Pat McCrory
David William Hoyle	2010–2013	September 2010	Democrat	Gaston	Bev Perdue
Kenneth Lay	2009–2010		Democrat		Bev Perdue
Regionald S. Hinton	2007–2009		Democrat		Mike Easley
E. Norris Tolson	2001–2007		Democrat		Mike Easley
Muriel K. Offerman	1996–2001		Democrat		Jim Hunt
Janice Faulkner	1993–1996		Democrat		Jim Hunt
J. Ward Purrington	1992–1993		Republican		James G. Martin
Betsy Y. Justus	1990–1992		Republican		James G. Martin
Helen Ann Powers	1985–1990		Republican		James G. Martin
Mark G. Lynch	1977–1985		Democrat		Jim Hunt
Mark H. Coble	1973–1977	June 8, 1973	Republican	Guilford	James Holshouser
Gilmer Andrew Jones, Jr.	1972–1973	December 31, 1971	Democrat	Wake	Robert W. Scott
Ivie L. Clayton	1966–1971	July 8, 1966	Democrat	Wake	Dan K. Moore, Robert W. Scott (Note: Irvie L. Clayton was appointed as acting commissioner by Gov. Moore. He was later reappointed by Gov. Scott on July 21, 1969 until his resignation on December 31, 1971.)
Ivie L. Clayton	1965–1965	January 11, 1966	Democrat	Wake	Dan K. Moore
Lewis Sneed High	1964–1965	April 23, 1964	Democrat	Cumberland	Terry Sanford (Note: Lewis Sneed High was appointed by Gov. Sanford to replace William A. Johnson and served until his resignation in January 1965.)
William A. Johnson	1961–1964	January 16, 1961	Democrat	Harnett	Terry Sanford (Note: William A. Johnson was appointed by Gov. Sanford to replace James Currie and served until April 1964.)
James S. Currie	1957–1961	August 8, 1957	Democrat	Wake	Luther H. Hodges (Note: James S. Currie was appointed by Gov. Hodges to replace Eugene Shaw and served until his resignation in January 1961.)
Eugene G. Shaw	1949–1957	April 26, 1949	Democrat	Guilford	W. Kerr Scott (Note: Eugen G. Shaw was appointed by Gov. Scott to replace Gill and reappointed by Gov. Umstead on June 29, 1953.)
Edwin M. Gill	1942–1949	June 2, 1942	Democrat	Wake	J. Melville Broughton, R. Gregg Cherry (Note: Edwin M. Gill was initially appointed by Governor Broughton to replace Allen J. Maxwell and reappointed by Governor Cherry on June 14, 1945 until his resignation on July 1, 1949.)
Allen J. Maxwell	1929–1942	March 18, 1929	Democrat	Wake	Oliver Max Gardner
Rufus A. Doughton	1923–1929	January 29, 1923	Democrat	Alleghany	Cameron A. Morrison
Alston Davidson "Aus" Watts	1921–1923	May 1, 1921	Democrat	Iredell	Cameron A. Morrison

== Works cited ==
- Cheney, John L. Jr., ed. (1981). North Carolina Government, 1585-1979 : A Narrative and Statistical History (revised ed.). Raleigh: North Carolina Secretary of State. OCLC 1290270510.
- North Carolina Manual (PDF). Raleigh: North Carolina Department of the Secretary of State. 2011. OCLC 2623953. Archived from the original (PDF) on 2023-08-02.
