= 1932 United States Senate election in North Carolina =

- November 8, 1932
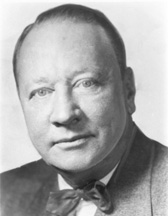

Nominee	Robert R. Reynolds	Jacob F. Newell
Party	Democratic	Republican
Popular vote	482,133	220,524
Percentage	68.62%	31.38%
Senator before election
Cameron A. Morrison
Democratic
Elected Senator
Robert Rice Reynolds
Democratic

The 1932 United States Senate election in North Carolina was held on November 8, 1932. Interim Democratic senator Cameron A. Morrison ran for election to a full term, but was defeated in the Democratic primary by Robert Rice Reynolds. Reynolds defeated Republican Jacob F. Newell in the general election.

== Background ==
Incumbent senator Lee S. Overman died on December 12, 1930. Governor of North Carolina Oliver Max Gardner appointed Cameron A. Morrison, a former governor, to fill Overman's vacant seat until a successor could be duly elected.

A special election to complete Overman's term was scheduled for the same day as the 1932 election to the next term. Primaries for both elections were held on June 4.

== Democratic primary ==
=== Candidates ===
- Thomas C. Bowie, state representative from Jefferson
- Frank D. Grist, state commissioner of labor
- Cameron A. Morrison, interim senator since 1930
- Robert Rice Reynolds, Asheville attorney and candidate for Senate in 1926
- Arthur Simmons

=== Results ===
1932 Democratic Senate primary
Party	Candidate	Votes	%
Democratic	Robert Rice Reynolds	315,316	42.33%
Democratic	Cameron A. Morrison (incumbent)	135,632	38.08%
Democratic	Thomas C. Bowie	36,414	10.22%
Democratic	Frank D. Grist	29,038	8.15%
Democratic	Arthur Simmons	4,341	1.22%
Total votes		356,188	100.00%

=== Runoff ===
1932 Democratic Senate runoff
Party	Candidate	Votes	%
Democratic	Robert Rice Reynolds	221,869	65.67%
Democratic	Cameron A. Morrison (incumbent)	116,012	34.34%
Total votes		337,881	100.00%

== Republican primary ==
=== Candidates ===
- George W. DePriest
- Jacob F. Newell

=== Results ===
1932 Republican Senate primary
Party	Candidate	Votes	%
Republican	Jacob F. Newell	29,906	86.50%
Republican	George W. DePriest	4,668	13.50%
Total votes		34,574	100.00%

== General election ==
=== Results ===
1932 U.S. Senate election in North Carolina
Party	Candidate	Votes	%	±%
Democratic	Robert Rice Reynolds	482,133	68.62%	▲8.11
Republican	Jacob F. Newell	220,524	31.38%	▼8.11
Total votes		702,657	100.00%	
