= Sara Virginia Ecker Watts Morrison =

American nurse and philanthropist

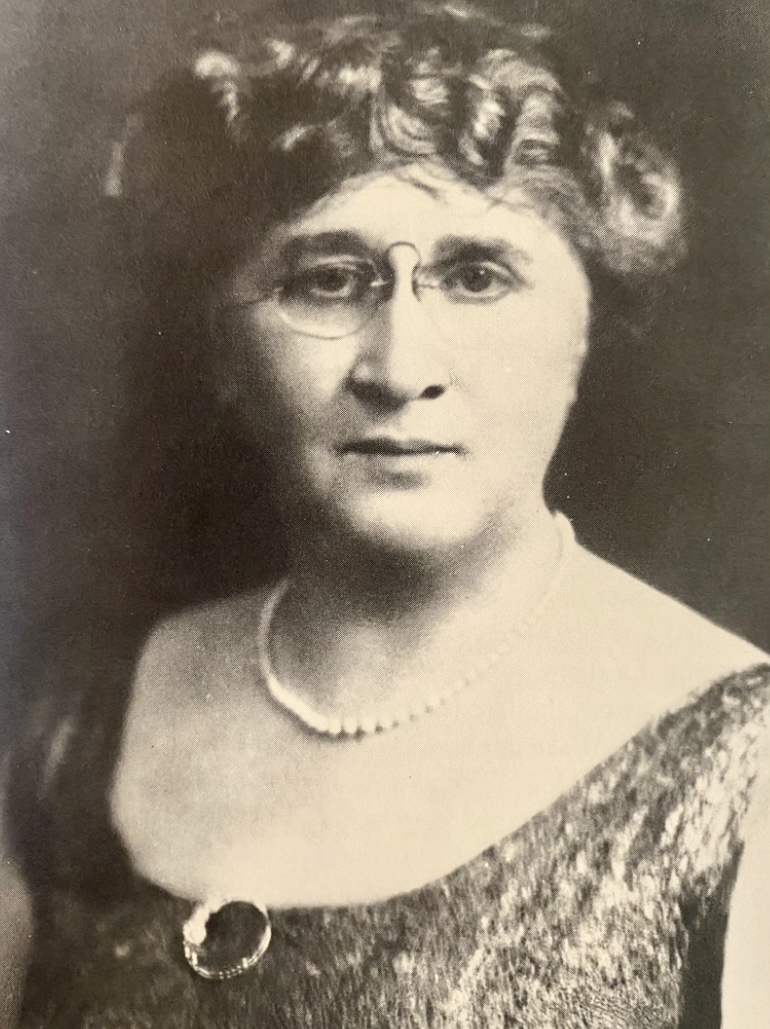

First Lady of North Carolina
- In office April 2, 1924 – January 14, 1925
- Governor: Cameron A. Morrison
- Preceded by: Angelia Lawrance Morrison
- Succeeded by: Margaret French McLean

Personal details
- Born: Sara Virginia Ecker; March 14, 1868 Belle Isle, Camillus, New York, U.S.
- Died: May 26, 1950 (aged 82) Charlotte, North Carolina, U.S.
- Resting place: Elmwood Cemetery
- Party: Democratic
- Spouse(s): George Washington Watts (1917-1921; his death); Cameron A. Morrison (m. 1924)
- Parent(s): Isaac Jesse Ecker; Mary Adelaide Scott
- Education: Johns Hopkins University
- Occupation: nurse, philanthropist

Sara Virginia Ecker Watts Morrison (March 14, 1868 – May 26, 1950) was an American nurse, heiress, philanthropist, and civic leader. She was first married to financier George Washington Watts, whom she met while working as a nurse at Johns Hopkins Hospital. Left widowed with a vast fortune in 1921, she became active in her late husband's philanthropic endeavors. She later married Cameron A. Morrison, who was serving as Governor of North Carolina, becoming First Lady of North Carolina. She served as First Lady from 1924 to 1925.

Morrison was an active patron of the Presbyterian Church and was a benefactor of Davidson College, Queens University of Charlotte, and Union Presbyterian Seminary. She endowed the Stuart Robinson School and served on the board of trustees for the Stonewall Jackson Training School. Morrison was also active in Welcome Wagon and the YWCA and served on the board of Watts Hospital, which was named after her first husband.

== Early life and education ==
Morrison was born Sara Virginia Ecker on March 14, 1868 in Belle Isle, a community within Camillus, New York near Syracuse, to Isaac Jesse Ecker and Mary Adelaide Scott. She had other siblings, including at least two sisters and one brother.

She received a nursing degree from Johns Hopkins School of Nursing.

== Career ==
=== Nursing ===
After graduating, Morrison was employed as a nurse at Johns Hopkins Hospital. While at Johns Hopkins, she met the financier George Washington Watts and his wife, Laura Valinda Beall Watts. Laura was ill, and the Watts family hired Morrison to serve as Laura's private-duty nurse at their Durham, North Carolina home, Harwood Hall. She remained employed there until Laura's death in 1916.

=== First Lady of North Carolina ===
Morrison succeeded her second husband's daughter, Angelia Lawrance Morrison, as First Lady of North Carolina and relieved the governor's sisters, Ida and Ada, from their duties in assisting the young Angelia. Her stepdaughter had assumed the public role during her father's term as Governor Morrison entered public office as a widower.

She served as the state's first lady for a short tenure of less than one year. Morrison was known as a friendly and warm hostess at the Executive Mansion. Although she had not grown up with the responsibilities of elaborate entertaining, she became accustomed to it during her first marriage.

=== Philanthropy ===
Morrison became involved in philanthropy during her first marriage and continued these endeavors throughout her life. She helped operate the Welcome Wagon service in Charlotte, which provided new homeowners with coupons from local businesses.

At the Morrocroft estate, she concerned herself with the well-being and comfort of her farm tenants and provided education for the tenants' children. She and her second husband funded scholarships for hundreds of young men and women receiving higher education. Morrison endowed the Assembly Training School, the Union Presbyterian Seminary in Richmond, Virginia, and the Stuart Robinson School in Blackey, Kentucky. She served as a member of the board of trustees for the Stonewall Jackson Training School in Concord, the YWCA in Durham and Charlotte, Queens University of Charlotte, and Watts Hospital in Durham.

Morrison provided funding for local and international missions of the Presbyterian Church and for Christian educational endeavors. The chapel at Covenant Presbyterian Church in Charlotte is named after her, as well as a building at Queens University of Charlotte.

In 1930, Davidson College presented her with the Algernon Sydney Sullivan Award for service to humanity.

== Personal life ==
Morrison married the widower George Washington Watts in 1917, becoming a member of Durham's high society. She and her husband continued to live at Harwood Hall after their wedding. She took over the managing of the house, and kept on the personal maid, Lola Allen Lewis, of Harwood Hall's former mistress. In 1917, the couple travelled to Japan for an International Sunday School convention. Upon their return home, her husband was operated on for cancer. Watts died in 1921, at which time Morrison inherited considerable wealth from his estate. She remained in Harwood Hall as a widow, then owned by her stepdaughter Annie Louise Watts Hill, and continued her late husband's philanthropic endeavors.

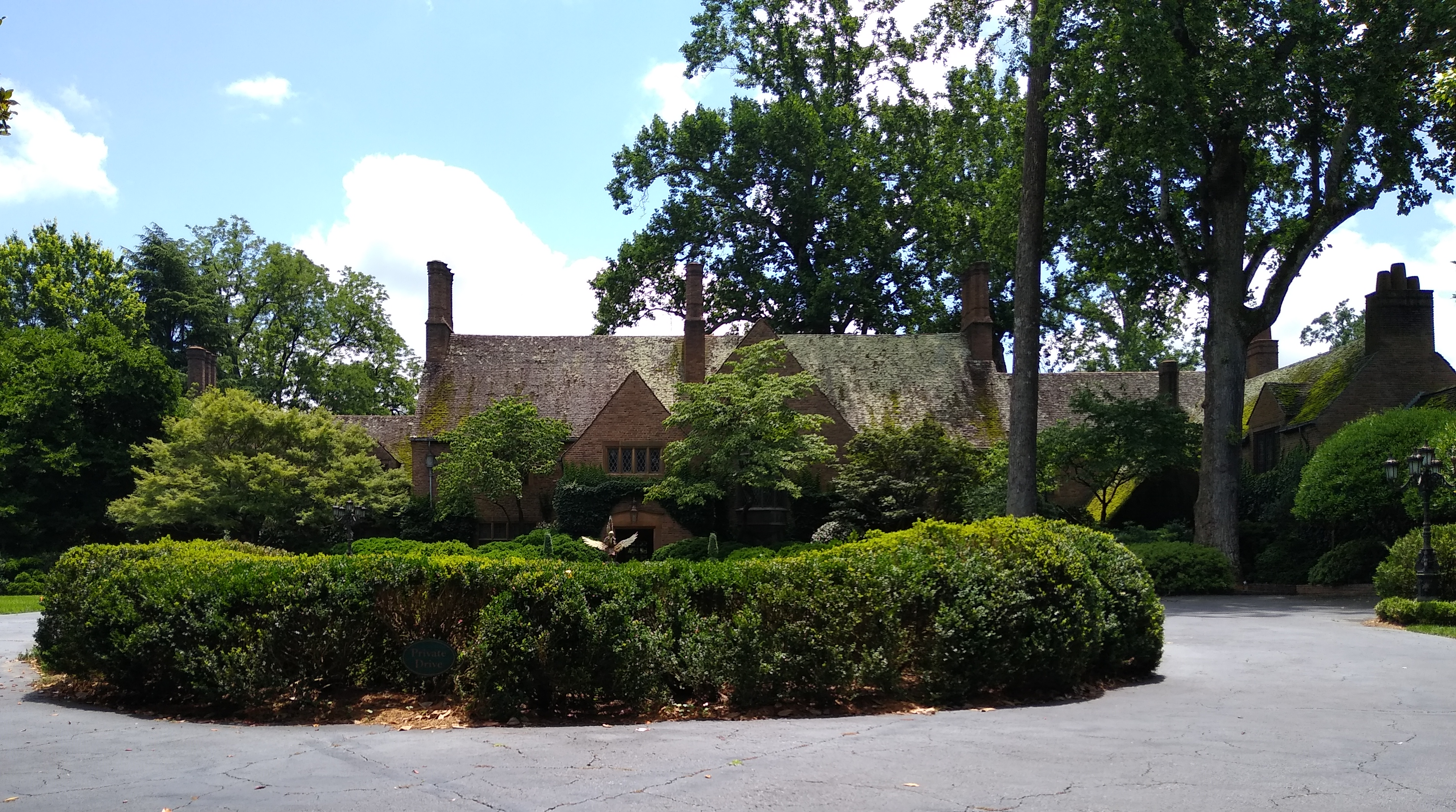
Morrocroft, the Morrison estate in Charlotte, North Carolina.

On April 2, 1924, she married a second time to the widowed politician and lawyer Cameron A. Morrison, who was serving as Governor of North Carolina. The couple married at Harwood Hall and honeymooned in New York before returning to live at the North Carolina Executive Mansion in Raleigh. Upon her marriage to Governor Morrison, she became the First Lady of North Carolina. She commissioned a portrait of her second husband's first wife, Lottie May Tomlinson Morrison, as a gift for her new stepdaughter, Angelia. Following the end of their term in the Executive Mansion, the Morrisons returned to Harwood Hall in Durham before moving back to Governor Morrison's home in the Myers Park neighborhood of Charlotte. Soon after returning to Charlotte, the couple built Morrocroft, a large estate. During this time, Governor O. Max Gardner appointed Morrison's husband to fill a vacant seat for North Carolina in the United States Senate, and the couple moved to Washington, D.C. After her husband lost a bid for election for a full term in the senate, they moved back to Morrocroft.

Morrison enjoyed needlework, gardening and reading and was an active member of the Presbyterian Church.

== Death ==
Morrison died from cancer on May 26, 1950, at her estate in Charlotte. She was buried at Elmwood Cemetery.

Honorary titles
Preceded by Angelia Lawrance Morrison	First Lady of North Carolina; 1924–1925	Succeeded by Margaret French McLean
