= Barker Ten Mile, North Carolina =

- CDP
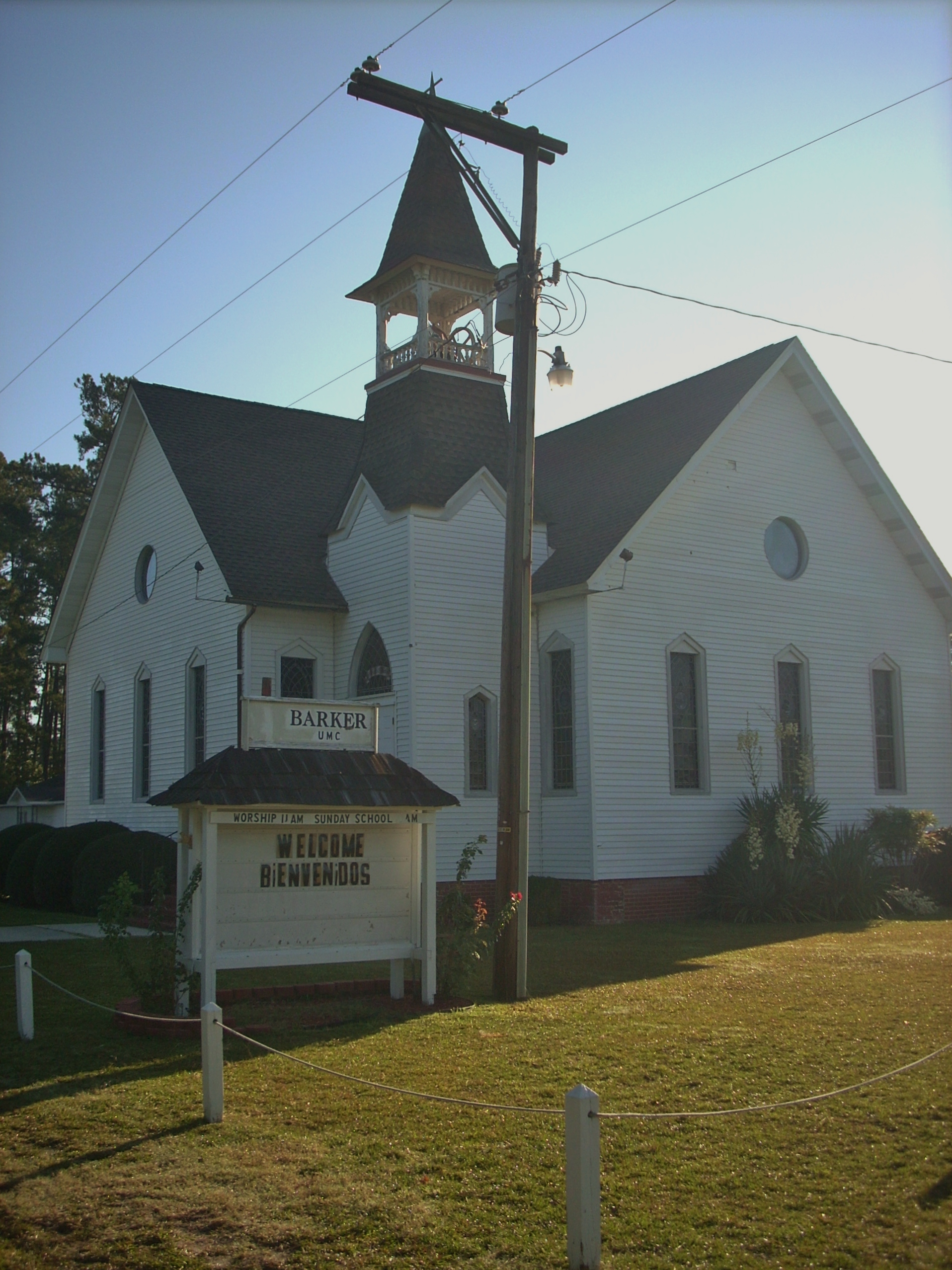
- Barker United Methodist Church

- Location within the state of North Carolina
- Coordinates: 34°40′59.6″N 78°59′49.9″W
- Country: United States
- State: North Carolina
- County: Robeson

Area
  - Total: 2.28 sq mi (5.90 km^{2})
  - Land: 2.28 sq mi (5.90 km^{2})
  - Water: 0 sq mi (0.00 km^{2})
- Elevation: 141 ft (43 m)

Population (2020)
  - Total: 937
  - Density: 411.6/sq mi (158.92/km^{2})
- Time zone: UTC-5 (EST)
  - Summer (DST): UTC-4 (EDT)
- Area codes: 910, 472
- FIPS code: 37-03665
- GNIS feature ID: 2402664

Barker Ten Mile is a census-designated place (CDP) in Robeson County, North Carolina, United States. The population was 937 at the 2020 census.

== History ==
According to local author Christopher Musselwhite, the name "Barker Ten Mile" comes from the location of the community, near Barker United Methodist Church and Ten Mile Swamp, a local waterway.

The land surrounding Barker Ten Mile includes multiple areas of local historic significance, the first being "The Meadows," which is the familial hunting grounds and horse pastures of the Goode, French, McMillan, Shepherd and Godwin families, all of whom were prominent landholders, tobacco farmers and community members. Margaret McLean, (née French) the wife of Angus Wilton Mclean, grew up in Barker Ten Mile. The collection of family land holdings originally stretched from what is now Meadowbrook Cemetery and north to Bee Gee Road and Meadow Road. From east to west, the property extended along the boundaries of Meadow Road and traversed I-95 near the current location of Robeson County Community College. Berry Godwin French, Margaret French McLean's father, was often referred to by the nickname "Bee Gee" and as such Bee Gee Road, which bisected his land, was named after him. Additionally, Barker Ten Mile is within the drainage area and immediately contains portions of Ten Mile Swamp and Saddle Tree Swamp, both of which are of cultural significance to the Lumbee. The Locklear family (Lumbee) and the Goodes (Barker Ten Mile Scot's) were known to have hunted quail frequently together at the meadow and is reflective generally of the racial attitudes of the Barker Ten Mile Scots and Saddle Tree/Barker Ten Mile Lumbee.

== Geography ==
According to the United States Census Bureau, the CDP has a total area of 2.3 square miles (6.0 km^{2}), all land.

== Demographics ==
Historical population
Census	Pop.	Note	%±
2020	937		—
U.S. Decennial Census

As of the 2010 United States census, there were 952 people living in the CDP. The racial makeup of the CDP was 67.9% White, 12.0% Black, 14.4% Native American, 2.1% Asian, 0.1% from some other race and 1.6% from two or more races. 2.0% were Hispanic or Latino of any race.

As of the census of 2000, there were 976 people, 371 households, and 303 families living in the CDP. The population density was 426.9 inhabitants per square mile (164.8/km^{2}). There were 386 housing units at an average density of 168.9 per square mile (65.2/km^{2}). The racial makeup of the CDP was 77.56% White, 12.40% African American, 7.17% Native American, 1.13% Asian, 0.10% Pacific Islander, 0.82% from other races, and 0.82% from two or more races. Hispanic or Latino of any race were 1.02% of the population.

There were 371 households, out of which 35.6% had children under the age of 18 living with them, 72.8% were married couples living together, 6.5% had a female householder with no husband present, and 18.3% were non-families. 16.2% of all households were made up of individuals, and 6.7% had someone living alone who was 65 years of age or older. The average household size was 2.63 and the average family size was 2.93.

In the CDP, the population was spread out, with 23.7% under the age of 18, 4.7% from 18 to 24, 25.9% from 25 to 44, 34.0% from 45 to 64, and 11.7% who were 65 years of age or older. The median age was 43 years. For every 100 females, there were 99.6 males. For every 100 females age 18 and over, there were 96.6 males.

The median income for a household in the CDP was $66,833, and the median income for a family was $68,693. Males had a median income of $45,278 versus $28,958 for females. The per capita income for the CDP was $33,281. None of the population or families were below the poverty line.
