= Doughton =

Doughton may refer to:

People

- Robert L. Doughton (1863–1954) North Carolina politician
- Rufus A. Doughton (1857–1946) North Carolina politician, brother of Robert
- Shannon Doughton, alias of musician Britt Walford

Places

- Doughton, Gloucestershire, England, hamlet, location of Highgrove House
- Doughton, Norfolk, England, hamlet
