= Angelia Lawrance Morrison Harris =

American political hostess

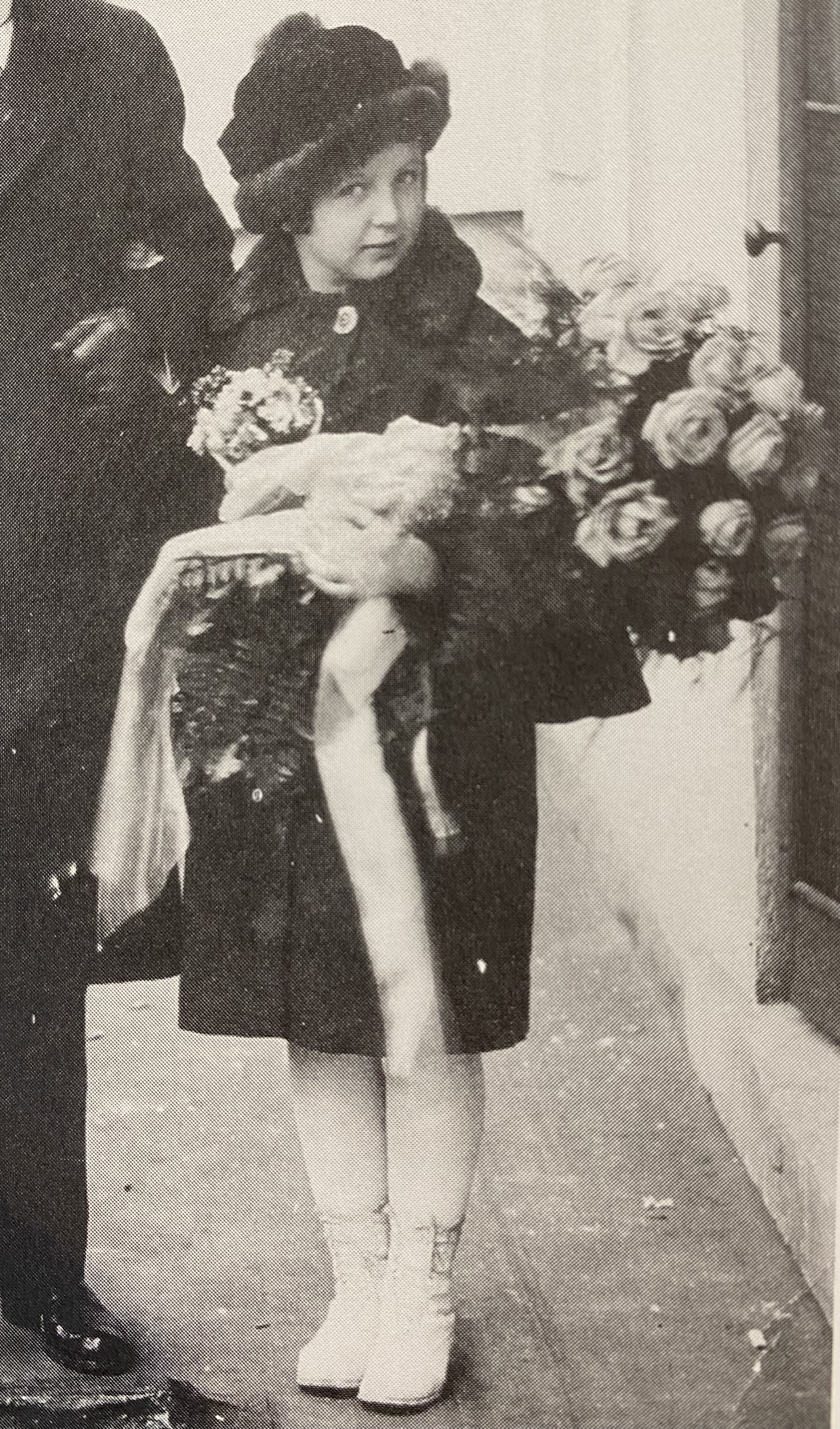
- Angelia Lawrance Morrison in 1921

Acting First Lady of North Carolina
- In office January 12, 1921 – April 2, 1924
- Governor: Cameron A. Morrison
- Preceded by: Fanny Yarborough Bickett
- Succeeded by: Sara Virginia Ecker Watts

Personal details
- Born: Angelia Lawrance Morrison; March 24, 1912 Charlotte, North Carolina, U.S.
- Died: July 13, 1983 (aged 71) Charlotte, North Carolina, U.S.
- Party: Democratic
- Spouse: James Jackson Harris
- Children: 4
- Parent(s): Cameron A. Morrison; Lottie May Tomlinson
- Education: Spence School; Sweet Briar College

Angelia Lawrance Morrison Harris (March 24, 1912 – July 13, 1983) was an American heiress, political hostess, philanthropist, and businesswoman. She served as First Lady of North Carolina during the administration of her widowed father, Governor Cameron A. Morrison, from 1921 to 1924, until her father remarried to Sara Virginia Ecker Watts. She was the second daughter of a North Carolinian governor to serve as First Lady during his term, after Helen Whitaker Fowle Knight. Throughout the Morrison administration, she was known as the "little mistress of the mansion." In her later life, she lived at her Charlotte estate, Morrocroft, and operated an antique business. Harris was a benefactor of multiple institutions including Queens College, St. Andrews Presbyterian College, and the Mint Museum, and was appointed by Governor Dan K. Moore to serve on the North Carolina Executive Mansion Fine Arts Commission.

== Early life ==
Angelia Lawrance Morrison was born in Charlotte, North Carolina on March 24, 1912, to Cameron A. Morrison, a lawyer, and Lottie May Tomlinson Morrison. She was the only one of her parents' four children to survive infancy. Her mother died in 1919.

=== First Lady of North Carolina ===
Harris' father was later elected as Governor of North Carolina and was inaugurated on January 12, 1921. Harris accompanied her father, his two sisters Ada Morrison Nuttall and Ida Morrison, and three hundred residents of Charlotte on a train to Raleigh for the ceremony. She was by her father's side throughout the day's events, from breakfast that morning to the governor's ball that evening, and was the center of attention.

She arrived, with her father, at the North Carolina Executive Mansion in a limousine and, upon exiting the car, ran up the steps to the mansion to hug and kiss the outgoing Governor and First Lady, Thomas Walter Bickett and Fanny Yarborough Bickett. After the meeting at the mansion, she attended the governor's inauguration ceremony at Raleigh Memorial Auditorium, arriving on the arms of her father and Governor Bickett. Harris wore a brown velvet dress, coat and hat with matching kid gloves, and a corsage of sweet peas and lilies of the valley for the occasion. Following the ceremony, her father handed her a bouquet of American Beauty roses that was presented to him by a group of women from Charlotte.

Harris stood with her father in the evening after the inauguration to receive guests at receptions hosted at both the Woman's Club of Raleigh and the North Carolina Executive Mansion. The Charlotte Observer reported that she wore "an exquisite frock of soft white silk and lace with her hair tied with a big white satin bow and slippers and stockings of white" and a "corsage of white rosebuds and lilies of the valley." The paper went on to describe Harris as "resplendent almost in every detail" and reported that she was almost "the central figure.. on the car, on the stage, at the lunch, and in the receiving line at the ball" and stated that "the state likes Angelia and it welcomed her with courtesies probably exceeding any ever accorded a child of Carolina."

At the executive mansion, Harris lived in a room that had been decorated for her by former First Lady Bickett. As her father was widowed, she became the official First Lady of North Carolina, assisted in her duties by her two aunts who came with them to Raleigh. As first lady, Harris accompanied her father as often as possible to events and public engagements throughout the state and participated in a variety of activities. When Governor Morrison would travel out of state, he always brought gifts back for her, usually red clothing.

Harris remained first lady until her father remarried, on April 2, 1924, to the heiress Sara Virginia Ecker Watts. She accompanied her father to the wedding ceremony at Harwood Hall, which had been Watts' home during her first marriage to George Washington Watts. Her stepmother, as the new first lady, commissioned a portrait of Harris' late mother as a present for her. Towards the end of her father's term as governor, she left the mansion with her aunt, Ida, and returned to the family's home in Charlotte.

== Later life ==
Harris attended The Spence School in New York City and graduated from Sweet Briar College in Virginia.

In October 1932, she married James Jackson Harris, with whom she had four children: James Jackson Harris Jr.; Sara Harris Bissell; Cameron Morrison Harris; and John William Harris. Upon the death of her father in 1953, she inherited the Charlotte estate Morrocroft, which her father and stepmother had built.

In 1964, she opened and operated a successful antique business in Charlotte. In 1967, at the behest of First Lady Jeanelle C. Moore, she was appointed by Governor Dan K. Moore to serve as a member of the Executive Mansion Fine Arts Commission. She was active in many organizations, including the Charlotte Debutante Club, and was a parishioner at Covenant Presbyterian Church. Harris was a benefactor to Queen's College, St. Andrews Presbyterian College, the Mint Museum, and Charlotte Country Day School.

Harris died on July 13, 1983, aged 71. Following her death, her children had ginkgo trees planted along Ballantyne Commons Parkway in Charlotte in her memory.

Honorary titles
Preceded by Fanny Yarborough Bickett	First Lady of North Carolina; 1921–1924	Succeeded by Sara Virginia Ecker Watts
