= Robert R. Reynolds =

American politician (1884–1963)

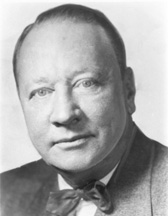

United States Senator from North Carolina
- In office December 5, 1932 – January 3, 1945
- Preceded by: Cameron A. Morrison
- Succeeded by: Clyde R. Hoey

Personal details
- Born: June 18, 1884 Asheville, North Carolina, US
- Died: February 13, 1963 (aged 78) Asheville, North Carolina
- Party: Democratic
- Spouses: Frances Jackson (m. 1910; died 1913) Mary Bland (m. 1914; div. 1917) Denise D'Arcy (m. 1921; div. 1929) Eva Brady (m. 1931; died 1934) Evalyn W. McLean (m. 1941; died 1946)
- Children: 4
- Education: University of North Carolina; UNC Law School

Robert Rice Reynolds (June 18, 1884 – February 13, 1963) was an American attorney, businessman, travel writer, newspaper publisher, and Democratic Party politician who represented North Carolina in the United States Senate from 1932 to 1945.

As senator, Reynolds was distinct as a passionate isolationist and became increasingly notorious as an apologist for Nazi Germany. Even after the United States entered World War II on the side of the Allies, Reynolds was accused of collaborating with fascist propagandists including Gerald L. K. Smith, through his antisemitic newspaper The Defender and free access to his franking privileges. Despite opposition from President Franklin D. Roosevelt, Reynolds was re-elected to a second term in the Senate in 1938. However, he was denied party support for re-election in 1944 and retired from the Senate. In his final run for office in 1960, he finished a distant third in the Democratic Party primary.

== Early life and education ==
Robert Rice Reynolds was born on June 18, 1884, in Asheville, North Carolina, at his family's large estate. He was the son of William Taswell Reynolds (1850–1892) and Mamie Elizabeth Spears (1862–1939). He was descended from a family of Revolutionary War heroes and pioneers, politicians, and property owners, including his maternal great-grandfather, Colonel Daniel Smith, a Revolutionary War hero of the Battle of Kings Mountain. His siblings included George Spears Reynolds (1881–1924) and Jane Reynolds Wood (1888–1927).

Reynolds attended public and private schools, including Weaver College, a preparatory school, before entering the University of North Carolina at Chapel Hill. While at UNC, he played football, ran track, and was the editor of the sports section of The Daily Tar Heel. He left UNC without a degree but was still accepted at the University of North Carolina School of Law. He did not officially enroll but attended lectures and was eventually admitted to the North Carolina bar in 1908.

== Early career ==
After passing the bar exam in 1908, Reynolds began practicing law in Asheville with his brother George. He was elected prosecuting attorney, serving from 1910 to 1914, and during World War I, registered for military service. He was never drafted but briefly served in the National Guard. In 1924, he ran for Lieutenant Governor of North Carolina, losing to J. Elmer Long in the Democratic primary.

He wrote the book Gypsy Trails, Around the World in an Automobile; Asheville, NC: Advocate Publishing Company (presumed date 1923).

== U.S. Senate ==
In 1926, Reynolds made his first campaign for United States Senate but lost the Democratic Party primary to incumbent Lee S. Overman. He ran again in 1932 and defeated Cameron A. Morrison in the Democratic primary by a margin of nearly two-to-one after a populist campaign, in which he accused Morrison of being a communist sympathizer. During one 1932 campaign speech, he proclaimed, "Cam likes fish eggs, and Red Russian fish eggs at that. Don't you want a Senator who likes North Carolina hen eggs?"

During his first term, Reynolds supported the New Deal and believed that it provided much-needed jobs for North Carolinians, including through the construction of the Blue Ridge Parkway and establishment of Great Smoky Mountains National Park. Reynolds favored taxes on the wealthy, economic regulation, and welfare spending programs, including the Social Security Act, the Fair Labor Standards Act of 1938, and the Agricultural Adjustment Act (which raised tobacco prices to the benefit of North Carolina farmers and laborers) and the establishment of the Works Progress Administration and Tennessee Valley Authority. Reynolds initially supported the Judicial Procedures Reform Bill of 1937 to pack the Supreme Court, but he later joined other Democrats in sending the bill back to the Judiciary Committee for extensive revisions, stripping it of its effects on the Supreme Court.

While Reynolds generally supported Roosevelt's domestic program, he distinguished himself from the president and his party for his opposition to immigration and, particularly unique among senators from the South, foreign intervention. Reynolds advocated for a "Fortress America" policy and a strong national defense, including expansion of the United States Armed Forces, but sharply and vocally opposed efforts to revise the Neutrality Acts. Reynolds and John H. Overton of Louisiana were the only southern senators to vote against the repeal of the arms embargo. In response, Roosevelt recruited U.S. representative Franklin Wills Hancock Jr. to oppose Reynolds in the 1938 Democratic primary, as part of Roosevelt's efforts to purge the Democratic Party of his strongest opponents, but Reynolds won handily.

During his second term, even during World War II, Reynolds doubled down on his opposition to foreign aid, American military intervention, and sympathy for American and European fascism. In 1939, as an opponent of immigration, Reynolds spoke out against the Wagner–Rogers Bill, which proposed to raise immigration quotas to accept 20,000 Jewish refugee children fleeing Nazi Germany. He elicited praise in Social Justice, the newspaper published by the antisemitic Catholic priest Charles Coughlin. He further called for a 10-year ban on all immigration to the United States and said that "the time has come for changing the tradition that the U.S.A. is an asylum for the oppressed." He referred to newly-arrived immigrants as "millions of foreigners who are about to begin the rape of this country" and called for their deportation or detention in concentration camps.

During his second term, Reynolds openly praised Nazi Germany and worked with American fascists Gerald L. K. Smith and George Sylvester Viereck. In 1941, Reynolds was elevated to chair of the Senate Committee on Military Affairs. In late 1941, he reversed his pro-fascist and pro-German positions following the attack on Pearl Harbor and the German declaration of war on the United States and introduced a bill to extend the Selective Training and Service Act of 1940. However, the British Foreign Office remained suspicious of Reynolds's loyalties during the war. In 1943, Isaiah Berlin stated in a confidential Foreign Office analysis of the United States Senate Committee on Foreign Relations:

[Reynolds] is exceptional among Southerners, in that he is a bitter Isolationist of a disreputable kind. His Anglophobia is proverbial and his journal The Vindicator is a low-grade Fascist sheet. He is distrusted by the majority of his colleagues and his assumption of the chairmanship of the Military Affairs Committee (by seniority) was universally regarded as disastrous outside his own circle of chauvinist demagogues. His State produces cotton and tobacco and he, therefore, votes for reciprocal trade pacts.

In the 1944 election, the Democratic Party chose former North Carolina governor Clyde R. Hoey to seek Reynolds's seat in the primary. Reynolds did not seek reelection. Reynolds sought to return to the Senate in the 1950 election, but he was by then hopelessly discredited and won only 10 percent of the vote in the Democratic primary, behind Frank Porter Graham and Willis Smith.

== Later life ==
After leaving public life, Reynolds practiced law and real estate until his death, in Asheville.

== Personal life ==
=== Marriages and children ===
Reynolds married five times throughout his life and had four children. His first marriage was in 1910 to Frances Jackson (1889–1913). Before her death from typhoid fever in 1913, they had two children together:

- Frances Jackson Reynolds (1910–1955)
- Robert Rice Reynolds, Jr. (1913–1950)

In 1914, he married 17-year-old Mary Bland (b. 1897). Less than a year after their marriage, he left his new wife and their child. Before their divorce in 1917 and her three subsequent marriages, they had one daughter together:

- Mary Bland Reynolds, who died of Hodgkin's disease.

In 1921, he married, for the third time, Denise D'Arcy, a French woman he met in New York. Reynolds met D'Arcy while he was traveling around the country in his truck and accidentally struck her as she crossed the street. Within five days, he had announced that they had fallen in love and were going to get married. The marriage dissolved after one year, and D'Arcy obtained a legal separation from Reynolds in 1922 and moved back to France. The divorce was ultimately finalized in 1929.

On February 27, 1931, he married for the fourth time to Eva Brady (1898–1934), a former Ziegfeld Follies dancer from Chicago, who came to Asheville looking for a cure for tuberculosis. Eva died on December 13, 1934.

On October 9, 1941, 57-year-old Reynolds married for the fifth and final time to 19-year-old Evalyn Washington McLean (1921–1946), daughter of Edward B. McLean, the former publisher and owner of The Washington Post, and Evalyn Walsh McLean, owner of the Hope Diamond. Together, they had one daughter:

- Mamie Spears Reynolds (1942–2014), an owner and driver for the Reynolds Racing Team of Asheville, the first woman to qualify for the Daytona 500, and co-owner of the ABA Kentucky Colonels professional basketball team. In 1963, she married Luigi "Coco" Chinetti Jr., son of Italian racecar driver and Ferrari agent Luigi Chinetti, and divorced two years later.

On September 20, 1946, his wife, Evalyn, died of an accidental overdose of sleeping pills, which some believe is a result of the Hope Diamond curse..

=== Death ===
Reynolds died of cancer on February 13, 1963, at Reynolds House, in Asheville.

== Publications ==
- Reynolds, Robert Rice (1913). Wanderlust: A Journey Through Wanderlust. [n.p.]

Party political offices
Preceded by Lee Slater Overman	Democratic nominee for U.S. Senator from North Carolina (Class 3); 1932, 1938	Succeeded by Clyde R. Hoey
U.S. Senate
Preceded by Cameron A. Morrison	U.S. senator (Class 3) from North Carolina; December 5, 1932 – January 3, 1945; Served alongside: Josiah William Bailey	Succeeded by Clyde R. Hoey
