= Fanny Yarborough Bickett =

American political hostess and social worker

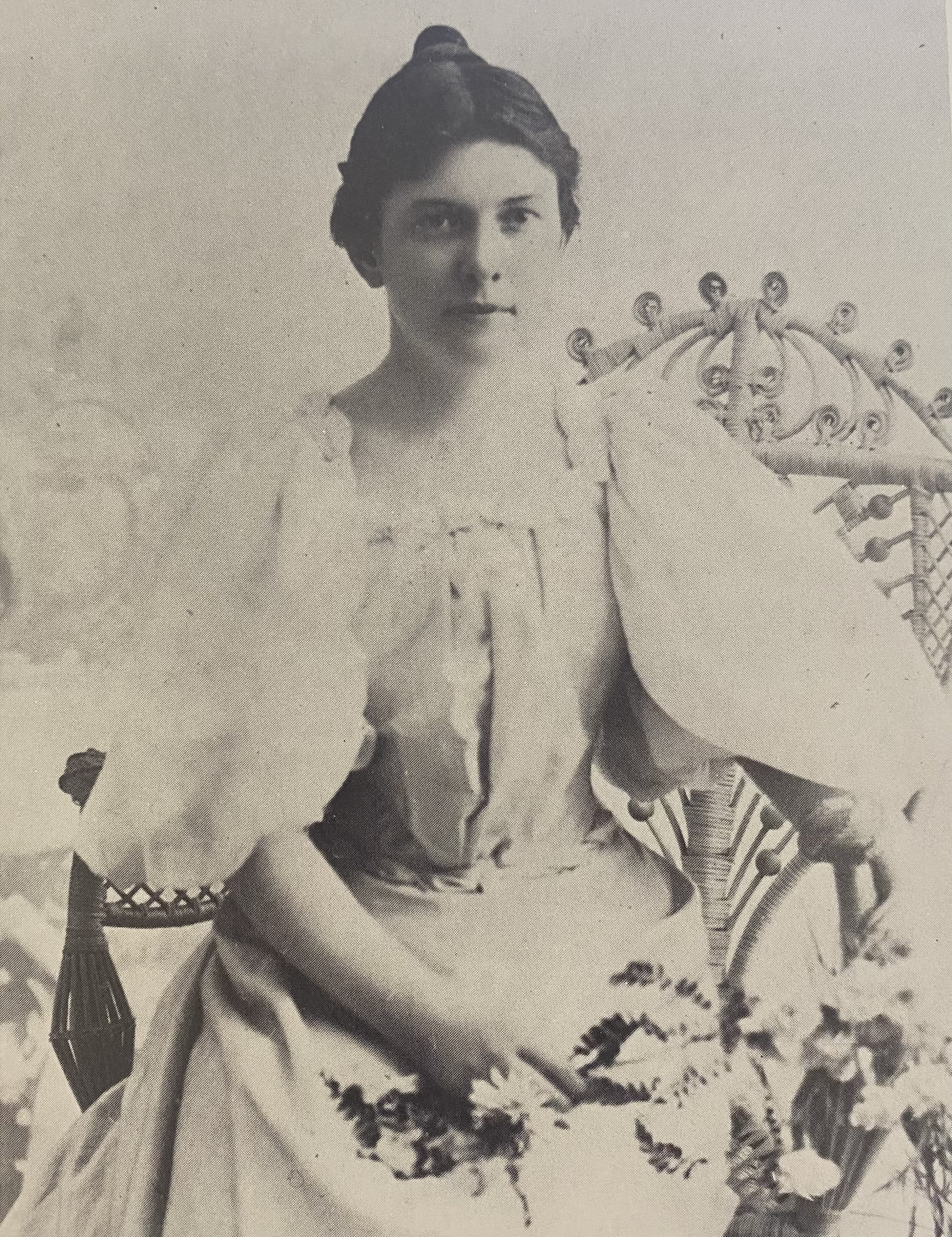

President of the North Carolina Railroad
- In role 1929–1933
- Governor: Oliver Max Gardner
- Succeeded by: Cora Lily Woodard Aycock

Wake County Superintendent of Public Welfare
- In role 1924–unknown

Head of the Infant and Maternal Welfare Bureau of the State Department of Health
- In role 1922–1924
- Governor: Cameron A. Morrison

First Lady of North Carolina
- In role 1917–1921
- Governor: Thomas Walter Bickett
- Preceded by: Annie Burgin Craig
- Succeeded by: Angelia Lawrance Morrison

Personal details
- Born: Fanny Neal Yarborough; October 11, 1870 Louisburg, North Carolina, U.S.
- Died: July 3, 1941 (aged 70) Raleigh, North Carolina, U.S.
- Resting place: Oak Lawn Memorial Cemetery
- Party: Democratic
- Spouse: Thomas Walter Bickett
- Children: 3
- Parent(s): William Henry Yarborough; Lucy Massenburg Davis
- Education: Louisburg College; St. Mary's Junior College; University of Chicago; Harvard University; UNC Chapel Hill; Wake Forest University
- Occupation: social worker, political hostess, lobbyist, lawyer

Fanny Neal Yarborough Bickett (Note: Also spelled "Fannie") (October 11, 1870 – July 3, 1941) was an American social worker, public official, lawyer, and lobbyist. She served as the First Lady of North Carolina from 1917 to 1921, as the wife of Governor Thomas W. Bickett, and used her influence in his administration to enact social reforms and support women's suffrage. During World War I, she maintained a victory garden at the North Carolina Executive Mansion and promoted home gardens to support the war effort. Bickett was the commandant of the Southeastern District of the U.S. Training Corps and visited American troops in France as a representative of the YMCA.

After serving as first lady, Bickett served in various civic roles, including as a member of the board of governors of the North Carolina School for the Blind and Deaf, as the Head of the Infant and Maternal Welfare Bureau of the North Carolina State Department of Health, and as the Superintendent of Public Welfare for Wake County. In 1929, she was appointed by Governor O. Max Gardner as the first woman president of the North Carolina Railroad. She was a national officer of the Colonial Dames of America and an active member of the Daughters of the American Revolution and the United Daughters of the Confederacy. In her later life, she earned a law degree from Wake Forest University and passed the state bar.

== Early life and education ==
Bickett was born Fanny Neal Yarborough on October 11, 1870, at Rose Hill, her family's plantation in Franklin County. Her father, Colonel William Henry Yarborough, was a planter and former officer in the Confederate States Army. Her mother, Lucy "Lula" Massenburg Davis Yarborough, died when she was three years old. Her father raised her with the help of an aunt, Fannie Yarborough Neal of Louisburg, North Carolina, for whom she was named.

Bickett was educated by private governesses at home before enrolling at Louisburg College. In 1889, she graduated from St. Mary's Junior College in Raleigh and went on to study at the University of Chicago and Harvard University. In her later life, she studied at the University of North Carolina at Chapel Hill and, following her husband's death, she attended Wake Forest University School of Law and passed the state bar.

== Career and public life ==
Bickett became First Lady of North Carolina in 1917, upon the election of her husband, Thomas Walter Bickett, as the 54th Governor of the state. She was among the most formally educated first ladies and one of the first to have a separate profession. She pioneered efforts for public assistance and was a lobbyist for the development of North Carolina's welfare system. Due to her influence, her husband's administration introduced social reforms including the establishment of juvenile courts, stricter regulations regarding the employment of minors, better treatment and living conditions for incarcerated people, and an increase in public health services.

When she and her husband moved into the North Carolina Executive Mansion, she brought her own household staff from Louisburg. She employed the architect James Salter to conduct a complete inspection of the North Carolina Executive Mansion, and supported his suggestions to improve the building, forwarding the request to the North Carolina General Assembly's Joint Committee on Public Buildings and Grounds. The initial request for $65,000 to fund renovations did not pass in the general assembly, but a measure enacted in March 1917 for $4,000 was granted, and a subsequent allocation of another $4,000 in 1919 went towards renovation costs. In 1920, Bickett had the second-floor ballroom converted into a bedroom, bathroom, closets, and a corridor to connect other family bedrooms together. She purchased dining room furniture, a four-poster bed for the mansion's guest room, and a consul table with a mirror for the grand hallway.

In 1917, she hosted students and faculty from the East Carolina Teachers Training School at the North Carolina Executive Mansion.

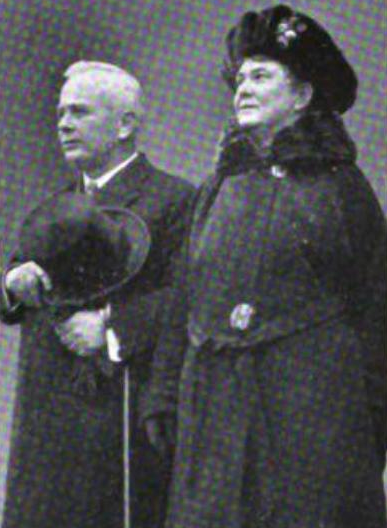
Bickett with her husband during his governorship

During World War I, Bickett promoted home gardens to aid in the war effort, and maintained a victory garden at the governor's mansion. She was actively involved in the Young Men's Christian Association and the Young Women's Christian Association and, in 1918, visited American troops in France as a representative of the YMCA. Bickett provided housing for soldiers passing through Raleigh during the war, allowing them to stay at the governor's mansion, setting up sixty cots in the ballroom. She worked with the Army Reserve Officers' Training Corps to improve the physical conditions of women working in war offices and in war-related capacities. Bickett was the commandant of the Southeastern District of the Training Corps, serving for several summers at a camp near Asheville.

In 1920, Bickett and her husband appeared before a joint session of the North Carolina State Senate and the North Carolina House of Representatives in support of women's suffrage. Less than a year after her husband's term as governor ended, he died in December 1921. Shortly after his death, Bickett became the head of the Infant and Maternal Welfare Bureau of the State Department of Health, serving in this capacity until 1924. In 1924, she became the Superintendent of Public Welfare for Wake County. She was known to have progressive views on racial policy, and hired several African-American people for professional and clerical positions in her office.

In 1929, Bickett was appointed by Governor O. Max Gardner as the first female president of the North Carolina Railroad. She was later succeeded by former First Lady Cora Lily Woodard Aycock in 1933. Bickett was also a member of the board of the North Carolina School for the Blind and Deaf.

Bickett was a national officer of the Colonial Dames of America and was an active member of the Daughters of the American Revolution and the United Daughters of the Confederacy.

== Personal life and death ==
On November 29, 1898, she married Thomas Walter Bickett, a country lawyer whom she met in Louisburg. They had three children: William Yarborough Bickett, Thomas Walter Bickett, Jr., and Mary Covington Bickett.

Bickett was Episcopalian and was an active parishioner at Christ Church in Raleigh.

She died on July 2, 1941, at Rex Hospital, following a heart attack. Her funeral was held at Christ Church. She was buried beside her husband at Oak Lawn Memorial Cemetery in Louisburg.

== Notes ==
Honorary titles
Preceded by Annie Burgin Craig	First Lady of North Carolina; 1917–1921	Succeeded by Angelia Lawrance Morrison
