= Governor McLean =

Governor McLean may refer to:

- Angus Wilton McLean (1870–1935), 56th Governor of North Carolina
- Fitzroy J. Grafton McLean (fl. 1800s–1810s), Governor of St. Thomas, St. John from 1807 to 1815
- George P. McLean (1857–1932), 59th Governor of Connecticut
