= Margaret French McLean =

American civic leader

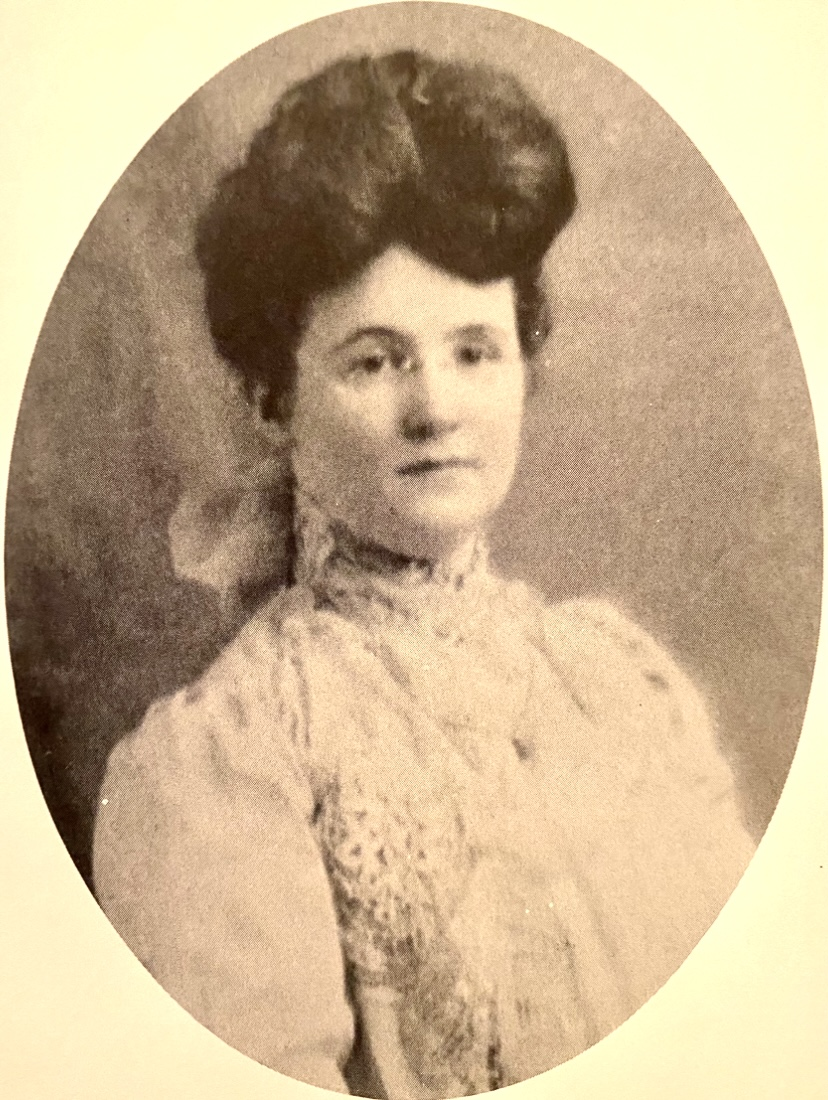

First Lady of North Carolina
- In office January 14, 1925 – January 11, 1929
- Governor: Angus Wilton McLean
- Preceded by: Sara Virginia Ecker Watts Morrison
- Succeeded by: Fay Webb-Gardner

Personal details
- Born: Margaret Jones French; April 29, 1879 Lumberton, North Carolina, U.S.
- Died: November 1, 1959 (aged 80) Lumberton, North Carolina, U.S.
- Resting place: Meadowbrook Cemetery
- Party: Democratic
- Spouse: Angus Wilton McLean
- Children: 3
- Parent(s): James McDaniel French; Edna Godwin
- Education: State Normal and Industrial College; Boston Conservatory of Music

Margaret Jones French McLean (April 29, 1879 – November 1, 1959) was an American political hostess, socialite, and musician. She was affectionately and formally known as Lady Margaret. As the wife of Governor Angus Wilton McLean, she served as First Lady of North Carolina from 1925 to 1929. She was renowned for her extravagant parties and formal dinners, and played host to politicians and celebrities including President Calvin Coolidge, First Lady Grace Coolidge, and the entertainer Will Rogers. McLean was well known in Robeson County for her musical ability and studied music at the State Normal and Industrial College and at the Boston Conservatory of Music.

== Early life and education ==
McLean was born Margaret Jones French on April 29, 1879, in Lumberton, North Carolina to James McDaniel French and Edna Godwin French. She descended from Mayflower passengers. When she was still quite young, her parents divorced and her mother remarried to a physician in Greensboro. After the divorce, Margaret and her brother, George, were raised by their maternal grandparents, Berry Godwin and Martha Faulk Godwin, at their home in Barker Ten Mile.

She was a talented musician and studied music at the State Normal and Industrial College and advanced musical studies at Boston Conservatory of Music. She was well known in Robeson County for her musical ability.

== Public life ==
Upon her husband's election as Governor of North Carolina, McLean became the First Lady of North Carolina in 1925. She was unable to attend the inaugural events due to suffering from pneumonia, so Lieutenant Governor J. Elmer Long and Second Lady Lessie Ermine Peay Long went in her and her husband's place.

At the North Carolina Executive Mansion, she was known for her decorating talents and for hosting many formal dinners with various themes. She created table settings and centerpieces for formal parties that were replicas of historical scenes and portrayals of various settings. For one event, she transformed the mansion's ballroom into a spring garden with stone benches and a profusion of flowers and foliage. For a traditional New Year's Eve reception and open house, she decorated the dining room table with a complex snow scene. Three thousand guests attended her New Year's Eve event. McLean hosted a springtime event for the United Daughters of the Confederacy, transforming the mansion ballroom into a garden with trees, scrubs, flowers, and a fountain. On George Washington's Birthday, she hosted a party for the Daughters of the American Revolution and decorated the dining room table with a realistic depiction of George Washington's crossing of the Delaware River. After her elaborate parties, she would host children's parties before having the decorations removed. McLean often hired a bagpipe player to entertain her guests and promote the family's Scottish heritage.

While she made no public speeches during her time as first lady, she did make a few public appearances. McLean hosted formal teas for the calling public every Wednesday afternoon. While it was customary at the time to host parties categorically, with legislators and ministers separated, she preferred to mix groups while entertaining. McLean hosted notable guests at the mansion including President Calvin Coolidge, First Lady Grace Coolidge, and the entertainer Will Rogers.

McLean planned every menu, ordered all food for the mansion, and occasionally oversaw the cooking of the meals. Every Christmas, she presented a pig with an apple in its mouth on the dinner table. McLean ran the household and managed the servants without the help of a social secretary or housekeeper. She brought one of her servants from Lumberton, Rosetta Ross Martin, with her to the mansion. McLean also employed a butler, David "Uncle Dave" Haywood, who assisted her with floral arrangements.

When the mansion received a low rating of 71 from the North Carolina State Board of Health, McLean saw to it that the house was thoroughly cleaned and repaired. She had exposed plumbing and heating pipes removed, dirt beneath floorboards used for cushioning the sound cleaned out, rebuilt the kitchen, and had large Jacobean pieces of furniture and tapestries added to the decor. During this time, she also had portraits restored and salvaged earlier American-made pieces of furniture. She hired the decorator Harry Pier Giavina from Wilmington to assist her.

McLean ordered that all items in the mansion be initialed so that those purchased by the state would remain in the mansion's permanent collection while those belonging to each First Family would be taken with them at the end of each governor's term. She supplemented the mansion's table settings with her own collection of china, silver, and crystal.

== Personal life ==
McLean was known for her beauty and refused to pose for formal photographs as she aged, as her dark hair turned white and she felt that her glasses were uncomplimentary to her features. She wore her hair piled high on her head and fastened with a Spanish comb. She was strict about the care of her skin and refused to wear cosmetics.

In 1904, she married the lawyer and banker Angus Wilton McLean following a seven-year courtship. The wedding was held at the home of her maternal grandparents. They had three children: Angus Wilton McLean II, Margaret French McLean Shepherd, and Hector MacLean.

The McLeans lived in Duart House, a large, white-columned Neoclassical mansion in Lumberton that they built in 1910 on the grounds of her maternal family's home. At Duart House, McLean hosted many children for Halloween and donated money for medical and dental care for local children. She also funded multiple children's stays at summer camps and donated new clothes to children in need.

The family lived in Washington, D.C. following their term in the executive mansion, as her husband set up a law practice there. Following her husband's death on June 21, 1943, she and her children returned to Lumberton. Upon returning to North Carolina, she rekindled her relationship with her mother before her mother's death in 1939.

== Death ==
McLean died on November 1, 1959, at Duart House. She was buried in Meadowbrook Cemetery in Lumberton.

Honorary titles
Preceded by Sara Virginia Ecker Watts Morrison	First Lady of North Carolina; 1925–1929	Succeeded by Fay Webb-Gardner
