= 1920 United States Senate election in North Carolina =

- November 2, 1920
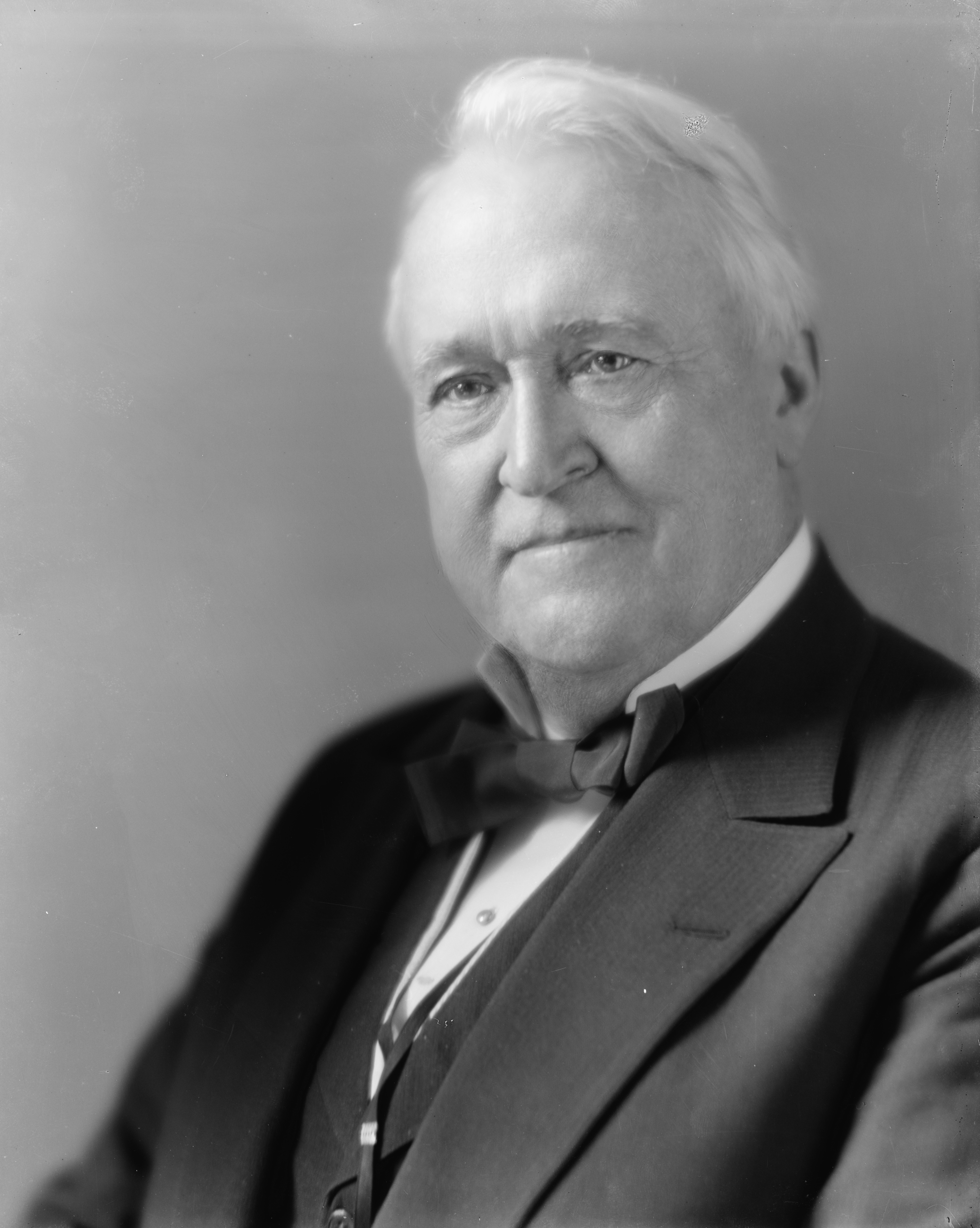

| Nominee | Lee S. Overman | Gene Holton |
| Party | Democratic | Republican |
| Popular vote | 310,504 | 229,343 |
| Percentage | 57.52% | 42.48% |
- County Results; Overman: 50–60% 60–70% 70–80% 80–90% 90–100% Holton: 50–60% 60–70% 70–80% 80–90%
U.S. senator before election
Lee Slater Overman
Democratic
Elected U.S. Senator
Lee Slater Overman
Democratic

The 1920 United States Senate election in North Carolina was held on November 2, 1920. Incumbent Democratic Senator Lee Slater Overman was re-elected to a fourth term in office, defeating Republican A. E. Holton.

== Democratic primary ==
=== Candidates ===
- Aubrey Lee Brooks, Roxboro attorney
- Lee Slater Overman, incumbent Senator since 1903

=== Results ===
1926 Democratic Senate primary
| Party | Candidate | Votes | % |
|---|---|---|---|
| Democratic | Lee Slater Overman (incumbent) | 94,806 | 79.89% |
| Democratic | Aubrey L. Brooks | 23,869 | 20.11% |
| Total votes | | 118,675 | 100.00% |

== General election ==
=== Candidates ===
- A. Eugene Holton, former U.S. Attorney for the Western District of North Carolina and chair of the North Carolina Republican Party (Republican)
- Lee Slater Overman, incumbent Senator since 1903 (Democratic)

=== Results ===
1926 U.S. Senate election in North Carolina
| Party | Candidate | Votes | % |
|---|---|---|---|
| Democratic | Lee Slater Overman (Incumbent) | 310,504 | 57.52% |
| Republican | A. Eugene Holton | 229,343 | 42.48% |
| Majority | | 81,161 | 15.04% |
| Turnout | | 539,847 | |
| Democratic hold | | | |
