= 1914 United States Senate election in North Carolina =

- November 3, 1914
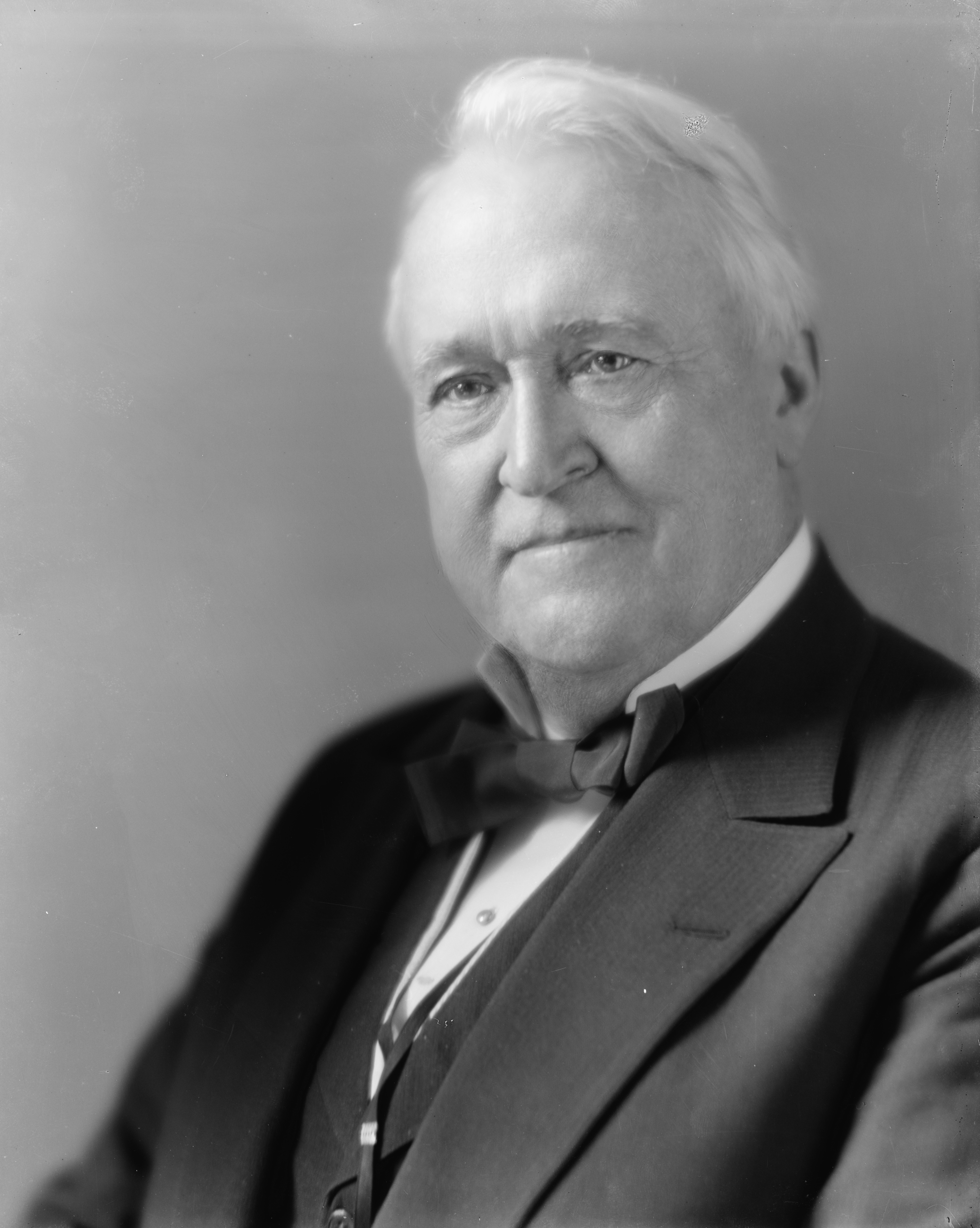

Nominee	Lee S. Overman	A. A. Whitener
Party	Democratic	Republican
Popular vote	121,342	87,101
Percentage	58.10%	41.70%
- County results Overman: 50–60% 60–70% 70–80% 80–90% >90% Whitener: 50–60% 60–70% 70–80%
U.S. senator before election
Lee S. Overman
Democratic
Elected U.S. senator
Lee S. Overman
Democratic

The 1914 United States Senate election in North Carolina was held on November 2, 1914. Incumbent Democratic Senator Lee Slater Overman was re-elected to a third term in office, defeating Republican A. A. Whitener.

== General election ==
=== Candidates ===
- Henry J. Oliver (Socialist)
- Lee Slater Overman, incumbent Senator since 1903 (Democratic)
- A. A. Whitener (Republican)

=== Results ===
1914 U.S. Senate election in North Carolina
Party	Candidate	Votes	%
Democratic	Lee S. Overman (incumbent)	121,342	58.10
Republican	Adolphus A. Whitener	87,101	41.70
Socialist	Henry J. Oliver	425	0.20
Majority		34,241	16.39
Total votes		208,868	100.00
Democratic hold			
