= Morrocroft =

Historic house in North Carolina, United States

- U.S. National Register of Historic Places
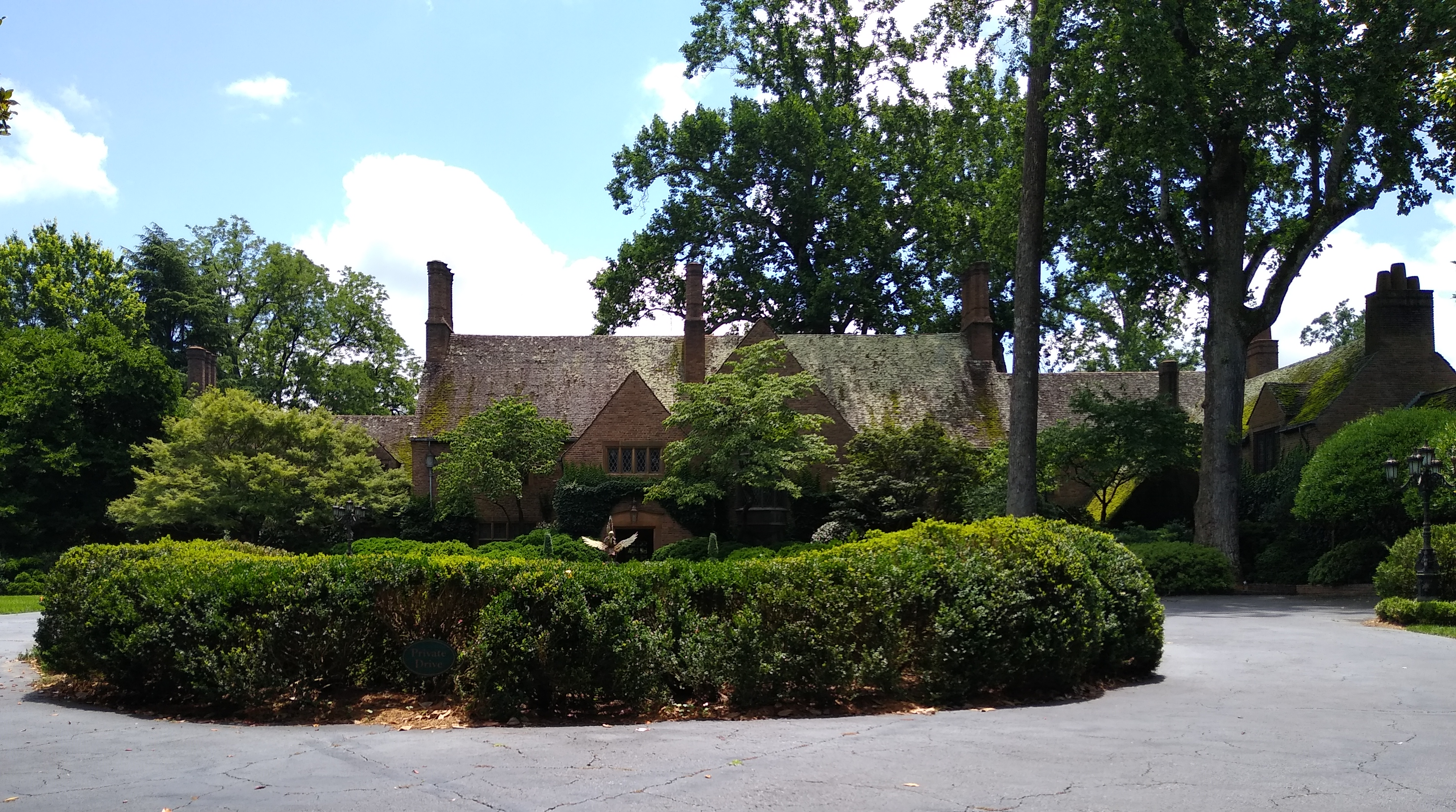

- Location within North Carolina Location within the United States
- Location: 2525 Richardson Dr., Charlotte, North Carolina
- Coordinates: 35°9′35″N 80°49′22″W
- Area: 2 acres (0.81 ha)
- Built: c. 1925-1927
- Architect: Lindeberg, Harrie Thomas
- Architectural style: Colonial Revival, Tudor Revival
- NRHP reference No.: 83003970
- Added to NRHP: November 28, 1983

Morrocroft is a historic home located at Charlotte, Mecklenburg County, North Carolina. It was designed by architect Harrie T. Lindeberg and built between 1925 and 1927. It is a Colonial Revival/Tudor Revival-style brick manor house. It consists of a main two story block (2 1/2 stories on the rear facade) with rambling 1 1/2-story side wings. It is characterized by picturesque massing, rhythmic spacing of mullioned, multipaned grouped windows, and numerous multi-stack chimneys rising from steeply pitched gable roofs. It was built by North Carolina Governor and Congressman Cameron A. Morrison and his second wife, Sara Ecker Watts Morrison. After Morrison's death in 1953, the house passed to his daughter, Angelia Lawrance Morrison Harris.

The Morrison family owned the home until 1981. It was listed on the National Register of Historic Places in 1983.
