= 1916 North Carolina gubernatorial election =

- November 7, 1916
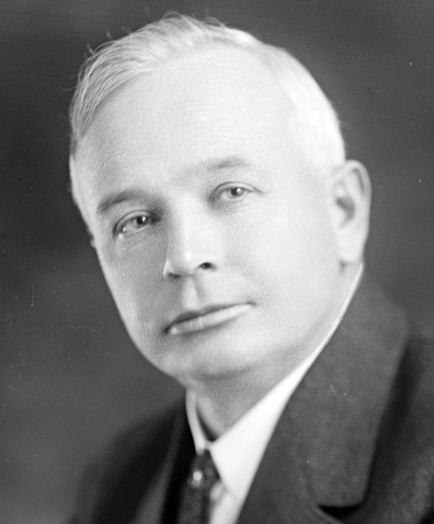

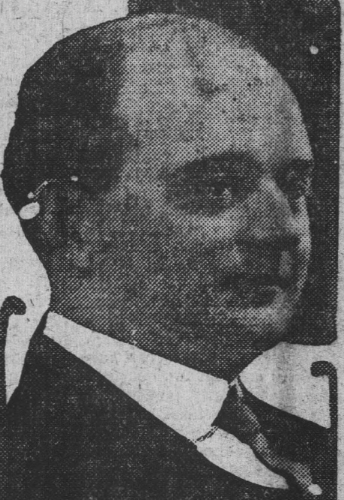
Nominee	Thomas Walter Bickett	Frank A. Linney
Party	Democratic	Republican
Popular vote	167,761	120,157
Percentage	58.15%	41.65%
- County results Bickett: 50–60% 60–70% 70–80% 80–90% >90% Linney: 50–60% 60–70% 70–80%
Governor before election
Locke Craig
Democratic
Elected Governor
Thomas Walter Bickett
Democratic

The 1916 North Carolina gubernatorial election was held on November 7, 1916. Democratic nominee Thomas Walter Bickett defeated Republican nominee Frank A. Linney with 58.15% of the vote. At the time, Bickett was the state's attorney general, while Linney was an attorney and chairman of the North Carolina Republican Party.

== Primary elections ==
Primary elections were held on June 3, 1916.

=== Democratic primary ===
==== Candidates ====
- Thomas Walter Bickett, North Carolina attorney general
- Elijah L. Daughtridge, incumbent lieutenant governor

==== Results ====
Democratic primary results
Party	Candidate	Votes	%
Democratic	Thomas Walter Bickett	63,121	63.03
Democratic	Elijah L. Daughtridge	37,017	36.97
Total votes		100,138	100.00

== General election ==
=== Candidates ===
Major party candidates

- Thomas Walter Bickett, Democratic
- Frank A. Linney, Republican

Other candidates

- Leonhard Miller, Socialist

=== Results ===
1916 North Carolina gubernatorial election
Party	Candidate	Votes	%	±%
Democratic	Thomas Walter Bickett	167,761	58.15%	
Republican	Frank A. Linney	120,157	41.65%	
Socialist	Leonhard Miller	590	0.21%	
Majority		47,604		
Turnout				
Democratic hold		Swing		
