= Thomas Walter Bickett =

American politician

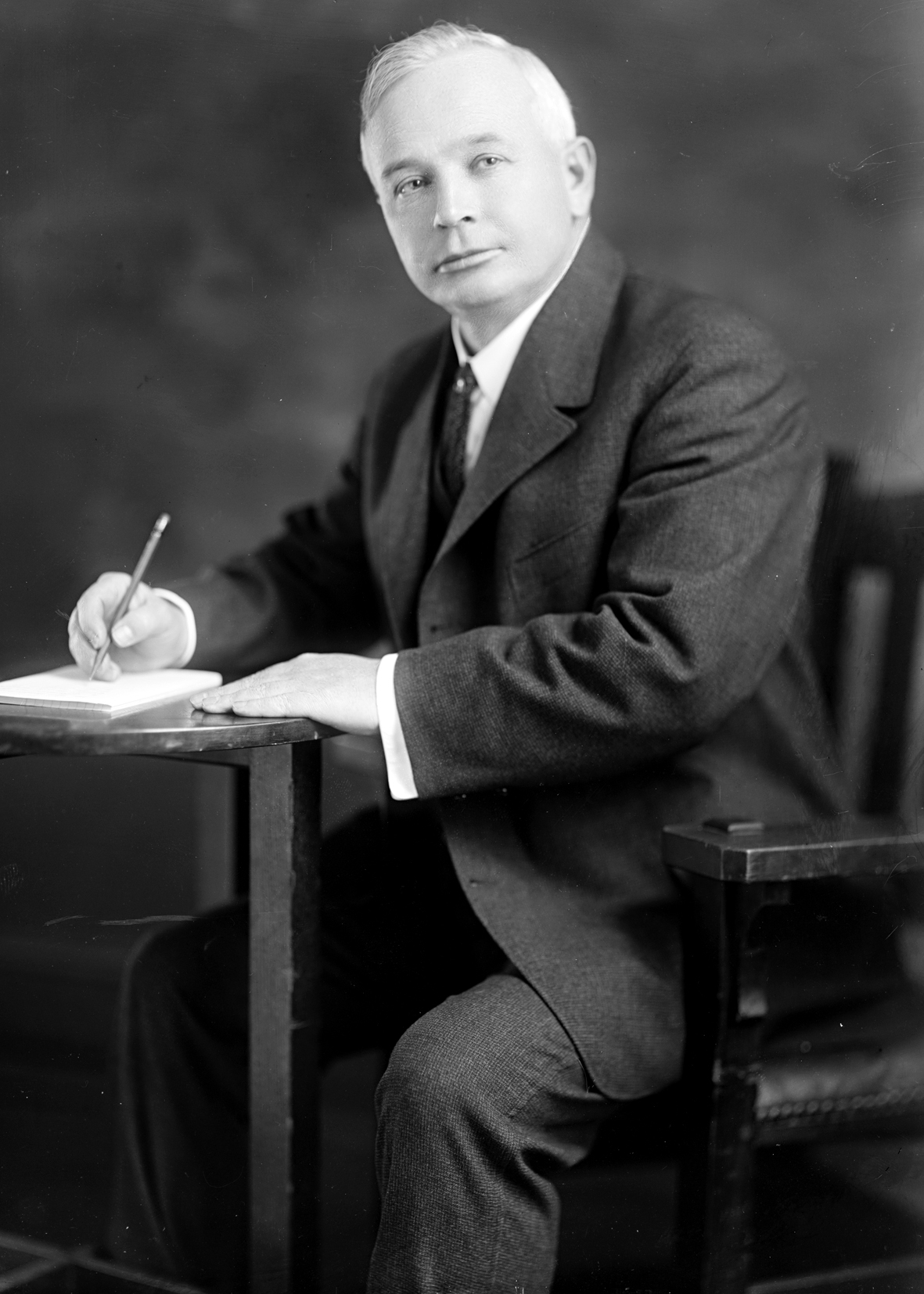

54th Governor of North Carolina
- In office January 11, 1917 – January 12, 1921
- Lieutenant: Oliver Max Gardner
- Preceded by: Locke Craig
- Succeeded by: Cameron A. Morrison

Attorney General of North Carolina
- In office 1909–1917
- Governor: William Walton Kitchin; Locke Craig
- Preceded by: Robert D. Gilmer
- Succeeded by: James S. Manning

Member of the North Carolina General Assembly

Personal details
- Born: Thomas Walter Bickett; February 28, 1869 Monroe, North Carolina, U.S.
- Died: December 28, 1921 (aged 52) Raleigh, North Carolina, U.S.
- Party: Democratic
- Spouse: Fanny Neal Yarborough
- Children: 3
- Education: Wake Forest University
- Profession: Lawyer, politician

Thomas Walter Bickett (February 28, 1869 – December 28, 1921) was the 54th governor of the U.S. state of North Carolina from 1917 to 1921. He was born in Monroe, North Carolina.

Bickett was a graduate of Wake Forest College. Prior to being elected Governor, Bickett practiced law in Louisburg, represented Franklin County in the North Carolina General Assembly and then served as North Carolina Attorney General for two terms (1909–1917).

On November 29, 1898, he married Fanny Neal Yarborough of Rose Hill Plantation.

In 1916, Bickett became the first state governor who was nominated by means of a Democratic Party primary election (in which he defeated Lt. Gov. Elijah L. Daughtridge). Under Bickett's leadership, various reforms were implemented including improvements in child welfare, public health, electricity, and running water. He also persuaded the legislature to establish the state's first income tax. He also had to lead the state through World War I. He was also governor when women got the right to vote.

Walter Bickett Elementary in Monroe, North Carolina (where he was born), is named for him. Two school locations have his name. The original Walter Bickett School opened in March 1922 on Lancaster Avenue as Monroe High School, the city's first high school, and was named "sometime later" for Bickett. It remained a high school until the present Monroe High School was built in 1960, and was replaced in 2003 with a new Walter Bickett Elementary. The older building became Walter Bickett Pre-K Education Center.

== Notes ==
Party political offices
Preceded by Robert D. Gilmer	Democratic nominee for Attorney General of North Carolina; 1908, 1912	Succeeded by James S. Manning
Preceded by Locke Craig	Democratic nominee for Governor of North Carolina; 1916	Succeeded by Cameron A. Morrison
Legal offices
Preceded by Robert D. Gilmer	Attorney General of North Carolina; 1909–1917	Succeeded by James S. Manning
Political offices
Preceded by Locke Craig	Governor of North Carolina; 1917–1921	Succeeded by Cameron A. Morrison
