= 1938 United States Senate election in North Carolina =

- November 7, 1938
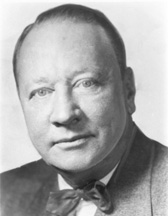

Nominee	Robert R. Reynolds	Charles A. Jonas
Party	Democratic	Republican
Popular vote	316,685	179,461
Percentage	63.83%	36.17%
- Results by county Reynolds: 50–60% 60–70% 70–80% 80–90% >90% Jonas: 50–60% 60–70%
Senator before election
Robert Rice Reynolds
Democratic
Elected Senator
Robert Rice Reynolds
Democratic

The 1938 United States Senate election in North Carolina was held on November 7, 1938. Incumbent Democratic Senator Robert Rice Reynolds was re-elected to a second term in office, defeating U.S. Representative Franklin Wills Hancock Jr. in the Democratic primary and Republican former U.S. Representative Charles A. Jonas in the general election.

== Democratic primary ==
=== Candidates ===
- Franklin Wills Hancock Jr., U.S. Representative from Oxford
- Robert Rice Reynolds, incumbent Senator since 1933

=== Results ===
1938 Democratic Senate primary
Party	Candidate	Votes	%
Democratic	Robert Rice Reynolds (incumbent)	315,316	61.53%
Democratic	Franklin Wills Hancock Jr.	197,154	38.47%
Total votes		512,470	100.00%

== General election ==
=== Results ===
1938 U.S. Senate election in North Carolina
Party	Candidate	Votes	%	±%
Democratic	Robert Rice Reynolds (incumbent)	316,685	63.83%	▼4.79
Republican	Charles A. Jonas	179,461	36.17%	▲4.79
Total votes		496,146	100.00%	
