= A. D. Watts =

American politician

Alston Davidson "Aus" Watts (1867–1927) was a North Carolina politician. A Democrat, Watts represented Iredell County, North Carolina in the North Carolina House of Representatives (1901 and 1903) and in the North Carolina Senate.

In 1912, Watts did not support Woodrow Wilson for the Democratic nomination for President, but Wilson appointed him as a federal revenue collector for western North Carolina in 1913, at the behest of Sen. Lee S. Overman.

His most important role, arguably, was as "chief lieutenant" to U.S. Senator Furnifold Simmons, whose powerful political machine dominated North Carolina politics in the early 20th century, according to the journalist Rob Christensen.

Watts was instrumental in helping Cameron Morrison win the Democratic primary for Governor in 1920, using race-baiting tactics.

After the election, Morrison appointed Watts as the first state Department of Revenue Secretary. He resigned in 1923 after police caught him in the company of an African-American prostitute.

Watts returned to his hometown of Statesville, where he died four years later. Most of the state's Democratic Party leadership attended his funeral.

== Bibliography ==
- Rob Christensen, "What the obituary didn't say", News & Observer, July 13, 2008
- Ed Williams blog: "Sex scandal changed N.C. politics", Charlotte News & Observer, April 2008
- North Carolina Manual of 1913
- The Political Graveyard
- "WILSON IGNORED DANIELS?; North Carolina Collectorship Appointment Produces Senatorial Fight". The New York Times. June 30, 1913. (June 30, 1913)
