= Reynolds House (Asheville, North Carolina) =

Historic house in North Carolina, United States

- U.S. National Register of Historic Places
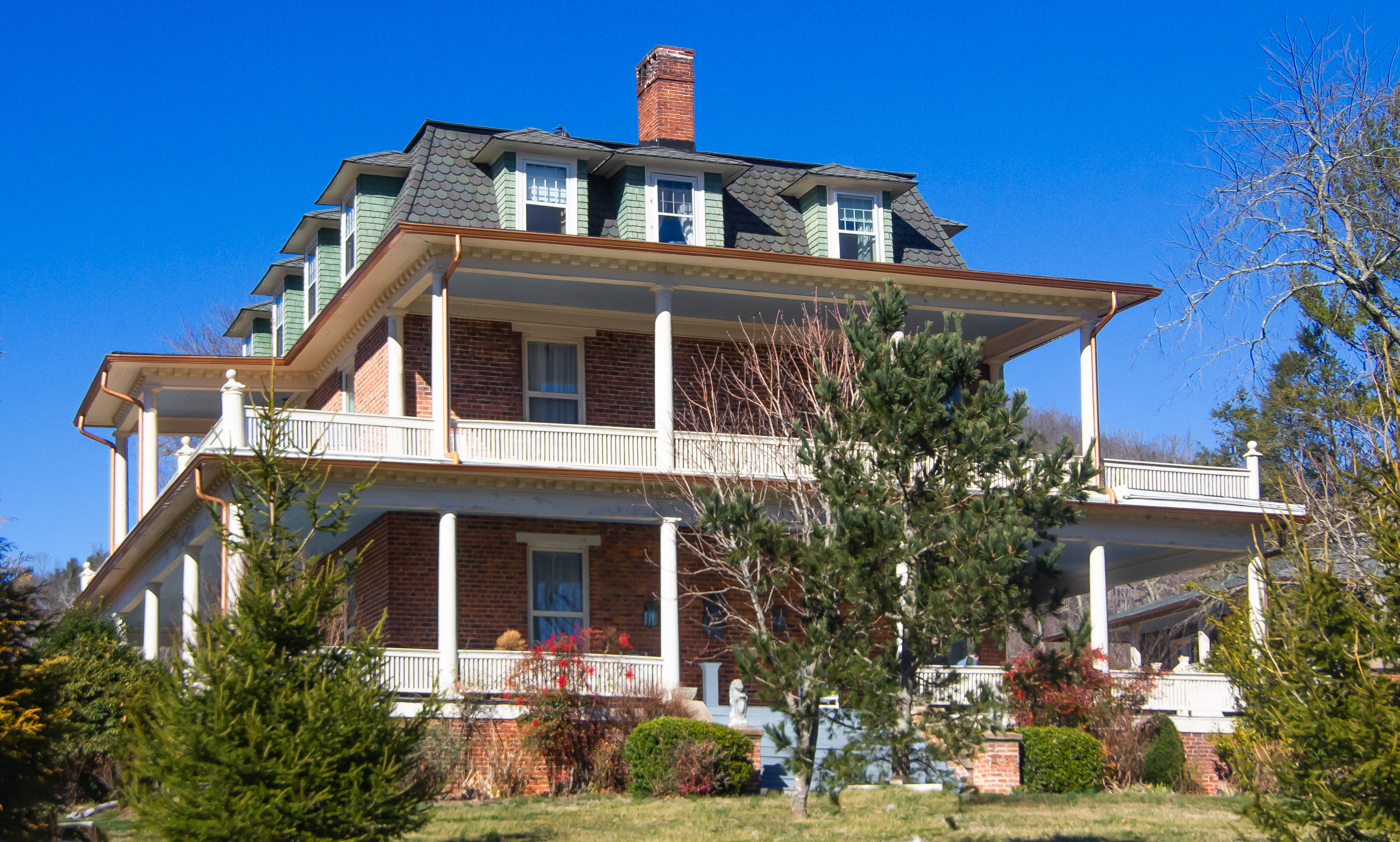

- Location within North Carolina Location within the United States
- Location: 100 Reynolds Hts., Asheville, North Carolina
- Coordinates: 35°38′37″N 82°34′41″W
- Area: 3.5 acres (1.4 ha)
- Built: c. 1855, 1905
- Architectural style: Colonial Revival
- NRHP reference No.: 84001934
- Added to NRHP: September 13, 1984

Reynolds House is a historic home located at Asheville, Buncombe County, North Carolina. It was built about 1855, and renovated in 1905 in the Colonial Revival style. It consists of a two-story double pile plan brick core structure with a third floor within a dormered mansard roof. It features a wraparound porch.

It was listed on the National Register of Historic Places in 1984.
