= Welcome Wagon =

American marketing company

Welcome Wagon is a marketing business in the United States (and formerly in Canada) that contacts new homeowners after relocation, providing them with coupons and advertisements from local businesses.

The company was founded in 1928, by Thomas Briggs in Memphis, Tennessee. Briggs later established the Thomas W. Briggs Foundation in 1957.

When the company was founded, Welcome Wagon "hostesses" would visit new homeowners with a gift basket containing samples, coupons, and advertising from contributing businesses. These home visits continued for over 50 years until 1998, when then-owner Cendant laid off the "hostesses", saying that changing demographics meant few homeowners would be at home when representatives called.

Welcome Wagon Canada, a separate company, continued to offer home visits until it closed in May 2020. It also operated events for people planning a wedding or expecting a baby. Welcome Wagon in Canada was founded in 1930 and was run for many years by Pauline Hill, who first became a Hostess in 1953 and advanced to be head of the company as CEO (1962–1990). Welcome Wagon Ltd. became a wholly Canadian-owned entity in 1979 when a group of Canadian managers purchased it outright from the US owners. Its head office was situated in Toronto, Ontario, Canada. Hostesses were subsequently known as representatives.

Welcome Wagon International has had several owners. In 1995, CUC International Inc. which subsequently merged into Cendant acquired Welcome Wagon. In 2001, Homestore Inc., later known as Move, Inc., bought Welcome Wagon.

Move, Inc. announced in August 2008 that it was putting Welcome Wagon International, Inc. up for sale. On June 26, 2009, the South Florida Media Group, publisher of South Florida-based local publications, acquired Welcome Wagon International, Inc. In 2014, Welcome Wagon was sold to coupon company Money Mailer.

Welcome Wagon International, Inc., originally based in Memphis, Tennessee, moved from Westbury, New York to Plainview, New York in 2004. The company had local representatives throughout the United States. Welcome Wagon still markets to new residents through mail and telemarketing calls, and online. The company is now based in Coral Springs, Florida.
