= Rose Hill (Louisburg, North Carolina) =

Historic house in North Carolina, United States

- U.S. National Register of Historic Places
- Location within North Carolina Location within the United States
- Location: W side of US 401 S, 0.25 mi. N of NC 1110, near Louisburg, North Carolina
- Coordinates: 36°4′15″N 78°19′54″W
- Area: 9 acres (3.6 ha)
- Built: 1803
- Architectural style: Queen Anne, Neoclassical, et al.
- NRHP reference No.: 06000339
- Added to NRHP: May 3, 2006

Rose Hill, later known as Timberlake House, is a historic plantation house located near Louisburg, Franklin County, North Carolina. The main block was built about 1803, and is a two-story, five-bay, transitional Georgian / Federal style frame dwelling. It has a gable roof and double-shouldered brick end chimneys. A rear ell was expanded about 1840, and about 1880 a one-story Queen Anne-style, full width verandah was added. About 1910, a Neoclassical portico was added over the verandah, as was a bathroom wing. Also on the property are the contributing slave quarter (c. 1840), kitchen (c. 1840), playhouse (c. 1910), and generator / wellhouse (c. 1910).

It was listed on the National Register of Historic Places in 2006.

North Carolina First Lady Fanny Yarborough Bickett was born here.
