= Lee S. Overman =

American politician (1854–1930)

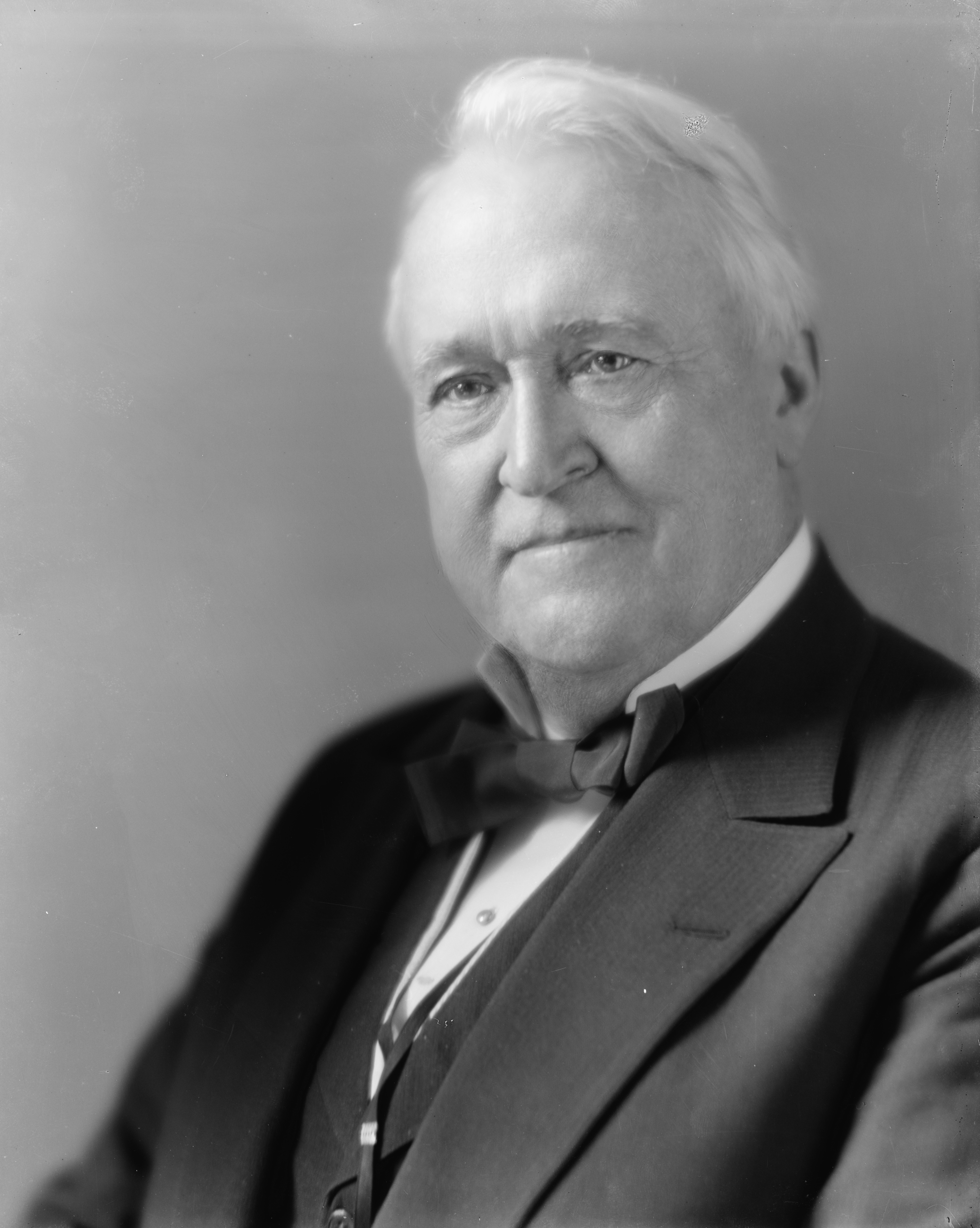
- Overman circa 1918

United States Senator from North Carolina
- In office March 4, 1903 – December 12, 1930
- Preceded by: Jeter Connelly Pritchard
- Succeeded by: Cameron A. Morrison

Speaker of the North Carolina House of Representatives
- In office 1893–1895
- Preceded by: Rufus A. Doughton
- Succeeded by: Zeb V. Walser

Member of the North Carolina House of Representatives from Rowan County
- In office 1899–1901
- Preceded by: Pete Murphy
- Succeeded by: R. Lee Wright
- In office 1893–1895
- Preceded by: S. A. Earnhardt
- Succeeded by: D. R. Julian
- In office 1883–1889
- Preceded by: Frank Brown; J. L. Graeber
- Succeeded by: J. S. McCubbins

Personal details
- Born: January 3, 1854 Salisbury, North Carolina
- Died: December 12, 1930 (aged 76) Washington, D.C.
- Resting place: Chestnut Hill Cemetery
- Party: Democratic

Lee Slater Overman (January 3, 1854 – December 12, 1930) was an American politician from North Carolina. He served as a Democratic U.S. senator between 1903 and 1930. He was the first U.S. senator to be elected by popular vote in the state, as the legislature had appointed senators prior to passage of the 17th Amendment to the US Constitution authorizing popular elections of senators. He served as a senator until 1930 when he died when he was two years into his fifth term.

== Early life and education ==
Overman was born in Salisbury, North Carolina, the son of William H. and Mary E. Slater Overman. He attended Trinity College (now Duke University), Class of 1874, where he was a member of Chi Phi fraternity.

== Career ==
After he graduated from Trinity College, he taught at Winston-Salem School for two years and received a Master of Arts from Trinity College.

He became very close with Zebulon Baird Vance, who was a leading opponent of Reconstruction. He became one of his personal secretaries when Vance was elected governor, which led him into his life in politics.

Overman was elected to the North Carolina House of Representatives and served a term as its speaker.

In 1914, Overman became the first U.S. Senator from North Carolina to be elected by popular vote, after passage of the 17th Amendment to the Constitution in 1913 standardized popular election of senators. This was the beginning of his time when he was elected for a second term after his first term of six years had expired. In 1902 and 1909, Overman had been appointed to the Senate seat by the state legislature. The biggest reforms that Overman was in favor of were corporate interests and labor reform. Overman’s economic policies made him lean toward the progressive side.

After the war the senator was active in the investigation of German and Bolshevik propaganda and played a role in bringing on the first Red Scare that plagued American politics in 1919 and 1920. This was after the first World War when many innocent men and women were being called in and taken away from their jobs and lives and brought in for questioning and even jailed at some points. He wanted to keep the Red Scare contained so people would not catch wind of it and live in fear. He wrote and sponsored the Overman Act of 1918, which gave President Woodrow Wilson extraordinary powers to coordinate government agencies in wartime. Overman chaired a Senate committee after World War I to investigate activities during the first Red Scare, which many see as a precursor to the House Un-American Activities Committee.

In 1922, Overman was one of the leaders of a 1-hour, 45 minute filibuster that helped defeat the Dyer Anti-Lynching Bill. In his lengthy speech, he said that the bill was a partisan attempt to solidify the Republican hold on the northern Black vote, that the bill had been written by a Black person, and that ignorant Black people in the South would interpret the bill as permission to "commit the foulest of outrages."

In World War II, the United States liberty ship SS Lee S. Overman was named in his honor. The year after its launch, it struck a mine and sank over the course of a few days.

== Overman Committee ==
Overman chaired the Overman Committee, a subcommittee that investigated foreign propaganda and Bolshevism in the United States during the first Red Scare from 1919 to 1921. He was chosen to head the commission called the Overman Committee by President Woodrow Wilson. After the war the senator was active in the investigation of German and Bolshevik propaganda and played a role in bringing on the so-called Red Scare that plagued American politics in 1919 and 1920 (Beaver).

== See also ==
- List of members of the United States Congress who died in office (1900–1949)

Party political offices
First	Democratic nominee for U.S. Senator from North Carolina (Class 3); 1914, 1920, 1926	Succeeded by Robert Rice Reynolds
U.S. Senate
Preceded by Jeter Connelly Pritchard	U.S. senator (Class 3) from North Carolina; 1903–1930; Served alongside: Furnifold McLendel Simmons	Succeeded by Cameron A. Morrison
