= Angus Wilton McLean =

American politician (1870–1935)

Angus W. McLean
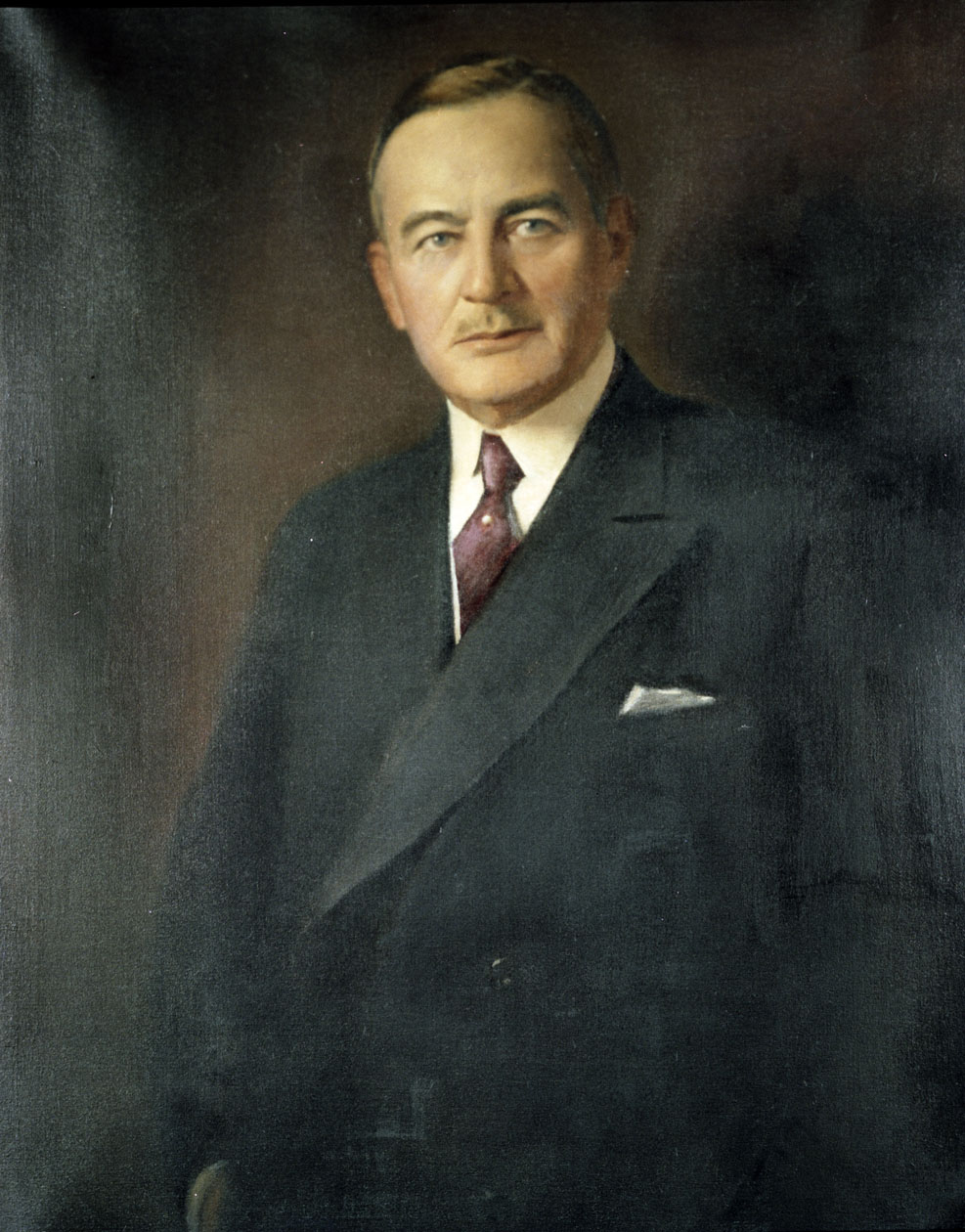

56th Governor of North Carolina
- In office January 14, 1925 – January 11, 1929
- Lieutenant: Jacob E. Long
- Preceded by: Cameron A. Morrison
- Succeeded by: Oliver Max Gardner

Personal details
- Born: April 20, 1870 Robeson County, North Carolina, U.S.
- Died: June 21, 1935 (aged 65) Washington D.C., U.S.
- Party: Democratic
- Spouse: Margaret French McLean
- Education: University of North Carolina
- Profession: Businessman
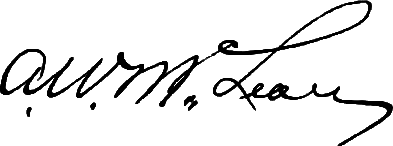
- Signature

Angus Wilton McLean (April 20, 1870 – June 21, 1935) was an American lawyer and banker who was the 56th governor of North Carolina, serving from 1925 to 1929. McLean also served as Assistant Secretary of the United States Department of the Treasury from 1920 to 1921.

== Biography ==
Born in Maxton, North Carolina the son of Archibald Alexander and Caroline Amanda Purcell McLean, he is a descendant of a line of Scots who settled in the Upper Cape Fear Valley. He was educated at the University of North Carolina at Chapel Hill, where he earned a law degree in 1892. McLean first entered politics in 1892, serving as the chairman of the Robeson County Democratic Executive Committee. A supporter of Woodrow Wilson, he was a delegate to Democratic National Conventions and sat on the Democratic National Committee. From 1918 to 1922 he served on the War Finance Corporation board, and from 1920 to 1921 he was the assistant secretary of the Treasury.

McLean secured the Democratic gubernatorial nomination in 1924 by defeating Josiah W. Bailey. During his tenure, an executive budget system was initiated; a department of conservation and development was established; and the Great Smoky Mountains National Park was formed. Governor McLean also helped streamlined North Carolina's economy, which led to a $2.5 million state budget surplus that his successor Oliver Gardner claimed later helped the state survive the Great Depression. After completing his term, McLean retired from political life.

He died on June 21, 1935, in Washington, D.C. Death was attributed to a blood clot in his right lung. He had been ill for several weeks.

== Legacy ==
His son, Hector (1920–2012), became a bank president and state senator.

Party political offices
Preceded by Cameron A. Morrison	Democratic nominee for Governor of North Carolina; 1924	Succeeded by Oliver Max Gardner
Political offices
Preceded by Cameron A. Morrison	Governor of North Carolina; 1925–1929	Succeeded by Oliver Max Gardner
