= Cameron A. Morrison =

American politician

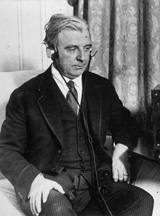

Member of the U.S. House of Representatives from North Carolina's 10th district
- In office January 3, 1943 – January 3, 1945
- Preceded by: New Constituency (Redistricting)
- Succeeded by: Joseph W. Ervin

United States Senator from North Carolina
- In office December 13, 1930 – December 4, 1932
- Appointed by: Oliver Max Gardner
- Preceded by: Lee S. Overman
- Succeeded by: Robert R. Reynolds

55th Governor of North Carolina
- In office January 12, 1921 – January 14, 1925
- Lieutenant: William B. Cooper
- Preceded by: Thomas Walter Bickett
- Succeeded by: Angus Wilton McLean

Personal details
- Born: October 5, 1869 Rockingham, North Carolina, U.S.
- Died: August 20, 1953 (aged 83) Quebec City, Quebec, Canada
- Party: Democratic
- Spouse(s): Lottie May Tomlinson; Sara Virginia Ecker Watts
- Children: 4 (including Angelia Lawrance Morrison Harris)

Cameron A. Morrison (October 5, 1869 – August 20, 1953) was an American politician and the 55th governor of the U.S. state of North Carolina from 1921 to 1925.

== Early life and career ==
He was born in 1869 in Richmond County, North Carolina. His father Daniel Morrison had reluctantly fought for the Confederacy during the Civil War, but had joined the Republican Party after the Civil War. Clarence Morrison initially inherited his father's Republican Party affiliation and was elected to the state Republican Committee in 1890 at the age of just 21. But just one year later, Cameron Morrison changed his affiliation to the Democratic Party.

In 1898, Morrison participated in the Wilmington massacre, a violent coup d'état by a group of white supremacists. They expelled opposition black and white political leaders from the city, destroyed the property and businesses of black citizens built up since the Civil War, including the only black newspaper in the city, and killed an estimated 60 to more than 300 people. The governor of North Carolina, Daniel Lindsay Russell, was forced to flee from Wilmington to Raleigh. Morrison boarded Russell's train in Maxton, North Carolina in the company of a small band of Red Shirts and warned Russell that a more hostile band of Red Shirts were waiting at a later stop. He advised Russell to hide in the baggage car to avoid being lynched, which he did.

In 1900, he was elected to the North Carolina Senate for one term.

== Governorship ==
With the backing of Sen. Furnifold Simmons and the help of race-baiting tactics employed by A. D. Watts, Morrison defeated O. Max Gardner in the 1920 Democratic primary for governor. Morrison's gubernatorial campaign stressed his Red Shirt activity 20 years earlier, and also stressed his opposition to women's suffrage. In the general election, he defeated Republican nominee John J. Parker.

Morrison was inaugurated on January 12, 1921. He came to be called "the Good Roads governor" for his support of a modern highway system. Morrison also presided over various reforms and pushed for increased funds for public education, while also battling the teaching of the theory of evolution.

== Later career ==
He was later appointed to serve as a United States senator for the state of North Carolina (after the death of Lee S. Overman) between 1930 and 1932, but lost his seat in the Democratic primary runoff to Robert R. Reynolds.

Morrison was later elected to one term in the United States House of Representatives from 1943 to 1945. He again lost a Democratic primary for a U.S. Senate seat in 1944, to Clyde R. Hoey. Morrison continued to promote white supremacy until the end of his life and never apologized for his role in the 1898 Red Shirt campaign. Although Morrison was angered by Harry Truman's pro-civil rights stances in 1948, he endorsed Truman for re-election rather than Dixiecrat candidate Strom Thurmond, because he believed that Southern congressmen and Senators would prevent Truman from enacting civil right measures. He died in Quebec City in 1953.

== Personal life ==
Morrison was married twice. His first wife, Lottie May Tomlinson, gave birth to four children but only one, Angelia Lawrance Morrison, survived infancy. Tomlinson died in 1919.

In 1924, while serving as governor, Morrison married a second time to Sara Virginia Ecker Watts, the widow of George Washington Watts. Their wedding ceremony was held at Harwood Hall. With his second wife, Morrison built Morrocroft, a large estate in Charlotte. In his will, or possible before he died, Governor Morrison gave the back section of his personal home for the black congregation of Sharon Road Methodist Church. The land currently hosts unmarked graves of the black parishioners.

== Legacy ==
A ten-story residence hall on the campus of the University of North Carolina at Chapel Hill is named in Morrison's honor. His home at Charlotte, Morrocroft, was listed on the National Register of Historic Places in 1983.

A library in Charlotte was named after Morrison, but was renamed in 2020 due to Morrison's ties with the Red Shirts and white supremacy. A residence hall at North Carolina A&T State University was also named after Morrison, but the name was removed in 2020.

Party political offices
Preceded by Thomas Walter Bickett	Democratic nominee for Governor of North Carolina; 1920	Succeeded by Angus Wilton McLean
Political offices
Preceded by Thomas Walter Bickett	Governor of North Carolina; 1921–1925	Succeeded by Angus Wilton McLean
U.S. Senate
Preceded by Lee Slater Overman	U.S. senator (Class 3) from North Carolina; 1930–1932; Served alongside: Furnifold McLendel Simmons, Josiah William Bailey	Succeeded by Robert Rice Reynolds
U.S. House of Representatives
Preceded by Alfred L. Bulwinkle	Member of the U.S. House of Representatives from North Carolina's 10th congressional district 1943–1945	Succeeded by Joseph Wilson Ervin
