= The Caucasian =

The Caucasian may refer to:

- The Weekly Caucasian, a Missouri newspaper
- The Daily Caucasian, a North Carolina newspaper
