= Hetty King (disambiguation) =

Hetty King was a British music hall entertainer.

Hetty King may also refer to:

- Hetty King, a character in the Canadian television series Road to Avonlea, played by the actress Jackie Burroughs
- Hetty King, spouse of James Green Martin
