= Governor Locke =

Governor Locke may refer to:

- Locke Craig, 53rd governor of North Carolina (1913–1917)
- Gary Locke, 21st governor of Washington (1997–2005)
