= Hal W. Ayer =

American newspaper editor and politician (died 1913)

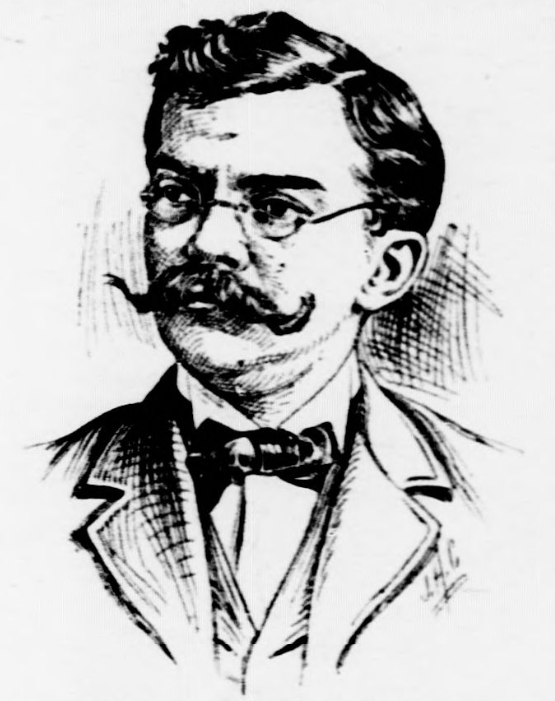
- Ayer c. 1897

7th State Auditor of North Carolina
- In office 1897–1901
- Governor: Daniel Lindsay Russell
- Preceded by: Robert M. Furman
- Succeeded by: Benjamin F. Dixon

Personal details
- Born: Fayetteville, North Carolina, U.S.
- Died: August 12, 1913 New York City
- Party: Populist Party
- Other political affiliations: Democratic

Hal W. Ayer (died August 12, 1913) was an American newspaper editor and politician who served as chairman of the North Carolina People's Party executive committee from 1896 to 1897 and as North Carolina State Auditor from 1897 to 1901.

== Early life ==
Hal W. Ayer was born and raised in Fayetteville, North Carolina, United States. His father was H. W. Ayer and his mother was Virginia Morris. His father served in the Confederate States Army during the American Civil War and was killed in battle in 1864 when Hal was two years of age.

When he was 15 years old, Ayer moved to Raleigh and took a job at Edwards & Broughton. He then served as a bookkeeper for Lee, Johnson & Company. Ayer worked on several newspapers, initially serving as a staffer for The Biblical Recorder before serving as the city editor of The News & Observer and then as the business manager for The Progressive Farmer. He later worked as a private secretary for Progressive Farmer owner Leonidas L. Polk in 1891. In the early 1890s he managed the press bureau of the state chapter of the Farmers' Alliance. He then acted as secretary of the North Carolina Agricultural Association—which managed the North Carolina State Fair—for three years.

== Political career ==
Ayer was initially a member of the Democratic Party. He served as president of the state's Young Men's Democratic Clubs in 1888 and supported gubernatorial candidate Daniel Gould Fowle in that year's election. In March 1895, Marion Butler, a leader of North Carolina's chapter of the People's Party/Populist Party and a U.S. Senator-elect, hired Ayer to edit his newspaper, The Caucasian. With Butler leaving for service in the Senate in Washington D. C., Ayer quickly became one of the most prominent Populist leaders in the state.

Ayer became state chairman of the Populist Party in 1896. In that capacity and with Butler away in Washington, he led the party's campaigning efforts during that year's elections. In January 1897, Ayer resigned from his chairmanship of the party to conform with a state law which banned state officeholders from holding party chairs.

In August 1896 the Populists held their state convention in Raleigh to nominate their candidates for that year's elections. Ayer received the nomination for auditor but, unlike most of the Populist candidates, did not receive a complementary nomination from the state Republican Party. He served as state auditor from 1897 to 1901. He was sued while state auditor by North Carolina governor Daniel L. Russell over a tax issue. At the Populist state convention in May 1898, Ayer, Butler, and Cyrus Thompson led a faction which pushed for abandoning Fusion with the Republican Party in favor of cooperating with the Democrats and supporting white supremacy. Their faction won over the convention, but the Democratic convention declined to work with the Populists.

== Later life ==
After leaving public office in North Carolina, Ayer moved to New York City and worked on the New York Cotton Exchange. He retired from the exchange due to poor health and died in New York on August 12, 1913, at the age of 51. His body was buried in Oakwood Cemetery in Raleigh two days later.

== Works cited ==
- Beeby, James M. (2008). Revolt of the Tar Heels: The North Carolina Populist Movement, 1890–1901. University Press of Mississippi. ISBN 9781604733242.
- Hunt, James L. (2003). Marion Butler and American Populism. Chapel Hill: University of North Carolina Press. ISBN 9780807862506.
- Prather, H. Leon (1979). Resurgent Politics and Educational Progressivism in the New South, North Carolina, 1890-1913. Fairleigh Dickinson University Press. ISBN 9780838620717.

Party political offices
Preceded by Hiram L. Grant	Republican nominee for North Carolina State Auditor; 1896, 1900	Succeeded by Frank A. Linney
First	Populist nominee for North Carolina State Auditor; 1896, 1900	Succeeded by None
