= Liz Williamson (dancer) =

American dancer and choreographer

- Born: Elizabeth Anne Ray; 1919; North Carolina, U.S.
- Died: January 10, 1996 (aged 76–77); New York, New York, U.S.
- Education: Palmer Memorial Institute; Radcliffe College (BA); New York University (MFA)
- Occupations: dancer, dance teacher, choreographer
- Spouse: William Elliott Williamson
- Relatives: James H. Young (grandfather)
- Career
- Former groups: Alvin Ailey American Dance Theater

Elizabeth Anne Ray "Liz" Williamson (1919–1996) was an American dancer, dance teacher, and choreographer. She was a member of the Alvin Ailey American Dance Theater and the first artist-in-residence at Jacob's Pillow.

== Early life, family, and education ==
Williamson was born in North Carolina in 1919. She was from a prominent African-American family in Raleigh, North Carolina, and was the granddaughter of Colonel James H. Young, who served as an officer Third North Carolina Regiment during the Spanish–American War and was later elected to the North Carolina House of Representatives.

She attended the Palmer Memorial Institute, a school in Sedalia for upper-class African Americans. Williamson graduated with honors from Radcliffe College, where she was a member of Alpha Kappa Alpha and studied romance languages. She earned a master's degree in dance from New York University.

== Career ==
Williamson was a notable African-American dancer. She trained in ballet, modern, and jazz dance. She studied dance with Charles Weidman, Hanya Holm, Martha Hill, Huapala, Martha Graham, and Luigi.

In the 1950s, she performed in the New York City Center 1950s productions of Finian's Rainbow, Carmen Jones, and Faust. She danced in Cape May Playhouse's productions of The Follies of 1910 and The Boy Friend. She also made appearances with YMHA the Merry-Go-Rounders and appeared on The Jackie Gleason Show in 1953, where she performed in a production of Tawny. That same year, Williamson also made an appearance on the The Paul Winchell Show. In 1957, Williamson performed in a production of Green Pastures on NBC.

Williamson was a company member of Alvin Ailey American Dance Theater. In 1958, she performed Blues Suite as a member of Ailey's first company. She was also a solo dancer and nightclub cabaret act.

In 1973, she was the first artist-in-residence at Jacob's Pillow. During her residency, she choreographed The Many Faces of Jazz, a jazz dance piece set on sixty-five dancers.

She served on the faculty at Howard University, the Tuskegee Institute, Bennett College, and the Young Women's Christian Association of Springfield, Massachusetts. She also taught at Ethical Culture Fieldston School and the Dalton School.

== Personal life and death ==
She was married to William Elliott Williamson, whom she met at the Palmer Memorial Institute.

Williamson died on January 10, 1996 at Mount Sinai Hospital in Manhattan.
