= Musette Satterfield Kitchin =

First Lady of North Carolina (1909–1913)

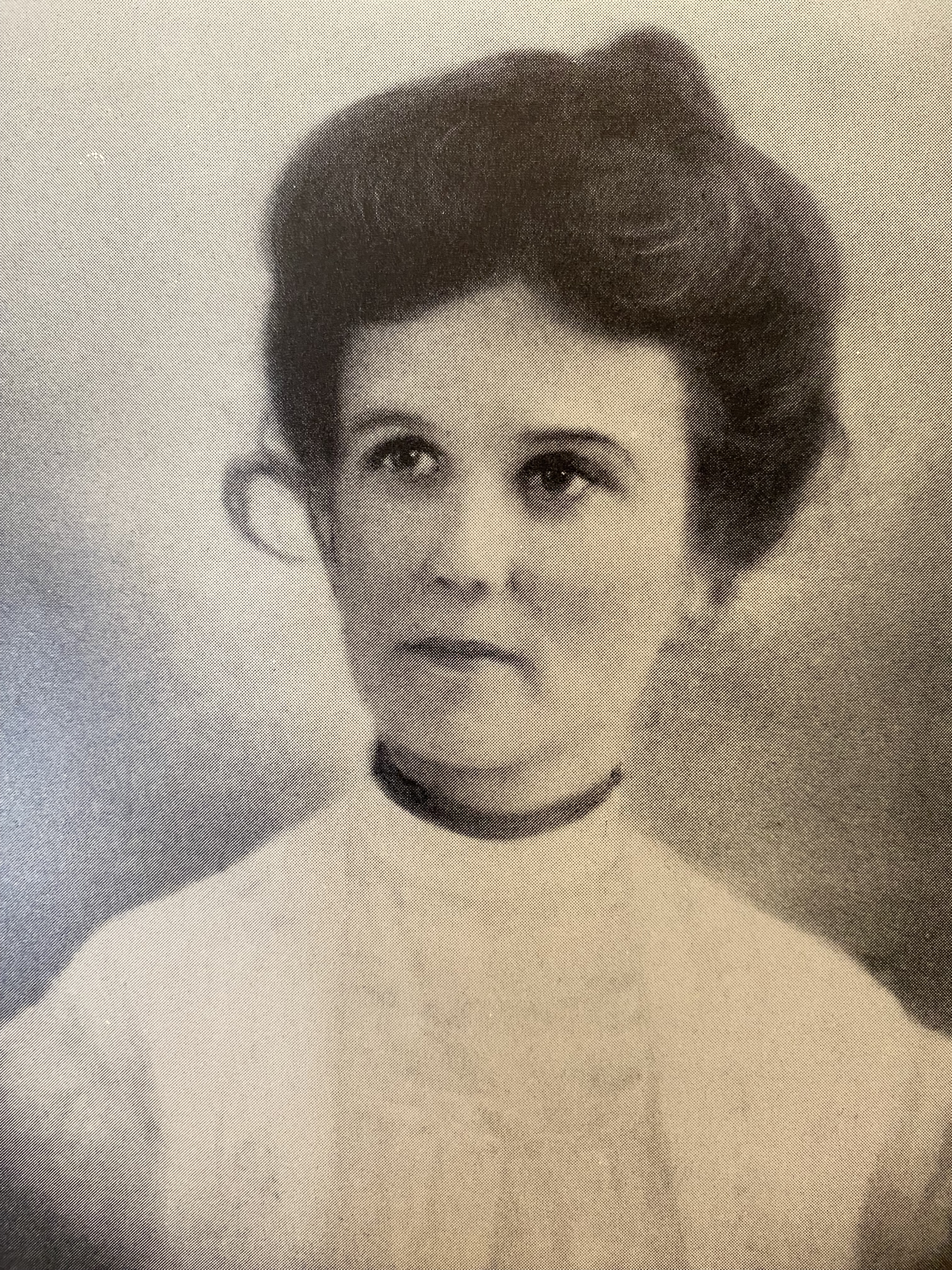

First Lady of North Carolina
- In office January 12, 1909 – January 15, 1913
- Governor: William Walton Kitchin
- Preceded by: Cornelia Deaderick Glenn
- Succeeded by: Annie Burgin Craig

Personal details
- Born: Sue Musette Satterfield; March 10, 1874 Roxboro, North Carolina, U.S.
- Died: November 4, 1956 (aged 82) Scotland Neck, North Carolina, U.S.
- Resting place: Baptist Cemetery
- Party: Democratic
- Spouse: William Walton Kitchin
- Children: 6
- Education: Greensboro Female College

Sue Musette Satterfield Kitchin (March 10, 1874 – November 4, 1956) was an American political hostess who, as the wife of Governor William Walton Kitchin, served as the first lady of North Carolina from 1909 to 1913. Kitchin was also the director of the Methodist Orphanage.

== Biography ==
Kitchin was born on March 10, 1874, in Roxboro, North Carolina, to William Clement Satterfield and Sue Temesia Norwood Satterfield.

She graduated from Greensboro Female College on May 28, 1891.

On 22 December 1892, she married William Walton Kitchin. They had six children: Sue Arrington, William Walton Jr., Anne Maria, Elizabeth Gertrude, Clement Satterfield, and Musette Satterfield. Kitchin took her children to opera performances and other arts performances.

From 1897 to 1909, she lived in Washington, D.C. while her husband served in the United States House of Representatives. She was a fashionable member of Washington society and always had her clothing tailored in Baltimore. In 1909, her husband became the 52nd Governor of North Carolina. As the state's first lady, Kitchin held "at home" days at the North Carolina Executive Mansion to encourage visits from the public. She was denied funds to refurbish the mansion as part of budget cuts made during her husband's administration. The North Carolina General Assembly approved an increased allowance, from $500 to $700, for the first family to entertain in the mansion and increased the monthly salary of the mansion's butler, "Uncle Dave". Because of these budgeting plans, Kitchin did not make any renovations or do any redecorating at the mansion, but did host many parties and events. She was able to purchase a piano and flat silver for the mansion. Two of her sisters lived with the family at the mansion, and one winter her brother-in-law also lived with them.

She was a Methodist but also attended Baptist services, as that was her husband's religion. She was active in the Scotland Neck Methodist Church, serving on the parish's board of stewards, and served as director of the Methodist Orphanage. The family lived in Scotland Neck and, prior to that, at a mansion in Person County.

Kitchin died on November 4, 1956, and was buried in the Baptist Cemetery in Scotland Neck, North Carolina.

Honorary titles
Preceded by Cornelia Deaderick Glenn	First Lady of North Carolina; 1909–1913	Succeeded by Annie Burgin Craig
