= Annie Burgin Craig =

First Lady of North Carolina (1913–1917)

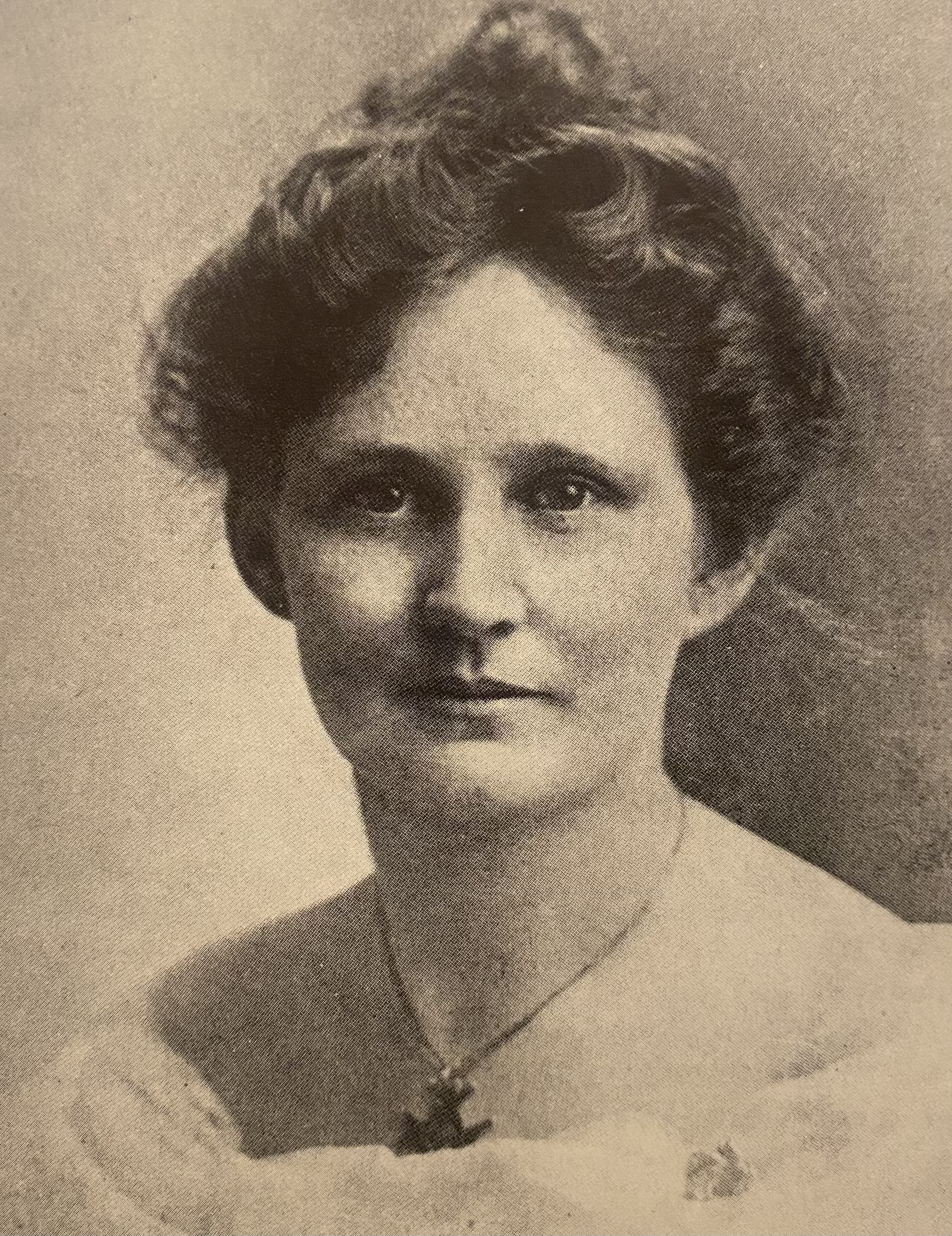

First Lady of North Carolina
- In office January 15, 1913 – January 11, 1917
- Governor: Locke Craig
- Preceded by: Musette Satterfield Kitchin
- Succeeded by: Fanny Yarborough Bickett

Personal details
- Born: February 15, 1873 Old Fort, North Carolina, U.S.
- Died: November 6, 1955 (aged 82) Asheville, North Carolina, U.S.
- Resting place: Riverside Cemetery
- Party: Democratic
- Spouse: Locke Craig
- Children: 4

Annie Burgin Craig (February 15, 1873 – November 6, 1955) was an American political hostess who, as the wife of Governor Locke Craig, served as the first lady of North Carolina from 1913 to 1917.

== Biography ==
Craig was born on February 15, 1873 to Captain Joseph B. Burgin, a Confederate States Army officer, and Margaret E. Burgin. She grew up on her family's farm at the foot of Black Mountain, near Old Fort, North Carolina.

On November 18, 1891, she married the attorney Locke Craig. They had four sons: Carlyle, George Winston, Arthur Burgin, and Locke Jr. The Craig family lived in Asheville, where her husband owned a law practice.

Her husband sat in the North Carolina House of Representatives from 1899 to 1901 and, in 1913, he became the governor of North Carolina. Addie Worth Bagley Daniels hosted a luncheon for Craig and her entourage from Western North Carolina to introduce her to the wives and members of the North Carolina General Assembly.

After their time in the executive mansion ended, she and her family purchased a house in Asheville along the Swannanoa River. It was here that she cared for her husband in the last seven years of his life, when he was in very poor health.

Craig was an accomplished and competitive bridge player, active in the congregation at First Presbyterian Church, and was a member of the Current Literature Club.

Craig died on November 6, 1955 and is buried next to her husband in Riverside Cemetery.

Honorary titles
Preceded by Musette Satterfield Kitchin	First Lady of North Carolina; 1913–1917	Succeeded by Fanny Yarborough Bickett
