= Governor William W. and Musette Satterfield Kitchin House =

Historic house in Roxboro, North Carolina

- Alternative names: Person County Museum of History

General information
- Status: Active
- Type: private residence
- Location: 309 N Main Street; Roxboro, North Carolina, U.S.
- Completed: 1901
- Owner: William Walton Kitchin (former); Person County Museum of History (current)

The Governor William W. and Musette Satterfield Kitchin House is a historic house in Roxboro, North Carolina. The house was the private residence of North Carolina governor William Walton Kitchin and Musette Satterfield Kitchin. It serves as the main building for the Person County Museum of History.

== History ==
The house was built in 1901 by Congressman William Walton Kitchin, who at the time was seated in the United States House of Representatives for North Carolina's 5th congressional district. He later served as Governor of North Carolina from 1909 to 1913. The Kitchin family lived at the house until they moved to Scotland Neck. The house's interior reflects Greek Revival, Italianate, and Colonial Revival elements. The staircase from the first floor foyer to the second floor includes an ornate, short handrail that was built to accommodate Kitchin's wife, Musette Satterfield Kitchin, who was around five feet tall.

The house is now the main building of the Person County Museum of History.

A historic marker was placed near the house at the intersection of North Main Street and West Morehead Street.
