= Locke Craig =

American politician

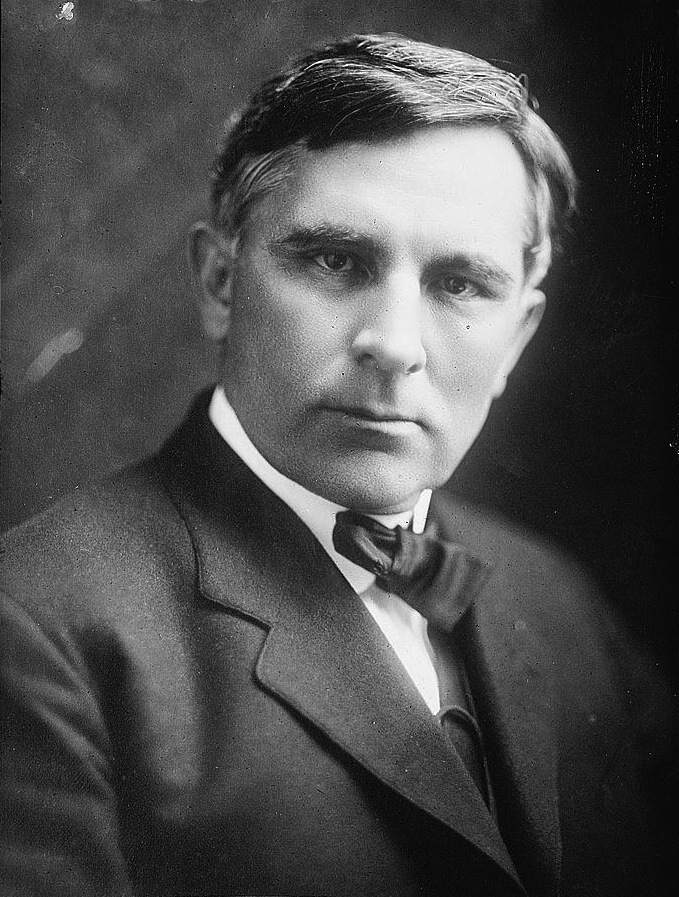

53rd Governor of North Carolina
- In office January 15, 1913 – January 11, 1917
- Lieutenant: Elijah L. Daughtridge
- Preceded by: William Walton Kitchin
- Succeeded by: Thomas Walter Bickett

Member of the North Carolina House of Representatives
- In office 1899–1901

Personal details
- Born: August 16, 1860 Bertie County, North Carolina, U.S.
- Died: June 9, 1924 (aged 63) Asheville, North Carolina, U.S.
- Party: Democratic
- Spouse: Annie Burgin
- Children: 4
- Education: University of North Carolina
- Profession: lawyer

Locke Craig (August 16, 1860 – June 9, 1924), an American lawyer and Democratic politician, was the 53rd governor of the U.S. state of North Carolina, serving from 1913 until 1917.

== Early and family life ==
Craig was born near Windsor, North Carolina, on August 16, 1860, to Baptist minister and farmer Andrew Murdock Craig and his second wife Clarissa Rebecca Gilliam. He was named for the Scottish philosopher John Locke. His paternal ancestors had emigrated from Scotland before the American Revolutionary War. By 1870, his elder half-brothers William Craig (b. 1835), Clenzman Craig (b.1841) and Andrew Craig Jr. (b.1848) had left home, and he and his youngest brother Braxton Craig were away at school. Craig attended Horner Military Academy in Granville County run by former Confederate officer James Horner. Following his father's death in 1874, his mother sold the family farm and moved with the 15 year old Locke to Chapel Hill. He graduated from the University of North Carolina at Chapel Hill (also his late father's alma mater in 1822) in 1880. Locke Craig taught chemistry at the university for one year, then studied law.

Craig married Annie Burgin (1873–1955) on November 18, 1892, in McDowell County, North Carolina. The couple had four sons: Capt. Carlyle Craig (1892–1971), George Winston Craig (1894–1985), Arthur Burgin Craig (1896– ) and Locke Craig (1914–1993). Two of the boys graduated from the U.S. Naval Academy at Annapolis, and George Craig would become a lawyer and member of the North Carolina General Assembly.

== Career ==
After admission to the North Carolina bar, Craig settled in Asheville in the state's mountainous western region. He served as Buncombe County attorney and the Asheville city corporation counsel.

In the 1890s, Craig became active in the local Democratic Party and served as a Democratic elector in 1892 and 1896, canvassing the state for Democratic presidential candidate William Jennings Bryan. He became known as an orator, despite his small physical stature, and was nicknamed "The Little Giant of the West" in tribute to former Democratic presidential candidate Stephen A. Douglas.

At the time, the other major political party in the state was known as the "Fusionists", a coalition of Populists and Republicans. The Fusionists won many offices in North Carolina in 1894, and controlled the state legislature in 1895 and 1897, as well as elected Republican Daniel L. Russell as the state's Governor in 1896. The other major Democratic orator in North Carolina at the time was fellow lawyer Charles Brantley Aycock of Goldsboro, son of Confederate state senator and slaveowner Benjamin Aycock and U.S. attorney for the Eastern District of North Carolina during the presidency of Democrat Grover Cleveland in 1893–1897. Although a strong supporter of education for blacks as well as whites, Aycock had refused to become the Fusionists' gubernatorial candidate in 1896. By 1898, Aycock and Craig were stressing white supremacy, enraged by the enlarged political role of African Americans in the Russell administration.

In 1899 Craig won election to the North Carolina House of Representatives and was re-elected in 1901. While a member of the North Carolina State House, Craig worked with Aycock on the state constitutional amendment that would effectively disfranchise African American voters. Aycock won election as North Carolina's governor in 1900. Meanwhile, Craig twice failed in attempts at higher office, losing in a bid for his party's nomination for the U.S. Senate in 1903 and in 1908 withdrew from his first run for the North Carolina governorship after three days of deadlock in the state's Democratic convention between his supporters and those of William Walton Kitchin (the eventual winner) and Ashley Horne. Finally winning the Democratic nomination in 1912 (by acclimation), Craig also won the general election in another three-way race and became North Carolina's governor, although his ally, former governor Aycock had died in April 1912 (suffering a heart attack while campaigning for the U.S. Senate seat).

During his time as governor, Craig continued Aycock's educational reforms. He also presided over other reforms and formed the state's first highway commission (5,000 miles of state-built roads in 1913 grew to 15,000 miles in 1917 and national recognition as the "Good Roads State") as well as established many forestry and fishery conservation policies. Gratifying North Carolinians enraged at the clearcutting of the state's forests by logging companies, Governor Craig and the legislature established Mount Mitchell State Park in 1915 (the state's first state park). He also served on the Appalachian Parks Commission, which promoted creation of the Pisgah National Forest. He also acted decisively when floods ravaged western North Carolina in 1916. Implementing a campaign promise to reduce freight rates to the level of the rest of the South, and harnessing electric power by building dams on the Yadkin, Catawba, French Broad and Cape Fear Rivers spurred the state's economic development. Craig also oversaw other improvements in western North Carolina. He also encouraged private contracts for prisoners to perform road and railroad labor, using a model which in 1880 had led to completion of the Western North Carolina Railroad to Swannanoa Gap (on the Buncombe/McDowell county line and the division between the Atlantic and Mississippi watersheds). After completing his term, Craig retired from public service and resumed his legal career.

== Death and legacy ==
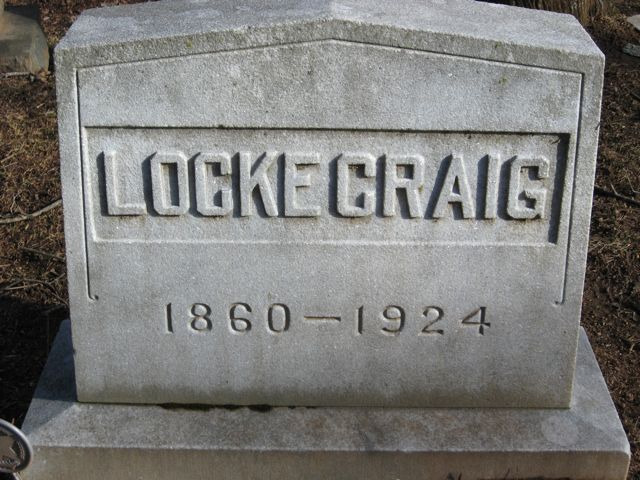
Gravesite of North Carolina Governor Locke Craig

The former governor built a new house on the Swannanoa River in Asheville, but suffered a debilitating illness in 1917 and lived as an invalid during his final seven years. Locke Craig died at the age of 63 on June 9, 1924, survived by his wife Annie, sons and grandchildren. He was buried in the Riverside Cemetery in the Montford Area Historic District, in Asheville, North Carolina, where Annie joined him 30 years later. His eldest son Carlyle had a military career, including service in World War II, and his second son George followed his father's path in law and politics through the mid-1950s. His youngest son, Locke Craig Jr., became a forester.

In 1944, a portrait of Governor Craig by Asheville artist Cuthbert Lee was unveiled in the state senate chamber in Raleigh. North Carolina named Mount Craig, the second highest peak in Pisgah National Forest, in his honor in 1947, and erected a historical marker near his Asheville home in 1949. Another marker notes his childhood home in Bertie County. Duke University's library holds his papers.

Party political offices
Preceded by William Walton Kitchin	Democratic nominee for Governor of North Carolina; 1912	Succeeded by Thomas Walter Bickett
Political offices
Preceded by William Walton Kitchin	Governor of North Carolina; 1913–1917	Succeeded by Thomas Walter Bickett
