= James H. Young =

American politician

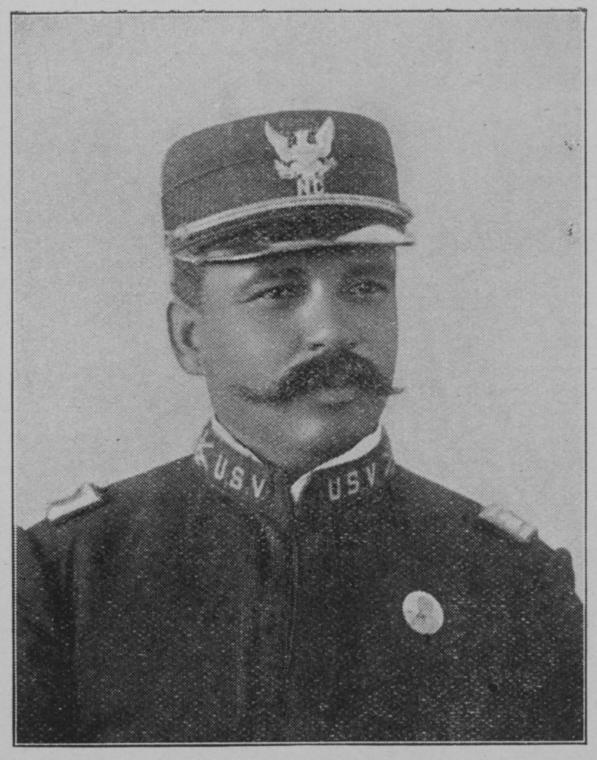

Member of the North Carolina House of Representatives
- In office 1894–1898

Personal details
- Born: October 26, 1858 near Henderson, North Carolina, United States
- Died: April 11, 1921 (aged 62) Raleigh, North Carolina, United States
- Party: Republican
- Relatives: Liz Williamson (granddaughter)
- Education: Shaw University
- Occupation: politician, soldier

James Hunter Young (October 26, 1858 – April 11, 1921) was an American soldier and politician from North Carolina. He was a colonel in the Third North Carolina Regiment during the Spanish–American War and served in the North Carolina House of Representatives.

== Early life and education ==
James Young was born on October 26, 1858, near Henderson, North Carolina, United States to an enslaved woman owned by Captain D. E. Young and a prominent white man in Vance County. His father oversaw his education, and Young attended school in Henderson before studying at Shaw University from 1874 to 1877. He was a classmate and friend of Dr. Manassa T. Pope.

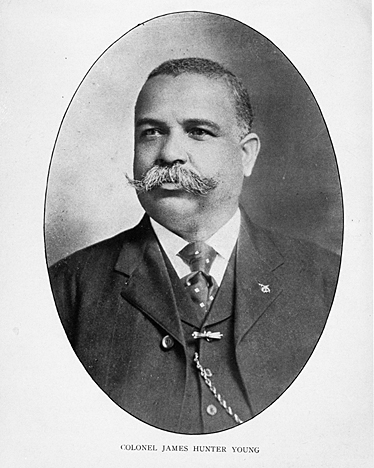
Young in 1919

== Career ==
He was hired to work in the office of Colonel J. J. Young, an internal revenue collector, in 1877. He was involved with the Republican Party and in 1883 was elected to the Raleigh board of aldermen, but the board, controlled by Democrats, had Young and three other black Republicans removed from office because they held federal government jobs.

President Benjamin Harrison nominated Young twice for the position of Collector of the Port of Wilmington but the U.S. Senate failed to confirm him.

As owner and editor of the Raleigh Gazette (then "the most popular black newspaper in the Piedmont region of North Carolina") from 1893 to 1898, Young helped organize the electoral fusion of the state's Republicans and Populists. He was elected to the North Carolina House of Representatives from Wake County on a Fusion ticket in 1894 and 1896. Historian Helen G. Edmonds called Young "the outstanding Negro in the state legislature during the Fusion period." He was vilified by the Democrats, who nevertheless acknowledged his intellect and political astuteness, which they attributed "to his white blood."

Young was an ally of Gov. Daniel L. Russell, who appointed him colonel of a black volunteer regiment organized for the Spanish–American War. The unit did not see action, but Young was believed to have been the first African American to hold the rank of colonel in the United States (Charles Young was the first black colonel in the regular United States Army). Newspapers such as Josephus Daniels's News and Observer mocked both Young and Russell in print and in cartoons. The members of Young's regiment clashed with local whites, when allowed to visit towns on weekend furloughs.

Young later received a federal appointment from Pres. William McKinley as deputy revenue collector for Raleigh, which he held from 1899 through 1913. He was also active in the Baptist church.

== Personal life and death ==
Young was the grandfather of dancer and choreographer Liz Williamson.

He died in Raleigh on April 11, 1921.

== Additional sources ==
- North Carolina Historical Marker
- "NO WHITE MAN WANTED.; THE FIGHT OVER A NORTH CAROLINA COLLECTORSHIP". The New York Times. March 30, 1891.
- "NORTH CAROLINA REPUBLICANS.; TWO FACTIONS AGAIN AT STRIFE IN WILMINGTON". The New York Times. September 8, 1891.
- A History of the Negro Baptists of North Carolina
- Pope House Museum
- Members of the African-American Third N.C. Regiment at their encampment near Macon, Georgia, 1899
- Zucchino, David (2020). Wilmington's Lie: The Murderous Coup of 1898 and the Rise of White Supremacy. Atlantic Monthly Press. ISBN 9780802128386.
