= Third North Carolina Regiment (1898–1899) =

Black Regiment

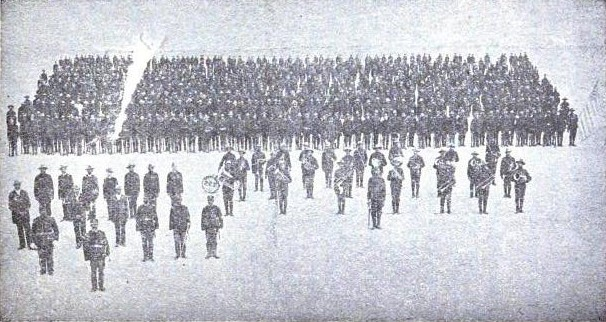
Third North Carolina Regiment

The Third North Carolina Regiment was a United States military unit composed of African American troops from North Carolina mustered into federal service in the Spanish–American War. The unit did not see active service in conflict and spent most of its existence in camps in North Carolina, Tennessee, and Georgia.

== Background ==
African American communities expressed mixed feelings about the Spanish–American War in 1898, especially determining whether black Americans should volunteer for the war effort. The racial discrimination and violence their communities faced under Reconstruction era conflict and Jim Crow laws dissuaded many African Americans from serving in the War. Others, including African American community leaders in Wilmington, North Carolina, saw the war as an opportunity to demonstrate bravery and patriotism to white Americans. Following the American Civil War, most black military units in North Carolina were disbanded at the behest of whites; in 1898, there was only a single 40-man black unit in the State Guard, the Charlotte Light Infantry. President of the United States William McKinley called upon citizens to volunteer to serve, and the federal government set recruitment quotas for states so that volunteer units could be created. Within the formal United States Army, black men were restricted to service in four segregated regiments under white officers or in labor-intensive roles such as cooks and custodians. Thus, many saw opportunities for social progress by forming African American volunteer units.

North Carolina elected a Republican, Daniel Lindsay Russell, in 1896 under the strategic movement Fusionism organized by a coalition of Republicans and Populists. Black Republican voters played a significant role in this strategy. Some Black North Carolinians who had created informal militia units upon the outbreak of the Spanish-American War asked Russell to incorporate them into the state's federal service programs. The United States Department of War requested that North Carolina muster two white infantry regiments and a battery of artillery. Mindful of the political debt he owed to his African American constituents, Russell sent one of his advisers, J. C. L. Harris, to Washington D.C. to persuade the War Department to either swap the artillery battery with a black infantry battalion or accept the creation of an all-black regiment. United States Senator Marion Butler, a Fusionist, attempted to persuade white officials to support the scheme by arguing that black men could "stand the climate of Cuba and are anxious to enlist". The department officially refused to alter its requested quota, and North Carolinian Fusionists including Washington Recorder of Deeds Henry P. Cheatham, Congressman George Henry White, and Senator Jeter Connelly Pritchard joined in the effort and lobbied the president for his assent.

== Service ==
=== Creation ===
Russell eventually prevailed on the federal authorities to swap the artillery battery for a black infantry battalion. On April 27, 1898, he announced the creation of the battalion and placed it under the command of James H. Young, a prominent black political ally of the governor, who was given the rank of major. Black newspapers across the country praised Russell for the unit's creation, in particular highlighting his decision to place it under the charge of a black officer. The unit was given the nickname "Russell's Black Battalion". Meanwhile, Harris encouraged the governor to increase the unit to regiment strength, telling him that McKinley and Secretary of War Russell A. Alger wanted North Carolina to muster a full black regiment but would "not say so officially". Harris further warned him that his failure to do so would cost him political support. Thus advised, when McKinley re-appealed to the American public for volunteers in May, Russell announced that he was transforming the battalion into a regiment.

The governor ordered Young to recruit an additional seven companies of troops which would be merged with his battalion to form the Third North Carolina Infantry, United States Volunteers. Young was flooded with requests to enlist while one of the white units raised struggled to fill its ranks. Once the additional companies were mustered, the regiment was consolidated in Raleigh and dispatched by rail to Fort Macon for training. Though he faced pressure to name white officers to the unit, on June 28 Russell announced an all-black group of officers for the regiment. Young remained in charge and was promoted to colonel, while C. S. L. A. Taylor of the Charlotte Light Infantry was made his deputy as a lieutenant colonel. This made North Carolina one of only three states to create a black-officered regiment for the war. The regiment comprised 1,108 men and officers. Some of the soldiers gifted Harris a silver tea set as thanks for his work to create the regiment.

=== Political effects ===
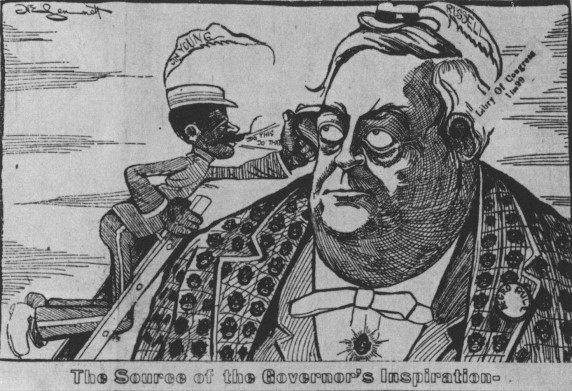
News & Observer political cartoon depicting Governor Daniel L. Russell as a stooge of Colonel Young and black voters

In an attempt to dislodge the Fusionist coalition from North Carolina's government in the elections of 1898, the Democratic Party engaged in a white supremacist campaign which decried "Negro domination". Democratic newspapers criticized Russell for giving African Americans guns, accused him of making the officers' appointments due to political rather than military considerations, and stated that he doted on his "pet regiment" with favoritism. Josephus Daniels, editor of the Raleigh News & Observer, conceded that Young was an "intelligent Raleigh mulatto" but decried him and his men as "Russel's birds of prey." Daniels singled out Young for criticism, accusing him of sabotaging efforts to deploy the regiment to Cuba for garrison duty so that he could remain within traveling distance of Raleigh to attend to political affairs. North Carolina Adjutant-General Andrew D. Cowles, a Republican, also stated in an interview that news of the heavy casualties at the Siege of Santiago had led a significant amount of the regiment's initial volunteers to back out of their enlistment due to "downright cowardice." Black leaders rebuked his statement by pointing out that the army's regular black units had fought during the battle and highlighting the struggle to find enough white volunteers in the state.

=== Training ===
At Fort Macon, the troops were put to training and drilling. The regiment's officers were mindful that, as a colored formation, the unit would be subject to intensive scrutiny. Despite this, misconduct and disciplinary issues affected the regiment as much as other volunteer units. The end of fighting in Cuba by the midsummer of 1898 negatively impact morale of the soldiers' who had anticipated service in conflict and now thought that at best they would perform garrison duty in captured territory. The ranks increasingly filed complaints against their officers for being too demanding of them. Fort Macon was more isolated than other military installations in North Carolina, but soldiers were given leave to visit nearby cities such as Wilmington, New Bern, and Morehead City. White residents of those towns were unnerved by the black soldiers' presence and their demands for "equal treatment". The Morehead Pilot reported that the actions of the troops within the city once nearly created a race riot which was narrowly avoided due to the intervention of authorities.

On September 17, the Third Regiment was transferred to Camp Poland outside of Knoxville, Tennessee and formed a brigade there with the Sixth Virginia Volunteers, a black regiment under white officers, and a white regiment from Ohio. Also present at the camp was the First Georgia Volunteers, a white unit that was due to be mustered out soon. Relations between the Georgians and North Carolinians were tense, with the former tossing rocks at the latter during drill exercises and firing on them if they went into the woods near the camp. As a result, an Ohio company was ordered to protect the Third Regiment. Even after the First Georgia was disbanded, complaints about incidents of misconduct were ascribed to the North Carolinians, since most whites believed that a unit with black officers could not maintain discipline. The white-officered Sixth Virginia Volunteers thus avoided complaints. At Young's request, the Sixth Virginia was shifted into a different brigade and complaints about misconduct thereafter declined.

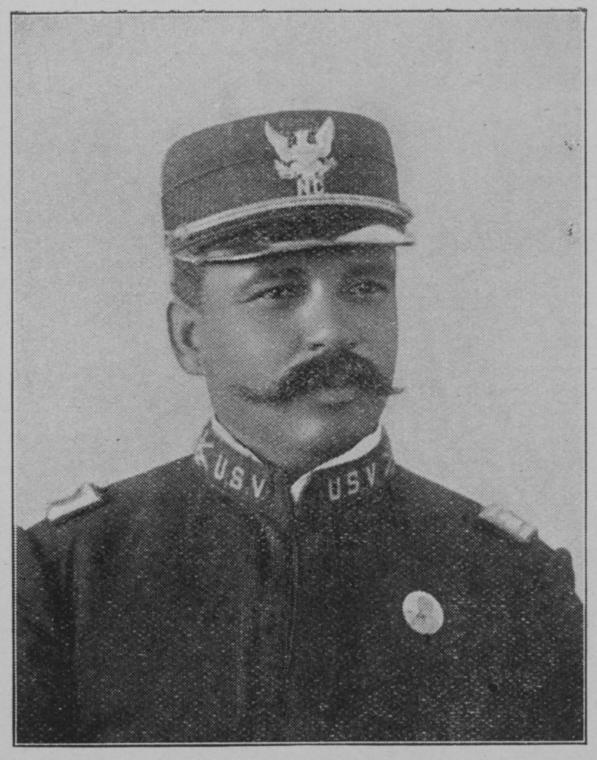
Colonel James H. Young served as commander of the Third North Carolina Regiment. Soldiers complained about his demands for strict discipline.

Knoxville newspapers were initially critical of the Third Regiment in its first weeks at Camp Poland, though in time they came to appreciate its drilling and the behavior of its soldiers visiting the city. The Knoxville Journal reported, "The men realize that their actions are watched closely and it is their desire to so conduct themselves as to gain the confidence and respect of every one with whom they come in contact as true soldiers." Nevertheless, the morale of the unit continued to suffer, as soldiers griped about the rigid discipline demanded by Young. Camp Poland also lacked adequate supplies and clean water, which Young reported to his superior, General Thomas L. Rosser. In October it was announced that the Third Regiment would be transferred to Camp Haskell near Macon, Georgia. Disgruntled by racial atmosphere in Georgia and the Deep South, some soldiers began to hope the unit would be posted to Cuba as a way of avoiding discrimination. Morale dipped further after the Democrats won significant victories in North Carolina's state elections in early November. This was shortly followed by the Wilmington massacre on November 10, which was committed with the complicity of the Wilmington Light Infantry, a white unit already released from federal duty.

The Third Regiment left Camp Poland for Georgia on November 23. The North Carolinians constituted part of the 4,000 black volunteers stationed at the camp, which became a significant grievance for local whites. Local white newspapers and the Governor of Georgia complained that the black troops were poorly-behaved and stoked violence, but most criticism was targeted at the Third Regiment due to its black leadership. The Atlanta Journal wrote, "A tougher and more turbulent set of Negroes were probably never gotten together before." President of the Raleigh-based Shaw University Charles F. Meserve was intrigued by the negative press and decided to travel to Camp Poland unannounced in late December to ascertain the situation. Many of the soldiers and officers were themselves former students at Shaw with whom he was personally acquainted. Meserve toured the Third Regiment's quarters and interviewed white staff officers at the camp. He reported that the barracks were "well nigh perfect" in terms of cleanliness, that Young forbade the serving of alcohol at the canteen, and wrote that the white provost marshal, Major John A. Logan Jr., had thought well of the unit's disciplinary situation. Captain J. C. Gresham, a white Virginian, said that "he had never met a more capable man than Colonel Young." Despite Meserve's assessment, white criticism of the regiment in the press continued. Four soldiers were murdered by white Georgians, who were all excused in court for justifiable homicide.

=== Disbanding ===
In January 1899 it was announced that the Third Regiment would be mustered out of service. The soldiers were discharged in the first week of February and sent via train from Macon to Raleigh. Macon authorities told Atlanta leaders that the black veterans were likely to cause trouble, so on the day of their arrival in Atlanta a large contingent of police officers surrounded the train station. They boarded the cars in search of a reported "ringleader" and in the process beat many soldiers on the head with clubs. The one civilian passenger on the train reported that there were no problems with civil order before the police arrived.

== Aftermath ==
Edward A. Johnson, a black alderman of Raleigh, requested that the now Democrat-dominated North Carolina General Assembly pass a resolution to honor black soldiers who had done "their duty under the flag". The request was ignored, and in 1899 the legislature instead legally barred African American men from serving in the State Guard. The body also struck Young's name from the cornerstone of a state school for the mentally ill, blind, and deaf he had advocated for when he was a legislator. The following year the General Assembly amended the state constitution in such a manner which effectively disenfranchised most black voters. Young was hired by the federal government as a deputy revenue collector, while five other former officers of the Third Regiment joined all-black units which fought in the Philippine–American War. Several decades after the Spanish–American War, Josephus Daniels conceded that the men of the regiment "made much better soldiers than anybody expected".

== Works cited ==
- Gatewood, Willard B. (October 1971). "North Carolina's Negro Regiment in the Spanish-American War". The North Carolina Historical Review. 48 (4): 370–387. JSTOR 23518178.
- Glasrud, Bruce A., ed. (2011). Brothers to the Buffalo Soldiers: Perspectives on the African American Militia and Volunteers, 1865-1917 (revised ed.). University of Missouri Press. ISBN 9780826272300.
- Zucchino, David (2021). Wilmington's Lie: The Murderous Coup of 1898 and the Rise of White Supremacy. New York: Grove Press. ISBN 978-0-8021-4865-0.
