= The Caucasian (newspaper) =

North Carolina newspaper

The Caucasian (1884–1913) also published as The Daily Caucasian in 1895, was a newspaper in North Carolina which operated from 1884 to 1913. Established as a Democratic Party aligned paper, it became Populist with the era of fusion politics. The paper relocated several times including to Raleigh, the state capitol.

== History ==
The Caucasian was founded in 1884 as a weekly newspaper in Clinton, North Carolina which promoted the local Democratic Party. In 1888, schoolteacher Marion Butler became editor of the publication and used it to promote the views of the Farmers' Alliance. In 1893, the paper's printing facility was burned, and Marion moved it to Goldsboro to expand readership.

In 1894, Populists and Republicans, working as a fusionist coalition, took control of the North Carolina General Assembly and elected Butler, a Populist, to serve as a U.S. Senator. Butler then moved the paper's offices to the state capital, Raleigh, and it printed weekly editions for there as well as Clinton and Goldsboro. With a competitive market for advertising in Raleigh, Butler bolstered the newspaper's operations with his own money and by incorporating the Caucasian Publishing Company and selling its stock to investors.

In January 1895, Butler arranged for the paper to introduce a supplemental edition in the capital, the Raleigh Daily Caucasian, making the Caucasian the only Populist-led paper to ever publish daily in the South. He further expanded the paper's circulation during the 1895 state legislative session to promote the Populist Party. During this time the paper struggled with financial problems, as adverse economic conditions limited the number of businesses willing to advertise with the paper, and some of the policies advocated by the Populists alienated others. Due to the lack of money, the board of directors to temporarily suspend operations at the end of the session, with the last daily edition being issued on March 13. On March 28, Butler merged the Goldsboro edition into the Raleigh edition. As he prepared to depart for Washington D.C. to serve in the U.S. Senate, he chose Hal W. Ayer to serve as the paper's managing editor. The paper's circulation peaked in the mid-1890s with over 10,000 subscribers.

The paper reported on the Wilmington massacre of 1898. It opposed disenfranchisement legislation proposed by Democrats in the state from 1898 to 1900. The Populist Party collapsed after 1900, and after 1904 The Caucasian usually endorsed Republican candidates. In 1912, it backed the Progressive Party. It ceased publication in early 1913 due to financial problems.

== See also ==
- North Carolina People's Party
- List of defunct newspapers of North Carolina

== Works cited ==
- Beeby, James M. (2008). Revolt of the Tar Heels: The North Carolina Populist Movement, 1890-1901. University Press of Mississippi. ISBN 9781604733242.
- Hunt, James L. (2003). Marion Butler and American Populism. Chapel Hill: University of North Carolina Press. ISBN 9780807862506.
