= C. S. L. A. Taylor =

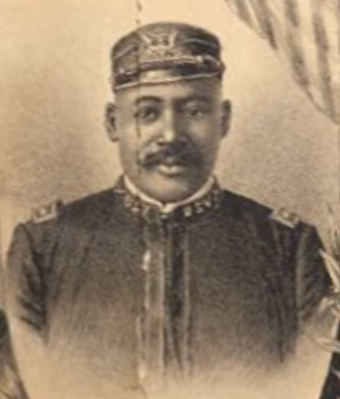
- Born: late 1840s or early 1850s South Carolina, U.S.
- Died: November 17, 1934 (aged 84–85); Charlotte, North Carolina, U.S.
- Spouse(s): Augusta Wheeler (m. 1869; died 1904) Ella Louise Pickens (m. 1905)
- Children: 5 (Note: Also assumed custody of James Franklin Richardson)
- Military career
- Allegiance: United States
- Branch: North Carolina National Guard
- Service years: 1887–1907
- Rank: Lieutenant Colonel
- Commands: 3rd North Carolina Volunteer Infantry Regiment
- Conflicts: Spanish–American War
- Other work: Barber, ballroom dancer, firefighter

Charles Samuel Lafayette Alexander Taylor, commonly known as C. S. L. A. Taylor was an American lieutenant colonel and firefighter of the North Carolina National Guard. He was known for being one of the first black colonels during the Spanish–American War, serving as deputy commander of the 3rd North Carolina Volunteer Infantry Regiment. He was also known as a major figure within the Charlotte firefighters.

== Childhood ==
Taylor was born in the late 1840s or early 1850s as a slave within South Carolina. (Note: Other sources state that he was born at North Carolina and was born in 1854 or 1859) For most of his childhood, he was enslaved at Union County, North Carolina and worked as a shoemaker. During the American Civil War, the Confederate contract forced Taylor to continue working on shoes, primarily making them out of either cloth or wood due to the leather shortage.

== Reconstruction ==
After the war, Taylor studied at several Quaker schools and opened up a barber shop at East Trade Street, Charlotte. During this time, he also served as a fireman as he served as the secretary of the Neptune Volunteer Fire Company which consisted of former slaves and freedmen. He eventually served in numerous state and national fire service organizations, becoming the Financial Secretary of the North Carolina Colored Volunteer Firemen’s Association on May 12, 1891, and would hold that office for 18 years before assuming presidency in the late 1920s and continued to involve himself in the organization until his death. He gained enough prominence within Charlotte that from May 4, 1885, to May 2, 1887, he served as an alderman representing the third ward of the city. He also served as a ballroom dancer, teaching ballroom dancing to white women within Charlotte.

== Military career ==
Taylor was also involved in military service as he organized an all-black unit of the Charlotte Light Infantry within the North Carolina National Guard in 1887 and served as captain of the unit. Upon the outbreak of the Spanish–American War, the unit became absorbed into the Third North Carolina Regiment and was assigned to Company A of the regiment on April 1, 1898. Taylor was later promoted to Lieutenant Colonel of the regiment. On June 28, Taylor was promoted to the rank of lieutenant colonel and made the second-in-command of the regiment.

== Personal life ==
He married twice in his life as he initially married Augusta Wheeler in 1869 and would have three sons with her but after her death in 1904, Taylor married Ella Louise Pickens in 1905 and would have an extra two daughters with her. They also assumed custody of James Franklin Richardson who was the general assemblyman and North Carolina state senator within Mecklenburg County, North Carolina. Taylor was a member of the Independent Order of Odd Fellows, the Benevolent and Protective Order of Elks and was a freemason.

== Works cited ==
- Gatewood, Willard B. (October 1971). "North Carolina's Negro Regiment in the Spanish-American War". The North Carolina Historical Review. 48 (4): 370–387. JSTOR 23518178.
