= Montford Area Historic District =

Historic district in North Carolina, United States

- U.S. National Register of Historic Places
- U.S. Historic district
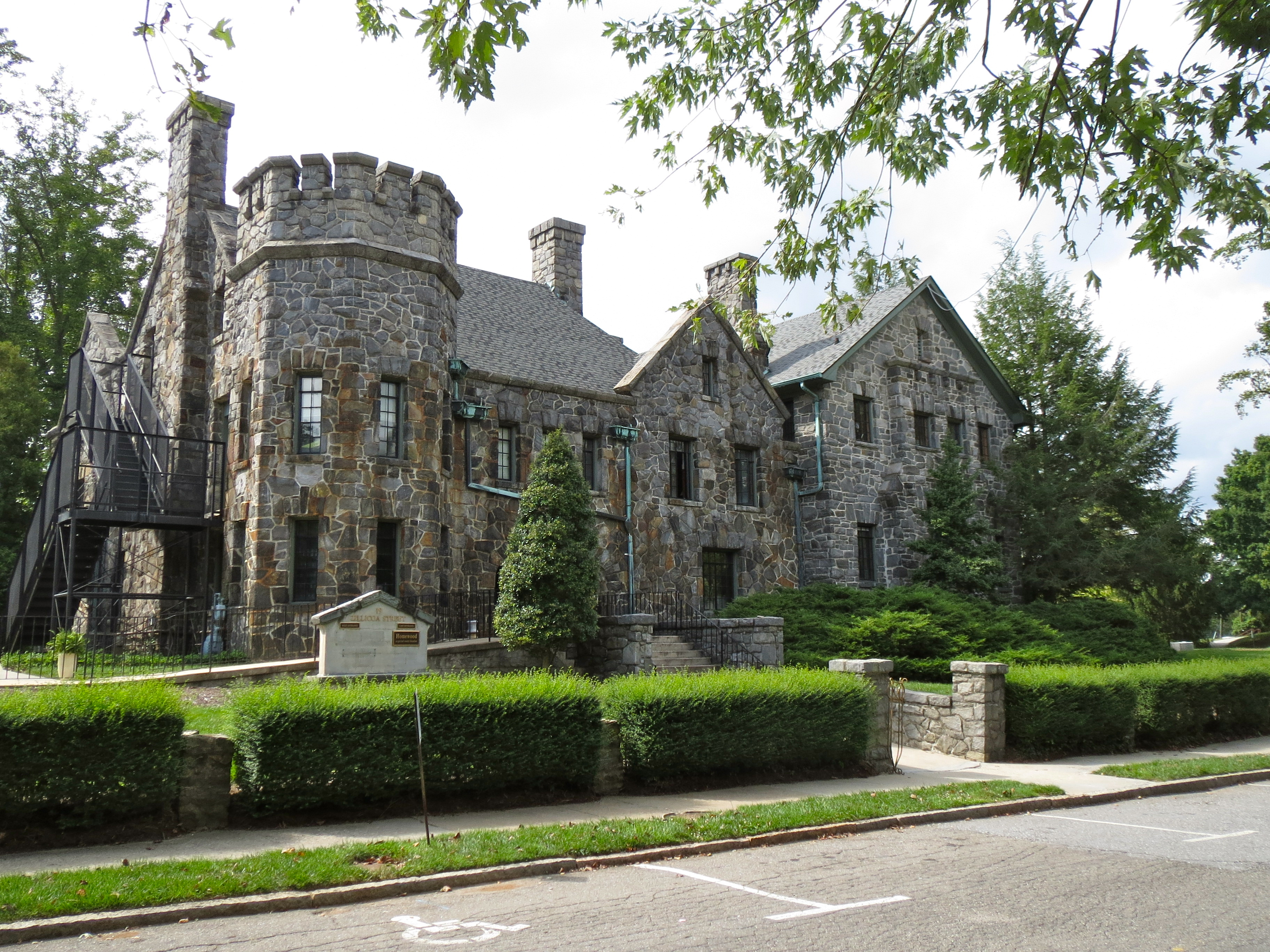
- Homewood School Building

- Location within North Carolina Location within the United States
- Location: Irregular pattern along Montford Ave., Asheville, North Carolina
- Coordinates: 35°36′10″N 82°33′53″W
- Built: 1848
- Architect: Smith, Richard Sharp; et al.
- Architectural style: Queen Anne, Shingle Style, Colonial Revival;Bungalow
- NRHP reference No.: 77000991
- Added to NRHP: November 25, 1977

The Montford Area Historic District is a mainly residential neighborhood in Asheville, North Carolina that is included in the National Register of Historic Places.

== History ==
According to the National Park Service the origin of the name Montford is unknown. In 1893, Montford was incorporated as an autonomous village to the north of Asheville. This was a tiny community of about 50 people, mainly local businessmen and their families.

In 1889 the Asheville Loan, Construction, and Improvement Company began to develop the neighborhood. The firm purchased and subdivided tracts of undeveloped land north of Battery Park and sold lots. The enterprise languished until it was taken over by George Willis Pack, a lumber tycoon from the midwest who moved to Asheville in 1885. He is best known today as a philanthropist and benefactor of the Asheville Library and principal public square. He also donated land for Montford Park on the southern end of Montford Avenue.

In 1905 the village of Montford was annexed to the city, and though a few structures survived from the original village, Montford lost its autonomous identity. Today, Montford is bounded by U.S. Routes 19/23, I-240, and Broadway St.

Most of the district's 600 buildings—primarily residences—were constructed between 1890 and 1920. The people who bought lots and built in the Montford area in its building prime were for the most part middle class individuals who carried out the day-to-day activities of the city—businessmen, lawyers, doctors, and a few architects. Several residents found immortality in Thomas Wolfe's autobiographical Look Homeward, Angel. Early city directories indicate a mixed population of working class citizens and highly paid professionals, both whites and blacks.

Though predominantly single family homes, land use in Montford has been mixed since the earliest days of development. The old Highland Hospital, located off the northern end of Montford Avenue, was the scene of a deadly fire in 1948. Among the victims was Zelda Fitzgerald, wife of F. Scott Fitzgerald.

The homes in the neighborhood represent an amalgam of architectural styles including Victorian, Queen Anne, Arts and Crafts, Neoclassical, and Colonial Revival. Also common are homes built to resemble castles. The neighborhood was added to the National Register of Historic Places in 1977.

In 1977, much of the Montford neighborhood was designated as a Historic District and listed in the National Register of Historic Places. In 1981 the Asheville City Council designated the Montford Historic District a local historic district, as well.

Today the Montford community is home to several homes and businesses including many bed and breakfasts.

== Architecture ==
Montford is popularly called a "Victorian" neighborhood. While some of these architectural features do abound in Montford, the term does not do full justice to the neighborhood's complex overall character, which is that of a late and post-Victorian suburb. The architects and builders of Montford were strongly influenced by a variety of progressive styles and design ideas that were emerging nationally in the late nineteenth and early twentieth century.

The neighborhood mirrors in subtle ways Asheville's cosmopolitan character at the turn of the century. Artistic influences in the town, including details from national architectural trendsetters like Bruce Price, Bernard Maybeck, Frank Lloyd Wright, and others exist in Montford houses, but were relatively unknown in other parts of the state.

The Rankin House at 192 Elizabeth Street is Montford's oldest home, a Greek Revival style residence built around 1846 with Italianate embellishments.

When Montford's development began full force in 1889, the dominant building fashion around the country was what is generally called the Queen Anne style. This was a building mode with many variations, but one generally characterized by irregular, complex massing and rooflines, corner turrets or towers, a mixture of surface textures, and a lavish use of ornamental devices.

The arrival of English architect Richard Sharp Smith to Asheville in the late nineteenth century profoundly affected the city's subsequent architectural development. Best known as supervising architect for the Biltmore House, Smith opened an office afterwards and a few homes in Montford can be directly traced to him. His favorite motifs were gambrel roofs, hipped gables, pebbledash or stucco walls, heavy porch brackets and simple Colonial Revival details.

The use of shingles, stone, stucco, earth colors and informal composition became an established tradition in Montford.

Among the most numerous and most important houses in the district are those executed in the Shingle style. This prevalence reflects both the prosperity of the town and the presence of architects and clients acquainted with this fashionable trend.

A variety of houses in Montford are in the Colonial Revival style, which became popular in the first few decades of the twentieth century. The earliest examples of this style have an informal quality, and are identified chiefly through the use of the gambrel roof and shingle wall coverings.

The Montford Hills sub-division of Montford, developed in the mid to late 1920s, incorporates designs found in Montford's original homes.

== Highland Hospital ==
In addition to residential buildings, the historic Highland Hospital was located in Montford. Originally named 'Dr. Carroll's Sanitorium' after Asheville psychiatrist Robert S. Carroll, was located in Montford in 1909 and renamed Highland Hospital in 1912. The campus included Dr. Carroll's home, where jazz singer Nina Simone studied piano with Carroll's wife. In 1939, Carroll gave the hospital to Duke University's Neuropsychiatric Department.

The hospital is best known for a 1948 fire in which Zelda Fitzgerald died along with eight other patients. Duke sold the property in the 1980s, and it was the home office for Genova Diagnostics until the corporate offices moved to Nettlewood in 2013. Highland Hall (as it is now called) is currently a stop on the Asheville Historic Trolley Tours.

== Riverside Cemetery ==
The district also includes the 87-acre (350,000 m^{2}) Riverside Cemetery, established in 1885. Thirteen thousand people are buried in the cemetery. The cemetery is the final resting place of a wide cross-section of prominent Carolinians: authors Thomas Wolfe and William Sydney Porter (better known by his pseudonym O. Henry); former North Carolina governor and Senator Zebulon Baird Vance and his two wives, Harriett Newell Espy Vance and Florence Steele Martin Vance; Philanthropist Ella Henrietta Davidson Morrison; Farmer and slave owner Mira Margaret Baird Vance, Senator Jeter Connelly Pritchard; Governor Locke Craig and his wife Annie Burgin Craig; Confederate generals Robert B. Vance, James Green Martin and Thomas Lanier Clingman; Lillian Exum Clement, first woman elected to the North Carolina state legislature; Loula Roberts Platt, suffragist and first woman to run for a seat in the North Carolina Senate; and George Masa, a photographer known for documenting the Blue Ridge Mountains. The Asheville Cemetery Company established the cemetery not only for that purpose but also to serve as a park. The city took it over in 1952.

=== Riverside Cemetery gallery ===
A few of the many images of the Cemetery on Wikimedia:

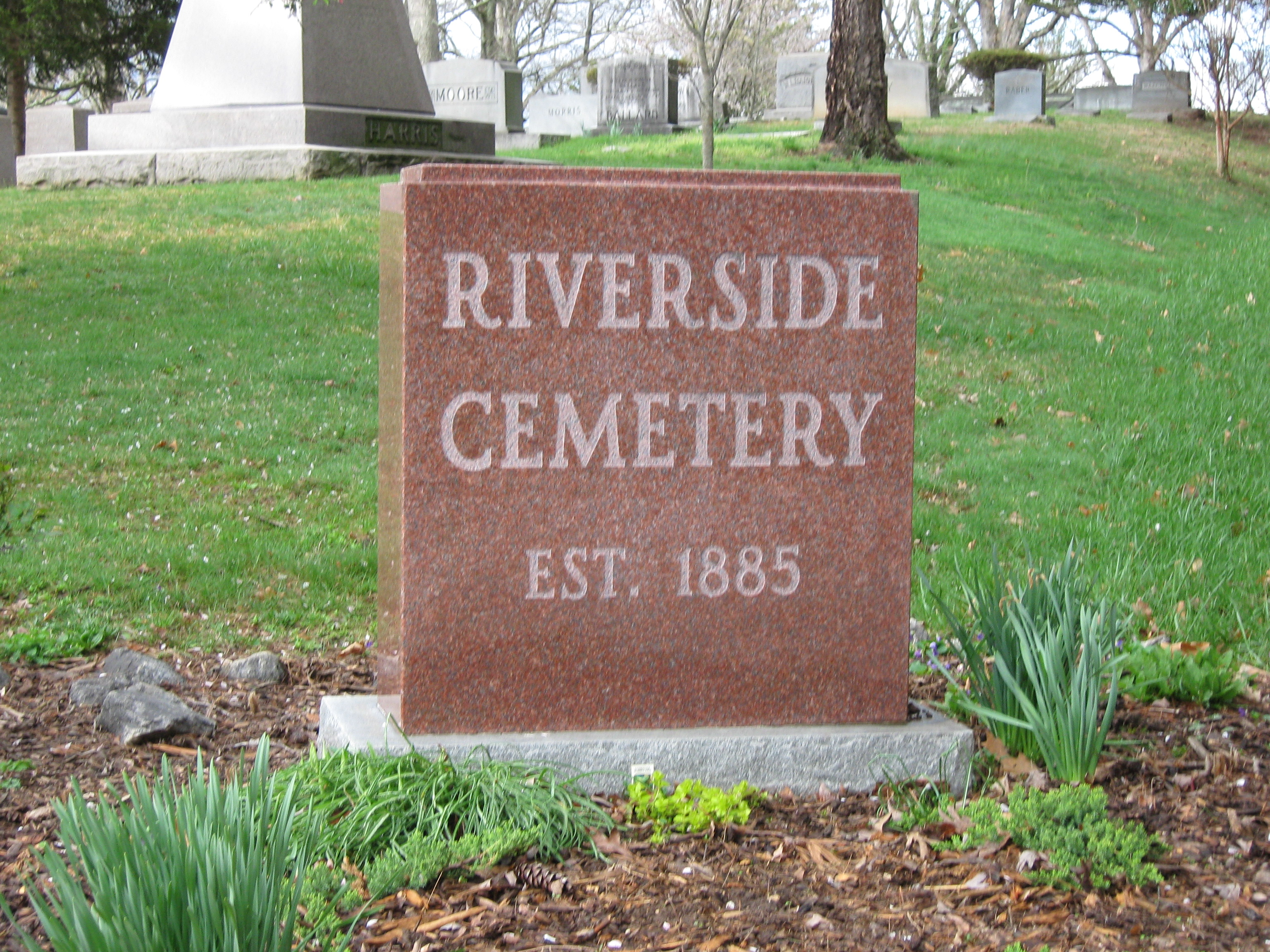
Riverside Cemetery Sign, 2009

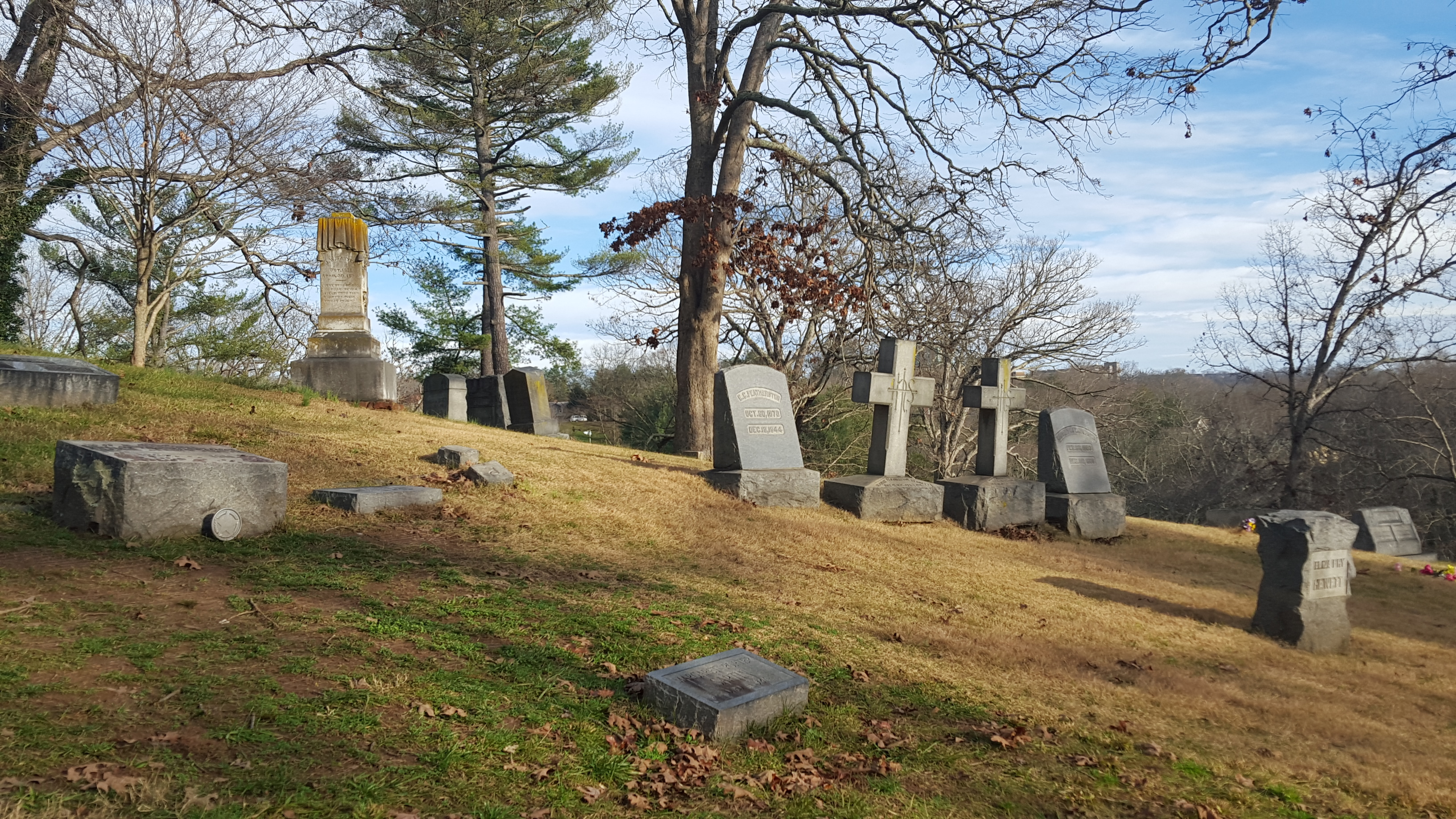
2015

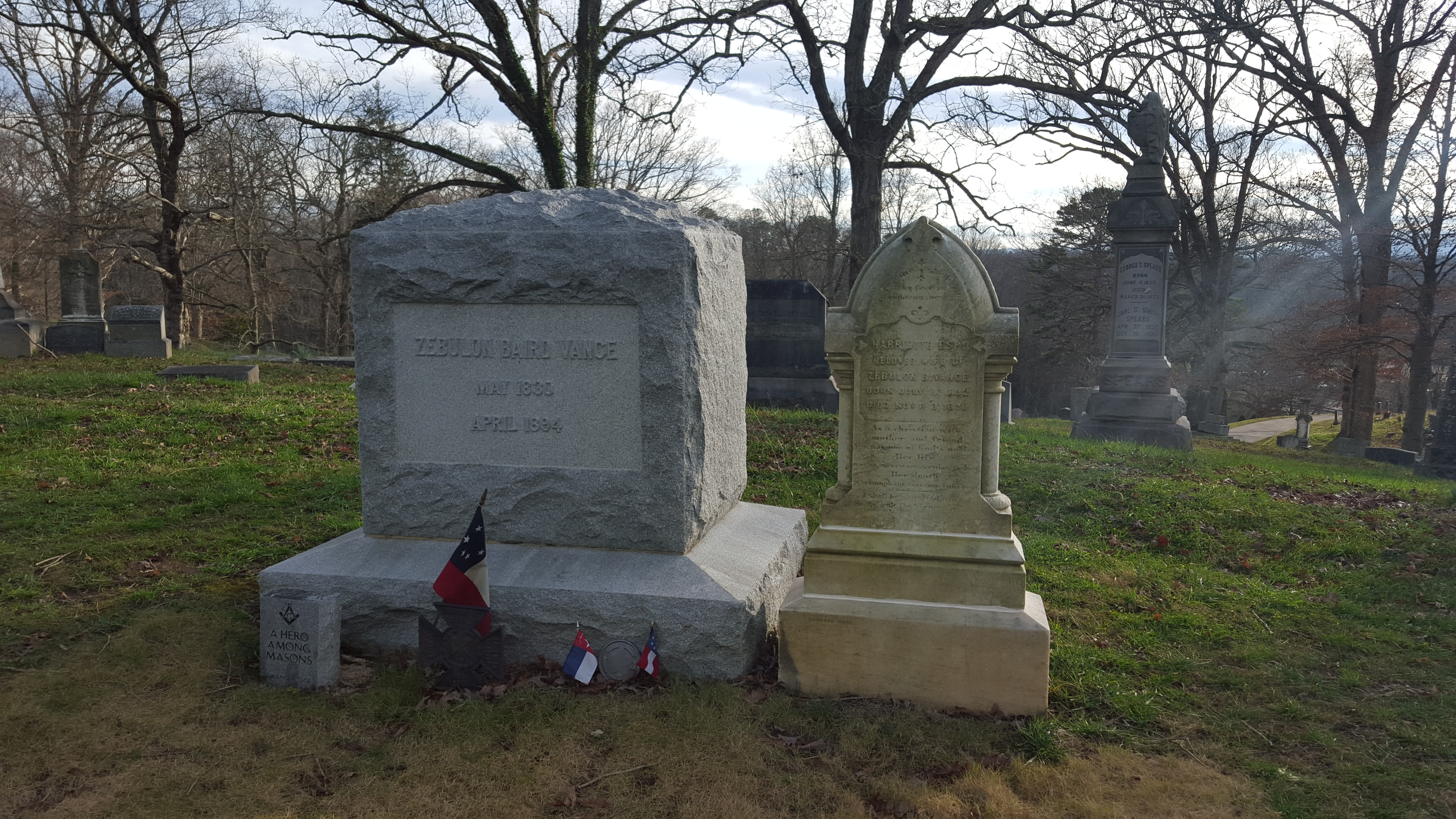
Zebulon Vance Grave, 2015

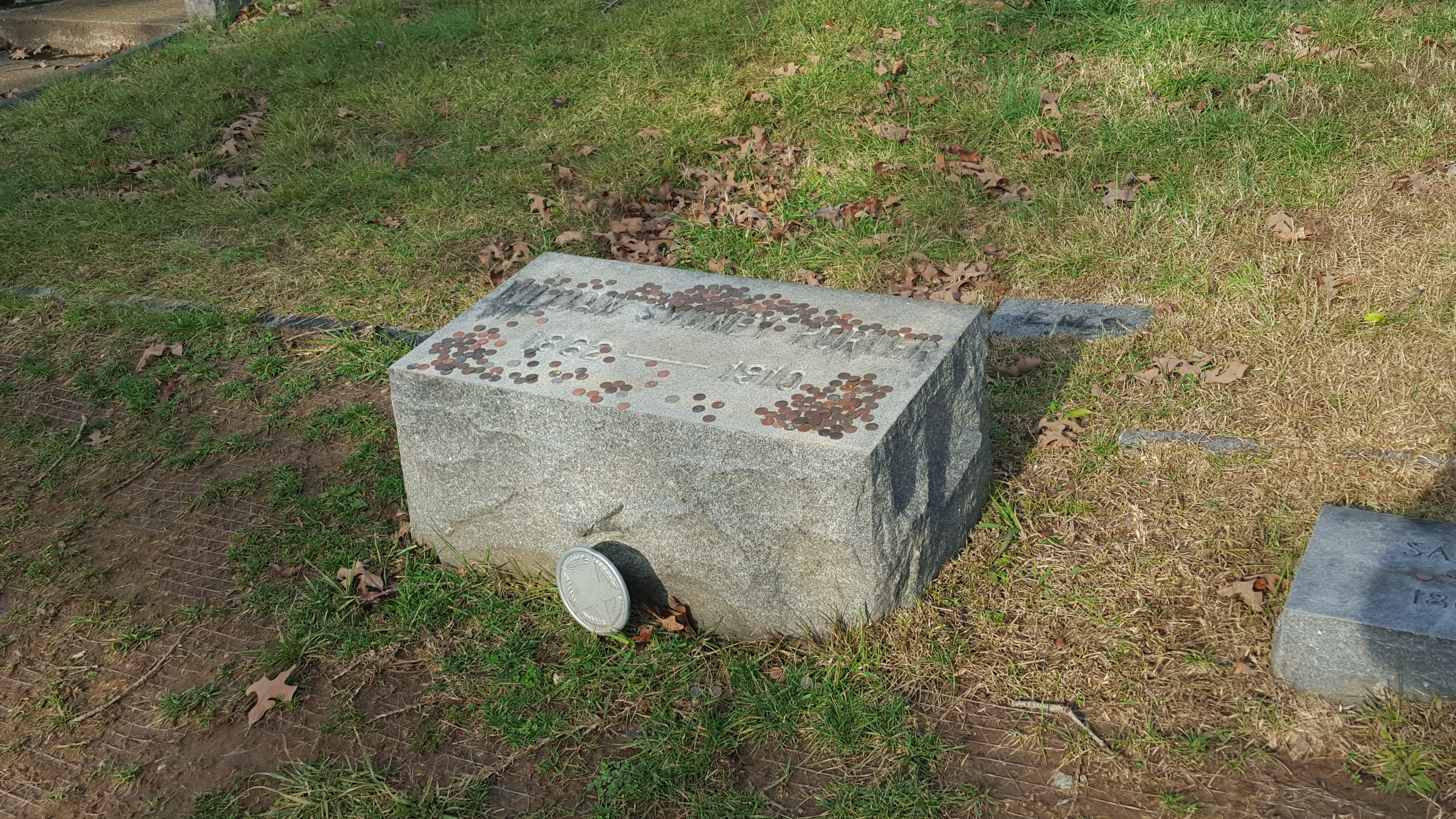
O. Henry Grave, 2015

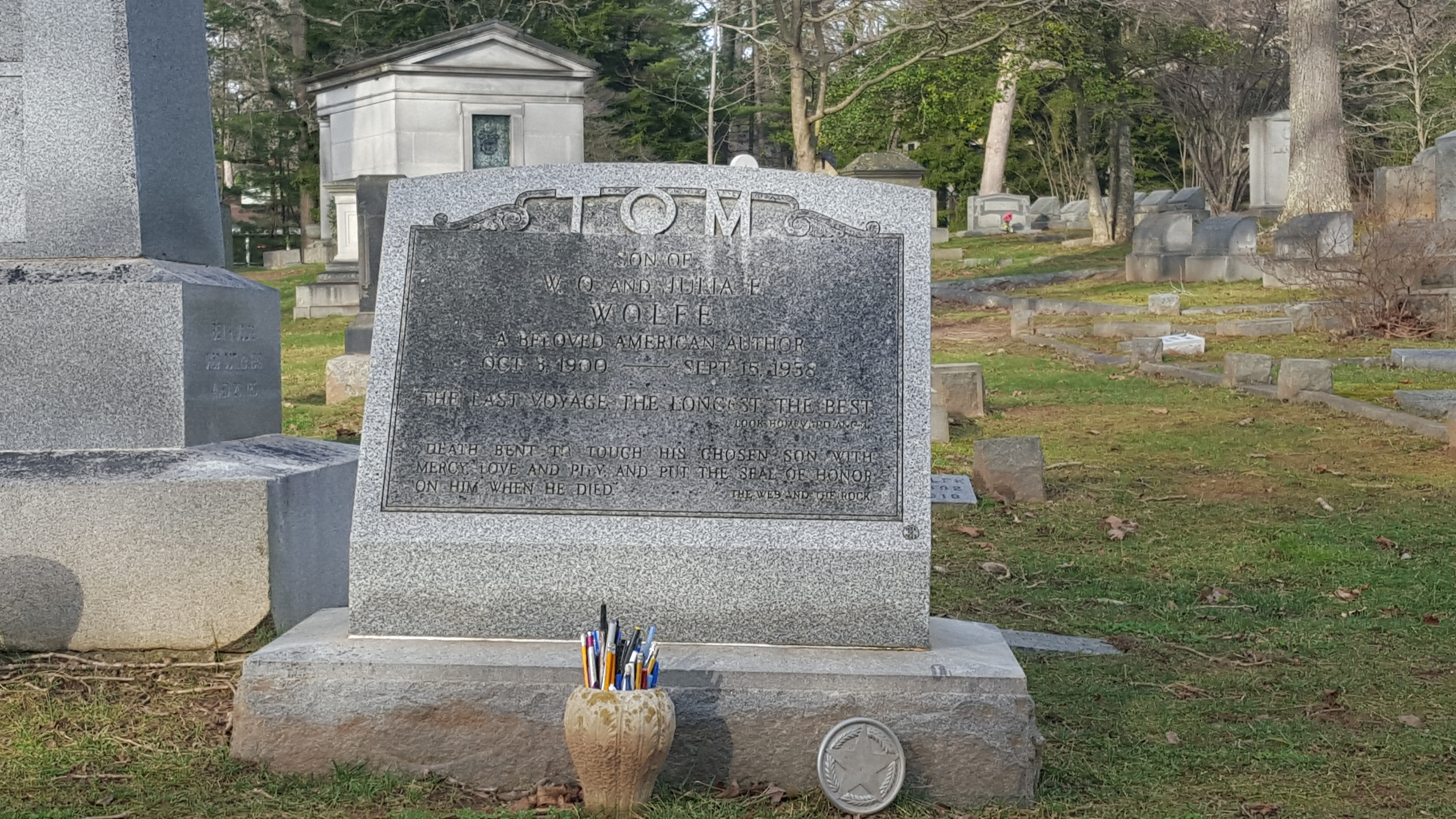
Thomas Wolfe Grave, 2015

== Montford Area Historic District Gallery ==
A few of the many images of the District on Wikimedia :

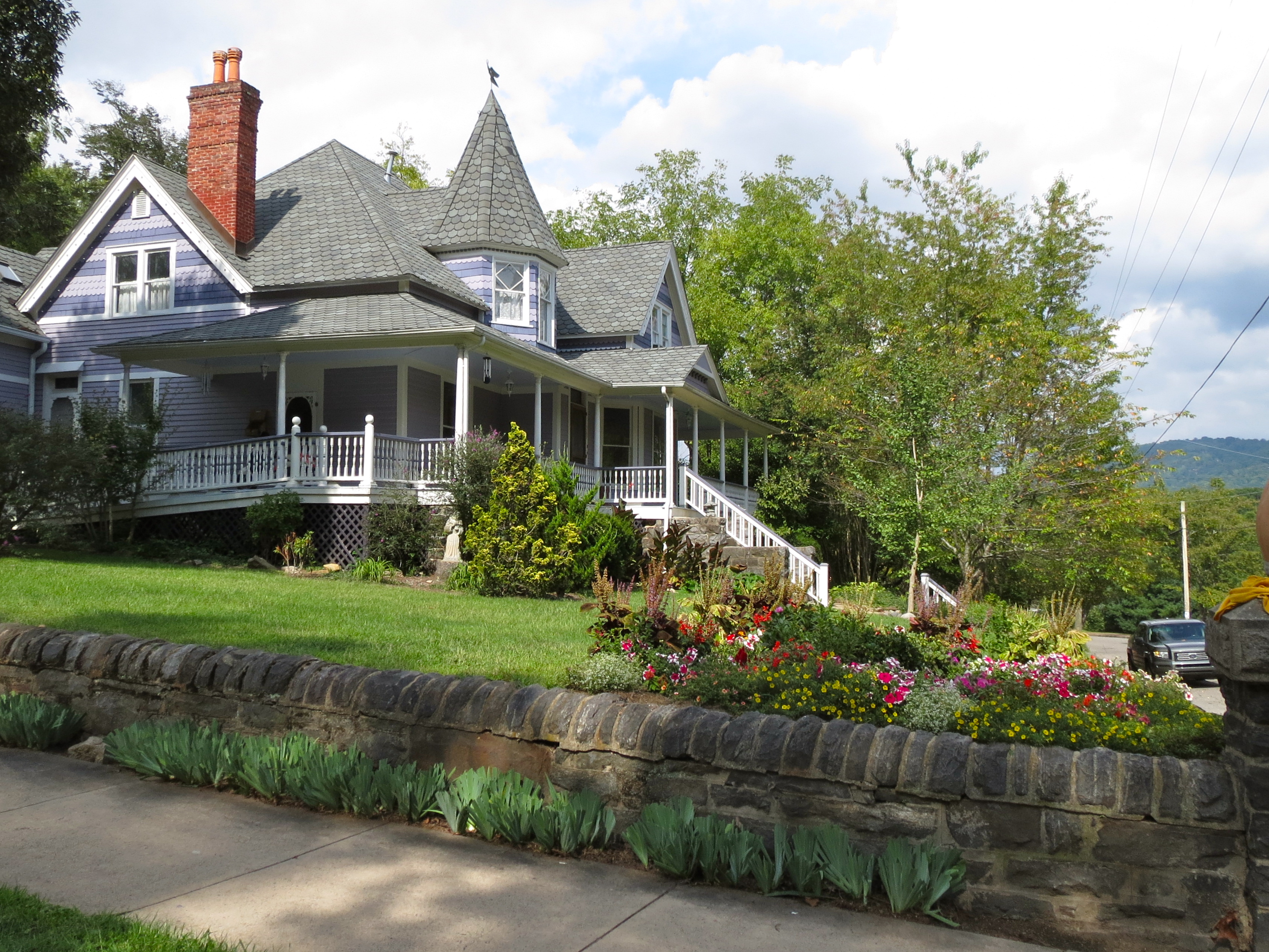
Acupuncture Clinic, 2014

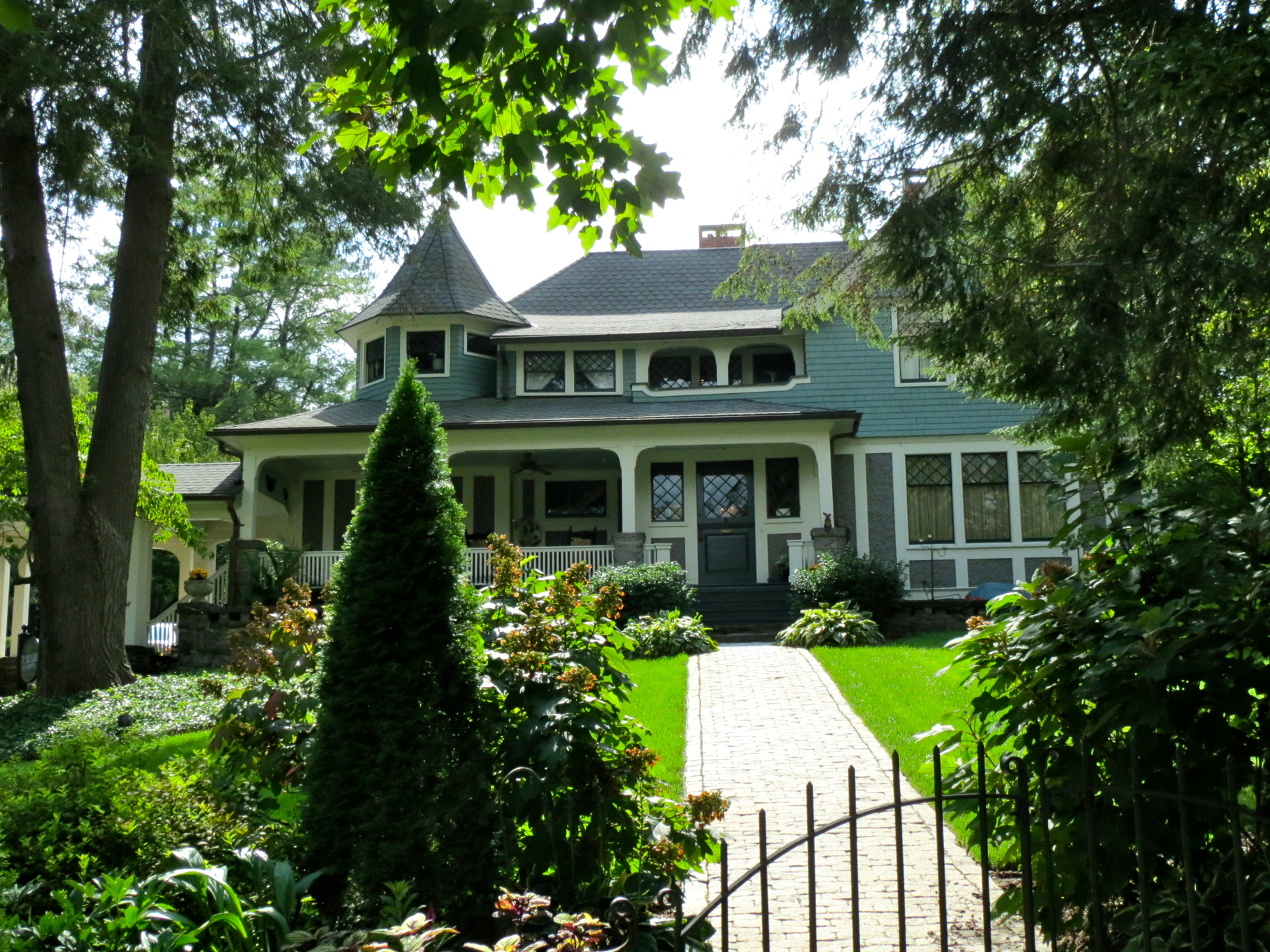
The Black Walnut B&B, 2014

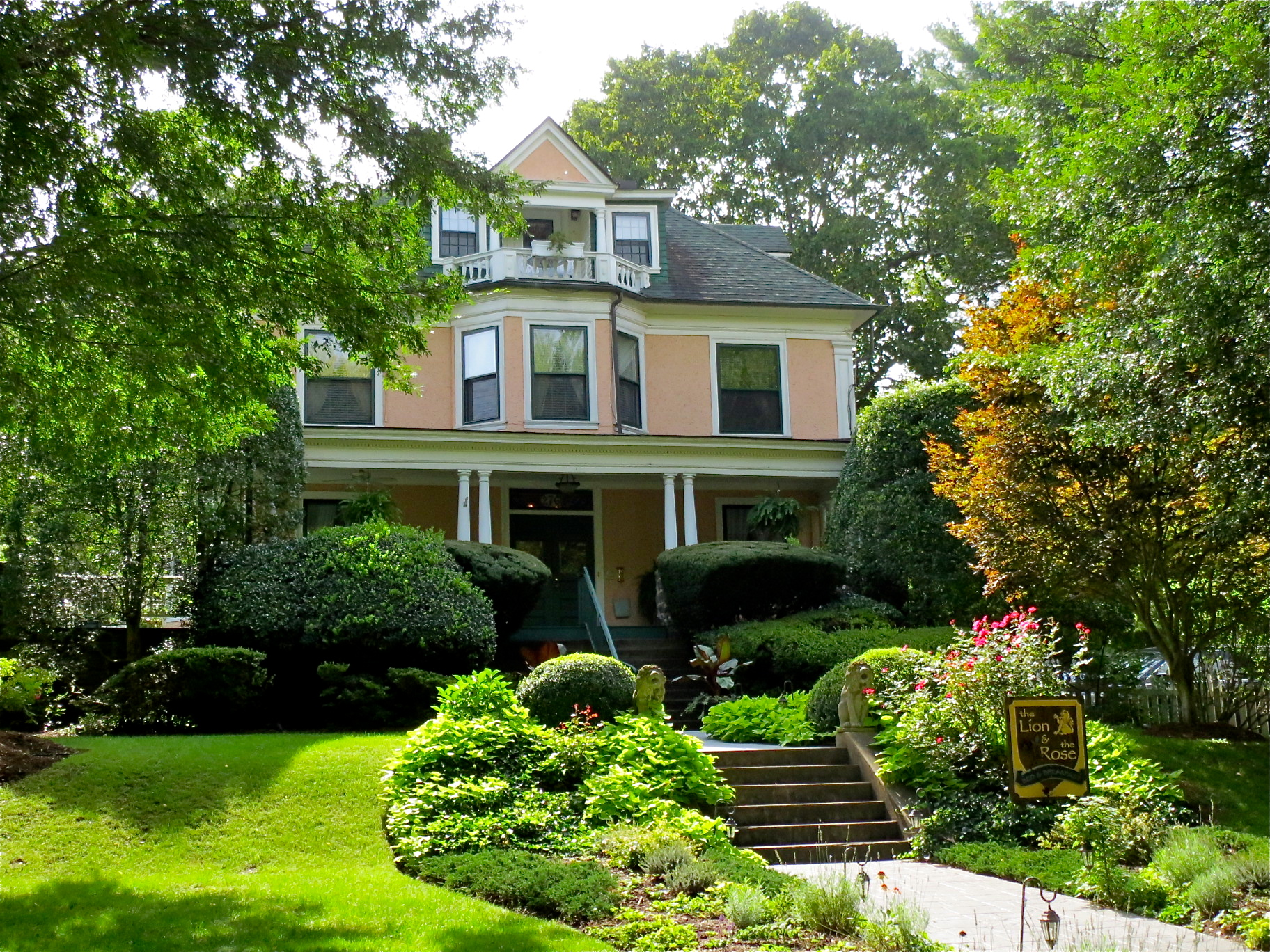
The Lion & The Rose B&B, 2014

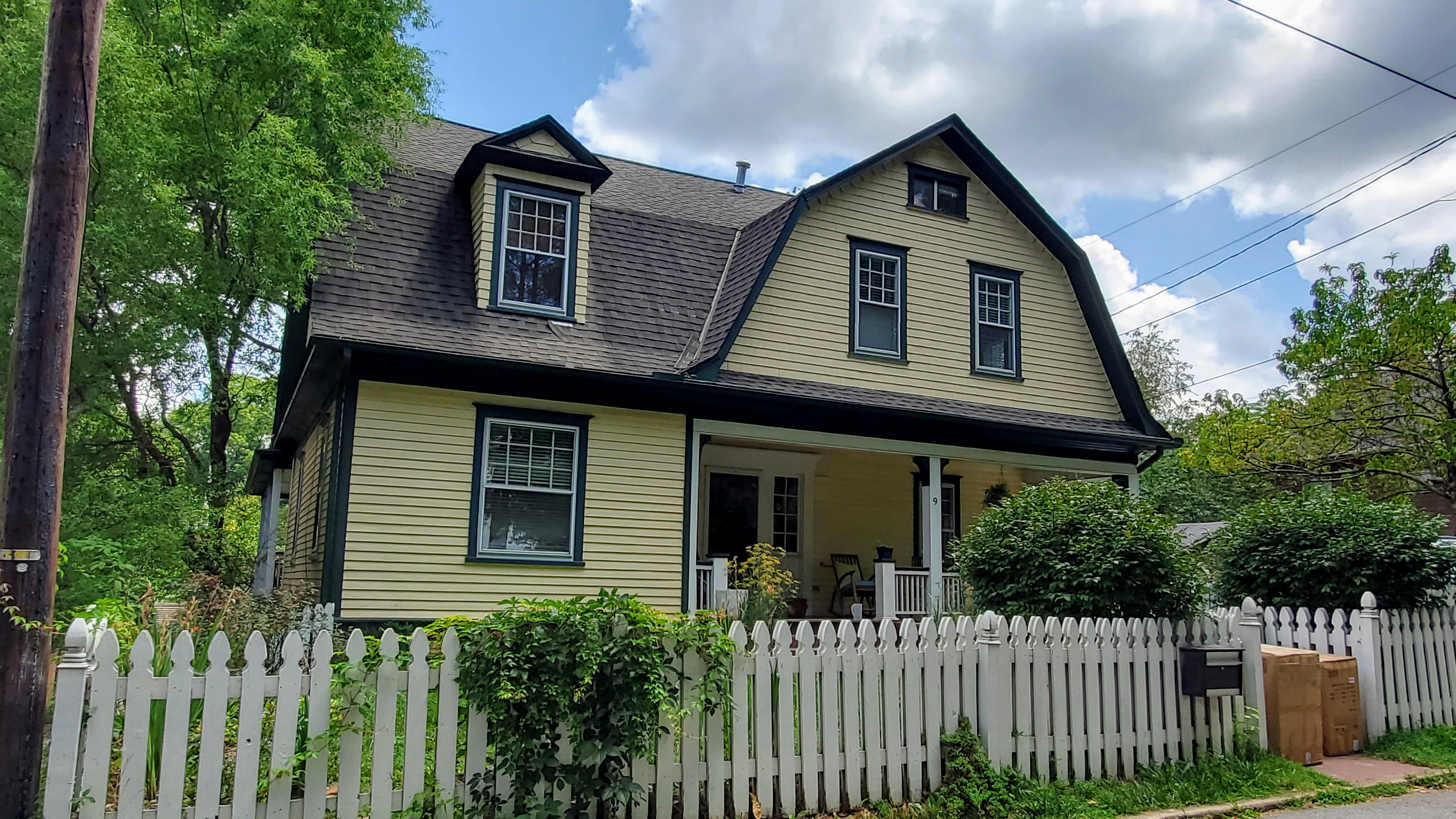
9 Pearson Drive, 2021

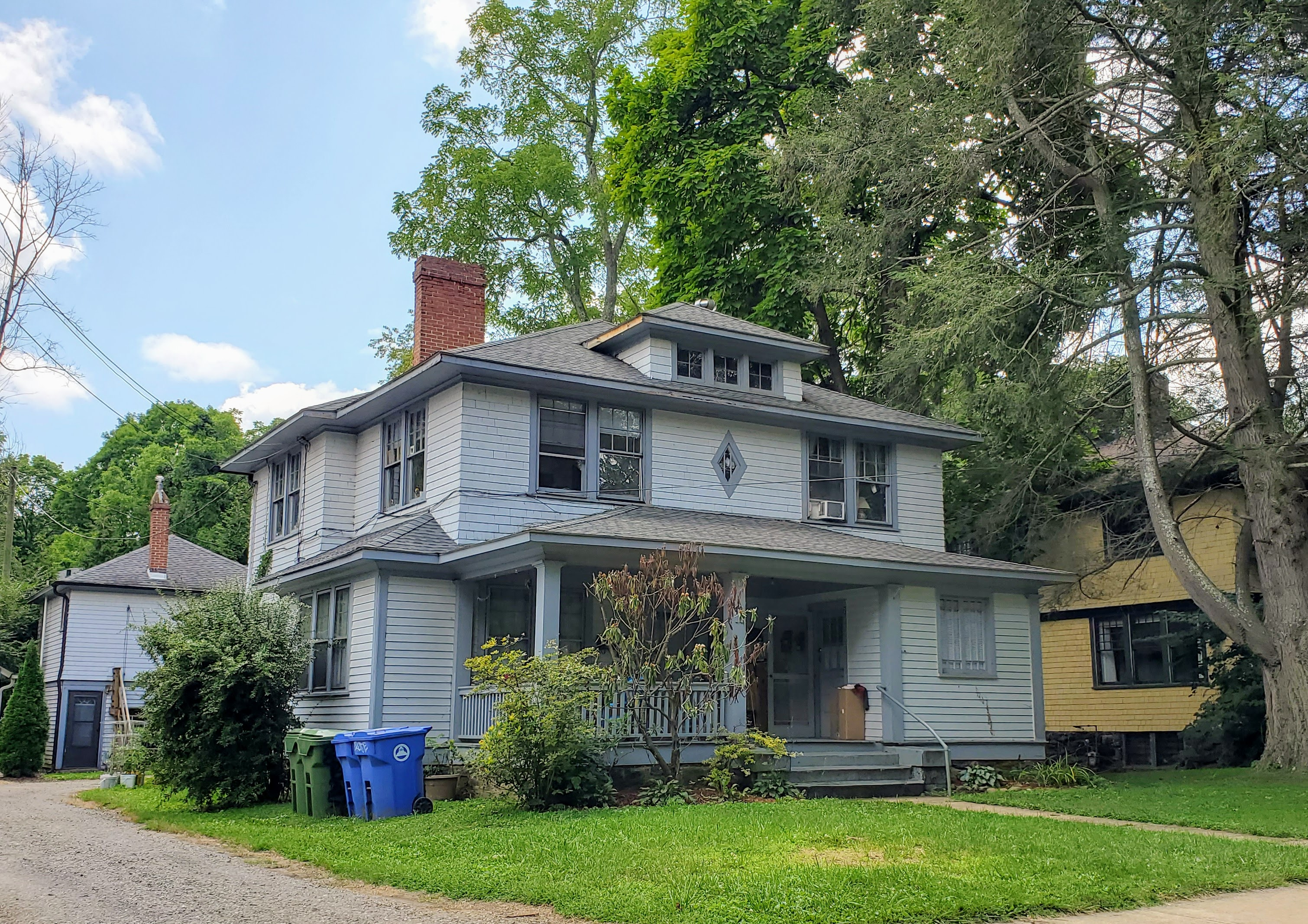
10 Watauga Street, 2021

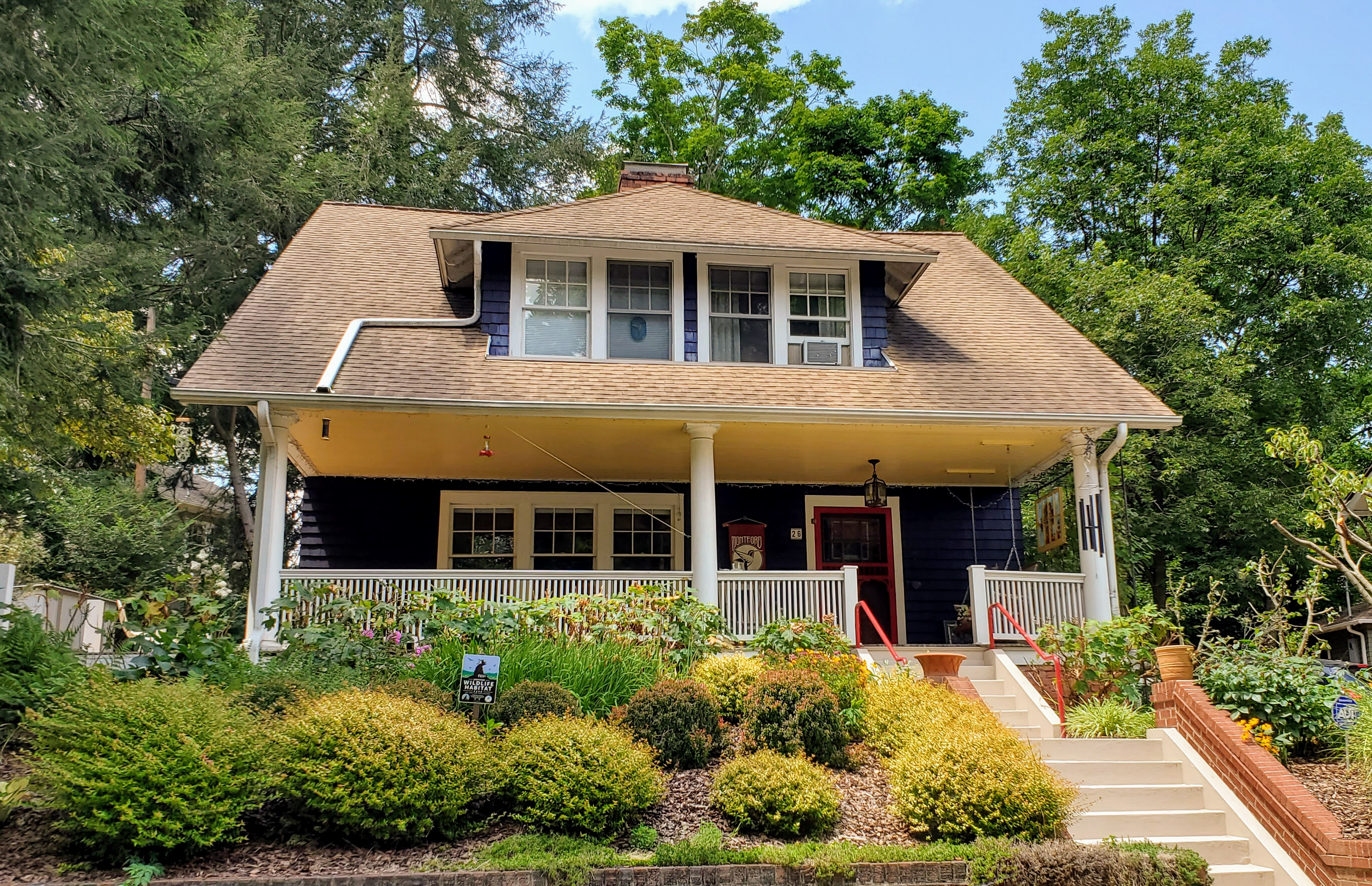
26 Cumberland Circle, 2021

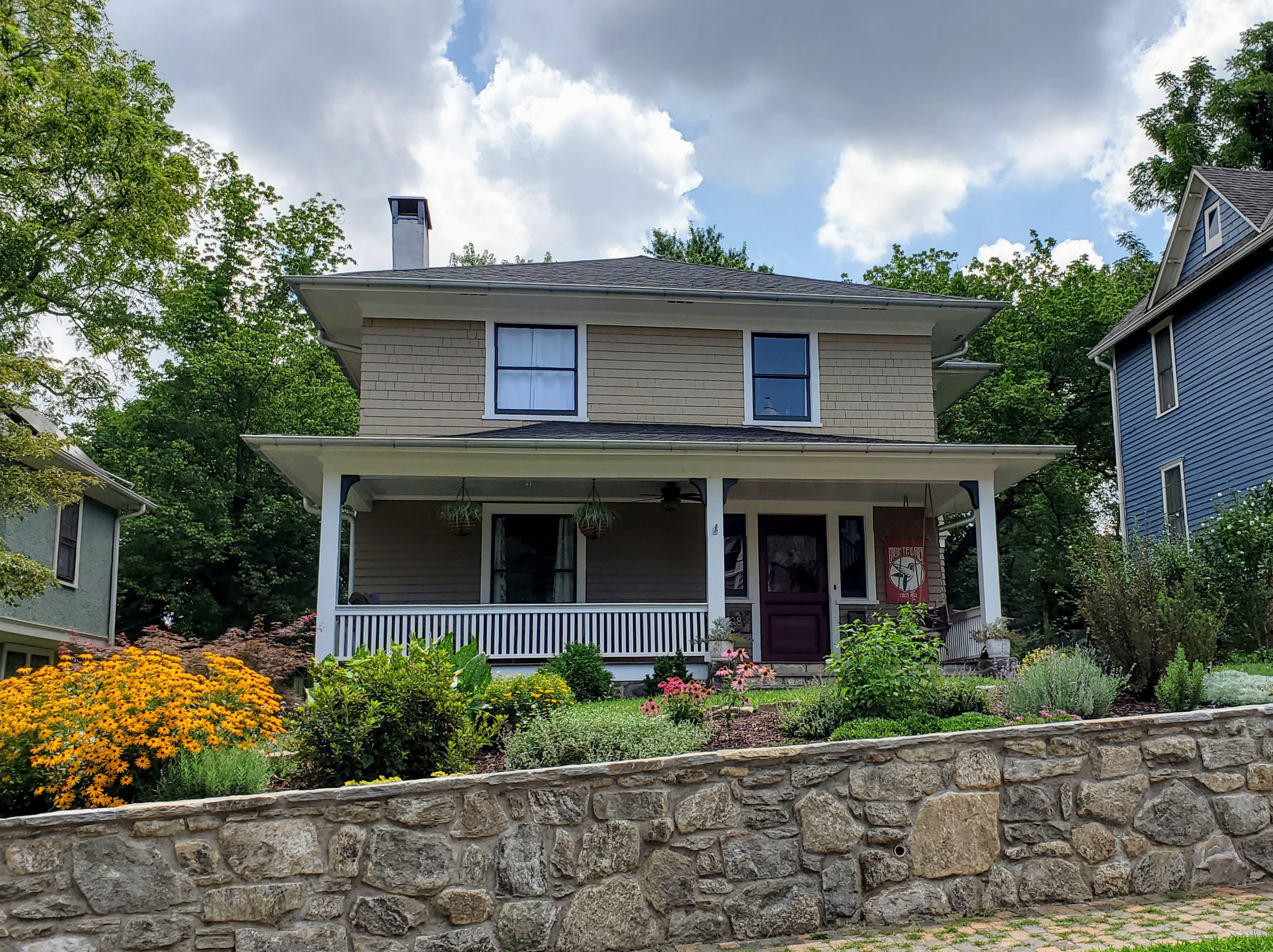
28 Blake Street, 2021

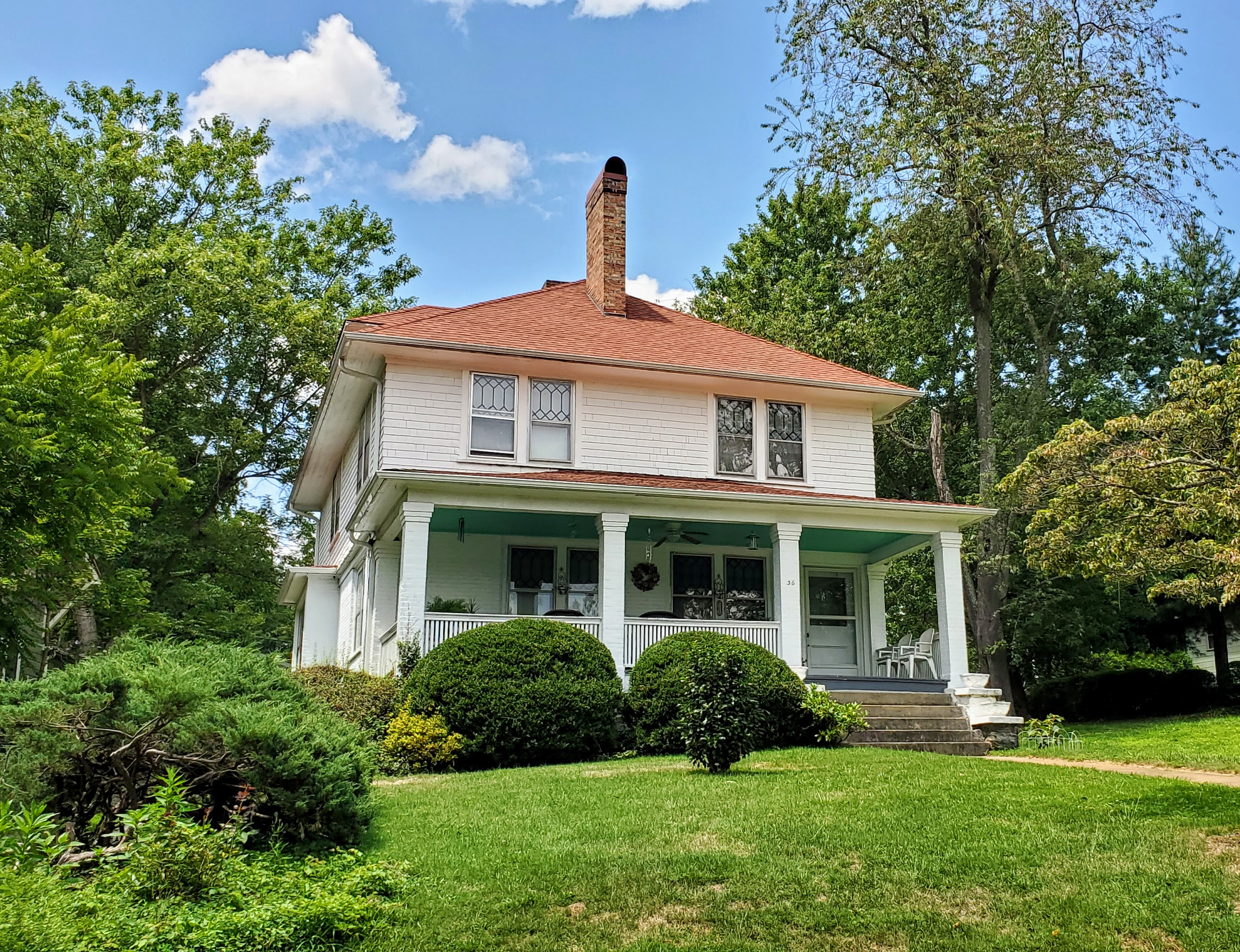
36 Cumberland Circle, 2021

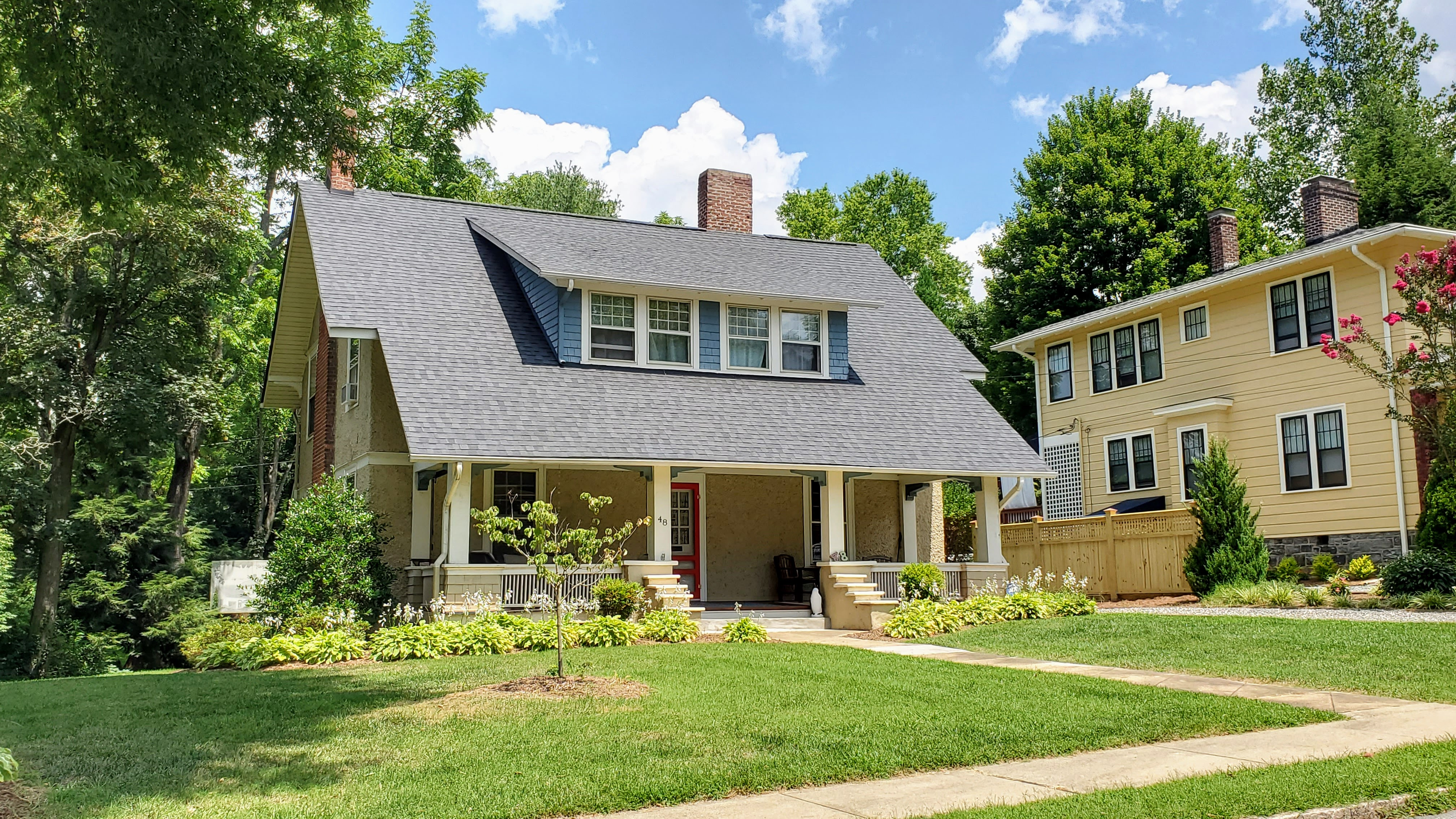
48 Courtland Avenue, 2021

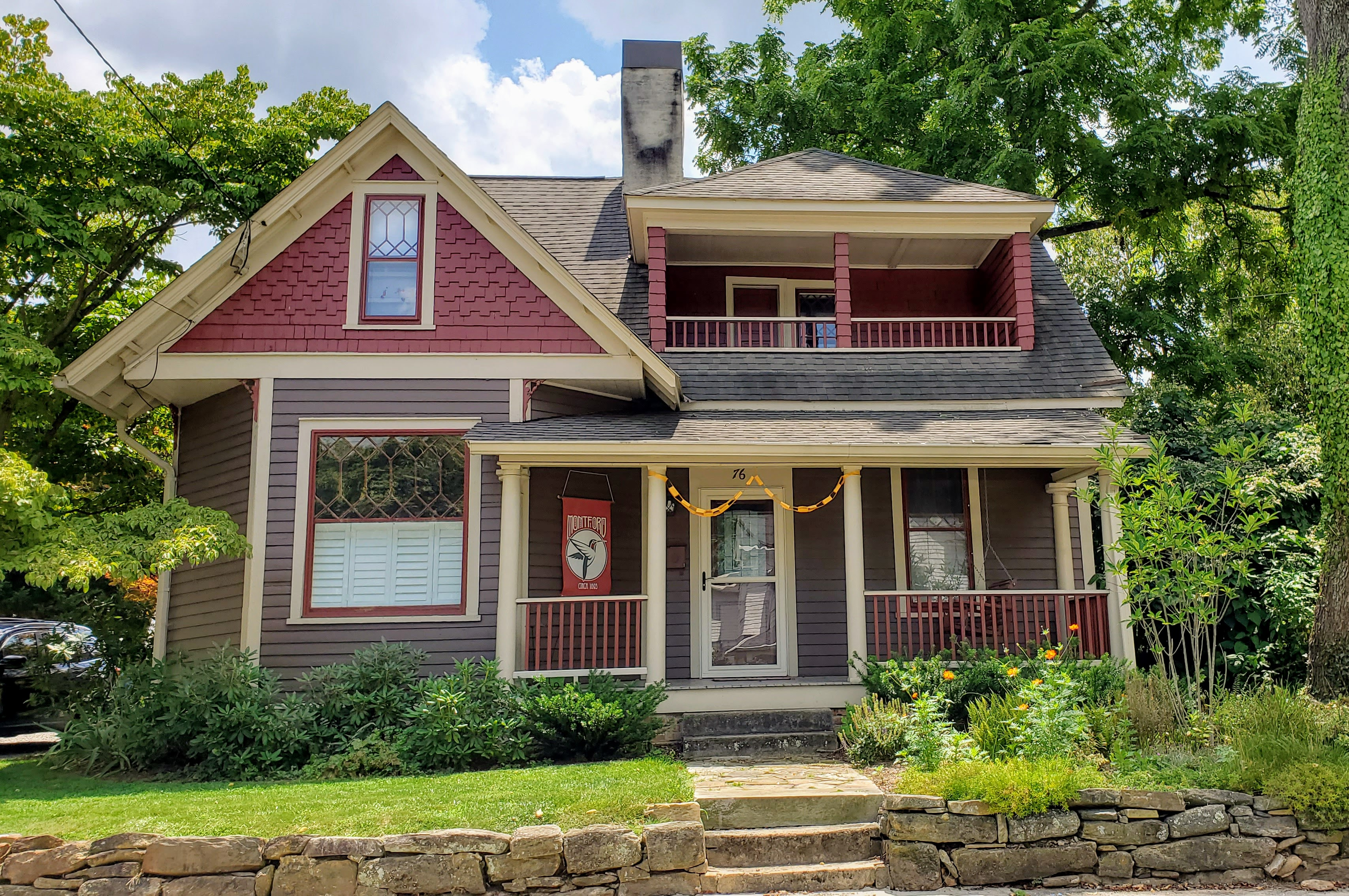
76 Starnes Avenue, 2021

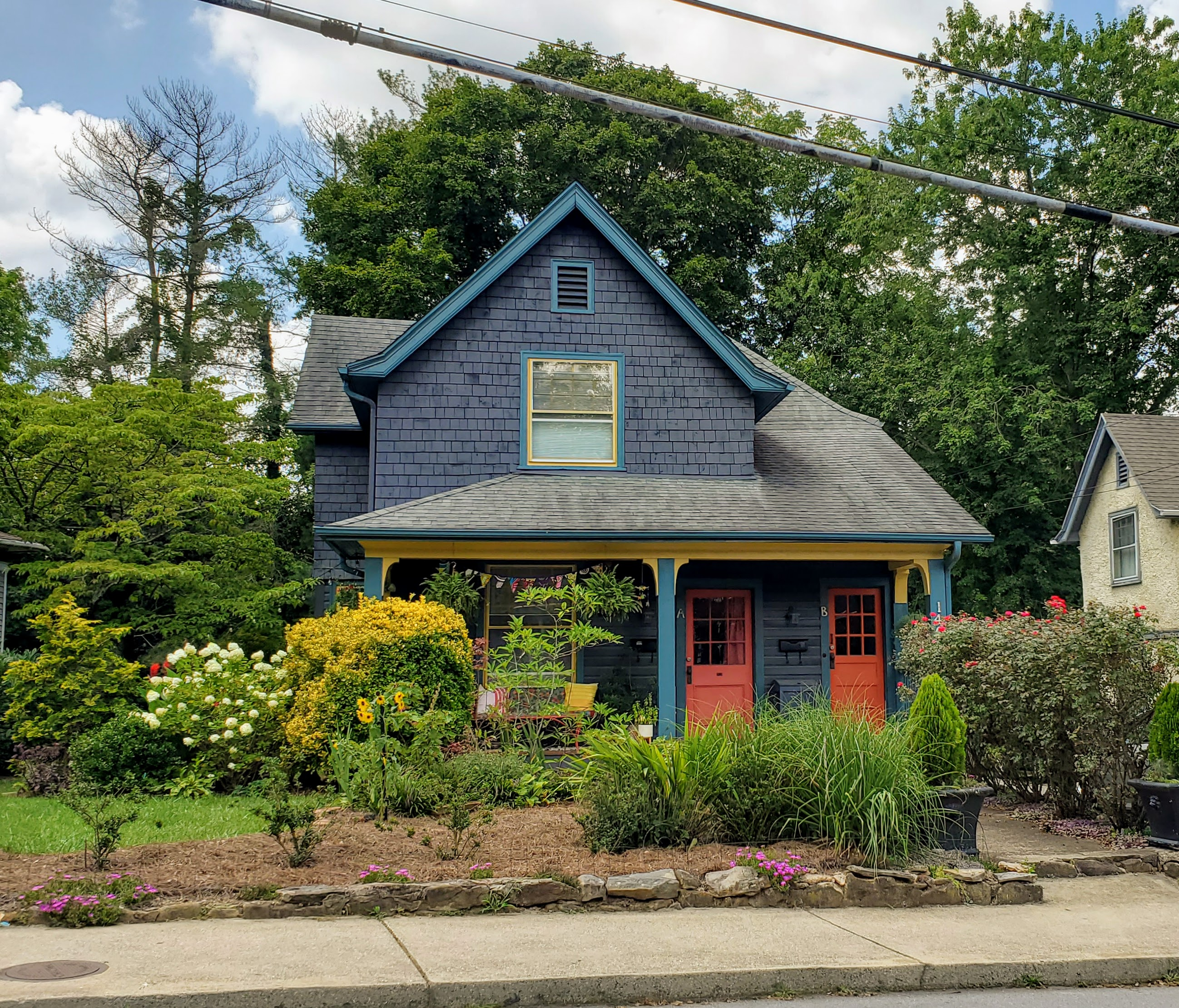
140 Montford Ave., 2021

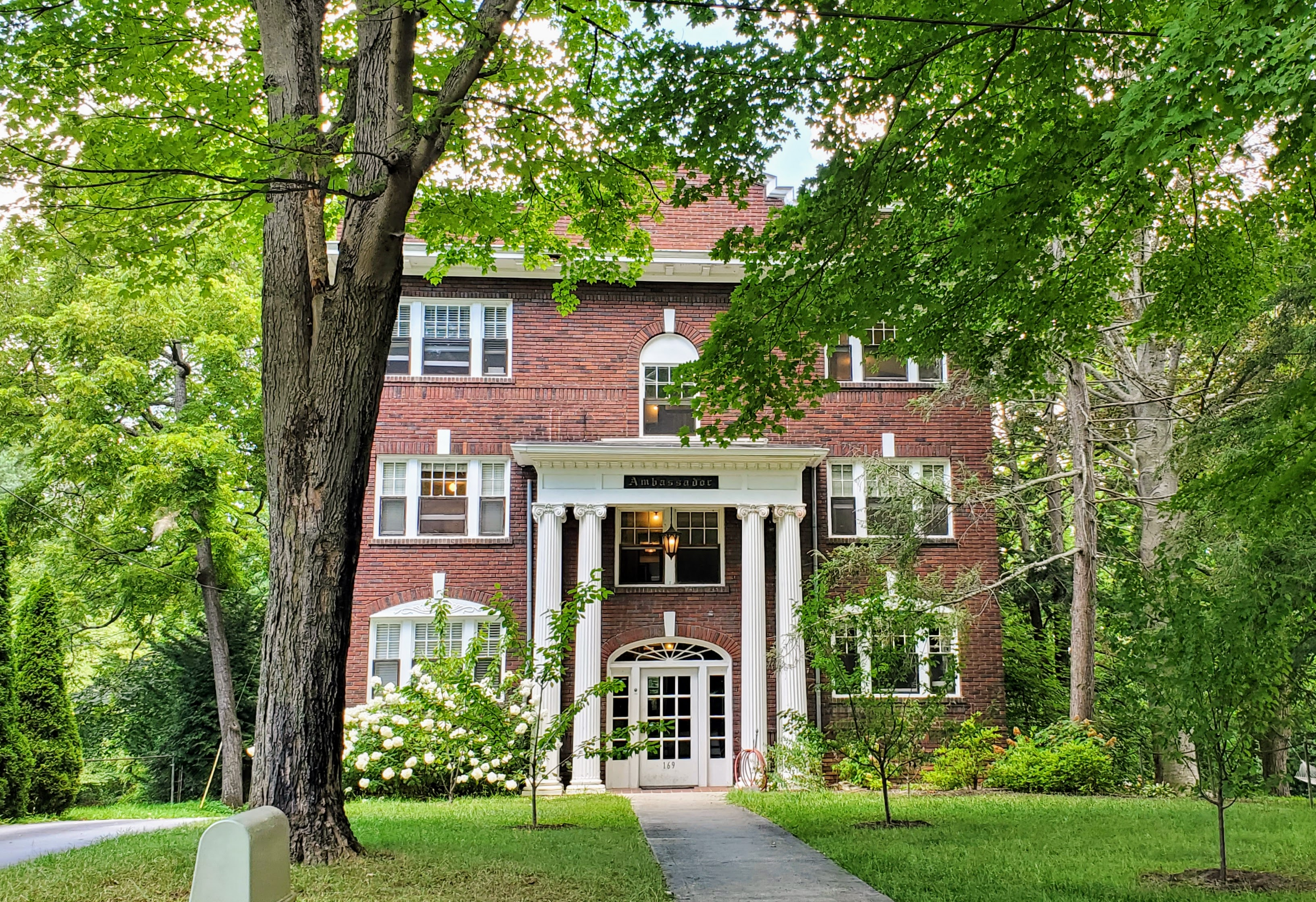
Ambassador Apartments, 2021

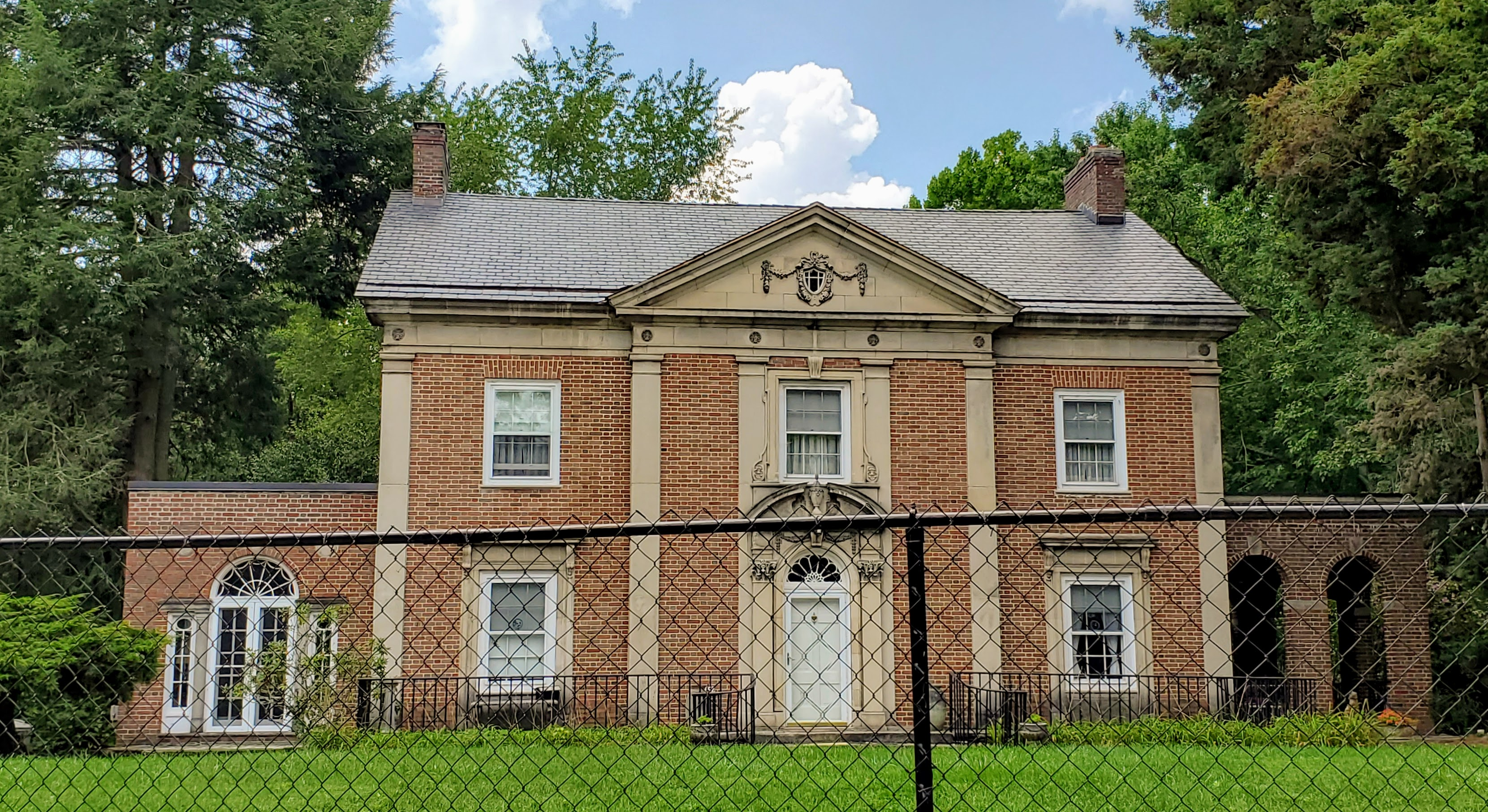
Gay Green House, 2021

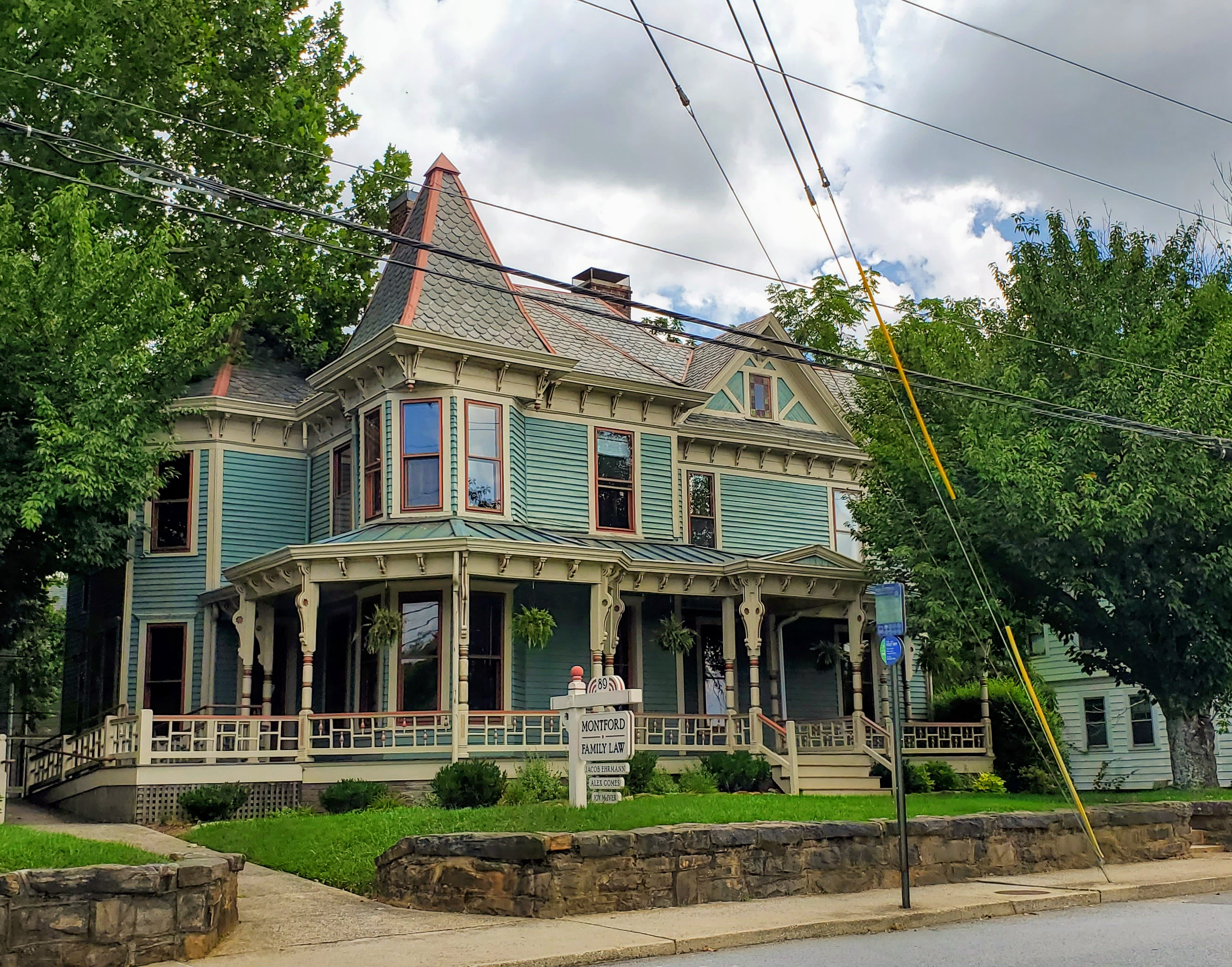
Gudger House, 2021

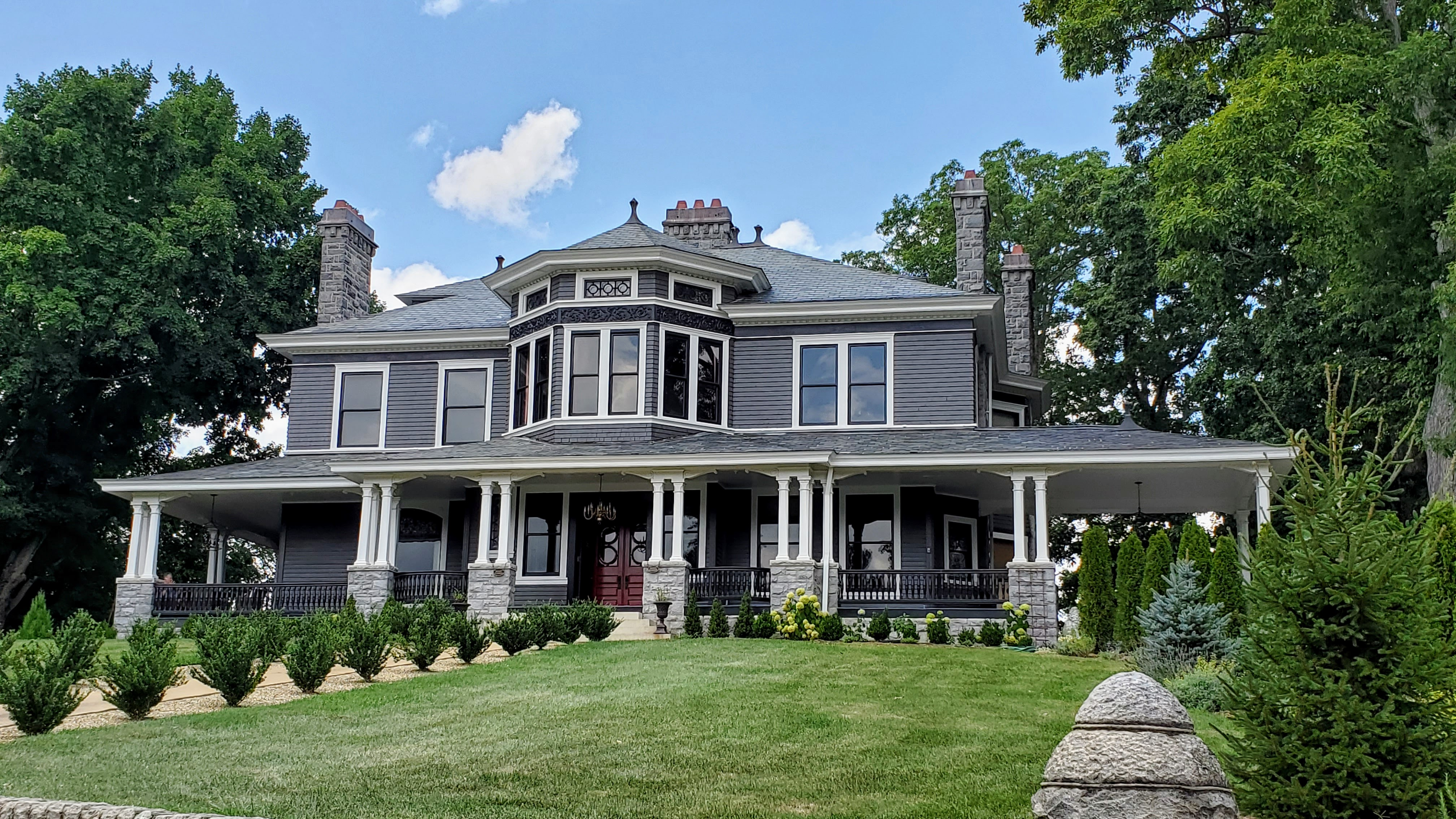
Rumbough House, 2021
