= The Weekly Caucasian =

U.S. newspapers

The Weekly Caucasian was the name of several newspapers published in the United States in the wake of the American Civil War.

Missouri - The Weekly Caucasian was a newspaper published in Lafayette County, Missouri in the United States from 1866 to 1875. According to one historian of Reconstruction "supporting the virtues of the Confederacy, applying the lessons of 'The Lost Cause' to Missouri, and aggressively advocating the program of the Democratic Party" was a profitable formula for the publishers. There were other newspapers with similar names and "in addition to sharing a name, the papers shared overtly white supremacist content"; a research team at the Washington University in St. Louis is trying to determine if this "was a loose network of publications or an organized one and if the papers picked up stories from each other or worked independently."

New York - John H. Van Evrie, who has been described as America's "first professional racist," had a newspaper called the New York Day-Book that he renamed the Weekly Caucasian in 1861.
