= James Green Martin =

Confederate Army general

James G. Martin
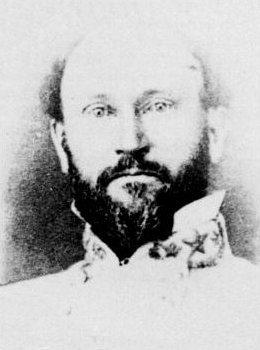
- Born: February 14, 1819; Elizabeth City, North Carolina
- Died: October 4, 1878 (aged 59); Asheville, North Carolina
- Burial place: Riverside Cemetery; Asheville, North Carolina
- Military career
- Allegiance: United States of America; Confederate States of America
- Branch: United States Army; Confederate States Army
- Service years: 1840–1861 (USA); 1861–1865 (CSA)
- Rank: Brevet Major (USA); Brigadier General (CSA)
- Nickname: Old One Wing
- Conflicts: Aroostock War; Mexican War; Utah War; American Civil War: Overland Campaign; Battle of Cold Harbor; Siege of Petersburg
- Other work: Lawyer

James Green Martin (February 14, 1819 – October 4, 1878) was a brigadier general in the Confederate States Army during the American Civil War.

== Early life ==
Martin was born in Elizabeth City, North Carolina, the son of Dr. William D. Martin and Sophia Dauge Martin. He attended the United States Military Academy at West Point and graduated in 1840, fourteenth in the class, directly behind future Confederate general Richard S. Ewell. On July 12, 1844, Martin married Mary Ann Murray Read, great-granddaughter of Declaration of Independence signer George Read and General William Thompson.

== Military career ==
Martin was commissioned as a second lieutenant in the First Regiment of the United States Artillery. He served mainly on the northern coast, on the frontier of Maine, in the Aroostock War, and in the coastal survey. He served in the Mexican War and took part in the battles of Monterey, Vera Cruz, Cerro Gordo, Contreras and Churubusco, where he lost his right arm after it was shattered by grapeshot. After the wounding, Martin left the field with his sleeve clenched between his teeth and relinquished command of the battery to Stonewall Jackson. Due to the loss of his arm, Martin became known by the nickname "Old One Wing." Martin was brevetted as a major for his performance at Churubusco and Contreras.

After the Mexican War, Martin transferred to staff and was appointed assistant quartermaster and was stationed at Fortress Monroe, Philadelphia, Pennsylvania, and Governor's Island. Martin then went to Fort Snelling in Minnesota. While there, his wife Mary Ann died. On February 8, 1858, he married Hetty King, sister of General Rufus King. Martin next took part in the Utah War under Albert Sidney Johnston and at the outbreak of the Civil War, he was on staff duty at Fort Riley, Kansas.

== Civil War ==
Resigning his commission on June 14, 1861, Martin offered his services to North Carolina, and was commissioned as a captain in the cavalry. Martin was later appointed adjutant general of North Carolina. At his suggestion, blockade-running ships were first employed to bring supplies to the Confederacy from Europe.

On September 28, 1861, he was appointed commander-in-chief of the state forces, with the rank of major general of militia. Martin was able to raise 12,000 more men than the state quota.

After Martin had completed this work, he applied for duty in the field, and in May 1862, he was promoted to brigadier general in the provisional army. In August 1862, he was given command of the district of North Carolina, with headquarters at Kinston, North Carolina. In the fall of 1863, he was directed to organize a brigade from the troops at his disposal and take the field. With this brigade, he went into camp near Wilmington, North Carolina.

When Major General George E. Pickett made his demonstration against New Bern in February 1864, Martin successfully attacked and drove the Union troops from Newport. When the Overland Campaign opened, Martin was called to Petersburg. He was the first in the field under Major General William Henry Chase Whiting. Major General Daniel Harvey Hill took command of the division on May 20, and Martin's brigade won distinction for their charge, driving the enemy from the works in their front. Afterwards his men carried him around on their shoulders, shouting, "Three cheers for Old One Wing." The brigade was then assigned to Robert Hoke's division, and reinforced Robert E. Lee at Turkey Hill during the Battle of Cold Harbor, where they repulsed the Union assaults on June 3, and afterward were engaged in a sharpshooting fight along the line. Lee, believing Ulysses S. Grant would make another attack, informed Martin that he held the key to the Confederate position, and asked if his troops, comparatively new, could be relied upon. Martin promptly responded that his men were as good as veterans, but that he thought he should be transferred to the south of the James River, as he believed Grant would attack Richmond from the rear. Lee then sent Martin's brigade to Petersburg. During the siege, Martin's health gave way under the strain and exposure, and he was transferred to the command of the district of Western North Carolina, with headquarters at Asheville. After he had left the Army of Northern Virginia, Lee stated that "General Martin is one to whom North Carolina owes a debt she can never repay." Martin surrendered the Army of Western North Carolina in Waynesville, North Carolina on May 6, 1865. This was the last organized Confederate force remaining in the state.

== Post-war life ==
After the war ended, Martin was financially ruined. He studied law and practiced it in Asheville for the remainder of his life. Martin died on October 4, 1878, and is buried in Asheville's Riverside Cemetery.

== See also ==
- List of American Civil War generals (Confederate)
