= Fusionism in North Carolina =

Electoral fusion of the Republican and Populist Parties, 1894 to 1900

From 1894 to 1900, the North Carolina Republican Party and the Populist Party collaborated via electoral fusion to compete against the North Carolina Democratic Party. This political coalition was dubbed Fusionism.

== Background ==
After years of growing debt and diminished returns on crops, farmers in North Carolina founded their own chapter of the Farmers' Alliance in 1887. The body lobbied for increased regulation of railroads, uniform interest rates, and additional reforms aimed at ameliorating the agricultural economy. Some leading North Carolina Republicans, such as Daniel L. Russell and John James Mott, endorsed Alliance proposals to create a commission to oversee the railroads, but such efforts had been rejected by Democratic leaders. In an 1889 article in the Raleigh Signal, an anonymous correspondent suggested that Republican and Alliance members join to break the Democrats' dominance of state institutions.

However, at first, the Farmers' Alliance, under the leadership of National Farmers' Alliance presidents Leonidas L. Polk and Marion Butler, concentrated on working within the dominant Democratic Party and ensuring the nomination and election of "Alliance Democrats"; by one estimate, over 110 of 170 representatives of the 1891 North Carolina House were members.

By 1892, Polk and other Alliance members had established their own chapter of the Populist Party. At first Marion Butler and many other Alliance leaders refused to join the Populists, advocating continued cooperation with the North Carolina Democratic Party. After former Alliance president Elias Carr won the nomination of the party for governor over incumbent Bourbon Democrat Thomas Michael Holt, Butler proposed electoral fusion between the state Populists and Democrats, while Polk demurred. However, the nomination of Bourbon Democrat Grover Cleveland for US president in June 1892, combined with a North Carolina Democratic Party edict that no party member could "split the ticket" and vote Democratic in state and local elections but for Populist James B. Weaver for president, caused Butler and many other Alliance Democrats to bolt the party and join the Populists.

In response, many Republicans urged cooperation with Populists during the 1892 statewide elections in North Carolina. Party leaders eventually rejected this as a strategy, but a handful of Republicans and Populists agreed jointly to support municipal candidates. While Governor Carr and the North Carolina Democrats won the election, the combined vote total of the Populists and Republicans exceeded that of the Democrats, suggesting that Populist-Republican fusion might have a chance of success. In 1893 the Democrat-dominated General Assembly placed restrictions on the Farmers' Alliance's charter, infuriating its members and increasing their willingness to cooperate with Republicans.

== 1894 election and rise to prominence ==
In 1894 Republican and Populist leaders in North Carolina agreed to support one another. Methods differed, but sometimes the two parties chose candidates jointly and other times they agreed to both support a candidate nominated by one of the parties. Their Democratic opponents dubbed this process "Fusionism".

== 1896 election ==
In the prelude to the 1896 state elections, North Carolina's Republicans were deeply divided over ideology and how to approach Fusionism. One faction, the radical Fusionists led by Russell, favored cooperation and combined electoral tickets with the Populists at all levels of government—including the presidential election—and backed free silver. The opposing faction, the "Old Guard", repudiated free silver and wanted to front a straight Republican electoral ticket. The Old Guard was led by three Piedmont Republicans: Oliver H. Dockery, Alfred Eugene Holton, and Thomas Settle. Black Republicans were also divided. A conservative faction, led by Henry P. Cheatham and John C. Dancy, favored a straight Republican ticket and opposed Russell for insulting blacks in previous years by supporting lily-white ideas. They also distrusted the Populists, fearing that relying on them would disenchant upper middle class and wealthy whites who had hitherto been the chief protectors of blacks' civil rights. They furthermore figured that Democrats would divide a prospective Fusionist coalition by employing race-baiting tactics, thus dooming their electoral chances. The black Fusionists, led by James H. Young and George Henry White, disfavored the passive role the conservatives thought politics held for blacks and were pleased with the electoral reforms passed by the Fusionist coalition in the state legislature, fearing disenfranchisement if the Democrats retook of the body. Russell and Dockery emerged as the early major contenders for the Republican gubernatorial nomination.

While the Republicans wrangled over their internal differences, Populist leaders waited to make any commitments. Butler and many of his colleagues, feeling assured by Populist successes in 1894, thought their party was growing nationally and could eventually supersede the Democratic Party. As such, Butler wanted focus the Populists' messaging around free silver and other monetary reforms to attract new support. He feared the Republicans wanted a compromise largely on their own terms which might allow for gold standard supporters to be on a combined ticket and thus ruin the Populists' biggest political issue. Advocating that the Populists nominate their own presidential candidate, he refused to consider Fusionism until "full and frank" discussions were held between Republican and Populist leaders.

On April 16 and April 17, 1896, members of the Republican and Populist state executive committees met in Raleigh to negotiate a political agreement. The parties deadlocked over several key issues. Both wanted to nominate their own gubernatorial candidates. The Populists demanded that the Republicans nominate only free silver candidates, accommodate an independent presidential ticket, and refused to guarantee that they would support the reelection of Republican U.S. Senator Jeter Connelly Pritchard the following year. With the Republican Fusionists disheartened, the conference disbanded without any agreement. Russel continued to urge local Republican chapters to send Fusionist delegates to the upcoming state party convention, while the Populists evaluated their chances of gaining direct black electoral support.

The North Carolina Republican convention opened in Raleigh on May 14. Since ten counties sent two separate delegations each, a credentials dispute ensued on who to admit into the convention. Russell's allies secured agreements from some delegates backing minor gubernatorial candidates and was able to secure a majority vote among the convention in favor of admitting mostly pro-Russel delegations from the contested counties. The gubernatorial nomination process was contentious but Russell prevailed over Dockery on the seventh ballot.

== Demise ==
In 1900 the Democratic Party soundly defeated the Republicans and Populists in the statewide elections, leading to the dissolution of the Populist Party in the state and greatly weakening the Republican Party.

== Legacy ==
The Fusionist coalition's victories in North Carolina in the 1890s, along with the brief ascendance of the Readjuster Party in Virginia in the late 1870s and early 1880s, marked the only instances in which Republican-supported groups successfully broke the dominance of the Democratic Party in the Solid South in the post-Reconstruction era.

== See also ==
- Wilmington massacre
- Fusionism

== Works cited ==
- Beckel, Deborah (2011). Radical Reform: Interracial Politics in Post-Emancipation North Carolina. Charlottesville: University of Virginia Press. ISBN 978-0-8139-3002-2.
- Crow, Jeffrey J.; Durden, Robert F. (1977). Maverick Republican in the Old North State : A Political Biography of Daniel L. Russell. Baton Rouge: Louisiana State University Press. ISBN 9780807102916.
