= Bailey House =

Bailey House may refer to:

== Places in the United States ==
- Bailey House (Warren, Arkansas)
- Bailey-Bunn House, in Raleigh, North Carolina
- Bailey-Tucker House, in Raleigh, North Carolina
- Routh-Bailey House, in Fayetteville, Arkansas
- Bailey House (Los Angeles), California
- Stuart Bailey House, designed by Richard Neutra
- Jonathan Bailey House (Whittier, California)
- Bailey House (Denver, Colorado)
- Bailey House (Fernandina Beach, Florida)
- Maj. James B. Bailey House, in Gainesville, Florida
- Goodwyn-Bailey House, Newnan, Georgia
- Frederick A. Bailey House, in Talbotton, Georgia
- Bailey House Museum, or Hale Hōʻikeʻike at the Bailey House, in Wailuku, Hawaii
- William S. Bailey House, in Macomb, Illinois
- George A. and Mary Tinkel Bailey House, in Correctionville, Iowa
- William H. and Alice Bailey House, in Des Moines, Iowa
- Chiles-Bailey House, in Shelby County, Kentucky
- Moses Bailey House, in Winthrop Center, Maine
- Timothy P. Bailey House, in Andover, Massachusetts
- Bailey House (Ipswich, Massachusetts)
- Liberty Hyde Bailey Birthplace, in South Haven, Michigan
- W. Bailey House, in Eveleth, Minnesota
- J. V. Bailey House, at the Minnesota State Fair, in Falcon Heights, Minnesota
- W. T. Bailey House, in Virginia, Minnesota
- Philo C. Bailey House, in Waseca, Minnesota
- Bailey House (Biloxi, Mississippi), in Harrison County, Mississippi
- Dr. Isham G. Bailey House, in Lamar, Mississippi
- Dodge-Bailey House, in Santa Fe, New Mexico
- Jonathan Bailey House (Milo, New York)
- James Bailey House, New York, New York
- William Bailey House, in Plattsburgh, New York
- Lawrence D. Bailey House, in Clackamas County, Oregon
- John Bailey Farm, in East Fallowfield Township, Pennsylvania
- Gardner-Bailey House, in Edgewood, Pennsylvania
- William L. Bailey House, or Dominic Hall, in Providence, Rhode Island
- Dr. York Bailey House, on Saint Helena Island, South Carolina
- Harry Bailey House, in Lebanon, Tennessee

== Other places ==
- Bailey House (Annapolis Royal), in Annapolis Royal, Nova Scotia, Canada

== Other uses ==
- Bailey House (charity), an American charity based in New York for people living with HIV and AIDS

== See also ==
- Old Bailey (disambiguation)
