= National Register of Historic Places listings in Coweta County, Georgia =

Map of Georgia with Coweta County highlighted

This is a list of properties and districts in Coweta County, Georgia that are listed on the National Register of Historic Places (NRHP).

This National Park Service list is complete through NPS recent listings posted January 16, 2026.

== Current listings ==
	Name on the Register	Image	Date listed	Location	City or town	Description
1	W. A. Brannon Store-Moreland Knitting Mills	W. A. Brannon Store-Moreland Knitting Mills	December 12, 1985 (#85003332)	Main St. 33°17′07″N 84°46′11″W	Moreland	
2	Brown's Mill Battlefield		February 29, 2024 (#100010004)	Address Restricted	Newnan vicinity	
3	Chalk Level Historic District		January 29, 2026 (#100012651)	Roughly bounded by Jones Street to the north; Mitchell and Walthall streets, the southern border of Eastview Cemetery and Robinson Street, The district includes the discontiguous Fanner Street Cemetery on the west side of Farmer Street@.25 mile north o 33°22′13″N 84°47′28″W	Newnan	
4	Cole Town District	Cole Town District	September 30, 1982 (#82002400)	Roughly bounded by Washington, Thompson, and Davis Sts., and Hooligan Alley; 33°22′22″N 84°47′39″W	Newnan	
5	Coweta County Courthouse	Coweta County Courthouse	September 18, 1980 (#80001006)	Courthouse Sq. 33°22′29″N 84°48′01″W	Newnan	
6	William Leonard Crowder Home Place	William Leonard Crowder Home Place	March 17, 1986 (#86000455)	1615 Handy Rd. 33°22′38″N 84°58′07″W	Newnan	
7	Goodwyn-Bailey House	Goodwyn-Bailey House	October 29, 1992 (#92001520)	2295 Old Poplar Rd. 33°21′16″N 84°42′19″W	Newnan	
8	Gordon-Banks House	Gordon-Banks House	January 20, 1972 (#72000383)	South of Newnan on U.S. 29; 33°20′28″N 84°47′01″W	Newnan	
9	Grantville Historic District	Grantville Historic District	June 14, 1991 (#91000772)	Bounded by US 29, LaGrange St., W. Grantville Rd. and the city cemetery 33°14′07″N 84°50′05″W	Grantville	
10	Greenville Street-LaGrange Street Historic District	Greenville Street-LaGrange Street Historic District	April 28, 1983 (#83000190)	LaGrange, Nimmons, Greenville, Powell, Reese, Powell and Buchanan Sts. 33°21′57″N 84°48′02″W	Newnan	
11	Henderson-Orr House	Henderson-Orr House	June 2, 2000 (#00000562)	Junction of Thomas Powers Rd. and GA 34; 33°20′15″N 84°58′51″W	Stallings Crossing	
12	Hollberg Hotel	Hollberg Hotel	March 10, 1980 (#80001007)	Seavy and Barnes Sts. 33°18′04″N 84°33′11″W	Senoia	
13	Newnan Commercial Historic District	Newnan Commercial Historic District	March 20, 1990 (#90000432)	Roughly bounded by Lee, Perry, Salbide, Lagrange, W. Spring, Brown, Madison, and Jefferson; 33°22′28″N 84°48′00″W	Newnan	Coweta County Courthouse is a contributing property
14	Newnan Cotton Mill and Mill Village Historic District	Newnan Cotton Mill and Mill Village Historic District	April 11, 2002 (#02000339)	Roughly bounded by E. Washington, Wilcoxen and Farmer Sts., and CSX RR. 33°22′39″N 84°47′38″W	Newnan	
15	Northwest Newnan Residential Historic District	Northwest Newnan Residential Historic District	May 28, 1982 (#82002401)	Roughly bounded by railroad tracks, Jefferson, Cavender, Duncan, and Browns Sts. 33°22′40″N 84°48′12″W	Newnan	
16	Oak Grove Plantation	Oak Grove Plantation	May 25, 2001 (#01000535)	4537 N US 29; 33°27′32″N 84°41′26″W	Newnan	
17	Oak Hill Cemetery	Oak Hill Cemetery	January 27, 2012 (#11001054)	96 Jefferson St. 33°23′09″N 84°47′52″W	Newnan	
18	Platinum Point Historic District	Platinum Point Historic District	July 12, 1990 (#90000997)	Along Jackson St., 0.5 miles (0.80 km) north of downtown Newnan; 33°23′25″N 84°48′08″W	Newnan	
19	Powell Chapel School	Powell Chapel School	June 23, 2003 (#03000535)	620 Old Atlanta Hwy. 33°24′56″N 84°47′06″W	Newnan	
20	Mary Ray Memorial School	Mary Ray Memorial School	July 23, 2013 (#13000531)	771 Raymond Sheddan Ave. 33°20′09″N 84°43′02″W	Raymond	
21	Roscoe-Dunaway Gardens Historic District	Roscoe-Dunaway Gardens Historic District	December 6, 1996 (#96001414)	Roughly bounded by the Chattahoochee R., Cedar Cr., Hood Branch, and White Oak Cr. 33°29′54″N 84°50′00″W	Roscoe	
22	Sargent Historic District	Sargent Historic District	February 24, 2005 (#05000077)	Roughly centered on the Arnall Mill Complex at the junction of Georgia State Route 16 and Old Carrollton Rd. 33°25′52″N 84°52′03″W	Sargent	
23	Senoia Historic District	Senoia Historic District	March 17, 1989 (#89000149)	Roughly bounded by Couch St., CSX Transportation tracks, Georgia State Route 16, and Pylant St. 33°18′05″N 84°33′14″W	Senoia	
24	George R. Sims House	George R. Sims House	September 27, 1990 (#90001435)	1851 Collinsworth Rd. 33°29′31″N 84°37′08″W	Palmetto	
25	Dr. Robert L. and Sarah Alberta Smith House	Dr. Robert L. and Sarah Alberta Smith House	October 18, 1996 (#96001139)	1262 Bob Smith Rd. 33°22′49″N 84°38′43″W	Sharpsburg	
26	Tidwell-Amis-Haynes House	Tidwell-Amis-Haynes House	September 11, 1997 (#97001124)	1200 Sid Hunter Rd. 33°16′23″N 84°40′16″W	Senoia	
27	Vinewood	Vinewood	May 11, 2011 (#11000263)	1324 Roscoe Rd. 33°25′44″N 84°48′49″W	Newnan	
28	Willcoxon-Arnold House	Willcoxon-Arnold House	May 20, 1991 (#91000559)	One Bullsboro Dr. 33°22′55″N 84°47′35″W	Newnan	
