= National Register of Historic Places listings in McDonough County, Illinois =

Location of McDonough County in Illinois

This is a list of the National Register of Historic Places listings in McDonough County, Illinois.

This is intended to be a complete list of the properties and districts on the National Register of Historic Places in McDonough County, Illinois, United States. Latitude and longitude coordinates are provided for many National Register properties and districts; these locations may be seen together in a map.

There are 8 properties and districts listed on the National Register in the county.

This National Park Service list is complete through NPS recent listings posted March 21, 2025.

== Current listings ==
	Name on the Register	Image	Date listed	Location	City or town	Description
1	William S. Bailey House	William S. Bailey House	August 28, 2012 (#12000553)	100 S. Campbell St. 40°27′29″N 90°40′08″W	Macomb	
2	Moses King Brick and Tile Works	Moses King Brick and Tile Works	August 8, 2001 (#01000866)	738 N. Coal St. 40°26′02″N 90°47′48″W	Colchester	
3	Clarence Kleinkopf Round Barn	Clarence Kleinkopf Round Barn	August 26, 1982 (#82002586)	North of Colchester; 40°27′18″N 90°48′40″W	Colchester	
4	Lamoine Hotel	Lamoine Hotel	September 16, 2010 (#10000760)	201 N. Randolph St. 40°27′36″N 90°40′12″W	Macomb	
5	Macomb Courthouse Square Historic District	Macomb Courthouse Square Historic District	May 22, 2013 (#13000295)	Roughly bounded by E. and W. Washington, S. McArthur, E. Calhoun, and S. Campbell Sts. 40°27′34″N 90°40′16″W	Macomb	
6	McDonough County Courthouse	McDonough County Courthouse	October 30, 1972 (#72001448)	Public Sq. 40°27′33″N 90°39′58″W	Macomb	
7	Welling-Everly Horse Barn	Welling-Everly Horse Barn	August 29, 1985 (#85001911)	Off U.S. Route 136; 40°26′00″N 90°32′05″W	Adair	
8	Western Illinois State Normal School Building	Western Illinois State Normal School Building	May 20, 1998 (#98000470)	1 University Cir. 40°27′51″N 90°41′00″W	Macomb	

== See also ==
- List of National Historic Landmarks in Illinois
- National Register of Historic Places listings in Illinois
