= National Register of Historic Places listings in Talbot County, Georgia =

This is a list of properties and districts in Talbot County, Georgia that are listed on the National Register of Historic Places (NRHP).

This National Park Service list is complete through NPS recent listings posted March 21, 2025.

== Current listings ==
	Name on the Register	Image	Date listed	Location	City or town	Description
1	Frederick A. Bailey House		September 4, 1980 (#80001238)	U.S. 80; 32°39′26″N 84°32′06″W	Talbotton	Early interpretation of Greek Revival style, built in 1837.
2	Newton P. Carreker House	Newton P. Carreker House	August 26, 1980 (#80001239)	344 Jackson St. 32°40′46″N 84°32′21″W	Talbotton	
3	The Elms	The Elms	September 4, 2004 (#04000930)	GA 36 at 47 Rising Sun Rd., 3 mi. east of Woodland. 32°47′23″N 84°30′24″W	Woodland	Circa 1838
4	LeVert Historic District	LeVert Historic District	January 11, 1976 (#76000649)	Roughly bounded by Washington Ave., railroad tracks, Madison and Smith Sts. 32°40′28″N 84°32′19″W	Talbotton	
5	Lockhart-Cosby Plantation	Lockhart-Cosby Plantation	October 14, 1994 (#94001215)	GA 208 7 mi. E of Talbotton; 32°38′38″N 84°22′48″W	Talbot	
6	John Frank Mathews Plantation	John Frank Mathews Plantation	December 4, 1986 (#86003456)	US 80 at George Smith Rd. 32°42′37″N 84°21′36″W	Prattsburg	
7	David Shelton House	David Shelton House	September 17, 1980 (#80001240)	George W. Towns Ave. 32°41′10″N 84°32′04″W	Talbotton	
8	Martin and Lucretia Stamper House	Martin and Lucretia Stamper House	September 10, 2007 (#07000939)	3224 Flint Hill Hwy (GA 85E); 32°48′21″N 84°39′14″W	Shiloh	Greek Revival Plantation home built in 1833. Also known as "Merrywood".
9	Talbot County Courthouse	Talbot County Courthouse	September 18, 1980 (#80001241)	Courthouse Sq. 32°40′37″N 84°32′27″W	Talbotton	
10	George W. B. Towns House	George W. B. Towns House	May 7, 1973 (#73000644)	GA 208; 32°40′43″N 84°32′45″W	Talbotton	
11	Weeks-Kimbrough House	Weeks-Kimbrough House	December 27, 1979 (#79000747)	Washington Ave. 32°40′10″N 84°32′05″W	Talbotton	
12	Zion Episcopal Church	Zion Episcopal Church	May 8, 1974 (#74000702)	S of Talbotton on U.S. 80; 32°40′28″N 84°32′23″W	Talbotton	
