= Hollberg Hotel =

- U.S. National Register of Historic Places
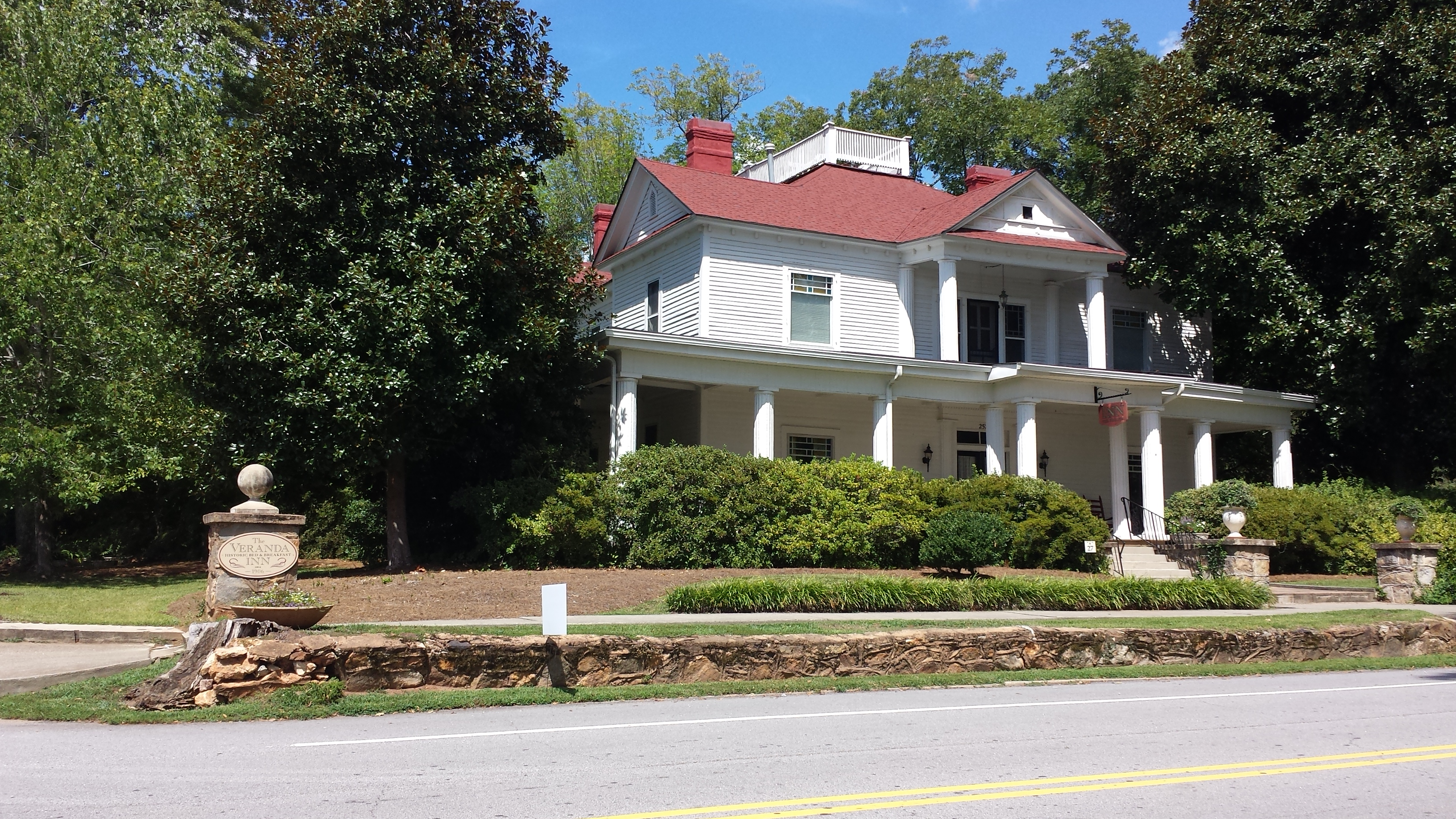

- Location within Georgia Location within the United States
- Location: Seavy and Barnes Sts., Senoia, Georgia
- Coordinates: 33°18′4″N 84°33′11″W
- Area: less than one acre
- Built: 1906
- NRHP reference No.: 80001007
- Added to NRHP: March 10, 1980

Hollberg Hotel is a historic hotel in Senoia, Georgia that is now operated as The Veranda Historic Inn. It was built 1906 in a Greek Revival architecture style and includes nine guest rooms, heart pine floors, tin ceilings, ornate light fixtures, chandeliers, 11 fireplaces, gardens, rocking chairs and a large veranda with porch swings. It was added to the National Register of Historic Places on March 10, 1980. The hotel is located on Seavy Street and Barnes Street. According to The Veranda's website many Confederate soldiers had reunions at the hotel; Margaret Mitchell interviewed Confederate Veterans for Gone With the Wind at the hotel; William Jennings Bryan was a guest in 1908 while running for President and the movie Broken Bridges featured the hotel in 2006.

== See also ==
- National Register of Historic Places listings in Coweta County, Georgia
