= Mary Ray Memorial School =

- U.S. National Register of Historic Places
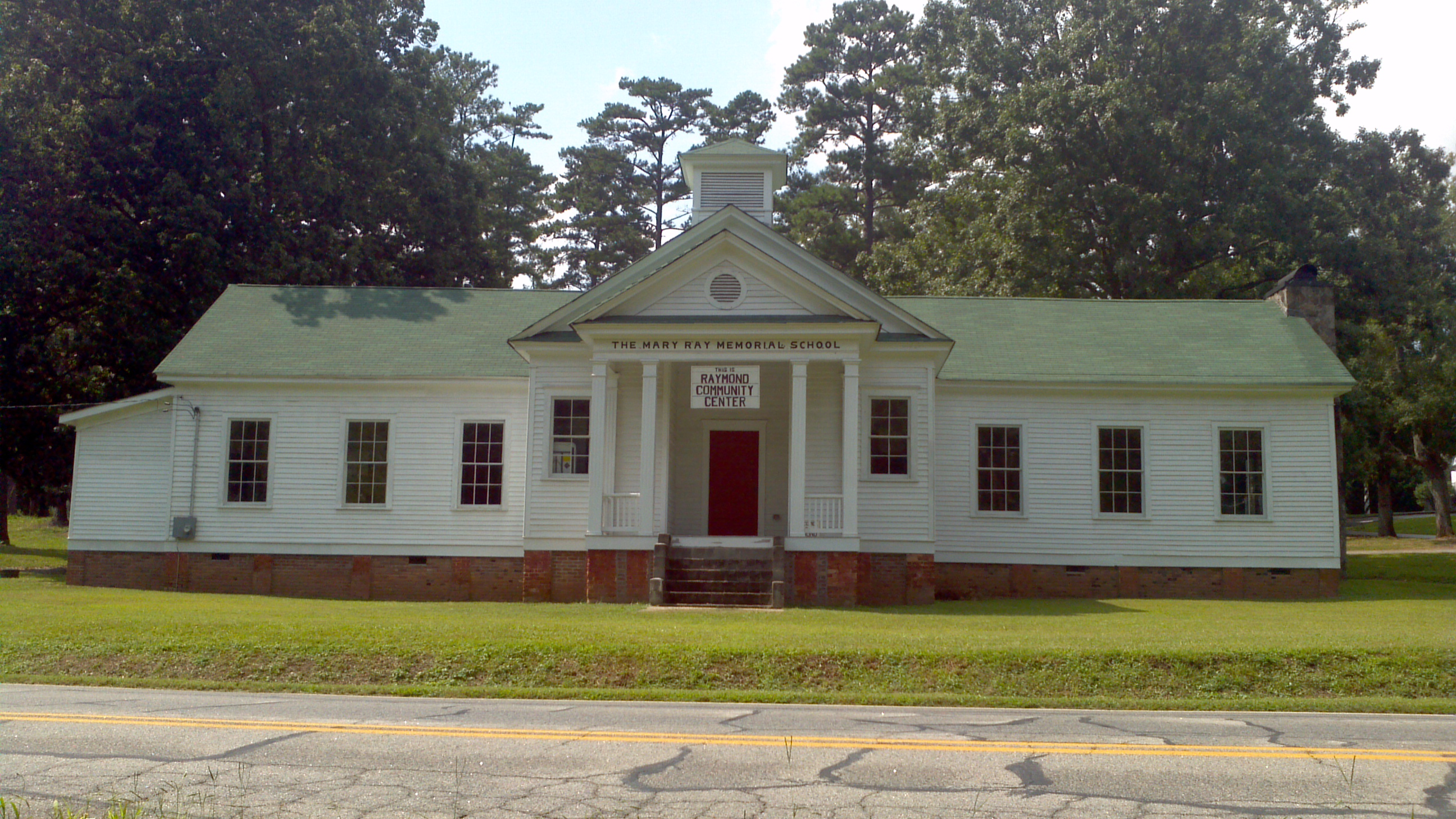

- Location within Georgia Location within the United States
- Location: 771 Raymond Sheddan Ave., Raymond, Coweta County, Georgia
- Coordinates: 33°20′09″N 84°43′02″W
- Built: 1908
- NRHP reference No.: 13000531
- Added to NRHP: July 23, 2013

The Mary Ray Memorial School, now the Raymond Community Center, is located on Raymond Sheddan Avenue in Raymond, Georgia, United States. It was listed on the National Register of Historic Places on July 23, 2013.

The school was founded in 1908 as a one-room schoolhouse. When it opened, it had around 30 students. In 1909, there were 60 enrolled students, and a wing was added. In 1910, it had over 100 students, and a second wing was built. The school was closed in 1948, and in the early 1950s the building was given to the community for a community club. In the mid-1980s, it fell into disrepair.

In 2007, new trustees were appointed, who met outside the building in the "kudzu" and decided to save it. Volunteer workers began the restoration in October 2007, and the work was completed in June 2011.

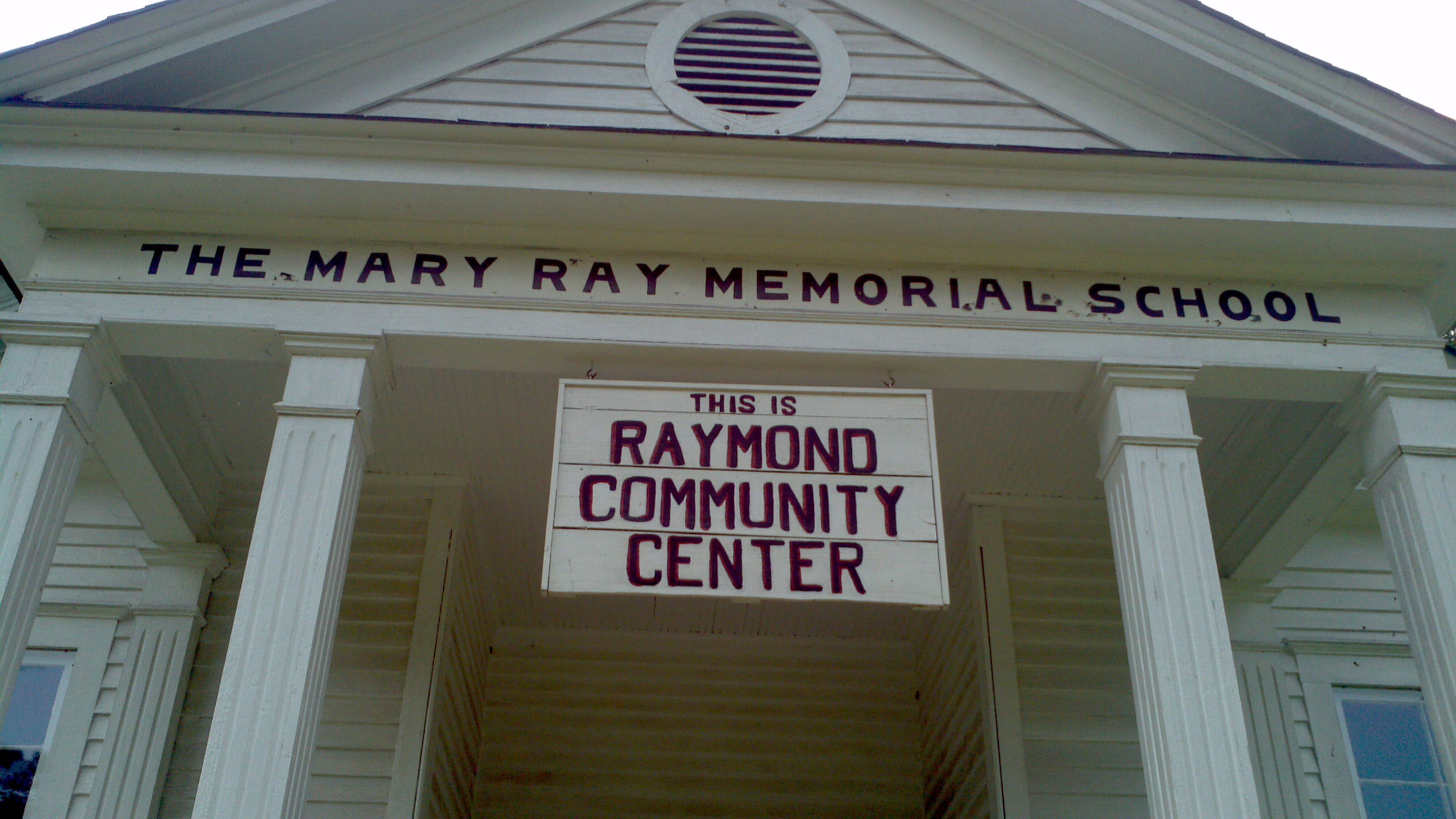
The Mary Ray Memorial School now serves as the Raymond Community Center.

== See also ==
- National Register of Historic Places listings in Coweta County, Georgia
