= Grantville Historic District =

Historic district in Georgia, United States

- U.S. National Register of Historic Places

- Location within Georgia
- Location: Bounded by US 29, LaGrange St., W. Grantville Rd. and the city cemetery, Grantville, Georgia
- Coordinates: 33°14′07″N 84°50′05″W
- Area: 192 acres (0.78 km^{2})
- Built: 1852
- Built by: Atlanta & LaGrange Railroad
- Architectural style: Mid 19th Century Revival, Late 19th and 20th Century Revivals, Late Victorian
- NRHP reference No.: 91000772
- Added to NRHP: June 14, 1991

The Grantville Historic District, in Grantville, Georgia, is a historic district which was listed on the National Register of Historic Places in 1991. The listing included 225 contributing buildings, a contributing structure, and a contributing site on 192 acres (0.78 km^{2}).

The district is bounded by U.S. Route 29, LaGrange St., W. Grantville Rd. and the city cemetery.

It includes railroad tracks through the center of the district, with commercial buildings on both sides, mostly brick buildings. It includes residential areas and two historic mill complexes with mill villages. It also includes a school, a waterworks, an auditorium, several churches and, on the eastern edge of the district, the city cemetery.

== Gallery ==
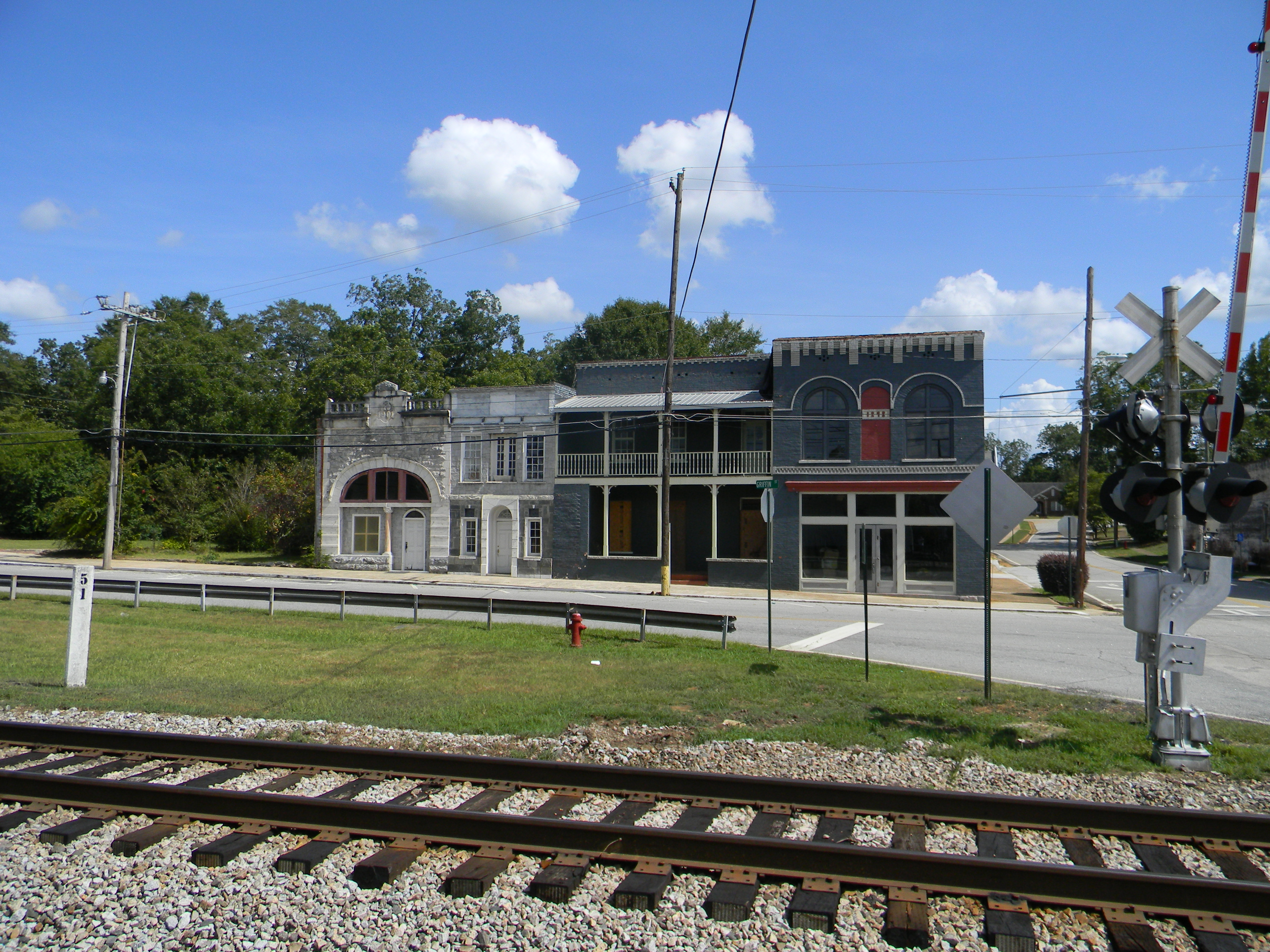
Griffin Street Buildings - August 2014

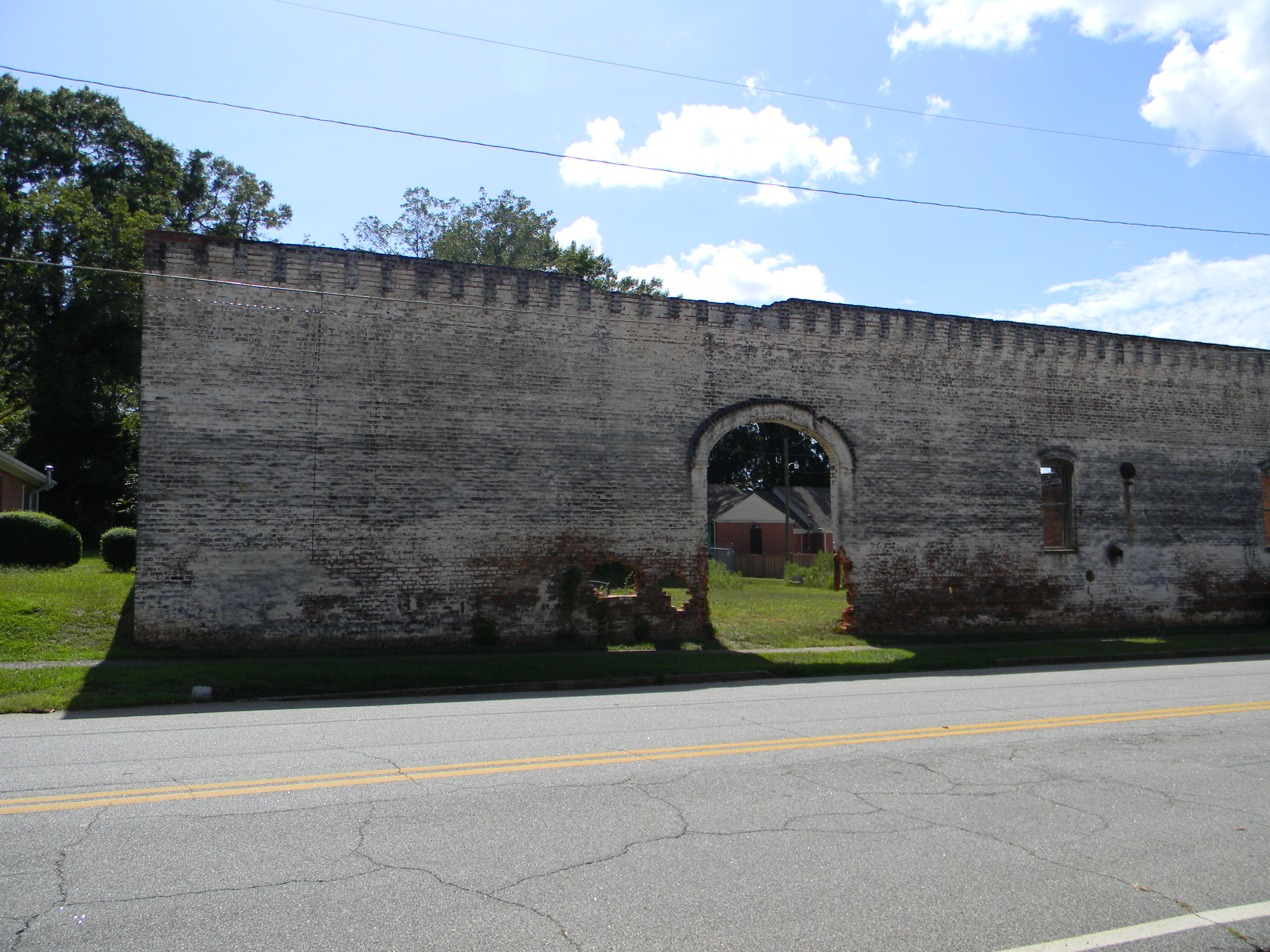
Abandoned Building - August 2014

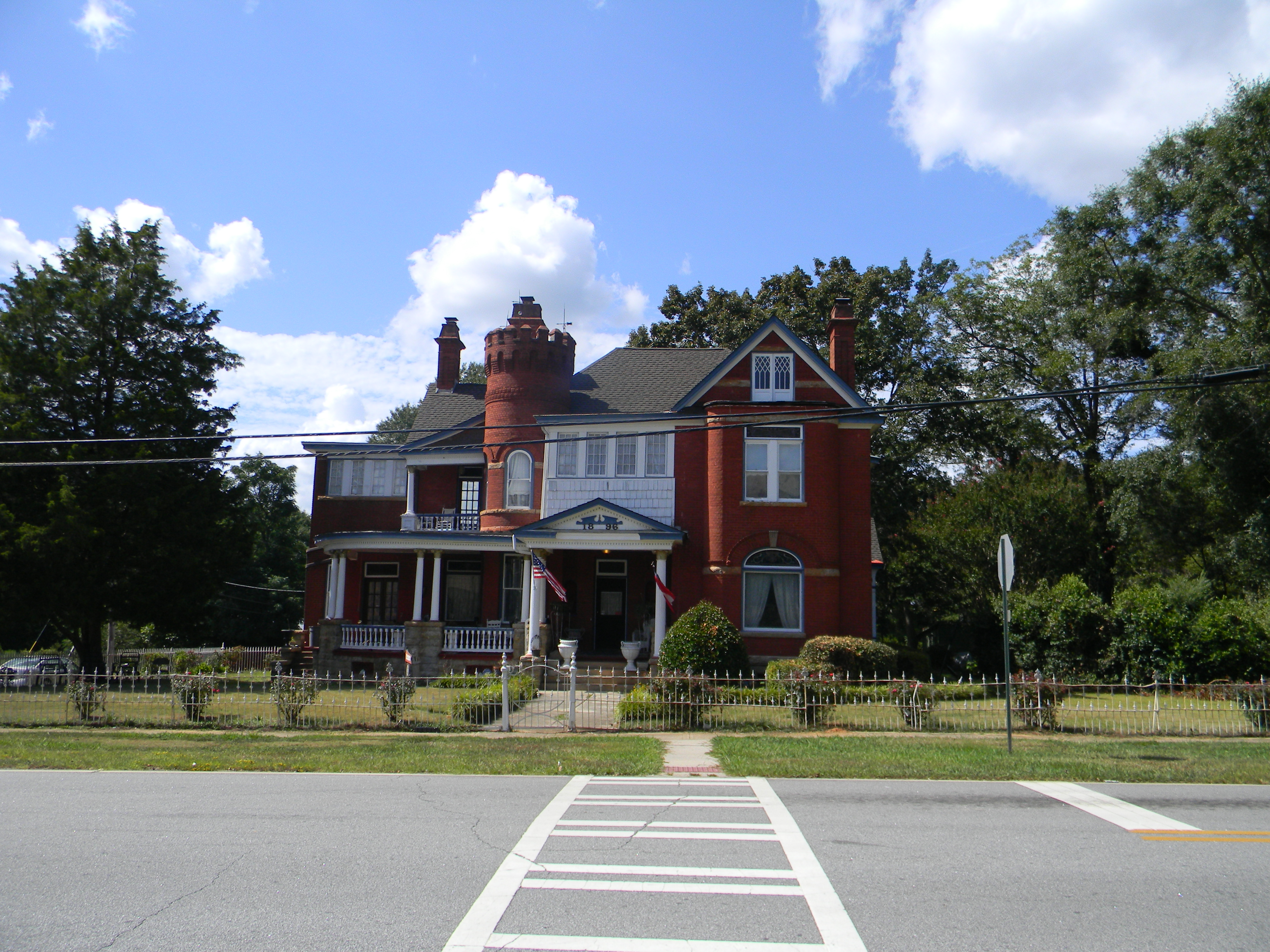
Bonnie Castle - August 2014

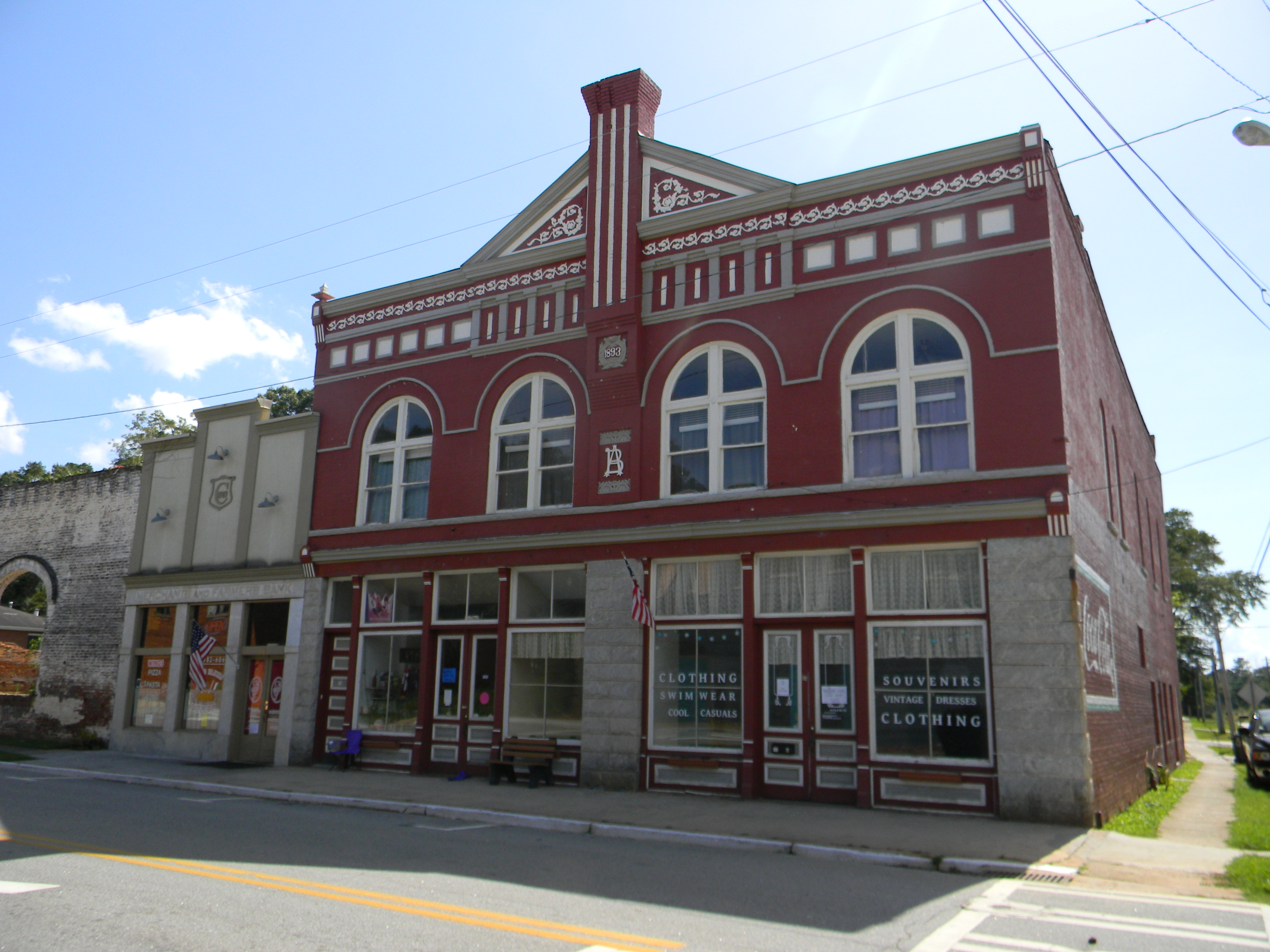
Banks and Arnold Store - August 2014

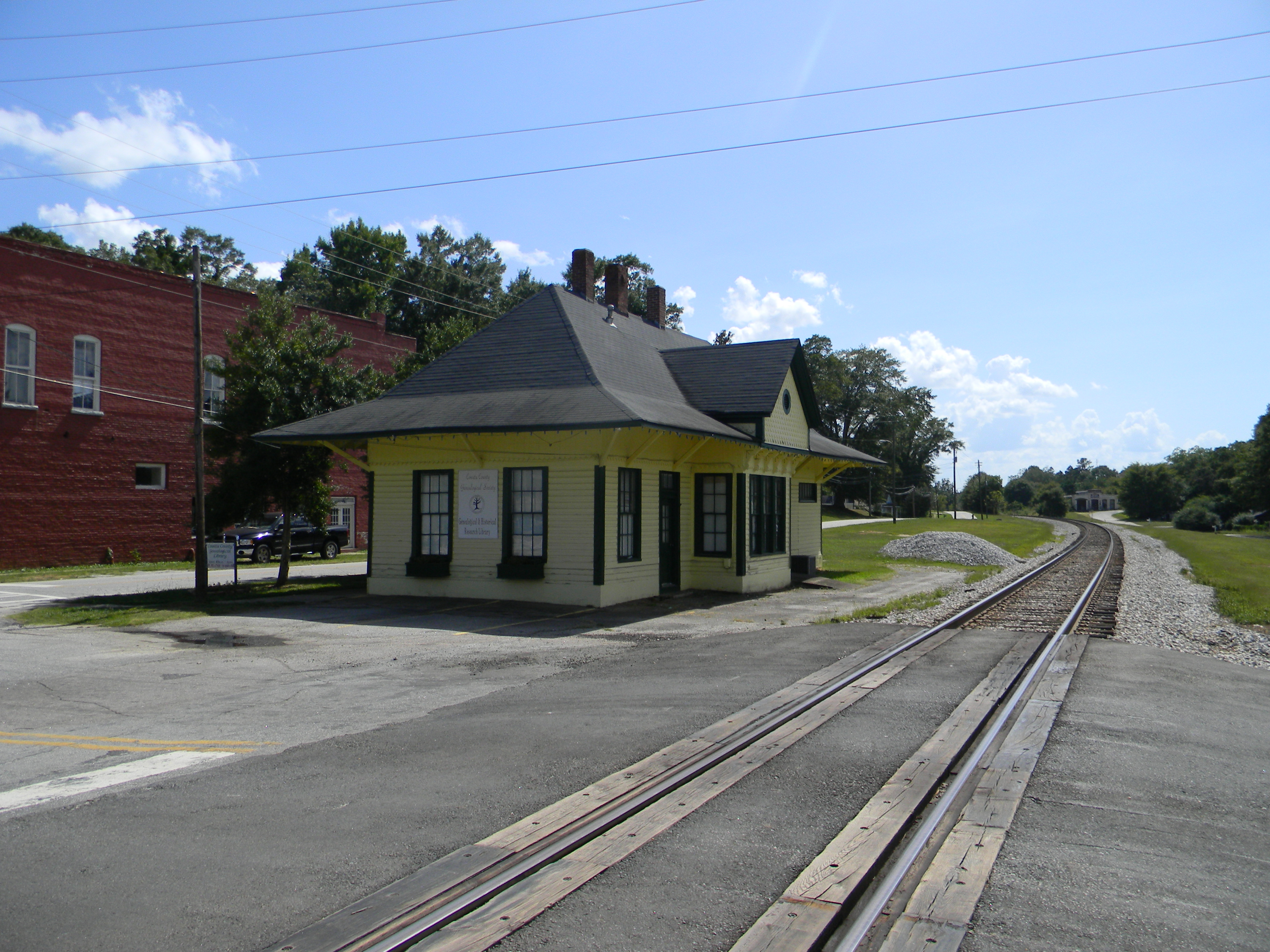
Passenger Depot - August 2014

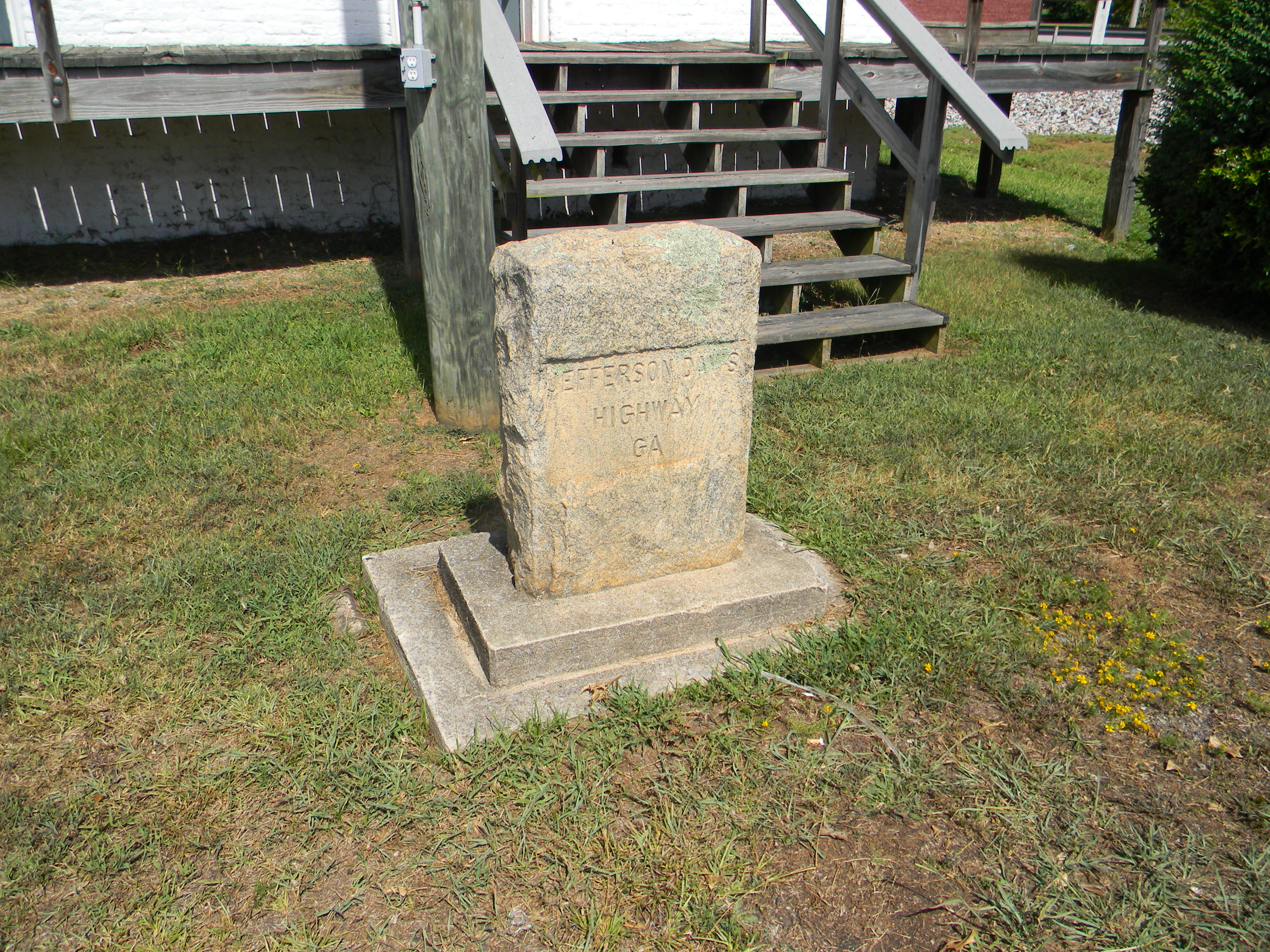
Jefferson Davis Highway Marker - August 2014
