= Powell Chapel School =

- U.S. National Register of Historic Places
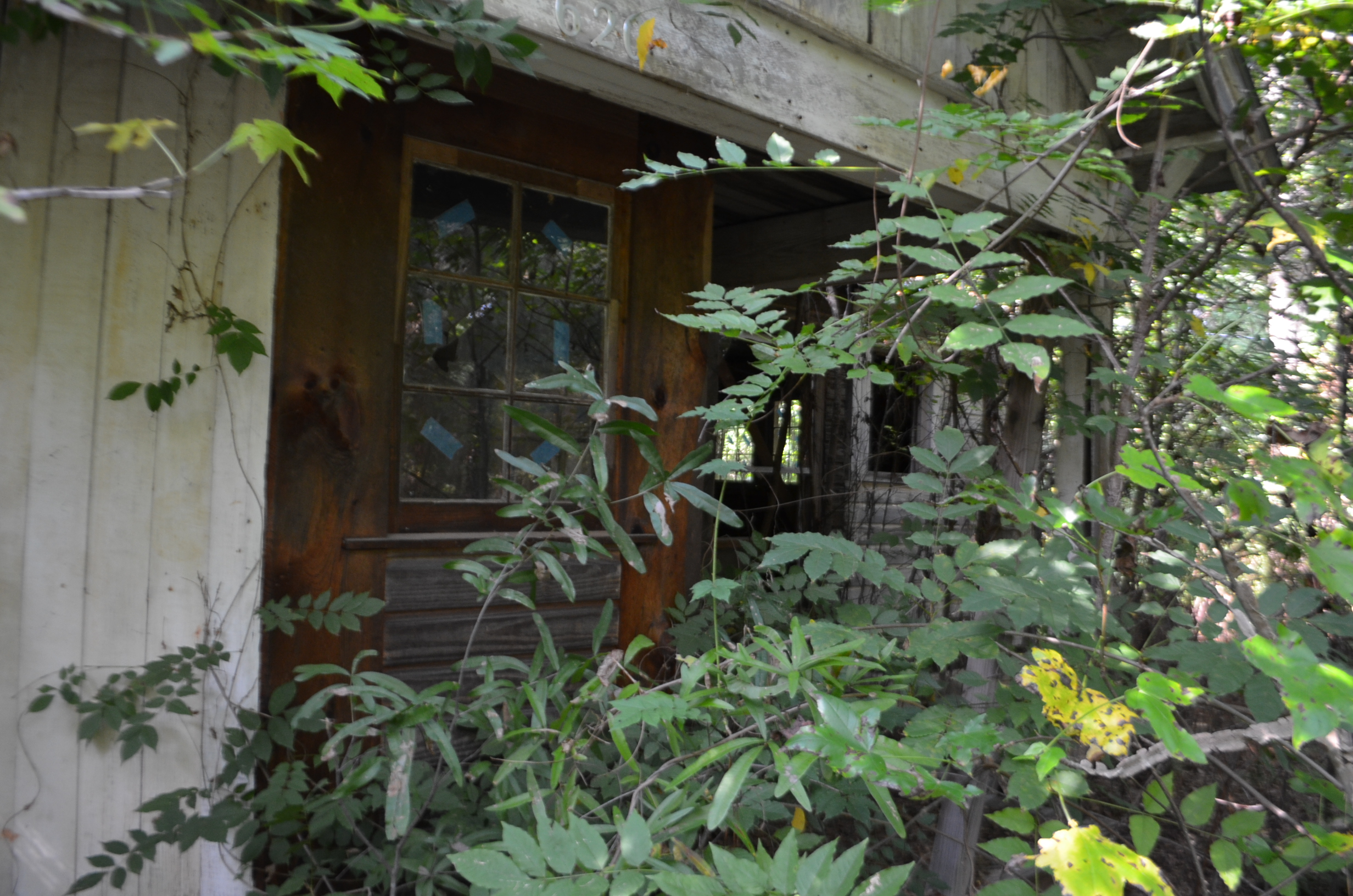
- The front of the building

- Location within Georgia
- Nearest city: Newnan, Georgia
- Coordinates: 33°24′56″N 84°47′06″W
- Area: 1 acre (0.40 ha)
- Built: 1937
- NRHP reference No.: 03000535
- Added to NRHP: June 23, 2003

Powell Chapel School is a historic school in Newnan, Georgia. It began as a school for black students at Powell Chapel Church. A one-room schoolhouse was built in 1937 and it was expanded with a second room in 1942. It was added to the National Register of Historic Places on June 23, 2003. It is located at 620 Old Atlanta Highway.

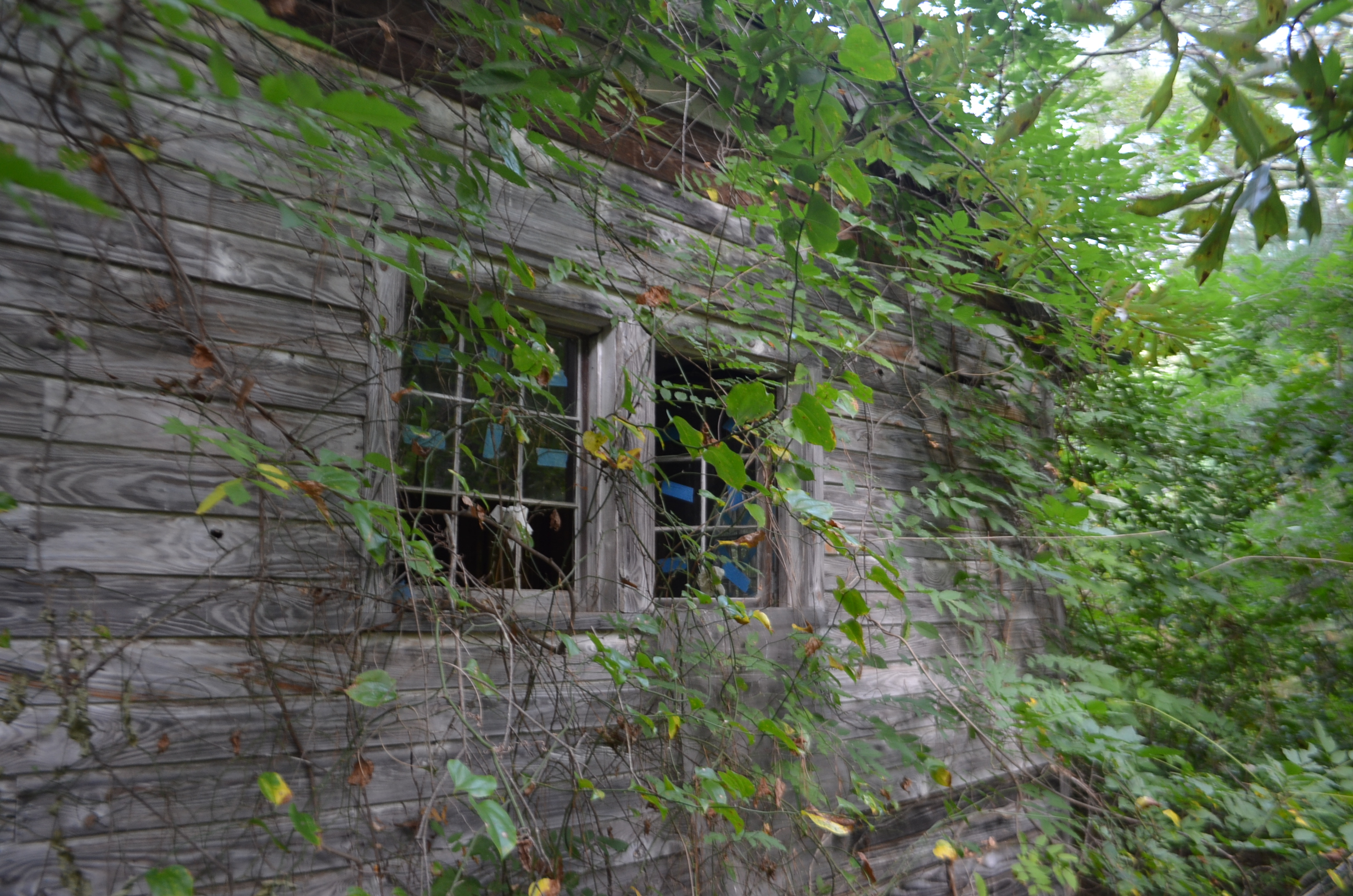
The side of the building

== See also ==
- National Register of Historic Places listings in Coweta County, Georgia
