= Woodland, Georgia =

- City
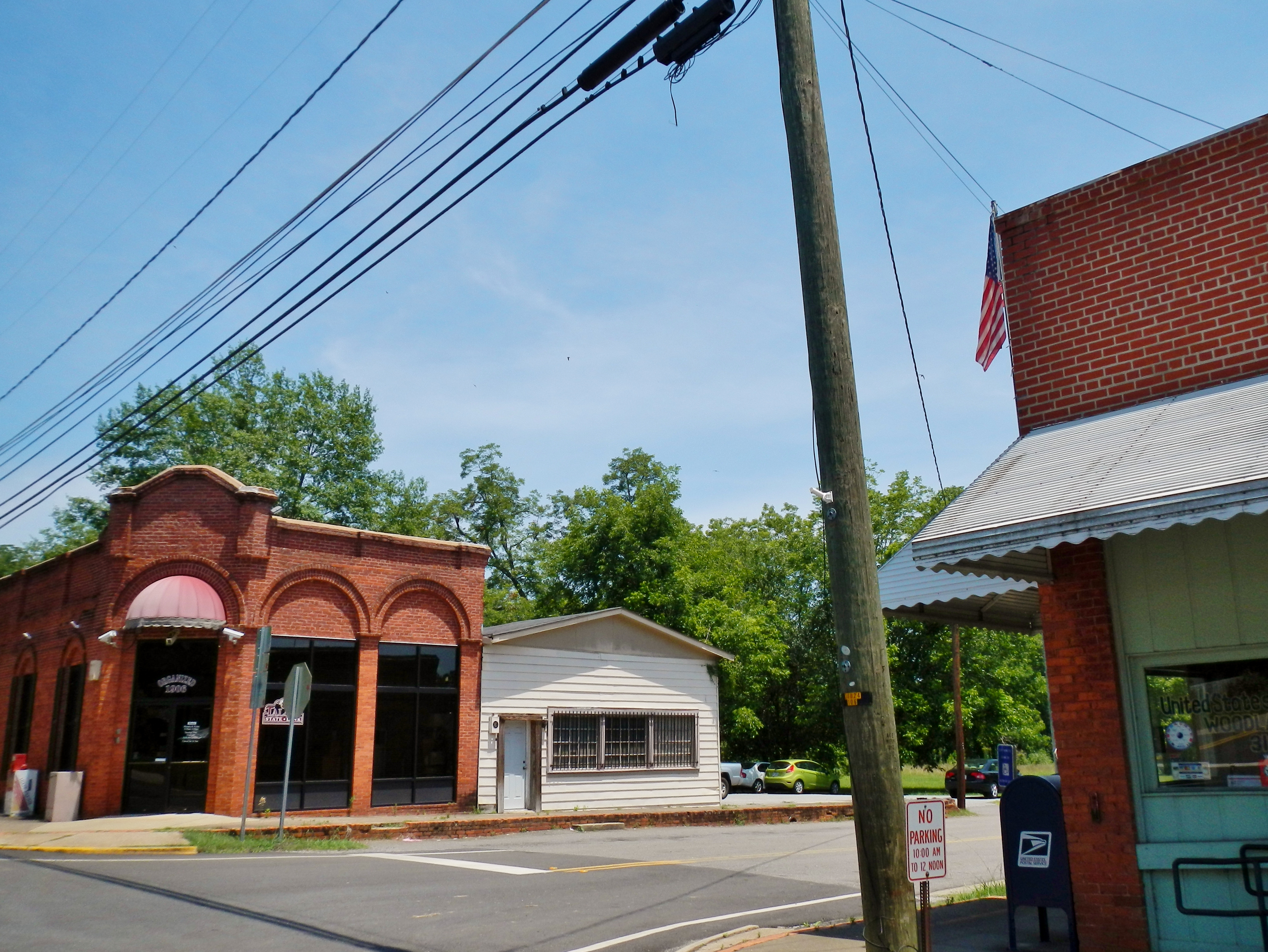
- Woodland in 2012.

- Location in Talbot County and the state of Georgia
- Coordinates: 32°47′15″N 84°33′40″W
- Country: United States
- State: Georgia
- County: Talbot

Area
  - Total: 0.79 sq mi (2.05 km^{2})
  - Land: 0.78 sq mi (2.03 km^{2})
  - Water: 0.0039 sq mi (0.01 km^{2})
- Elevation: 791 ft (241 m)

Population (2020)
  - Total: 305
  - Density: 388.4/sq mi (149.98/km^{2})
- Time zone: UTC-5 (Eastern (EST))
  - Summer (DST): UTC-4 (EDT)
- ZIP code: 31836
- Area code: 706
- FIPS code: 13-83952
- GNIS feature ID: 0356649
- Website: https://www.cityofwoodlandga.org/

Woodland is a city in Talbot County, Georgia, United States. The population was 305 in 2020.

== History ==
The community was named after C.S. Woods, original owner of the town site. The Georgia General Assembly incorporated Woodland as a town in 1908.

== Geography ==
Woodland is located at 32°47′15″N 84°33′40″W (32.787594, -84.561018). According to the United States Census Bureau, the city has a total area of 0.8 square miles (2.1 km^{2}), all land.

== Demographics ==
Historical population
Census	Pop.	Note	%±
1910	189		—
1920	356		88.4%
1930	463		30.1%
1940	489		5.6%
1950	621		27.0%
1960	720		15.9%
1970	689		−4.3%
1980	664		−3.6%
1990	552		−16.9%
2000	432		−21.7%
2010	408		−5.6%
2020	305		−25.2%
U.S. Decennial Census; 1850-1870 1870-1880; 1890-1910 1920-1930; 1940 1950 1960; 1970 1980 1990; 2000 2010 2020

=== Racial and ethnic composition ===
Woodland city, Georgia – Racial and ethnic composition Note: the US Census treats Hispanic/Latino as an ethnic category. This table excludes Latinos from the racial categories and assigns them to a separate category. Hispanics/Latinos may be of any race.
Race / Ethnicity (NH = Non-Hispanic)	Pop 2000	Pop 2010	Pop 2020	% 2000	% 2010	% 2020
White alone (NH)	90	95	55	20.83%	23.28%	18.03%
Black or African American alone (NH)	336	307	236	77.78%	75.25%	77.38%
Native American or Alaska Native alone (NH)	1	3	1	0.23%	0.74%	0.33%
Asian alone (NH)	0	0	1	0.00%	0.00%	0.33%
Native Hawaiian or Pacific Islander alone (NH)	0	0	0	0.00%	0.00%	0.00%
Other race alone (NH)	1	0	1	0.23%	0.00%	0.33%
Mixed race or Multiracial (NH)	3	3	5	0.69%	0.74%	1.64%
Hispanic or Latino (any race)	1	0	6	0.23%	0.00%	1.97%
Total	432	408	305	100.00%	100.00%	100.00%

=== 2000 census ===
As of the census of 2000, there were 432 people, 181 households, and 131 families residing in the city. In 2020, its population declined to 305.

== Gallery ==
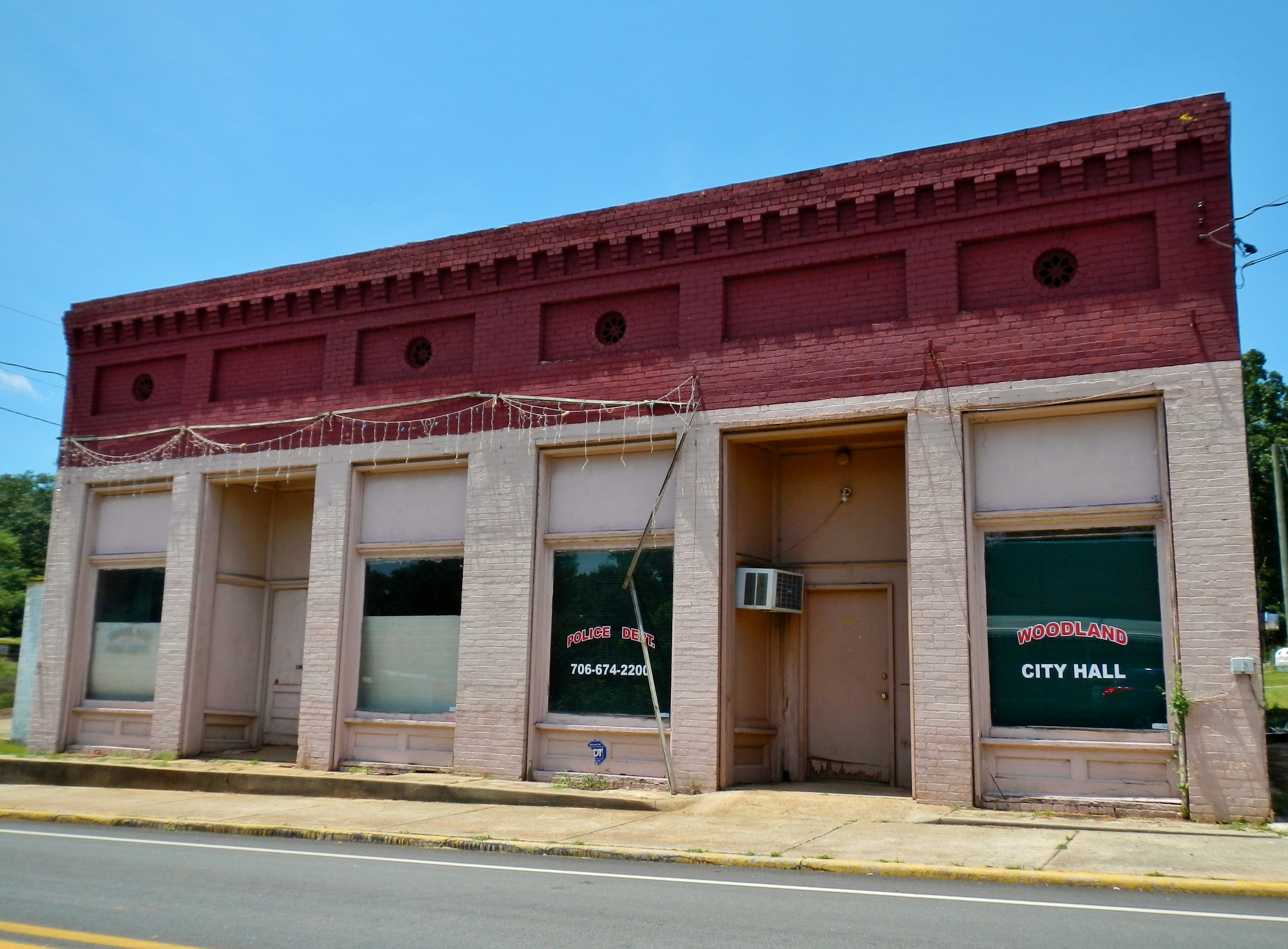
Woodland City Hall and Police Department

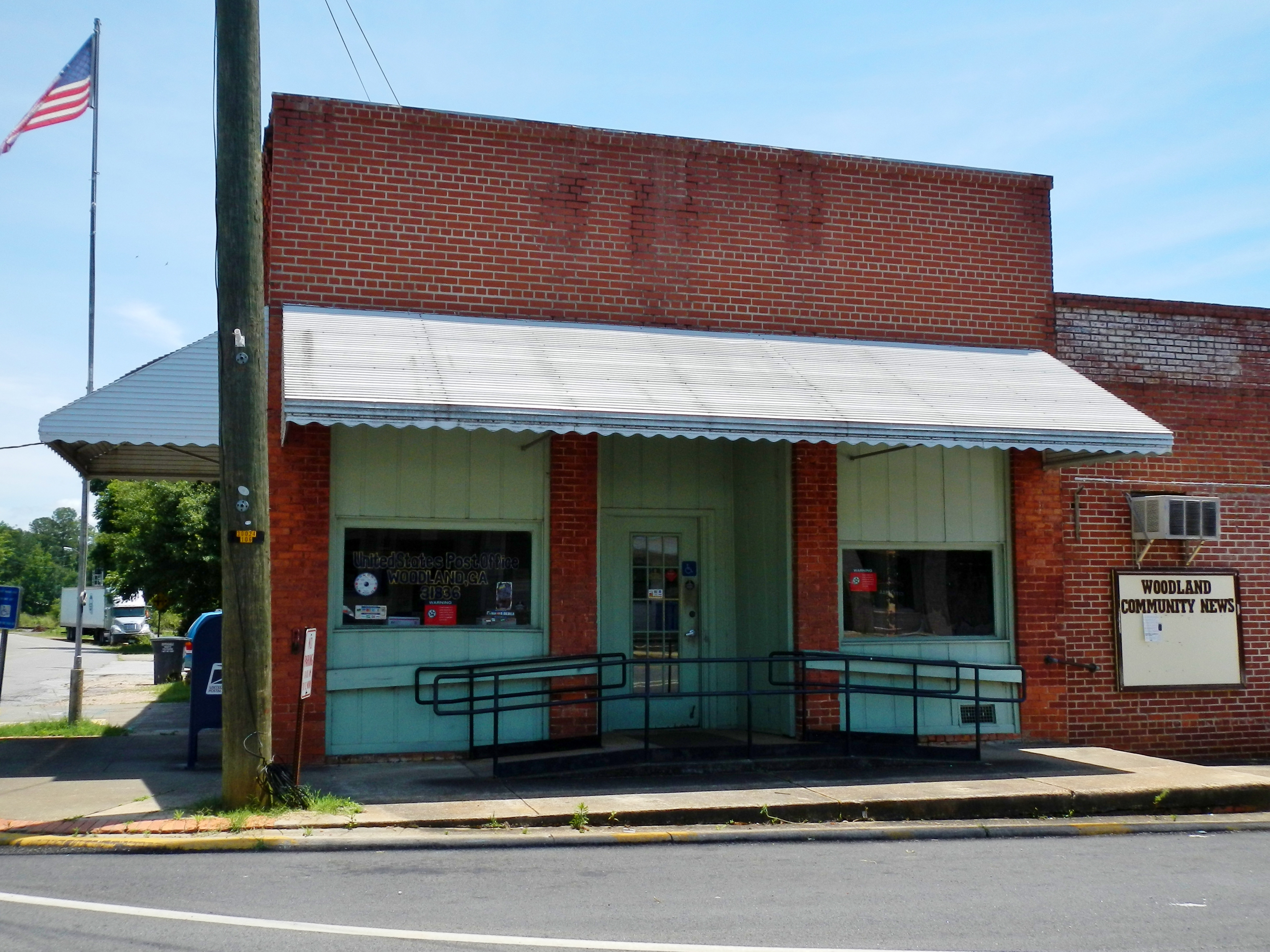
Woodland Post Office (ZIP code: 31836)

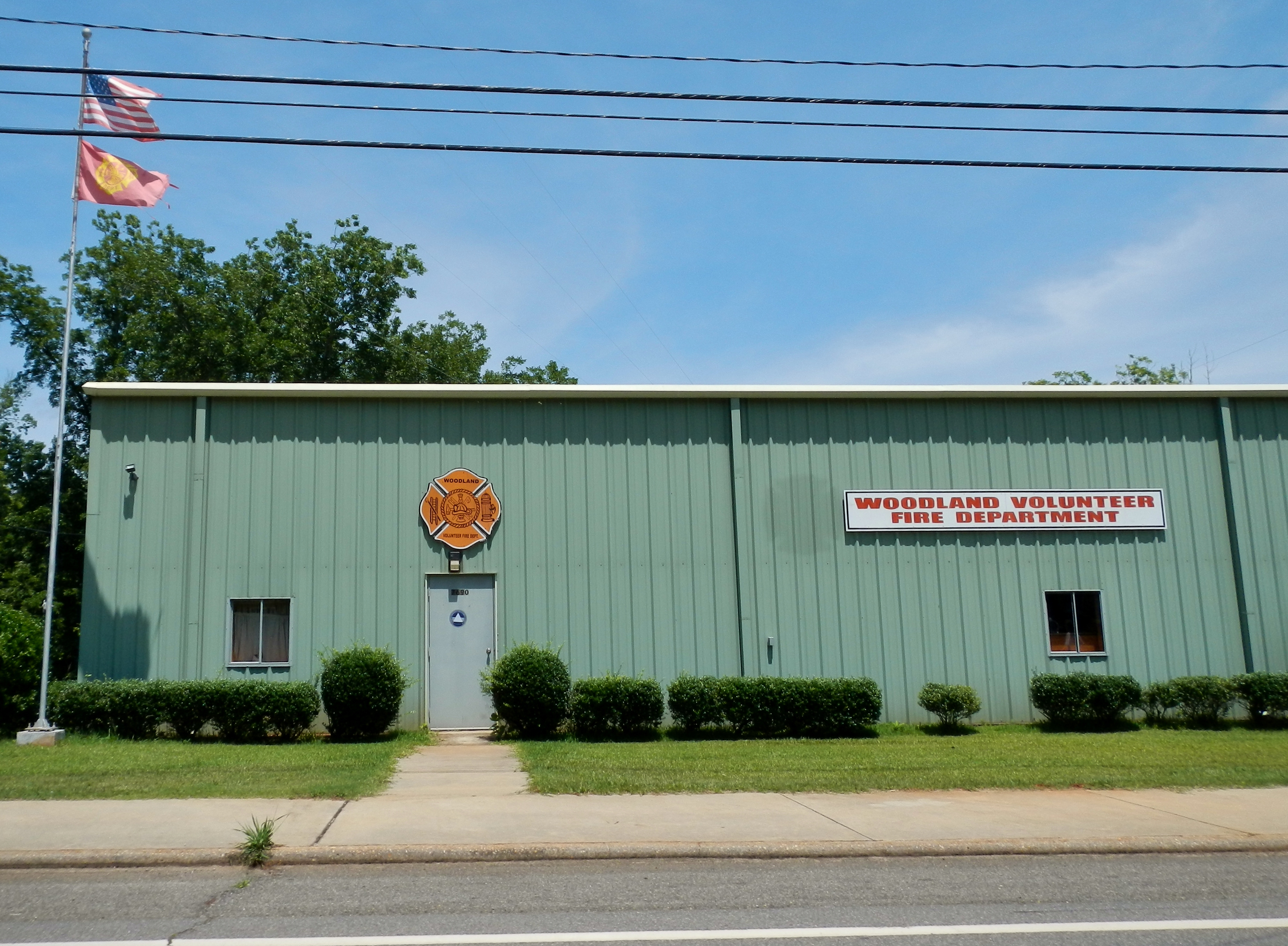
Woodland Volunteer Fire Department

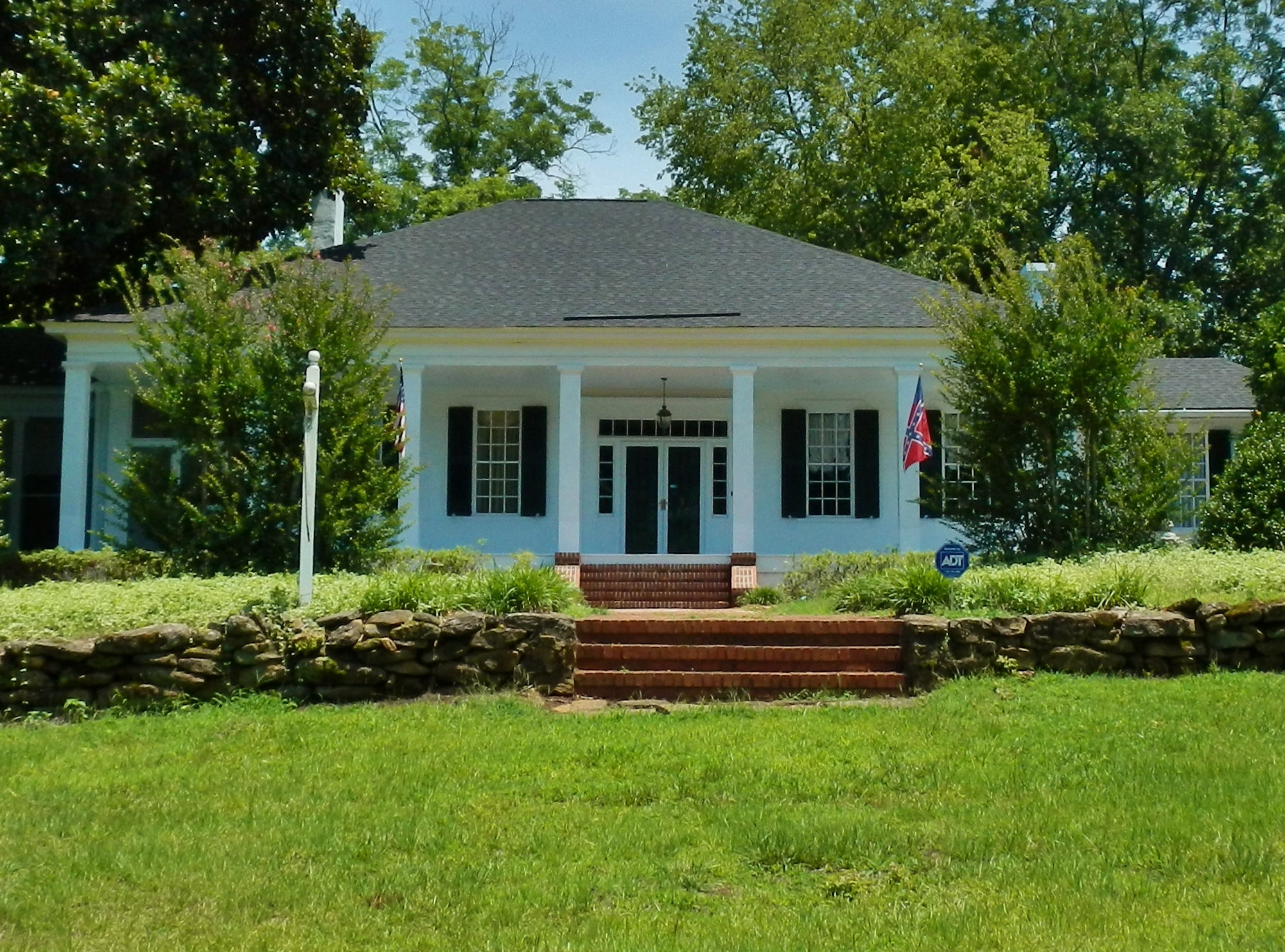
Located three miles east of Woodland, The Elms was built in 1838 and placed on the National Register of Historic Places. Robert H. Dixon, a Georgia State Senator and State Representative (1843) from Talbot County, owned this land from 1827 to 1857.
