= Dodge-Bailey House =

- U.S. National Register of Historic Places
- Location within New Mexico
- Location: 3775 Old Santa Fe Trail, Santa Fe, New Mexico
- Coordinates: 35.6593609°N 105.9202517°W
- Area: 5.5 acres (2.2 ha)
- Built: 1940
- Architect: John Gaw Meem
- Architectural style: Pueblo Revival
- NRHP reference No.: 07000414
- Added to NRHP: May 8, 2007

The Dodge-Bailey House, at 3775 Old Santa Fe Trail in Santa Fe, New Mexico, was built in 1940. It was listed on the National Register of Historic Places in 2007.

It was a work of architect John Gaw Meem in Pueblo Revival style.

It is in the lower part of Sun Mountain.
