= George A. and Mary Tinkel Bailey House =

Historic house in Iowa, United States

- U.S. National Register of Historic Places
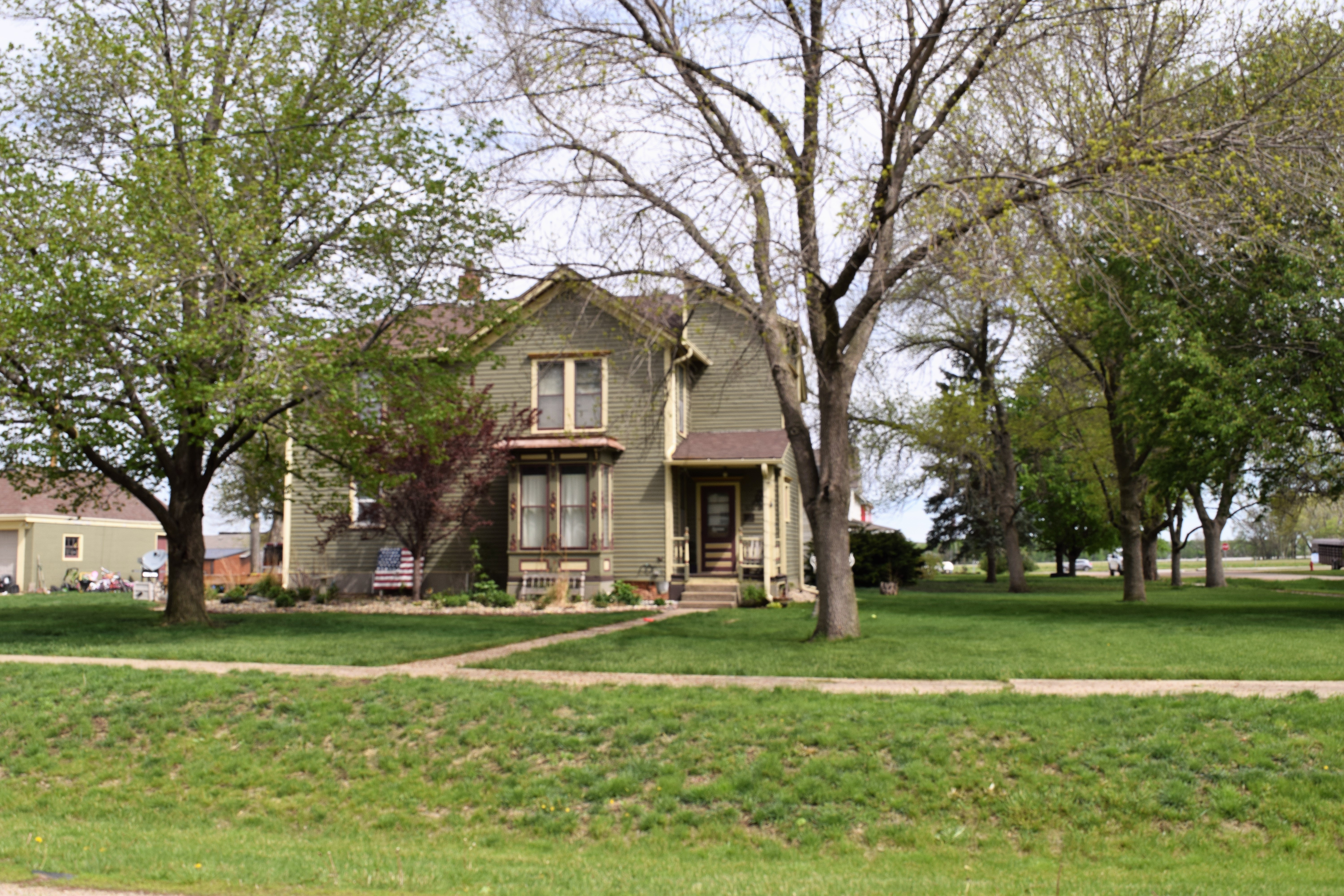

- Location within Iowa Location within the United States
- Location: 423 10th St. Correctionville, Iowa
- Coordinates: 42°28′52.5″N 95°47′4.3″W
- Area: less than one acre
- Built: 1883
- Built by: Weiner and Estes
- Architectural style: Queen Anne
- NRHP reference No.: 98000929
- Added to NRHP: August 5, 1998

The George A. and Mary Tinkel Bailey House is a historic building located in Correctionville, Iowa, United States. Bailey was a native of Litchfield County, Connecticut, and he established the first bank in town after settling here in 1882. The name of the Sioux Valley State Bank was changed to the Bailey State Bank under a new charter in 1902. In addition to this house, Bailey was also responsible for the first brick commercial blocks in town. He built his house on the north side of town in an attempt to move the town out of the flood plain. William Jennings Bryan stayed in the home in 1911 while he was in town speaking at a Chautauqua. The two-story frame Queen Anne features elements from the Stick/Eastlake styles. The building was listed on the National Register of Historic Places in 1998.
