= Sun Mountain Sports =

Montana-based manufacturer of golf equipment

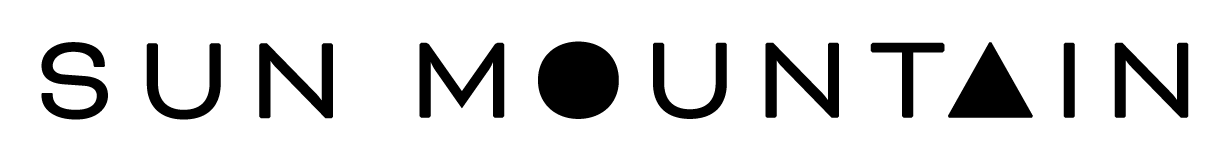
- Type: Private
- Industry: Sporting goods
- Founded: 1981
- Founder: Rick Reimers
- Headquarters: Missoula, Montana, United States
- Key people: Rick Reimers (Founder); Ed Kowachek (Former CEO); Grant Knudson (Current CEO)
- Products: Golf equipment Apparel
- Website: www.sunmountain.com

Sun Mountain Sports, often referred to simply as Sun Mountain, is an American manufacturer of golf equipment based in Missoula, Montana. Since its founding in 1981, the company has introduced several innovations in golf equipment, such as lightweight golf bags, the golf bag with built-in legs, golf push carts, waterproof golf bags, stretchable/waterproof golf jackets, and double-strap golf bags.

== History ==
Rick Reimers, a golf professional from California, first experimented with lightweight nylon golf bags in the late 1970s. At the time, golf bags were heavy, crafted from leather or vinyl. Reimers founded Sun Mountain in 1981 and moved the company to Missoula, Montana, in 1984. That same year, he produced the Front 9 model, which became the company's first commercial success. His Eclipse bag from 1986 was the first lightweight golf bag with a built-in stand.

Sun Mountain added its outerwear line in 1990. It was the first company, along with Izzo, to introduce double bag straps in the 1990s. Furthermore, it developed the first two-ply wind shirt in the United States, as well as the first golf push cart. Sun Mountain was one of the four producers that dominated the American golf bag industry in 1992.

The company created a new line of golf products with the introduction of the "Speed Cart", the first easily foldable, three-wheeled push cart, in 1999. Sun Mountain was the first golf bag brand to introduce waterproof bags in 2007.

In 2010, Sun Mountain was the biggest American maker of golf bags, with its bags accounting for 16.5 percent of the golf bag share sales in the country. It employed 140 people. By 2013, there were 200 employees.

== Equipment ==
Sun Mountain produces golf carry bags, cart bags, push carts, golf travel bags, and golf rainwear and outerwear. It prioritizes ease of use.

Its 2Five golf bag weighs only two and a half pounds. The C-130 cart bag and the 4.5 carry bag include integrated portable power packs to charge mobile devices. Sun Mountain patented a bag carrying system called "Zero-Gravity Technology," which transfers the weight of the bag from the shoulders to the hips.

The company has a ClubGlider golf travel case line. The best-known product of the line, the ClubGlider Meridian, is made from ballistic nylon, has two sets of wheels and a unique leg mechanism that extends and retracts, reducing 45 pounds of pressure on the arms and shoulders according to the company.

== Recognition ==
Sun Mountain won four Golf Digest awards for golf equipment in 2017: its 2Five bag won in the Lightweight category, the 3.5LS in Carry, the C-130 in Cart, and the 5.5LS in Hybrid. Finally, the Club Glider Meridian was chosen as the Best Travel Cover. In 2016, the company had won three awards: the C-130 in Golf Cart, the 2Five in Lightweight, and the ClubGlider Meridian in the Best Golf Travel Cover award.

Sun Mountain has been one of the National Golf Foundation's Top 100 Businesses in Golf for years.

The company provided the outerwear for the United States team at the Presidents Cup from 2011 to 2013.
