= Moses King Brick and Tile Works =

- King, Moses, Brick and Tile Works
- U.S. National Register of Historic Places
- U.S. Historic district
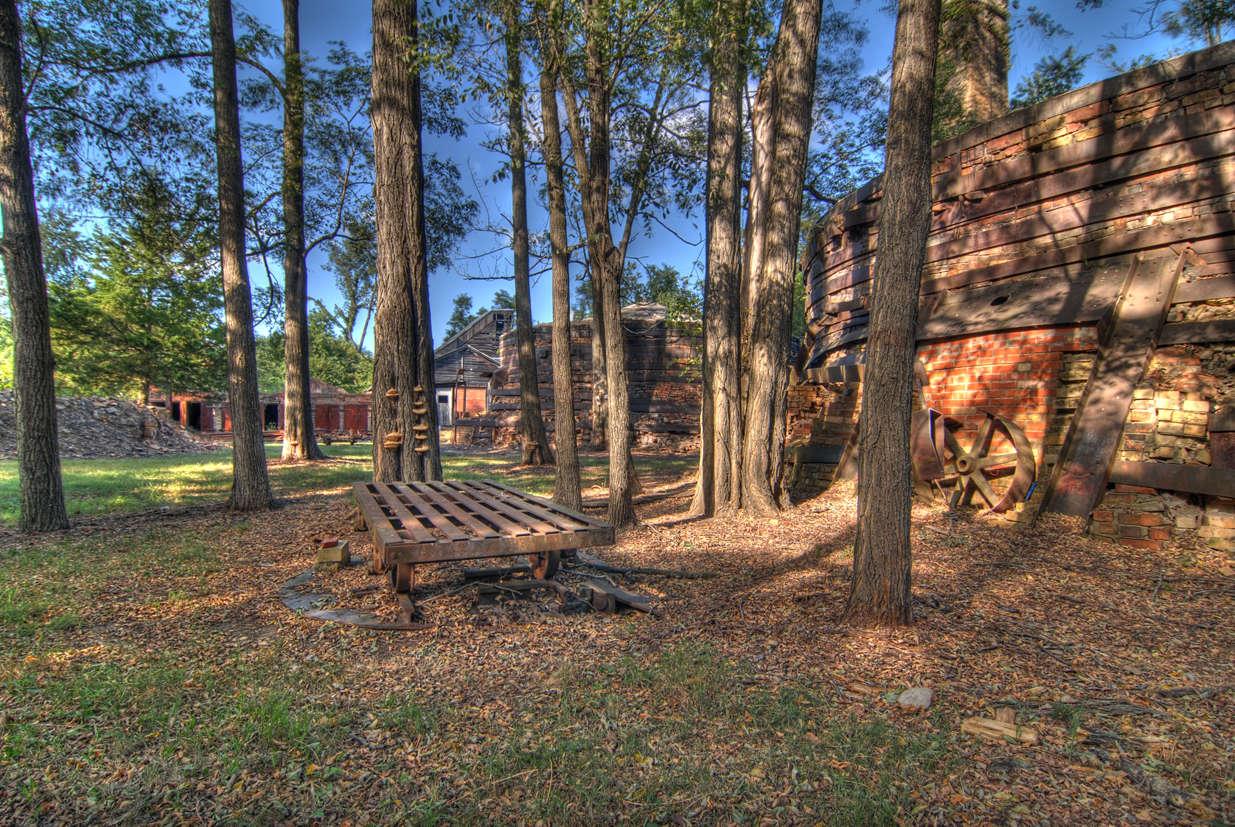
- Two of the kilns, with the factory building in the distance

- Location within Illinois Location within the United States
- Location: 738 N. Coal St., Colchester, Illinois
- Coordinates: 40°26′02″N 90°47′48″W
- Area: 9 acres (3.6 ha)
- Built: 1881
- Built by: King, Moses
- NRHP reference No.: 01000866
- Added to NRHP: August 8, 2001

The Moses King Brick and Tile Works is a historic brickworks located at 738 North Coal Street in Colchester, Illinois. The complex includes King's Folk Victorian home, four of the original seven beehive kilns, the factory building and its drying tunnels, two exhaust stacks, and various outbuildings. Moses King established the brickworks on his own land, which held one of the county's richest clay deposits, in 1881. The brickworks was a major part of Colchester's clay industry, which developed as a way of using excess coal from the city's more prominent coal mining industry; it eventually became one of the city's main economic drivers, along with coal and the railroad. While coal and clay both declined in Colchester in the twentieth century, the brickworks survived as a producer of buff brick, ultimately becoming the last surviving brickworks in the city. It closed in the 1960s when buff brick declined in favor of colored brick, which could be more easily obtained from other sources.

The brickworks was added to the National Register of Historic Places on August 8, 2001.

The Brick and Tile Works is permanently closed and does not allow visitors.
