= William H. and Alice Bailey House =

Historic house in Iowa, United States

- U.S. National Register of Historic Places
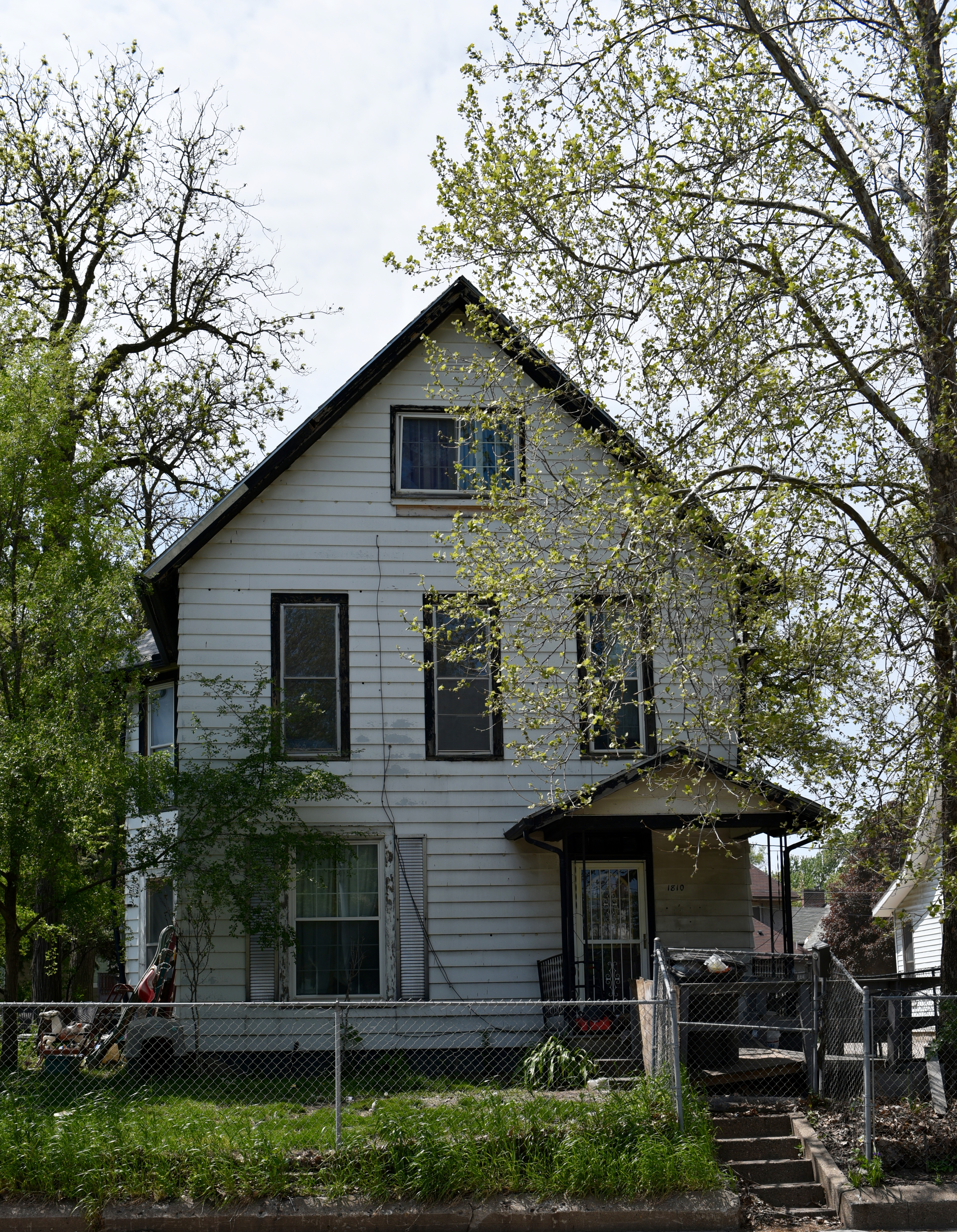

- Location within Iowa Location within the United States
- Location: 1810 6th Ave. Des Moines, Iowa
- Coordinates: 41°36′38.1″N 93°37′33.8″W
- Area: less than one acre
- Built: 1889
- Architectural style: Late Victorian
- MPS: Towards a Greater Des Moines MPS
- NRHP reference No.: 96001148
- Added to NRHP: October 25, 1996

The William H. and Alice Bailey House is a historic building located in Des Moines, Iowa. It is a two-story, balloon frame, front gable dwelling. Its significance is attributed to its association with the Baileys.

== History ==
William Bailey was the city attorney for the cities of North Des Moines and Des Moines. He is associated with the Annexation Movement in Des Moines in the late-1880s, and he agitated for municipal reform that led to the adoption of the Des Moines Plan in 1907. He worked to improve public education in Iowa, and served as a member of the School Commission in 1907.

Alice Bailey was a progressive social reformer who promoted reforms to public health, education, municipal beautification, care for the elderly, children, and young women in need. She helped to initiate the introduction of child labor legislation in the Iowa General Assembly, and she was responsible for establishing institutions that cared for the aged and infirm in Des Moines. The house was listed on the National Register of Historic Places in 1996.
