= William Bailey House =

Historic house in New York, United States

- U.S. National Register of Historic Places
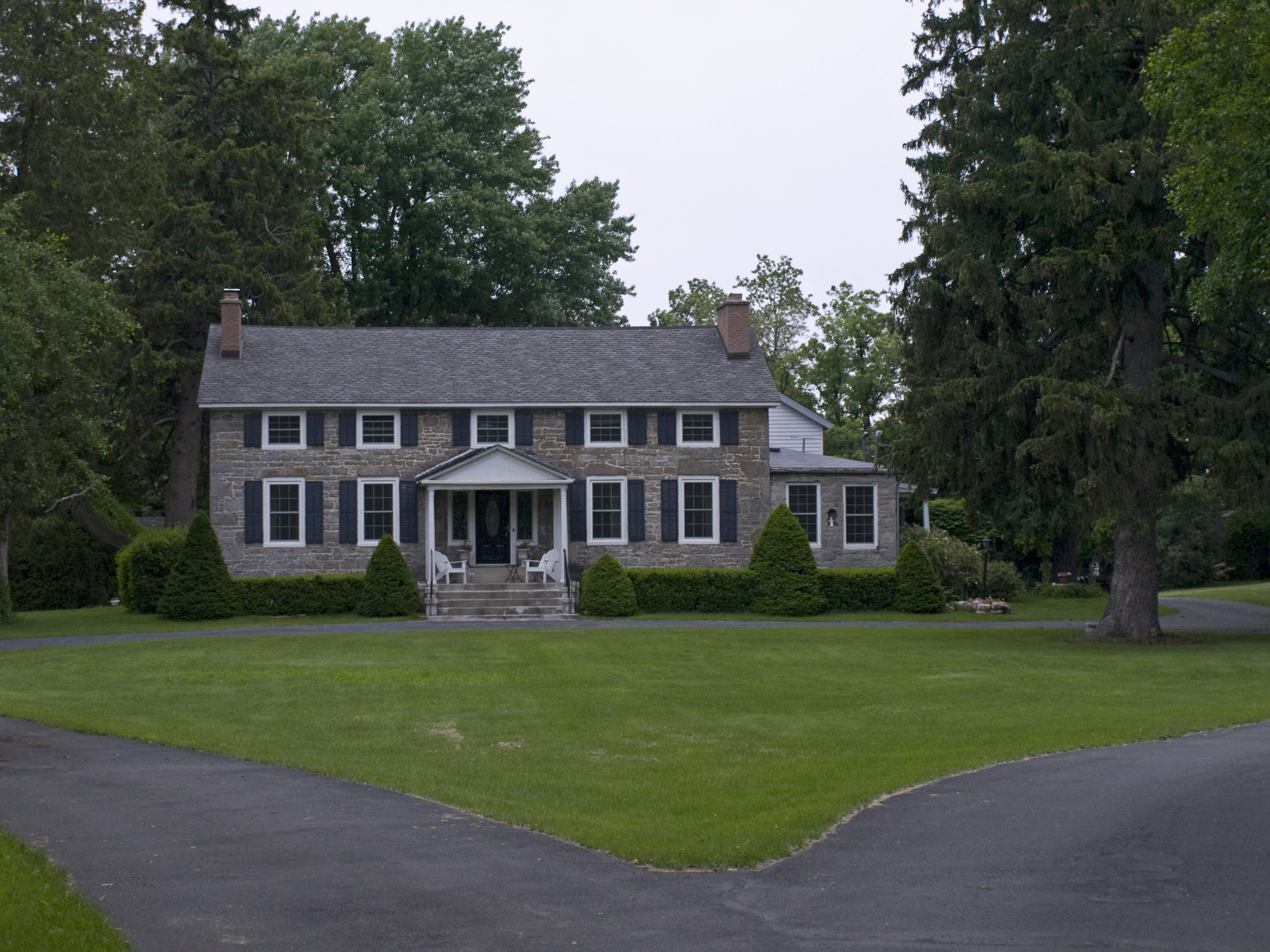
- William Bailey House from the south

- Location within New York Location within the United States
- Location: 176 Cornelia St., Plattsburgh, New York
- Coordinates: 44°42′3″N 73°27′53″W
- Area: 2.3 acres (0.93 ha)
- Built: 1825
- Architect: n/a
- Architectural style: Early Republic
- MPS: Plattsburgh City MRA
- NRHP reference No.: 82001098
- Added to NRHP: November 12, 1982

The William Bailey House is a historic house located at 176 Cornelia Street in Plattsburgh, Clinton County, New York.

== Description and history ==
It was built in about 1825 in the “Early Republic” style and is a 1 1/2-story, five-bay wide, stone-framed building. It features two symmetrical brick end chimneys piercing its gabled roof and oversized eyebrow windows under the eaves, as well as a one-story wing on one side.

It was listed on the National Register of Historic Places on November 12, 1982.
