= Harry Bailey House =

Historic house in Tennessee, United States

- U.S. National Register of Historic Places
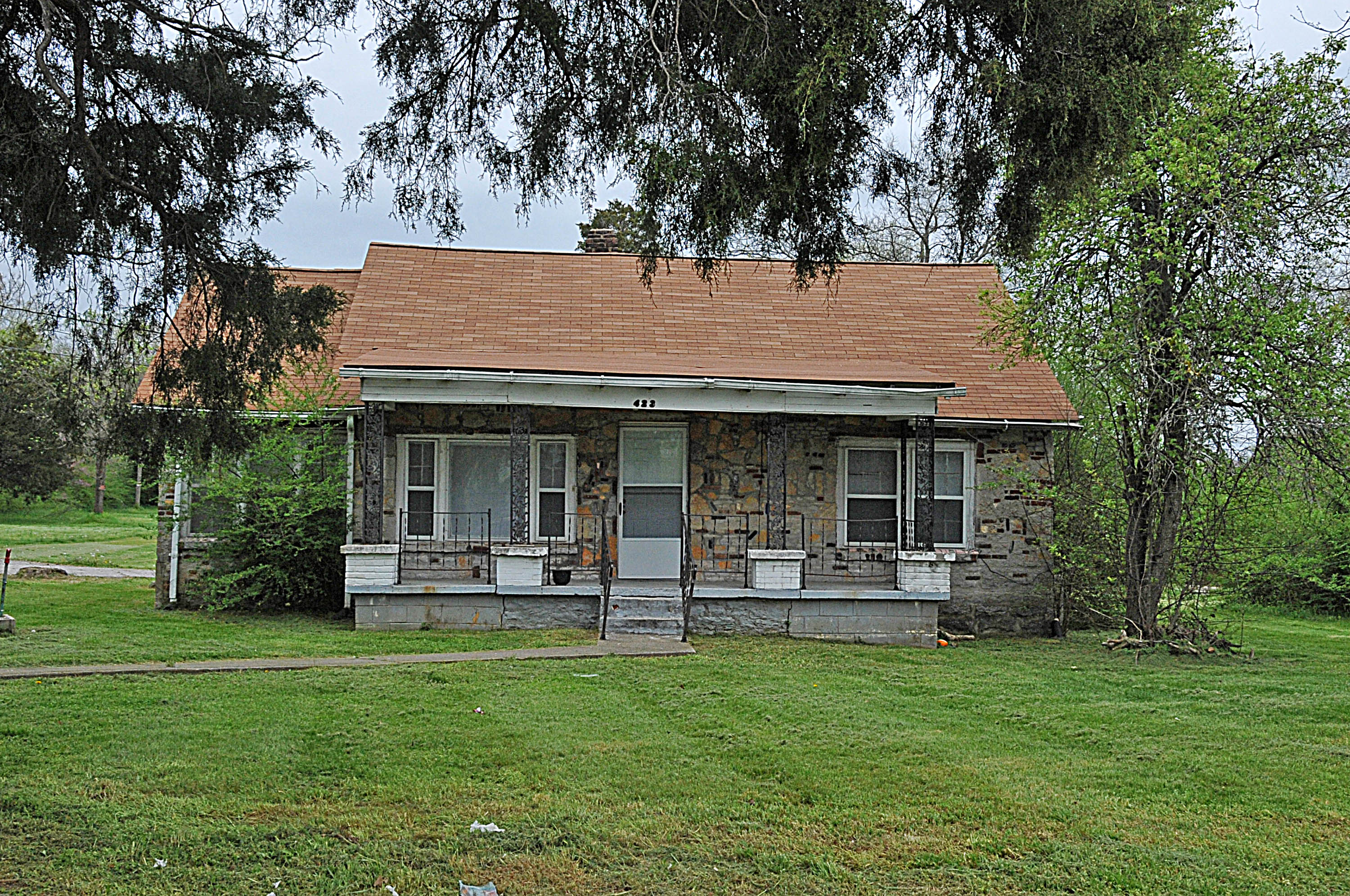
- Harry Bailey House in 2008

- Location within Tennessee
- Location: 423 Trousdale Ferry Rd., Lebanon, Tennessee
- Coordinates: 36°12′33″N 86°16′07″W
- Area: 3.2 acres (1.3 ha)
- Built: 1939
- Built by: Hale, Louis
- Architectural style: Bungalow/Craftsman
- NRHP reference No.: 00000230
- Added to NRHP: March 15, 2000

Harry Bailey House is situated in Wilson County, Tennessee, just to the east of Lebanon. The two bedroom 1000-square feet Bungalow style house was built around 1939.

The home was constructed with many different materials from the 1930 to the 1949 era. Most notable are over 300 glass bottles around the exterior of the house. The bottles are haphazardly placed and vary in size, shape and color. Coke bottles, Milk of Magnesia, Karo syrup and medicine bottles are but a few of the bottles making up the exterior of the house.

David O'Cunningham, who spent thirty years in the building material business, stated "I have seen many homes where collectable materials were incorporated into the exterior but never saw one using whole bottles." Harry Bailey, an African American World War II veteran, built the house with the assistance of Lewis Hale.

Most of the bottles used in construction of the house came from a tavern located on the property known as the "Jungle." Vehicle headlights shining on the bottles at night create a sparkle look. The house contain other features as well. The bottles are embedded in the stone, brick and mortar around the house. Ceramic tile can be seen around the window edges. Two wooden windows make up part of the exterior of the home. These windows are false and can not be seen from the inside of the house.

The house is an example of folk architecture and was added to the National Register of Historic Places on March 15, 2000.
