= Welling-Everly Horse Barn =

- U.S. National Register of Historic Places
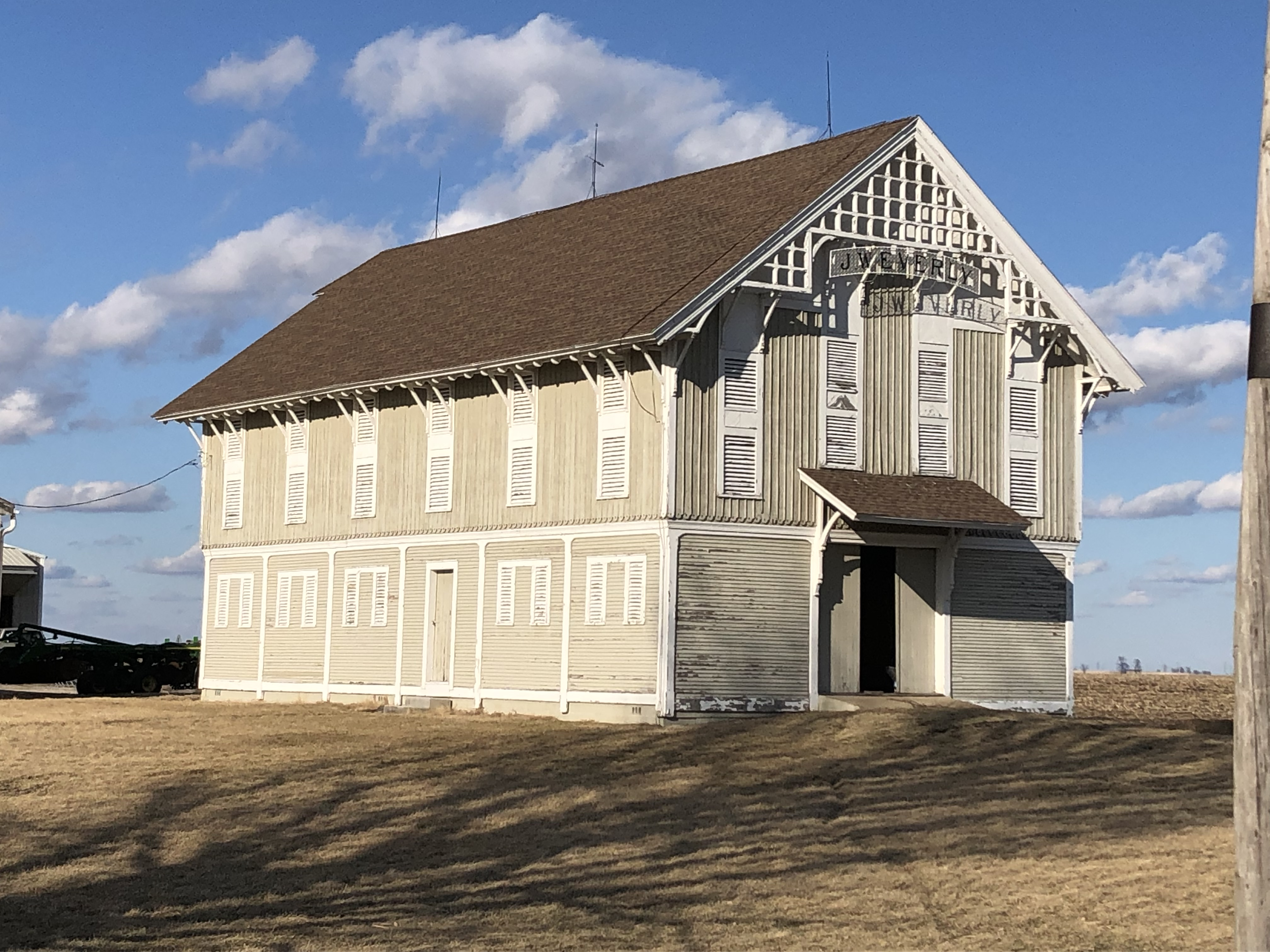

- Location within Illinois Location within the United States
- Nearest city: Adair, Illinois
- Coordinates: 40°26′0″N 90°32′5″W
- Area: less than one acre
- Built: 1882
- Architectural style: Stick Style
- NRHP reference No.: 85001911
- Added to NRHP: August 29, 1985

The Welling-Everly Horse Barn is a historic horse barn located west of U.S. Route 136 and northwest of Adair in rural McDonough County, Illinois. The barn was built in 1882 for Dave Welling, a wealthy livestock farmer. The Stick style barn was noted for its "artistic beauty" in Macomb's daily newspaper; its architecture is typical of the era's focus on building exquisite buildings in rural settings. While the barn was originally paired with an Eastlake style farmhouse, the house burned down in the 1890s and was replaced by a Queen Anne house that has since lost its architectural integrity. Welling sold his farm to Wm. H. Smith in 1892; in 1901, it was purchased by Jonas Everly, who began farming grain on the property.

The barn was added to the National Register of Historic Places on August 9, 1985.
