= Old Bailey (disambiguation) =

Old Bailey is the common name of the Central Criminal Court of England and Wales, as well as the name of the street on which it stands.

Old Bailey may also refer to:

- Old Bailey Street, in Hong Kong
- Old Bailey, a fictional character in the TV series Neverwhere
- Old Bailey, a fictional character in the TV series Thomas & Friends
- Old Bailey House, at the Bailey House Museum in Hawaiʻi
