= Weeks–Kimbrough House =

- U.S. National Register of Historic Places
- Location within Georgia
- Location: Washington Ave., Talbotton, Georgia
- Coordinates: 32°40′10″N 84°32′05″W
- Area: 3.8 acres (1.5 ha)
- Built: c.1845
- Built by: John Weeks
- Architectural style: Greek Revival
- NRHP reference No.: 79000747
- Added to NRHP: December 27, 1979

The Weeks–Kimbrough House, on Washington Ave. (U.S. 80/GA 41) in Talbotton, Georgia, was built around 1845. It was listed on the National Register of Historic Places in 1979.

It was a one-story Greek Revival house which was built with mortise, tenon and peg construction.

Its porch was supported by 12 fluted, simplified-Doric columns.

It was deemed "of architectural significance because it is the only remaining example of a style prominent in this area before the Civil War; it is significant in local history because its builder-owner, John Weeks, was an important merchant in this community. Before the Civil War, Talbot County was one of the largest and most important cotton-producing counties in Georgia. In 1860, 2.2 percent of the state's cotton was produced there. Of the 132 counties in Georgia at the time, only seven produced more cotton than Talbot County. The house is a rare example of the excellent proportions, craftsmanship and simplicity of this time." After the death of Week's wife Sarah, the house passed to their niece Sarah Holmes Leonard, who married T. A. Kimbrough in 1907.

A parcel map showing the oblong 3.80 acre lot upon which the house was located is included in the NRHP document. It appears that the house has been demolished or otherwise lost, however, because no building can be discerned in satellite view imagery of the site. And review of Talbot County tax assessor map information shows the same oblong 3.80 acre lot having no building upon it. It is Parcel ID 005 12255 L, which has no buildings or other improvements listed.
