= William Leonard Crowder Home Place =

- Crowder, William Leonard, Home Place
- U.S. National Register of Historic Places
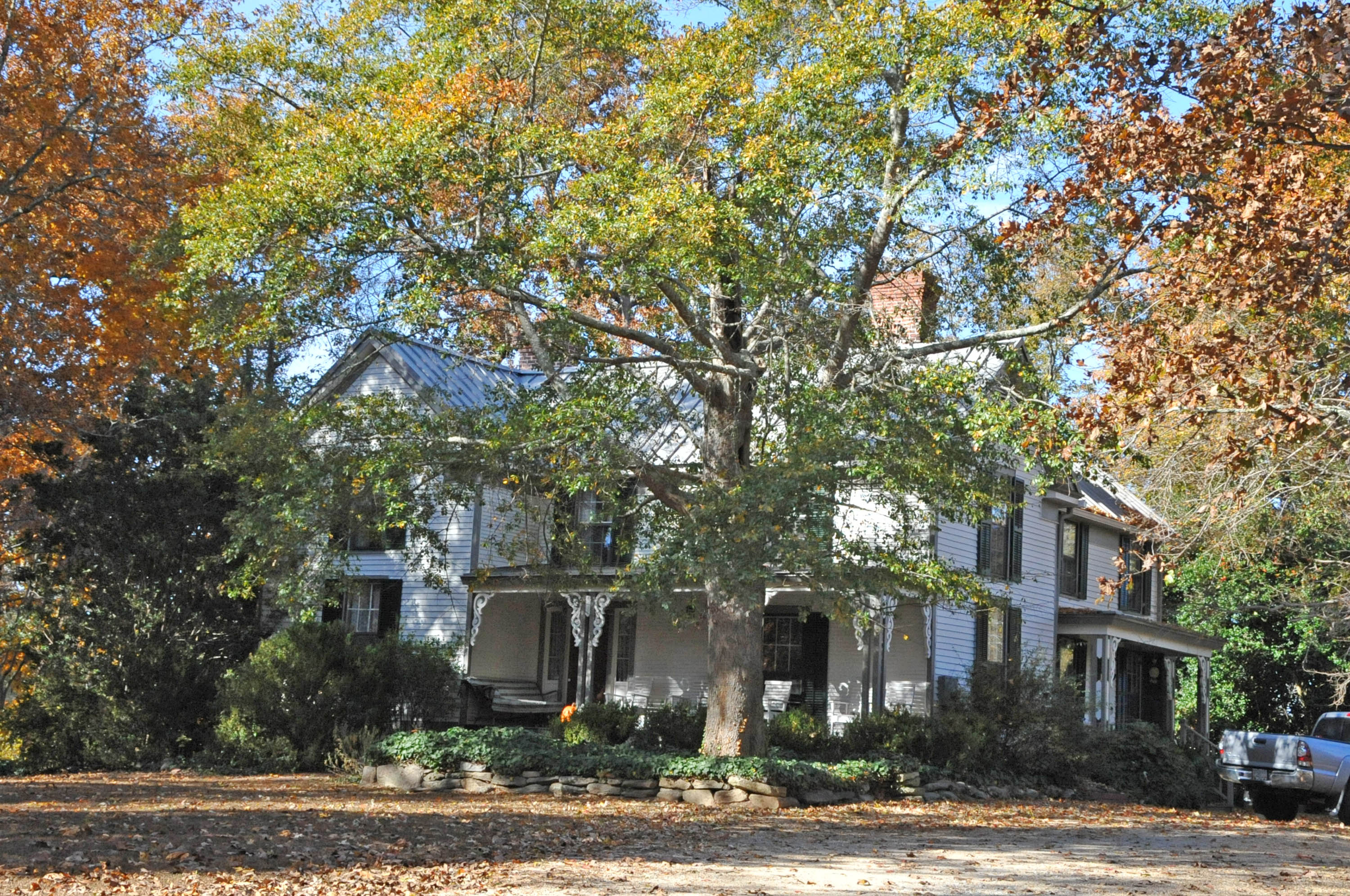

- Location within Georgia
- Nearest city: Newnan, Georgia
- Coordinates: 33°22′38″N 84°58′07″W
- Area: 44 acres (18 ha)
- Built: c. 1880
- Architectural style: Late Victorian
- NRHP reference No.: 86000455
- Added to NRHP: March 17, 1986

The William Leonard Crowder Home Place, at 1615 Handy Rd. in Coweta County, Georgia near Newnan, Georgia, was built in 1880. It was listed on the National Register of Historic Places in 1986. The listing included three contributing buildings and five contributing sites on 44 acres (18 ha).

It includes a two-story, L-shaped, wood-framed farmhouse built upon a granite foundation in the 1880s, expanded to the rear in 1948 and with side porches added in 1981. Its historic front porch has Victorian gingerbread detailing.
