= Goodwyn-Bailey House =

Historic house in Georgia, United States

- U.S. National Register of Historic Places
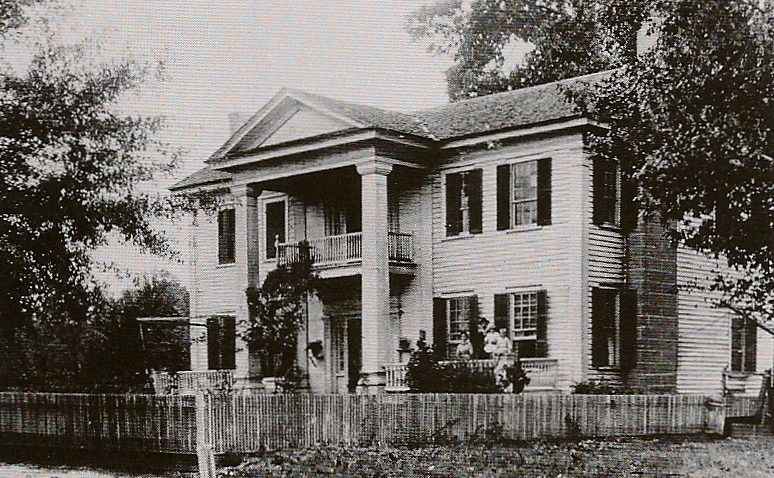

- Location within Georgia Location within the United States
- Location: 2295 Old Poplar Rd., Newnan, Georgia
- Coordinates: 33.35437°N 84.70532°W
- Area: 100 acres (40 ha)
- Built: 1835
- Architectural style: Greek Revival
- NRHP reference No.: 92001520
- Added to NRHP: October 29, 1992

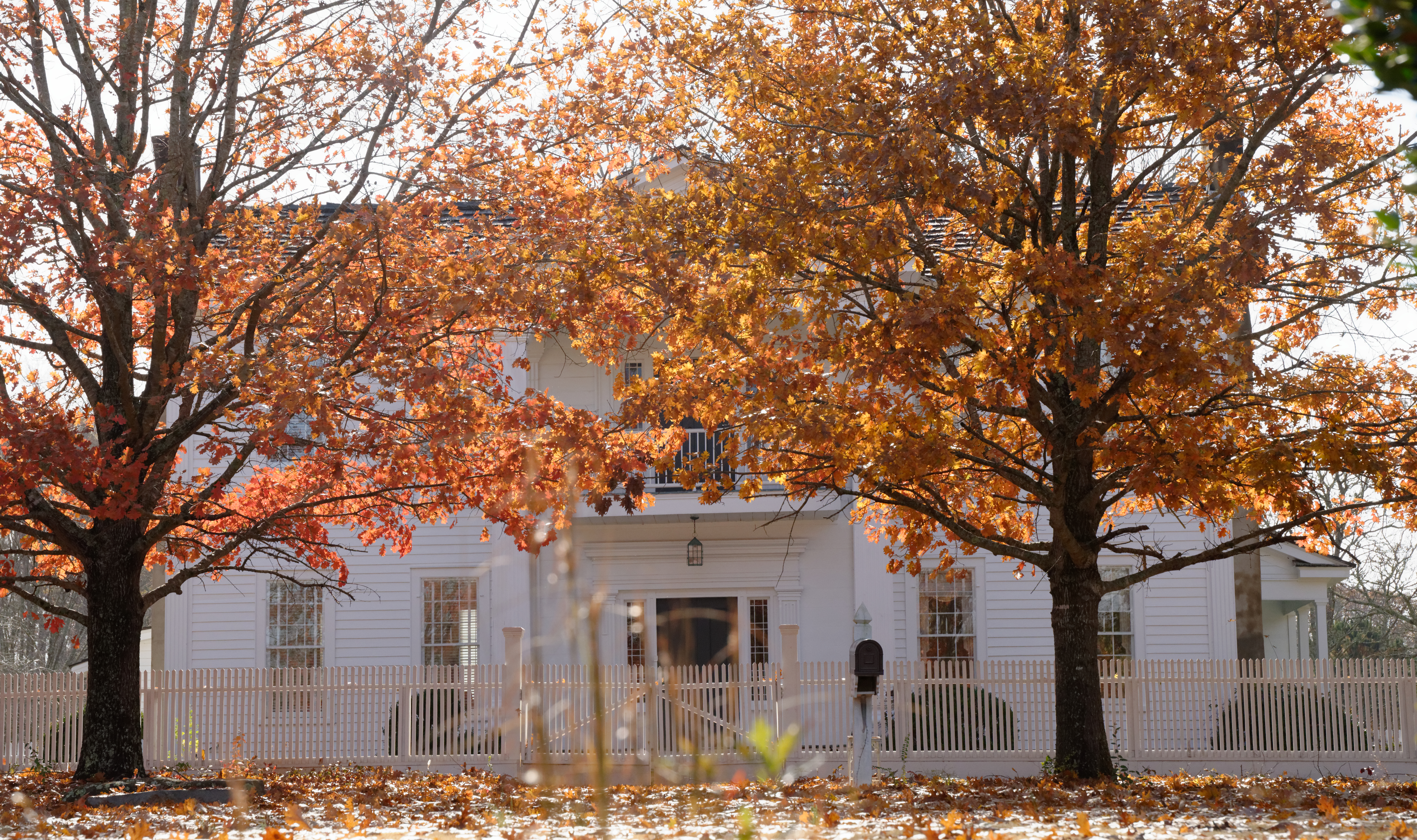
The house in 2019

The Goodwyn-Bailey House at 2295 Old Poplar Rd. in Newnan, Georgia, was built in 1835. Also known as Catalpa Plantation, it includes Greek Revival architecture. It was listed on the National Register of Historic Places in 1992. The listing included five contributing buildings and one contributing site on 100 acres (40 ha).

This home was the 1991 Winner of the Georgia Trust for Historic Preservation's Honor Award.

The Goodwyn homeplace is one of the few remaining examples of the antebellum plantation houses that were once numerous in Coweta County. Time, neglect, fire, and ill-directed remodeling have taken a heavy toll on Coweta's early homes.

The Goodwyn home was built by a Virginia family of substantial means. Many families from Virginia came to Coweta in the 1830s and 1840s and settled near each other in the eastern districts. The Goodwyns included Anne Dance Goodwyn, widow of Burwell Goodwyn of Brunswick County, Virginia, and her children, Thomas, Ann Eliza, Napoleon, Sarah, James, and Henry (and possibly others). The family settled in the Poplar Road area and remained there until after the turn of the century.

The administrator of Burwell Goodwyn's estate petitioned that Goodwyn "left real and personal property worth some considerable sum..." The quality of the home Thomas constructed after their arrival is testimony to the family's wealth. Few homes were built in Coweta in the 1840s (less than twenty years after the lottery opening the territory) of the size and detail found in the Goodwyn home. The homeplace remained in the family until 1900.

It continued to be a well-kept home, but was not well-preserved. Numerous architectural changes and some structural ones ere made to the house over the years. Finally an absentee owner assured that the property would fall into disrepair through thirty years of tenants and vandalism. As the house stood vacant in the mid-1980s, many felt that the property was beyond saving.

In 1986, the property was purchased by Rod Smith. Mr. Smith immediately began extensive research on the home and the family. The house retained its original mantels, panelled wainscot, double panelled doors, plaster, floors, fluted square Doric columns, chimneys, and basic floor plan.

An exhaustive study of the home revealed that numerous changes had been made to the original structure over the years. These included the removal of the old stairway rising from the rear of the stair hall, it being replaced by an early 20th century stair facing the front of the hallway. A full one-story front porch was added incorporating the original columns. Second floor rear windows were closed off and another upstairs room was added. The original cookhouse was removed and a new kitchen was added.

The Smiths began their restoration by removing the additions to the house as well as those portions of the home which had deteriorated beyond repair. As work progressed, the original location of moved doors, windows, and staircase became evident. In many areas, decorative trim had been moved intact or reused in other areas of the home.

Removal of the 20th century staircase exposed the original outline of the early stair. The Smiths have recreated the stair with old materials where possible, including a newel post from a demolished Coweta home of the same era.

The doorway to the west parlor was returned to its original position under the restored stair. Double French doors had been added to the east parlor, which were removed and the original door trim found in another part of the home (matching the room's window trim) was placed back in position.

The single panelled double doors from the front of the home were found on a closet in the house (having been replaced by a more "modern" doorway at some point) Matching doors were made by Herbert Gordy, Coweta's master carpenter (brother of D.X. Gordy, the renowned potter) for the rear of the stair hall.

Mr. Gordy reproduced the bases for the massive columns from an early photograph and all other detail work needed for the restoration. The full-width front porch was of concrete, removed by Mr. Smith with a jackhammer. The balcony was replaced using the early photograph as a guide.

Mr. Smith, his wife, and his father carefully repaired, replaced where needed, and skim-coated all of the plaster walls and ceilings in the home. The floor of the dining room was replaced with period flooring and the work on the dining room turned up evidence of the back staircase to the basement "summer kitchen" and to the second floor rear bedroom. This staircase was restored to its original configuration with meticulous attention given to blend new materials with old. The job is so skillfully done that there is no evidence that the stair had not remained untouched for a century and a half. The brick floor to the lower-level room and the missing mantel were replaced. Two windows which had been changed were replaced with copies of the one intact window in the room.

The "new" kitchen was removed and a wing added to the house to accommodate the Smith's kitchen and sitting room. Every effort was made to keep the flavor of the early home in the new construction and the result is a blend of a functional family area incorporated into the restoration.

The Smiths had acquired several outbuildings of the period and plan their restoration. The home has been opened to school children of the county as a part of the Heritage Education Program sponsored by the Coweta County School System.
