= Grantville, Georgia =

- City
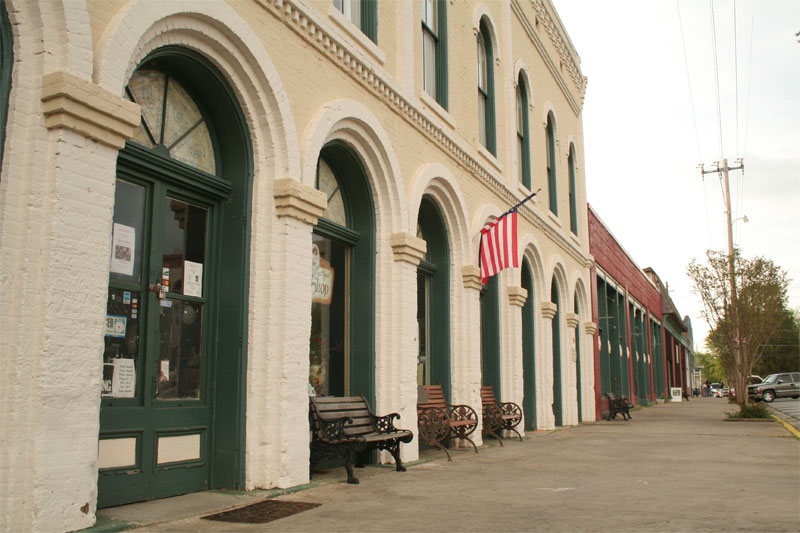
- Downtown Grantville

- Flag Seal
- Motto: Come Grow with Us
- Location in Coweta County and the state of Georgia
- Coordinates: 33°14′14″N 84°49′37″W
- Country: United States
- State: Georgia
- County: Coweta

Area
  - Total: 5.81 sq mi (15.05 km^{2})
  - Land: 5.80 sq mi (15.01 km^{2})
  - Water: 0.019 sq mi (0.05 km^{2})
- Elevation: 869 ft (265 m)

Population (2020)
  - Total: 3,103
  - Density: 536/sq mi (206.8/km^{2})
- Time zone: UTC-5 (Eastern (EST))
  - Summer (DST): UTC-4 (EDT)
- ZIP code: 30220
- Area code: 770
- FIPS code: 13-34428
- GNIS feature ID: 0356079
- Website: grantvillega.org

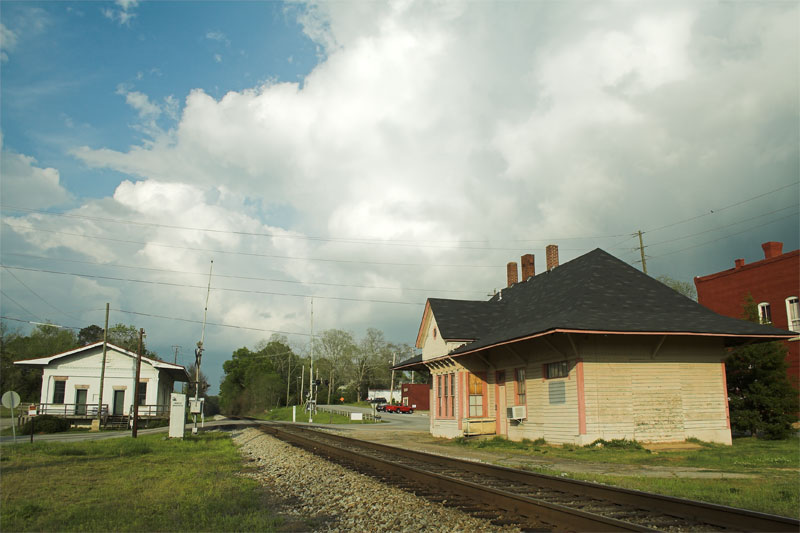
Grantville Depot

Grantville is a city in Coweta County, Georgia, United States. The 2020 census shows a population of 3,103.

== Geography ==
Grantville is located along the southern border of Coweta County. U.S. Route 29 runs through the city, passing south of the center, while Interstate 85 passes through the eastern part of the city, crossing US 29 at Exit 35. I-85 leads northeast 46 miles (74 km) to Atlanta and southwest 114 miles (183 km) to Montgomery, Alabama, while US 29, a more local road, leads north 12 miles (19 km) to Newnan, the Coweta County seat, and southwest 20 miles (32 km) to LaGrange.

According to the United States Census Bureau, Grantville has a total area of 5.6 square miles (14.5 km^{2}), of which 0.02 square miles (0.05 km^{2}), or 0.31%, is water.

== Demographics ==
Historical population
Census	Pop.	Note	%±
1880	618		—
1890	654		5.8%
1900	769		17.6%
1910	1,132		47.2%
1920	1,200		6.0%
1930	1,346		12.2%
1940	1,267		−5.9%
1950	1,359		7.3%
1960	1,158		−14.8%
1970	1,128		−2.6%
1980	1,110		−1.6%
1990	1,180		6.3%
2000	1,309		10.9%
2010	3,041		132.3%
2020	3,103		2.0%
2025 (est.)	3,284	▲	5.8%
U.S. Decennial Census

=== 2020 census ===
As of the 2020 census, Grantville had a population of 3,103. The median age was 32.0 years. 29.4% of residents were under the age of 18 and 9.7% of residents were 65 years of age or older. For every 100 females there were 94.4 males, and for every 100 females age 18 and over there were 89.1 males age 18 and over.

0.0% of residents lived in urban areas, while 100.0% lived in rural areas.

There were 1,101 households in Grantville and 841 families residing in the city. Of all households, 46.6% were married-couple households, 16.0% were households with a male householder and no spouse or partner present, and 29.4% were households with a female householder and no spouse or partner present. About 20.7% of all households were made up of individuals, and 8.2% had someone living alone who was 65 years of age or older.

There were 1,200 housing units, of which 8.2% were vacant. The homeowner vacancy rate was 2.7% and the rental vacancy rate was 7.2%.

Grantville racial composition as of 2020
Race	Num.	Perc.
White (non-Hispanic)	2,028	65.36%
Black or African American (non-Hispanic)	774	24.94%
Native American	6	0.19%
Asian	21	0.68%
Other/Mixed	157	5.06%
Hispanic or Latino	117	3.77%

== In film and television ==
A number of episodes of the AMC series The Walking Dead were shot in the town. Since the shooting of the series tourism to the town has increased greatly, making it an important industry to the town. Grantville was chosen as a location in The Walking Dead because of the number of faded and dilapidated buildings that give parts of the town a "post-apocalyptic" feeling, a result of the decline in the cotton industry in the area.

The movies Lawless and Broken Bridges were also shot in Grantville, as were Captain America: Brave New World and The Bondsman.
