= Frederick A. Bailey House =

- U.S. National Register of Historic Places
- Location within Georgia
- Location: U.S. 80, Talbotton, Georgia
- Coordinates: 32°39′26″N 84°32′06″W
- Area: 4.3 acres (1.7 ha)
- Built: 1837
- Architectural style: Greek Revival
- NRHP reference No.: 80001238
- Added to NRHP: September 4, 1980

The Frederick A. Bailey House, located on U.S. Route 80 in Talbotton, Georgia, was built in 1837. It was listed on the National Register of Historic Places in 1980.

It is a two-story weatherboard house built upon a brick pier foundation infilled with lattice slats.
