= Senoia, Georgia =

City in the United States

- City
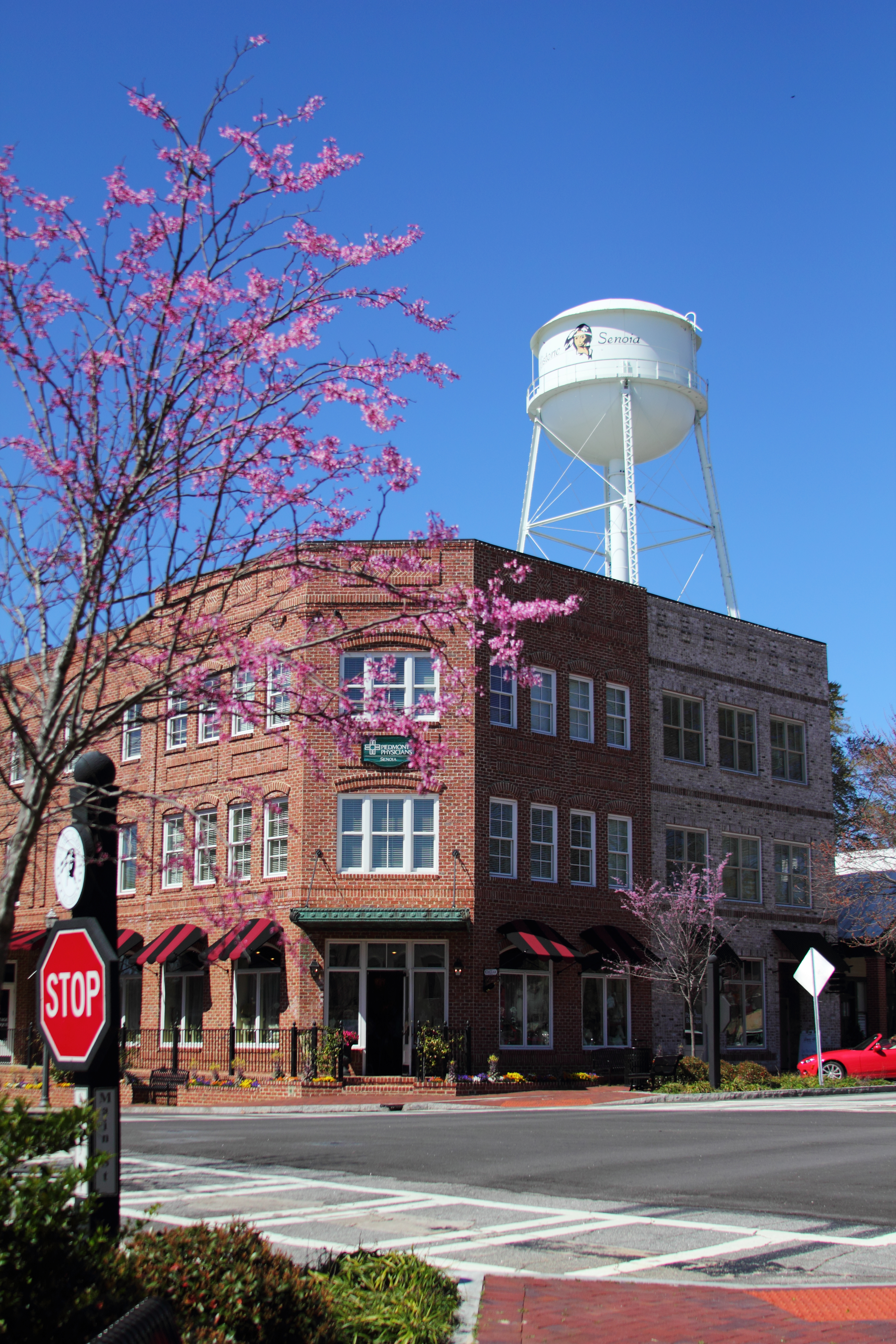
- Downtown Senoia

- Logo
- Nickname: Woodbury [TWD]
- Motto: "The perfect setting. For life."
- Location in Coweta County and the state of Georgia
- Coordinates: 33°18′7″N 84°33′12″W
- Country: United States
- State: Georgia
- County: Coweta

Government

Area
  - Total: 6.30 sq mi (16.32 km^{2})
  - Land: 6.16 sq mi (15.96 km^{2})
  - Water: 0.14 sq mi (0.36 km^{2})
- Elevation: 889 ft (271 m)

Population (2020)
  - Total: 5,016
  - Density: 814.1/sq mi (314.34/km^{2})
- Time zone: UTC-5 (Eastern (EST))
  - Summer (DST): UTC-4 (EDT)
- ZIP code: 30276
- Area code: 678
- FIPS code: 13-69672
- GNIS feature ID: 0322710
- Website: senoia.com

Senoia (/səˈnɔɪə/, locally /səˈnɔɪ/) is a city located south of Atlanta in Coweta County, Georgia, United States. It is part of the Atlanta metropolitan area. Its population was 5,016 at the 2020 census.

== History ==
The first permanent settlement in the area was made in 1860 by Rev. Francis Warren Baggarly. In 1864, around the time residents of the nearby Willow Dell community began to arrive, the settlement was named Senoia. A number of the area's first structures appeared this year, such as a mercantile building known as the Rock House and a Methodist Episcopal church led by Baggarly. A high school would open in 1865. Senoia was officially incorporated as a city on December 12, 1866.

== Geography ==
Senoia is located in southeastern Coweta County at 33°18′7″N 84°33′12″W (33.301849, -84.553450). It is bordered to the north by Peachtree City in Fayette County.

According to the United States Census Bureau, Senoia has a total area of 5.4 square miles (14.1 km^{2}), of which 5.4 square miles (13.9 km^{2}) is land and 0.12 square miles (0.3 km^{2}), or 2.03%, is water.

== Demographics ==
Historical population
Census	Pop.	Note	%±
1880	731		—
1890	863		18.1%
1900	782		−9.4%
1910	1,111		42.1%
1920	906		−18.5%
1930	736		−18.8%
1940	679		−7.7%
1950	770		13.4%
1960	782		1.6%
1970	910		16.4%
1980	900		−1.1%
1990	956		6.2%
2000	1,738		81.8%
2010	3,307		90.3%
2020	5,016		51.7%
2025 (est.)	6,276	▲	25.1%
U.S. Decennial Census

=== 2020 census ===
As of the 2020 census, Senoia had a population of 5,016. The median age was 39.0 years. 25.0% of residents were under the age of 18 and 13.5% of residents were 65 years of age or older. For every 100 females there were 93.6 males, and for every 100 females age 18 and over there were 94.3 males age 18 and over.

0.0% of residents lived in urban areas, while 100.0% lived in rural areas.

There were 1,709 households in Senoia, of which 41.6% had children under the age of 18 living in them. Of all households, 67.9% were married-couple households, 9.5% were households with a male householder and no spouse or partner present, and 18.9% were households with a female householder and no spouse or partner present. About 15.6% of all households were made up of individuals and 6.7% had someone living alone who was 65 years of age or older. There were 1,169 families residing in the city.

There were 1,812 housing units, of which 5.7% were vacant. The homeowner vacancy rate was 2.8% and the rental vacancy rate was 4.6%.

Senoia racial composition as of 2020
Race	Num.	Perc.
White (non-Hispanic)	3,922	78.19%
Black or African American (non-Hispanic)	506	10.09%
Native American	7	0.14%
Asian	88	1.75%
Other/mixed	202	4.03%
Hispanic or Latino	291	5.8%

== In the media ==
=== Film and television ===
Riverwood Studios is located in Senoia. Movies including Fried Green Tomatoes, Driving Miss Daisy and the 2011 remake of Footloose were partly filmed in the town.

Following its first season, principal production of The Walking Dead has been filmed in Riverwood Studios (doing business as Raleigh Studios Atlanta), a plot of land about 140 acres (0.57 km^{2}) outside of Senoia. Downtown Senoia itself served as the set for a fictionalized version of the community of Woodbury during the third season of the show. Fans of the show have flocked to try to catch shooting, a development that has met with a negative reception from some town residents, while others have found the added tourists helpful for business growth.

=== In print ===
Senoia has been chosen twice to host the Southern Living Idea House, in 2010 and 2012. The Idea Houses are designer showcases of the finest trends in home design and furnishings.

- In 2010 a four-story 4,880-square-foot (453 m^{2}) luxury brownstone that is part of the Historic Senoia Project was decorated by noted local designer and decorator Jamie McPherson.
- The 2012 Idea House is a renovated 1830s farmhouse located in Senoia's Gin Property neighborhood. The house was raised, moved a bit closer to the street, peeled back to its original materials, gutted, reconfigured, added on to, and redecorated. This was the first time that an Idea House was not a new building. Instead, the 2012 project was a restoration and enlargement of a historic home. The home is now a private residence.

== Notable people ==
- Cam Bedrosian, pitcher for Philadelphia Phillies; born in Senoia
- Steve Bedrosian, retired pitcher for the Atlanta Braves (father of Cam Bedrosian)
- Michael Bobinski, athletic director at Purdue University; lives in Senoia
- Keith Brooking, linebacker for the Atlanta Falcons, Dallas Cowboys, and Denver Broncos; born in Senoia
- Bubba Pollard, ARCA Menards Series East, late model driver, construction worker
- Rutledge Wood, host of Top Gear US; lives in Senoia
