= Raymond, Georgia =

Unincorporated community in Georgia, U.S.

Coordinates: 33°20′19″N 84°42′53″W

Raymond is an unincorporated community in Coweta County, in the U.S. state of Georgia.

== History ==
A post office called Raymond was established in 1907, and remained in operation until 1980. The community was named after Mary Ray, the mother of its founder.
