= William S. Bailey House =

Historic house in Illinois, United States

- U.S. National Register of Historic Places
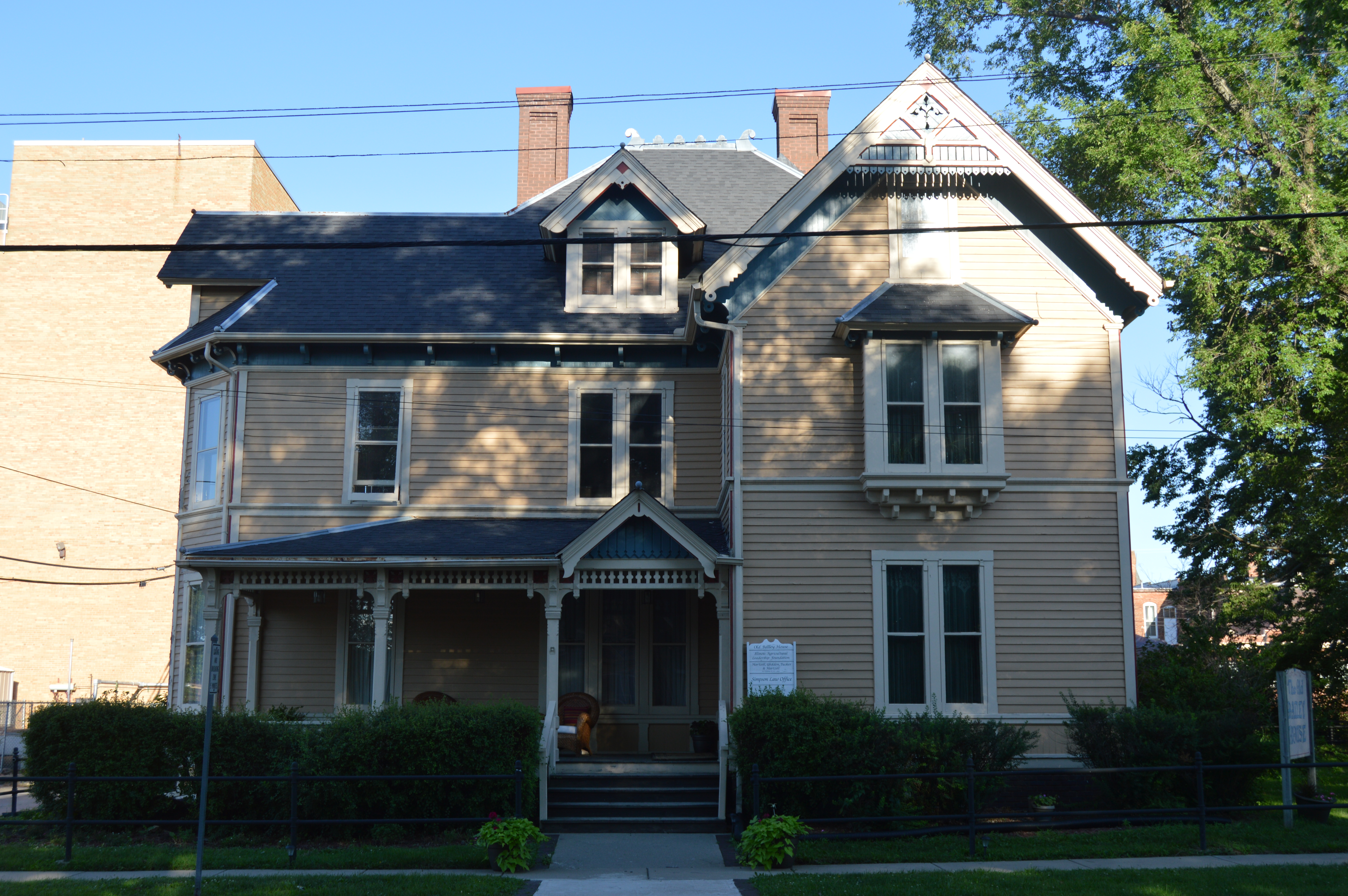

- Location within Illinois Location within the United States
- Location: 100 S. Campbell St., Macomb, Illinois
- Coordinates: 40°27′29″N 90°40′8″W
- Built: 1887
- Architectural style: Queen Anne, Eastlake
- NRHP reference No.: 12000553
- Added to NRHP: August 28, 2012

The William S. Bailey House is a historic house located at 100 South Campbell Street in Macomb, Illinois. The house was built in 1887 for William S. Bailey, a prominent local businessman who built several of the buildings on Macomb's town square. The house has a Queen Anne style design with Eastlake details; it is one of the best-preserved Queen Anne homes in Macomb. The 2 1/2-story house has a hipped roof with cross gables; the gable ends are decorated with spindlework cresting. Three brick chimneys with patterned masonry provide ventilation for the house's fireplaces and kitchen stove. The front porch features a spindlework railing and decorative trim along the roof and the entry pediment.

The house was added to the National Register of Historic Places on August 28, 2012.
