= Blount Street Historic District =

Neighborhood in Raleigh, North Carolina

Coordinates: 35.787°N 78.636°W

Blount Street Historic District North Blount Street Historic District
- Raleigh neighborhood
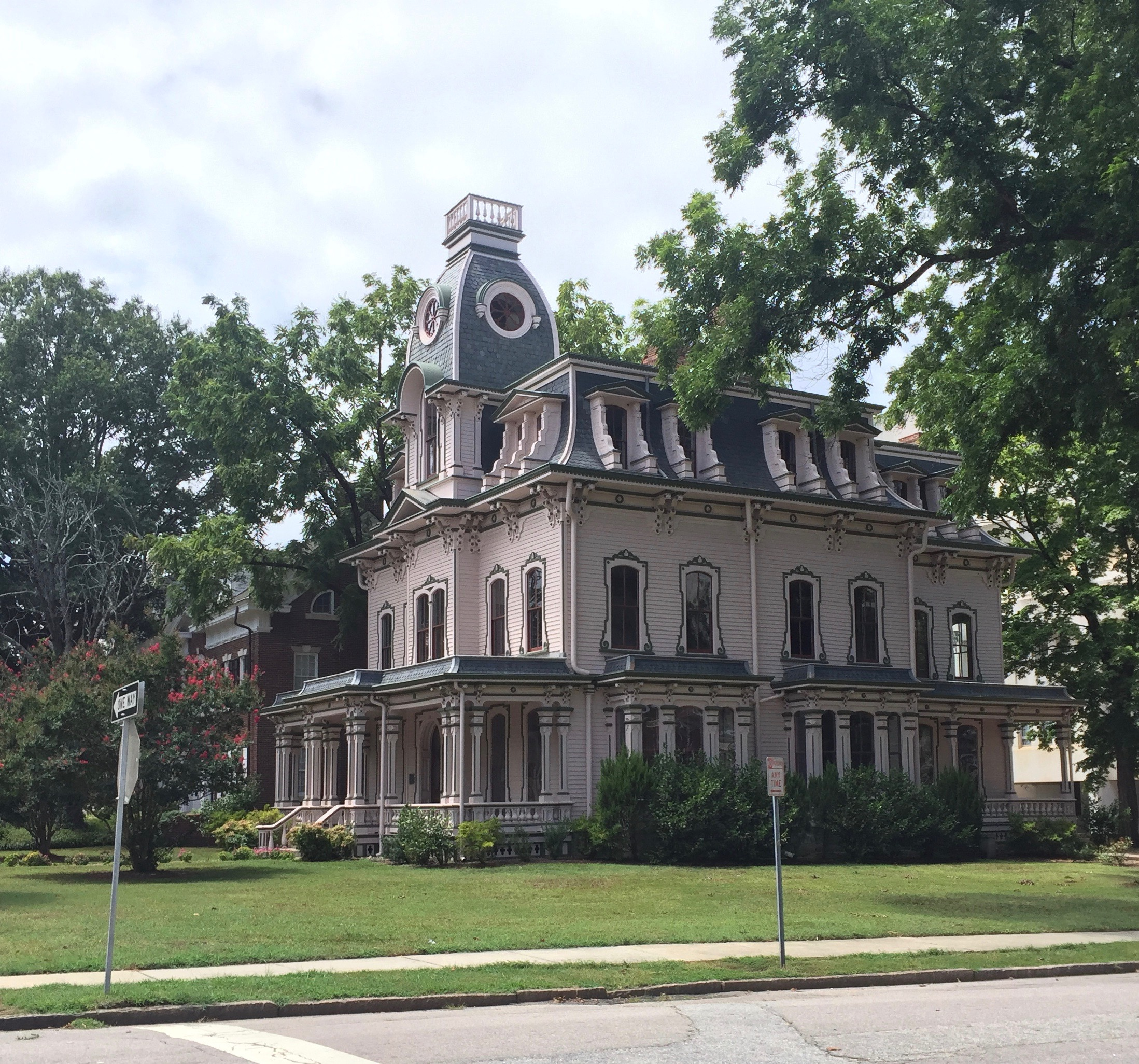
- The Heck-Andrews House on North Blount Street
- Interactive map of Blount Street Historic District
- Country: United States
- State: North Carolina
- City: Raleigh
- Named for: Thomas Blount
- Time zone: EST
- Area code: 27601

The Blount Street Historic District, also called North Blount Street Historic District and Blount Street Historic Overlay District, is a neighborhood in Raleigh, North Carolina. While the neighborhood is not listed on the National Register of Historic Places, the National Park Service certified that Blount Street Historic District meets the requirements of a historic district. The North Carolina Executive Mansion and the North Carolina Lieutenant Governor's Mansion are located within the neighborhood.

== History ==
Blount Street was developed between 1870 and 1920, near Historic Oakwood, in what is now downtown Raleigh. It became one of the most fashionable neighborhoods for Raleigh's wealthy white residence between the Civil War and World War I, namely local industrialists, railroad executives, politicians, planters, and former Confederate officers. Prior to the Civil War, the area included several large Antebellum villas, such as the Greek Revival mansion known as the Lewis-Smith House (built in 1855) at 515 North Blount Street. William Peace University, then a girls school known as Peace Institute, was built here in 1858. Many large, ornate mansions were constructed here following the war in the Queen Anne, Italianate, and Second Empire styles that rose in popularity during the Victorian period. These homes include Gilded Age mansions like the Heck-Andrews House (built in 1870) at 310 North Blount Street, and the Merrimon-Wynne House (built 1875) at 500 North Blount Street, and the Hawkins-Hartness House (built in 1882) at 310 North Blount Street. The North Carolina Executive Mansion, the official residence of the Governor of North Carolina, was built in the neighborhood in 1891.

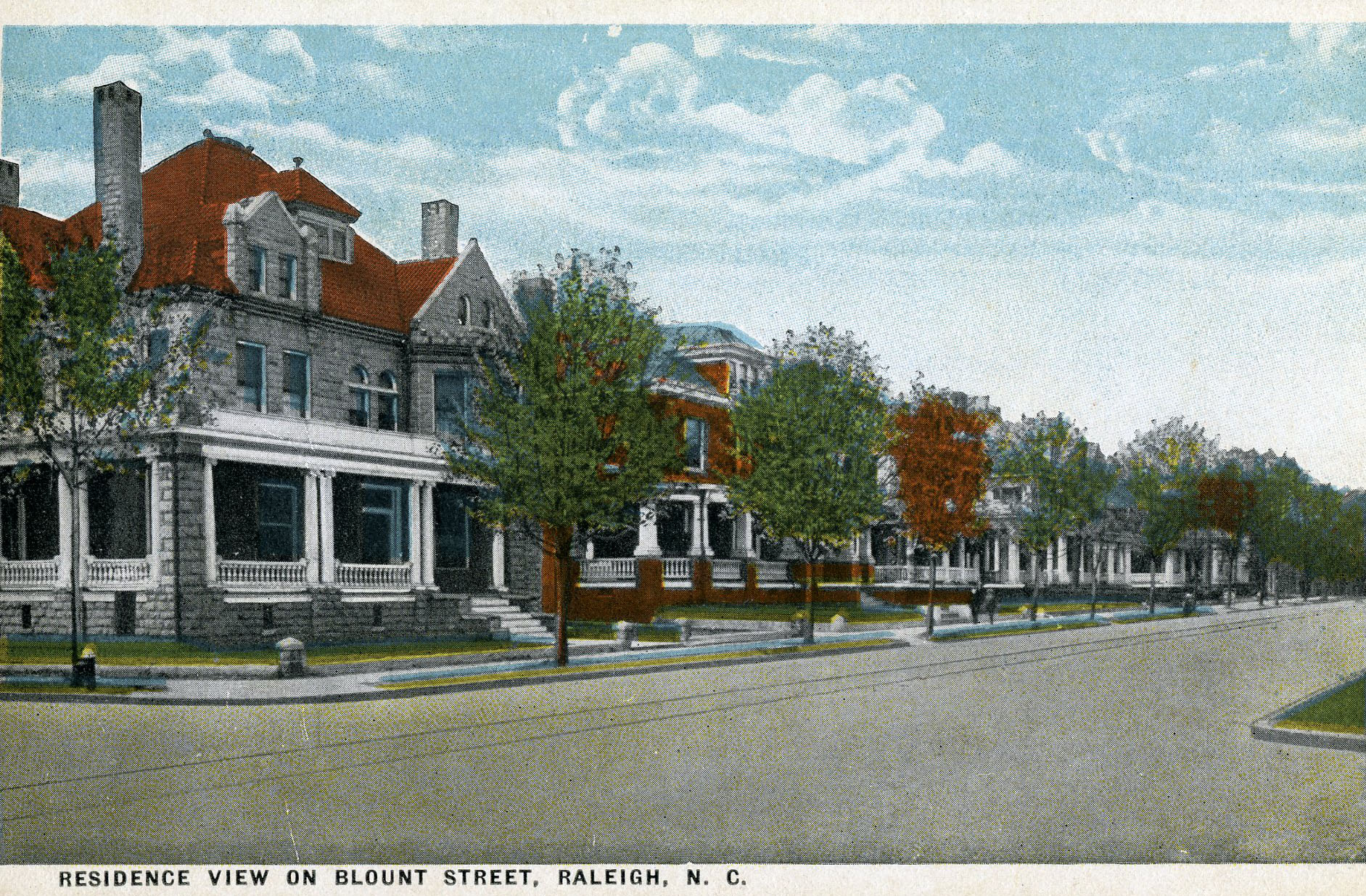
Houses along the 200 block of North Blount Street in 1910.

With the development of other suburban developments like Hayes Barton, Cameron Park, and Boylan Heights, the expansion of Blount Street neighborhood diminished. In late 1960s, the State Property Office began purchasing houses and converting them into state offices, including the Hawkins-Hartness House which became the official office of the Lieutenant Governor of North Carolina, and the Norris-Heartt House, which became the offices of the North Carolina State Bureau of Investigation and the North Carolina State Office of Archaeology. Eventually, government offices were moved out into newer buildings, with the exception of the Lieutenant Governor's office, and the neighborhood became residential again.

While some of the buildings within the district are individually listed on the National Register of Historic Places, Blount Street is not listed. The National Park Service certified that Blount Street Historic District meets the National Register requirements of a historic district for the purpose of receiving tax credits for historic preservation and rehabilitation programs.

== Notable buildings ==
- Andrews-Duncan House, former home of Alexander Boyd Andrews
- Bailey-Bunn House, state headquarters for the United Daughters of the Confederacy
- Bailey-Tucker House, former official state guest house
- Capehart House, former home of Lucy Catherine Capehart
- Garland Scott and Toler Moore Tucker House (formerly in the district, was later moved to Oakwood)
- Hawkins-Hartness House, official office of the lieutenant governor
- Heck-Andrews House, former home of Mrs. Mattie Heck
- Holy Trinity Anglican Church, parish of the Anglican Church in North America
- Lewis-Smith House, antebellum mansion
- Leonidas L. Polk House, former home of Leonidas L. Polk
- Merrimon-Wynne House, former home of Augustus Summerfield Merrimon
- Norris-Heartt House, former home of Cornelia Alice Norris
- North Carolina Executive Mansion, official residence of the governor
- Peace College Main Building, college multi-purpose building
