= Governor Caldwell =

Governor Cadwell may refer to:

- Millard Caldwell (1897–1984), 29th Governor of Florida
- Tod Robinson Caldwell (1818–1874), 41st Governor of North Carolina
- William Bletterman Caldwell, Governor of the Red River Colony from 1848 to 1855
