= Hawkins-Hartness House =

Historic house in North Carolina, United States

- U.S. National Register of Historic Places
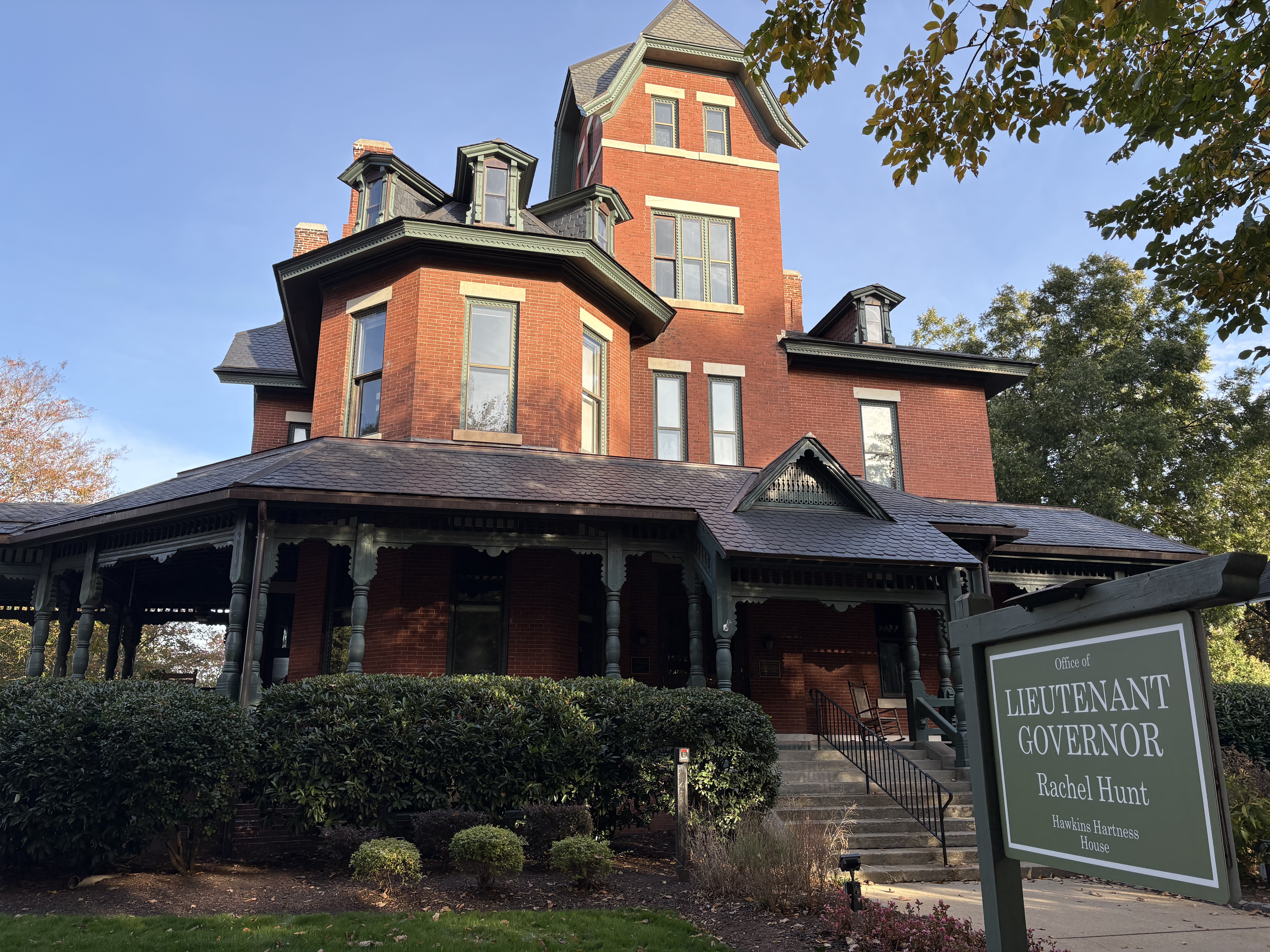
- The house in 2025

- Location within North Carolina Location within the United States
- Location: 310 N. Blount St., Raleigh, North Carolina
- Coordinates: 35°48′19″N 78°36′57″W
- Area: 0.5 acres (0.20 ha)
- Built: c. 1880
- Architectural style: Eastlake
- NRHP reference No.: 72000999
- Added to NRHP: February 1, 1972

Hawkins-Hartness House, also known as the Lieutenant Governor's Mansion, is a historic Eastlake style house in Raleigh, North Carolina. Built circa 1880, the former private residence has served as the office of the Lieutenant Governor of North Carolina since 1988. It is located within the Blount Street Historic District. The house was listed on the National Register of Historic Places in 1972.

== History ==
The original house on the property was owned by Mary W. Bryan. The house was later torn down to build the current house. The Hawkins-Hartness House was built around 1880 for Dr. Alexander B. Hawkins and his wife. It is a 2 1/2-story, Eastlake-style brick dwelling with a four-story tower and numerous two-story projections. It features a one-story hip-roof Eastlake movement style front porch. In 1922, Mrs. Hawkins had a second house, the Bailey-Bunn House, built in the side yard for her niece, Martha Hawkins Bailey. The house was sold to Sadie L. Erwin, the wife of philanthropist and manufacturer William A. Erwin, in 1922. They never lived in the home and sold it in May 1928 to Annie Sloan Hartness, the wife of North Carolina Secretary of State James A. Hartness.

It was listed on the National Register of Historic Places in 1972.

=== Office of the lieutenant governor ===
The house was purchased by the state government in 1969. The house was converted from a private residence to a state office building, housing the North Carolina Department of Local Affairs and the North Carolina Department of Historical Preservation. In 1988, it became the official office of the Lieutenant Governor of North Carolina during Robert B. Jordan's term.

During his term as lieutenant governor from 2013 to 2021, Dan Forest raised hundreds of thousands of dollars in private donations to renovate and refurnish the house. Forest opened the house to the public on Christmas and on Henry Clay Day.

Some items were notably removed from the house during the transition from Lieutenant Governor Mark Robinson to Lieutenant Governor Rachel Hunt. When Hunt's administration moved into the house, they found many of the rooms empty, including the lieutenant governor's executive office. Several state agencies began a low-profile effort to replace desks, chairs, tables, and lamps that were taken from the house. Hunt's staff filed a budget from the North Carolina Office of State Budget and Management requesting $97,300 for new furnishings and carpeting. She also requested $115,000 to improve security for the house. Hunt expressed a desire to reopen the house for events and tours to the public.

== See also ==
- North Carolina Executive Mansion, official residence of the governor of North Carolina
- North Carolina Governor's Western Residence, official western residence of the governor of North Carolina
- Bailey-Tucker House, former official guest house of the governor of North Carolina
