= Peace College Main Building =

Historic building in Raleigh, North Carolina, US

- U.S. National Register of Historic Places
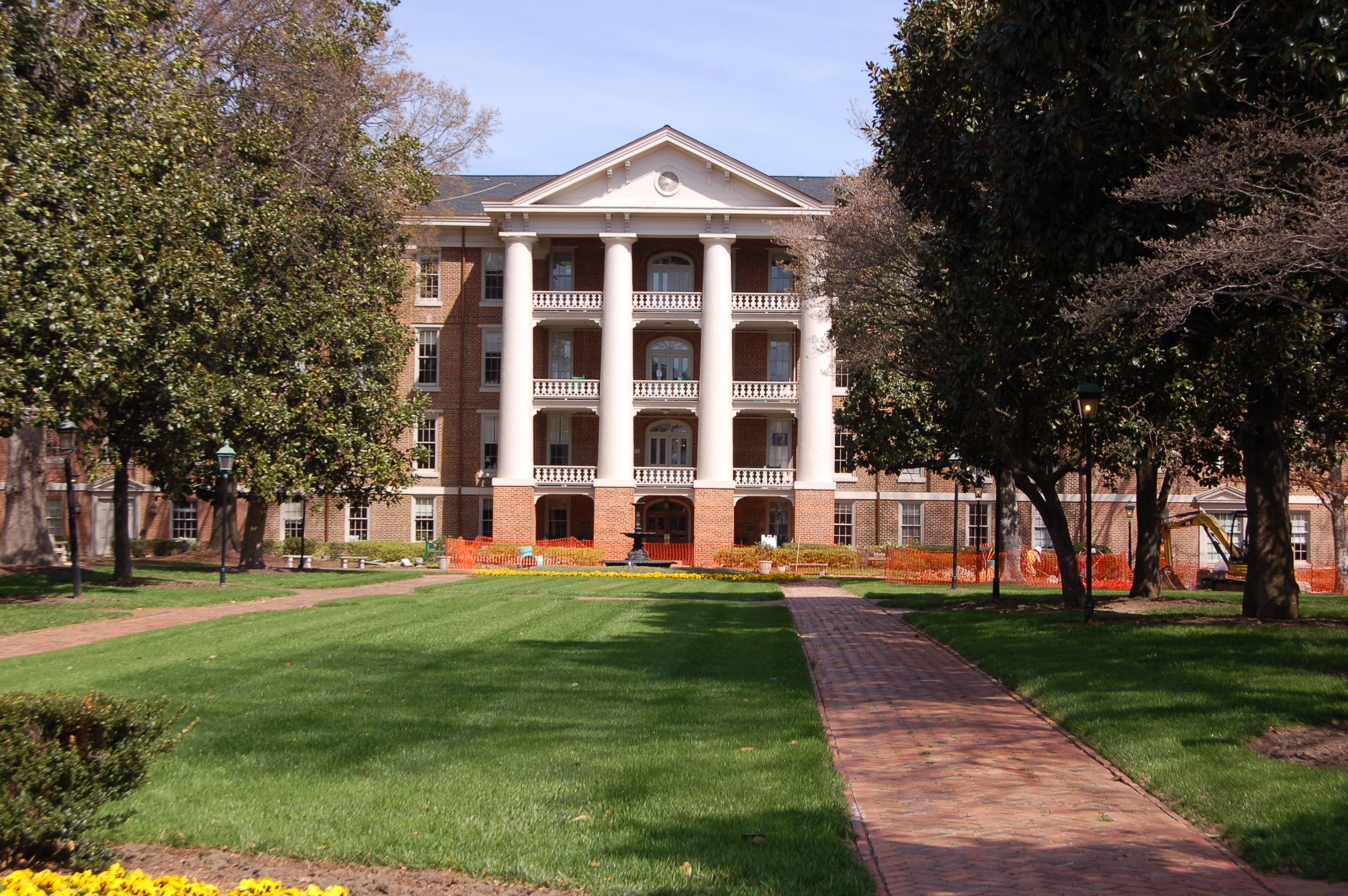

- Location within North Carolina Location within the United States
- Location: Peace St. and N end of Wilmington St., Raleigh, North Carolina
- Coordinates: 35.7891°N 78.6377°W
- Area: 8 acres (3.2 ha)
- Built: 1859
- Architectural style: Greek Revival
- NRHP reference No.: 73001377
- Added to NRHP: June 19, 1973

Peace College Main Building is the focal point of the Peace College campus in Raleigh, North Carolina. Built between 1859 and 1862, Main Building is located at the northern end of Wilmington Street in downtown Raleigh's Blount Street Historic District and is considered one of the largest antebellum buildings surviving in the city. During its early history, Main Building was used as a military hospital and offices for the Freedmen's Bureau. The building now contains offices, parlors, banquet rooms, and dormitory residences. Main Building was listed on the National Register of Historic Places in 1973 and is a designated Raleigh Historic Landmark.

== History ==
Before the Civil War, women in North Carolina were not allowed to receive higher education at a majority of colleges. The only exceptions were Salem College, Louisburg College, Greensboro College, the Chowan Baptist Female Institute (now Chowan University) and New Garden, an institution operated by Quakers. In 1847, Presbyterians in Raleigh passed a church resolution to provide an educational institution specifically for women. The resolution stated, "Be it resolved that the Reverend William N. Mebane and Elder Alfred M. Scales respectfully bring to the notice of the Orange Presbytery meeting in Raleigh the importance of establishing a female institution of learning to be under the direction of Orange Presbytery."

William Peace, one of the founders of the University of North Carolina, was an elder in the First Presbyterian Church of Raleigh. Peace donated land and $10,000 (one-third of the total cost of Main Building) for the construction of the new school. Peace Institute of Raleigh was incorporated on October 1, 1858.

Construction of the building began in 1859, but when North Carolina seceded from the Union in 1861, the building was still incomplete. Thomas Hill, a surgeon for the Confederate States of America, was sent to Raleigh to open a hospital for wounded Confederate soldiers. Hill wrote:

"It was at first proposed to take the St. Mary's School with buildings, but on consultation with friends this idea was abandoned; and it was pointed out that the Peace Institute, then in an incompleted condition, could be had-and would be more suitable and cause less dissatisfaction. I visited the place and found a large brick framework,-the roof on,-but no floors and windows,-, General Holmes' orders were to hurry up matters and, if necessary, to impress every able-bodied man in Raleigh and put .him to work-and get the building ready. Major Pierce called in the contractor, Mr. Briggs, and he promised to put hands enough to work to get the Hospital ready in a month. ... In the meantime ... the floors were put down and frames made for the windows – no glass could be found – so the frames were covered with white domestic and painted to keep out the cold. ... As well as I can recollect ... the first patients were received on the 6th of June, 1862."

Main Building in 1920

After the Civil War ended in 1865, Main Building was used as the district headquarters of the Freedman's Bureau Agency. The Bureau was responsible for providing relief and education to refugees and former slaves during the Reconstruction period. In 1869 the Bureau moved to another location, and Main Building went through an extensive renovation.

Because of the economic hardships experienced by many Southerners after the War, the trustees of Peace Institute were unable to repay the loans for the building project. A local businessman, R. S. Pullen, assisted with repaying these loans. A joint-stock company led by local Presbyterians funded the curriculum of "three courses of instruction: Primary, Preparatory and Collegiate." With this funding, classes officially began at Main Building in 1872.

In 1914, Peace became the first accredited junior college in the South, and eventually the primary and preparatory programs were discontinued at Main Building. The East Wing of the building was constructed in 1928. In 1995, Peace's curriculum was changed to baccalaureate status.

== Architecture ==
Main Building is an example of Greek Revival architecture and is accented with Italianate designs. The facade of the four-story building contains a central portico supported by four Doric columns. Balusters are located between these columns on the three upper levels. The balconies offer views of downtown Raleigh.

The building consists of three wings. The first and second floors of Main Building are occupied by faculty and administrative offices. The third and fourth floors are used as dormitory rooms by approximately 50 students. The West Wing contains the Williams Board Room, the Blue Parlor, offices, and the James Dinwiddie Chapel. The East Wing contains Career Services, Academic Advising, Adventures Program, Educational Support Services, and the Leggett Theater complex.

Other buildings that have been constructed on the college campus are similar in architectural style to the Main Building.

== See also ==
- List of Registered Historic Places in North Carolina
- Women's colleges in the United States
