= 504 Oakwood Avenue =

House in Raleigh, North Carolina

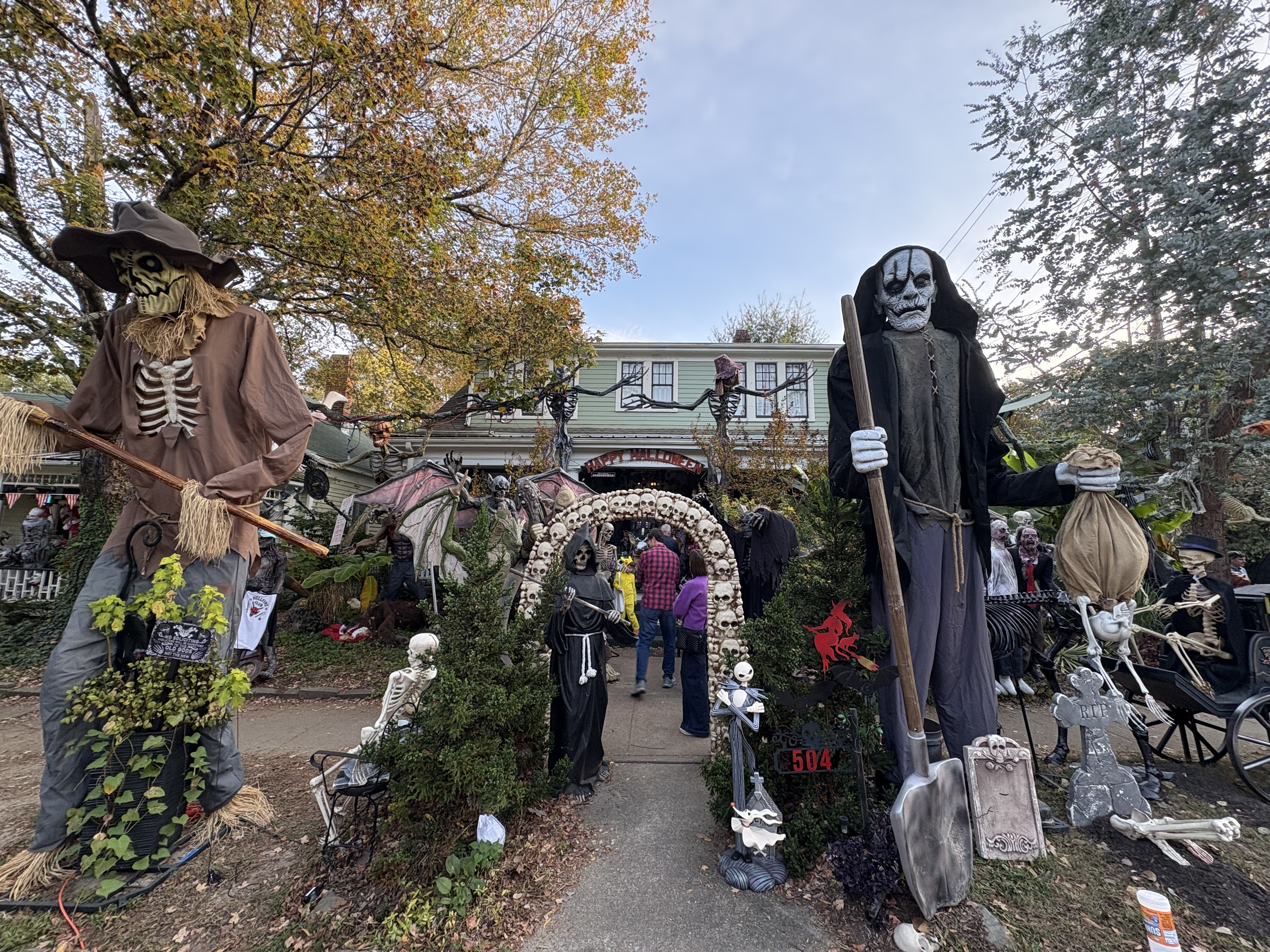
- The house decorated for Halloween in 2025.
- Interactive map of the 504 Oakwood Avenue area
- Alternative names: Oakwood Halloween House

General information
- Status: Active
- Type: private residence
- Location: 504 Oakwood Avenue; Raleigh, North Carolina, U.S.
- Coordinates: 35°47′04″N 78°37′55″W
- Owner: Jesse Jones and Sue Jones

504 Oakwood Avenue, commonly known as the Oakwood Halloween House, is a house in Raleigh, North Carolina that is regionally notable for its annual Halloween decorations. It is located in the Historic Oakwood neighborhood.

== About ==
The house was built in the 19th century and is located in downtown Raleigh's Historic Oakwood neighborhood. It is owned by Jesse and Sue Jones. The home is notable for its annual Halloween decorations, including zombies and skeletons filling the property. Jesse Womble Jones, a defense attorney and former North Carolina State Wolfpack football player, started decorating the house annually in 2012. The house is affectionally known in North Carolina as the "Oakwood Halloween House".
