= Merrimon-Wynne House =

Historic house in North Carolina, United States

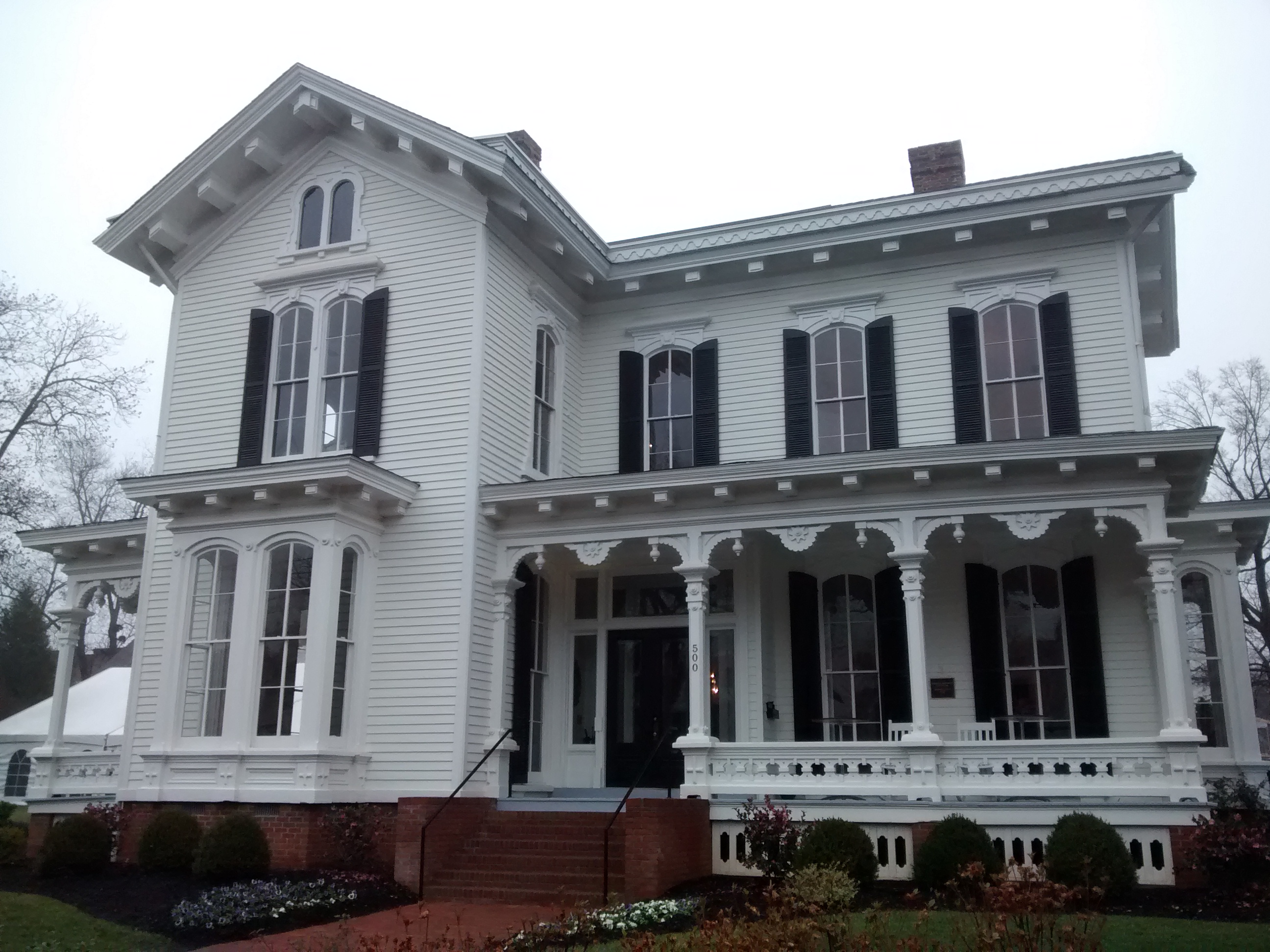
- Merrimon-Wynne House, December 2014
- Interactive map of Merrimon-Wynne House
- 35°47′11″N 78°38′09″W
- Location: 500 N. Blount St., Raleigh, North Carolina

History
- Built: c. 1875

Site notes
- Area: 0.25 acres (0.10 ha)
- Architectural styles: Italianate, Stick/Eastlake
- Merrimon-Wynne House
- U.S. National Register of Historic Places
- Location within North Carolina Location within the United States
- NRHP reference No.: 14000523
- Added to NRHP: August 25, 2014
- Merrimon House
- Formerly listed on the U.S. National Register of Historic Places
- Location: 526 N. Wilmington St., Raleigh, North Carolina
- Coordinates: 35°47′13″N 78°38′14″W
- NRHP reference No.: 75001296

Significant dates
- Added to NRHP: September 5, 1975
- Removed from NRHP: August 23, 2008

Merrimon-Wynne House, also known as the Merrimon House and Wynne Hall, is a historic home located at Raleigh, Wake County, North Carolina. The house, located within the Blount Street Historic District, was built about 1875, and is a two-story, four-bay, Italianate style frame dwelling with a cross-gabled roof and somewhat irregular massing. It is sheathed in weatherboard and features a Stick Style / Eastlake movement front porch with abundant ornamentation. The house was remodeled and complementary bay windows added about 1910. The house was built by Senator Augustus Summerfield Merrimon (1830-1892).

The property was previously listed in the National Register of Historic Places in 1975 as the Merrimon House, when it stood at 526 North Wilmington Street. It was delisted in 2008, after it was relocated. It was relisted on the National Register of Historic Places in 2014 at its new location.

== History ==
Augustus Summerfield Merrimon built The Merrimon-Wynne House in 1876 to serve as his private residence on N. Wilmington street in Raleigh. The Merrimon estate sold the home in 1899 to Louisa "Lula" Brookshire Page, wife Frank Page. She and her next husband, Stanhope Wynne, would deed the house to Peace College in 1919. It served as the "Wynne Hall" dormitory until 1934. The North Carolina Division of Archives and History successfully nominated the house to the National Register of Historic Places in September 1975.

In the early 1970's, the house was acquired by the state and converted into office space.

In 2008, the Blount Street Commons development group purchased the home. The developers moved it to its current site at the corner of Blount and Polk streets in downtown Raleigh. This site also served as the birthplace of Dr. Jane McKimmon, a leader in home demonstration and adult education in North Carolina.

In 2013, the house was purchased by Heyens Hospitality and renovated into a wedding and special event venue, and is used as such to this day.
