= Capehart House =

Historic house in North Carolina, United States

- U.S. National Register of Historic Places
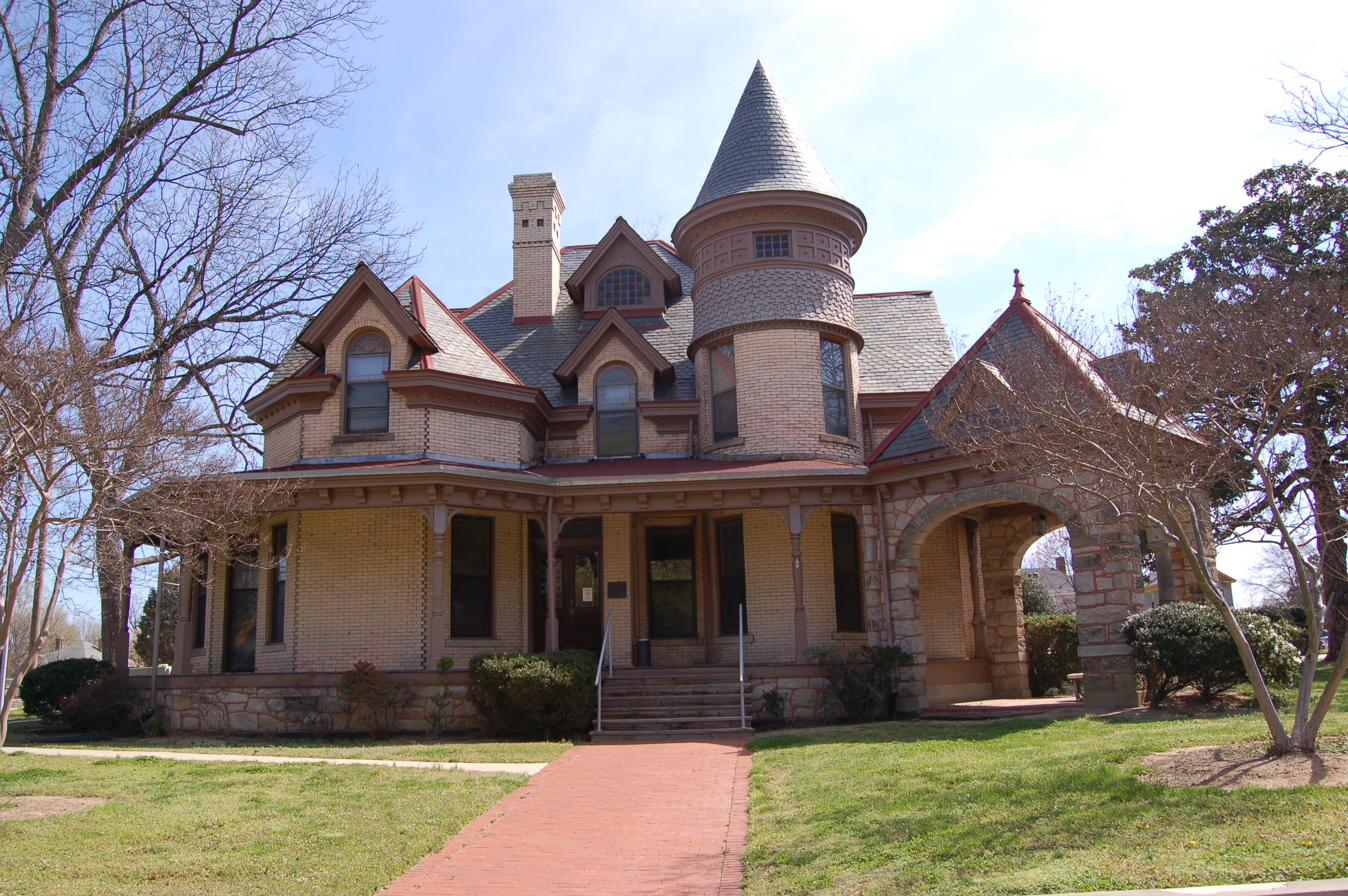

- Location within North Carolina Location within the United States
- Location: N. Blount St., Raleigh, North Carolina
- Coordinates: 35°56′28″N 78°34′3″W
- Area: less than one acre
- Built: c. 1898
- Built by: Snuggs, Charles P.
- Architectural style: Queen Anne
- NRHP reference No.: 75001293
- Added to NRHP: January 17, 1975

The Capehart House is a Queen Anne style house built circa 1898 by Charles P. Snuggs for Lucy Catherine Capehart and her second husband, B. A. Capehart. Located on 424 North Blount Street in Raleigh, Wake County, North Carolina, it is one of the best examples of Queen Anne style architecture still standing in Raleigh. The Capehart House has an irregular skyline made of towers, turrets, dormers, and pediments, and luxurious facades ornamented with stained glass and decorative wooden designs.

After Capehart's death, H. H. Crocker owned the home, which was used for apartments, until 1947. The state bought the house in 1971, and has been used as governmental office space since. In 1979, the house was moved from its former location at 403 North Wilmington Street to 424 North Blount Street.

It was listed on the National Register of Historic Places in 1975.
