= Leonidas L. Polk =

American politician

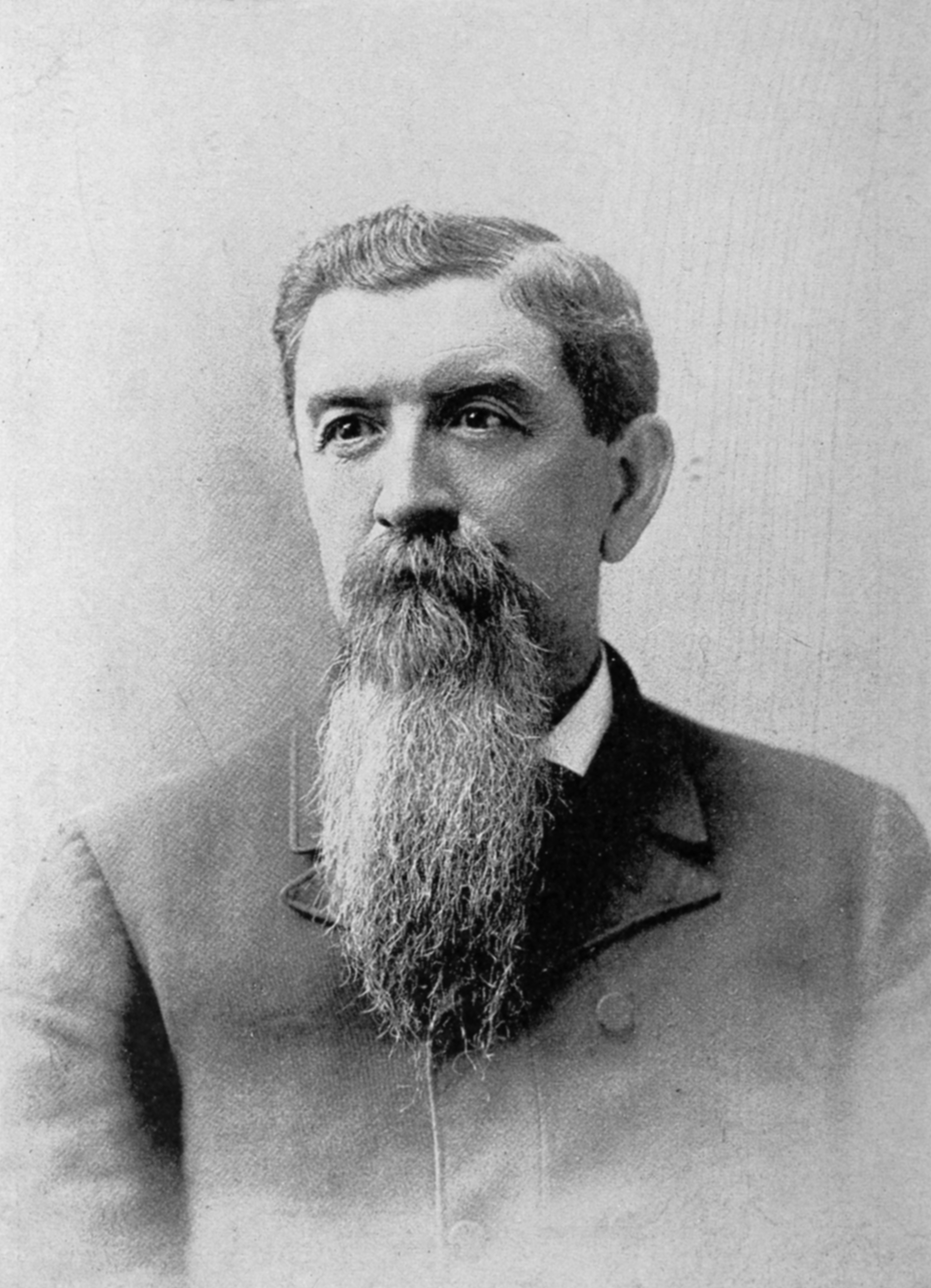

1st North Carolina Commissioner of Agriculture
- In office 1877–1880
- Governor: Zebulon Baird Vance; Thomas Jordan Jarvis
- Preceded by: None
- Succeeded by: Montford McGehee

Member of the North Carolina House of Representatives
- In office 1860–1862
- In office 1864–1866

Delegate to the North Carolina Constitutional Convention
- In office 1865–1866

Personal details
- Born: Leonidas Lafayette Polk; April 24, 1837 Anson County, North Carolina, U.S.
- Died: June 11, 1892 (aged 55) Washington, D.C., U.S.
- Resting place: Oakwood Cemetery, Raleigh, North Carolina
- Party: Populist
- Spouse: Sarah Pamela Gaddy Polk
- Education: Davidson College

Military service
- Allegiance: Confederate States
- Branch/service: Confederate States Army
- Rank: 2nd Lieutenant
- Unit: 43rd North Carolina Infantry
- Battles/wars: American Civil War: Battle of Gettysburg

Leonidas Lafayette Polk (April 24, 1837 – June 11, 1892), or L.L. Polk, was an American farmer, journalist and political figure. He was a leader of the Farmers' Alliance and helped found the Populist Party.

== Life and career ==
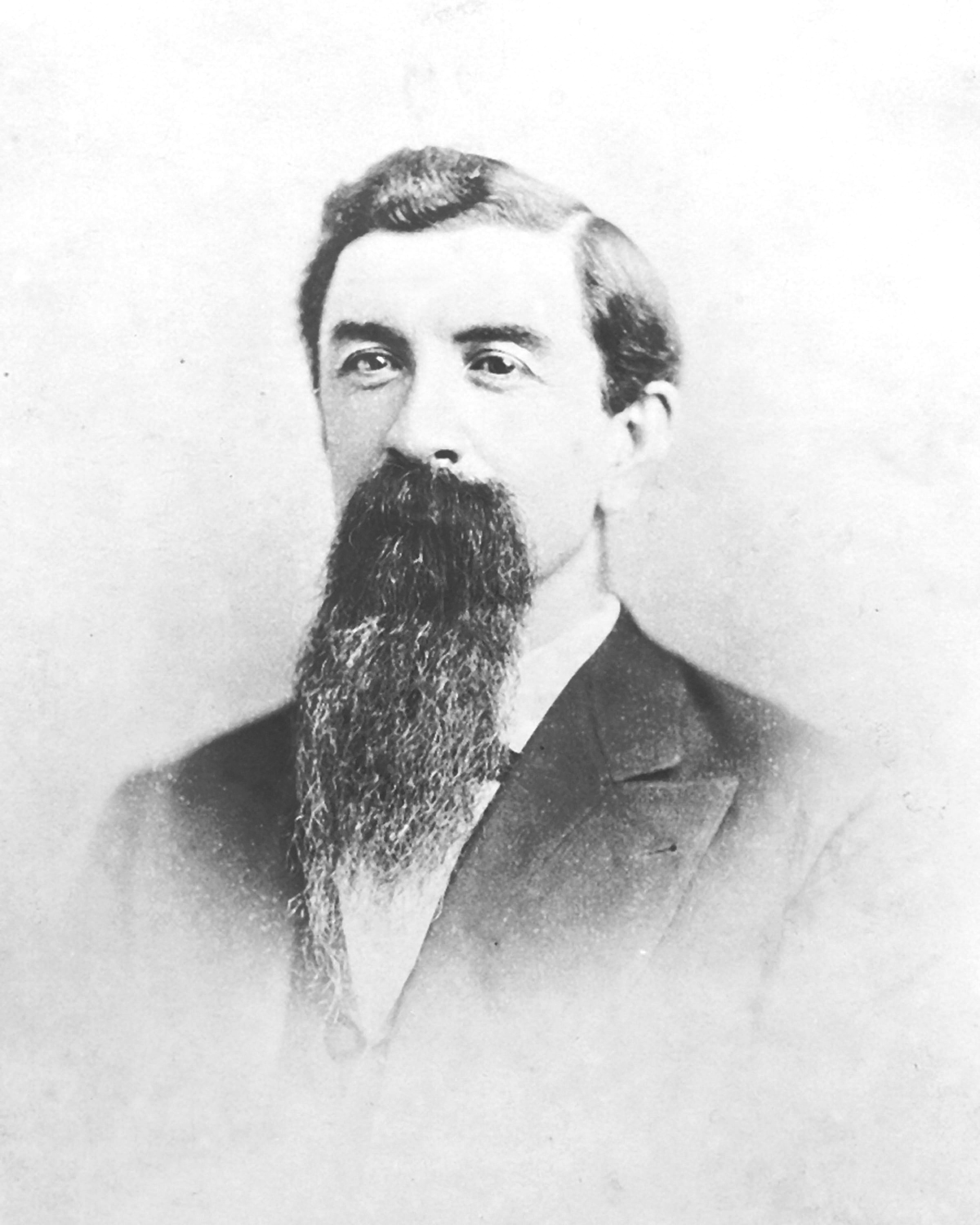
Polk, undated

Leonidas LaFayette Polk was born in Anson County, North Carolina on April 24, 1837 to Andrew Polk and Lorena Autry Polk. Through his father, he was a member of the notorious Polk family, and thus a distant cousin of President James K. Polk. He was orphaned by the age of 14 years. In 1860, he was elected to the North Carolina General Assembly as a Whig Party candidate.

He fought in the American Civil War for the Confederate States of America, and was wounded at the Battle of Gettysburg.

Returning to North Carolina after the war, Polk founded the town of Polkton, incorporated in 1875, where he started a weekly newspaper called The Ansonian. Through it he advocated for farmers and for the Grange movement. Polk then became active in state politics, serving in the North Carolina House of Representatives and as a delegate to the state constitutional convention in 1865–66. In 1877, he was appointed the first North Carolina Commissioner of Agriculture and served until 1880. An agricultural collection he established as Commissioner was the basis for what became the North Carolina Museum of Natural Sciences.

Polk returned to journalism by founding the Progressive Farmer in 1886 in Winston. The magazine is still published to this day. At first, the paper's primary aim was to teach new agricultural methods, but soon it also focused on politics.

Meanwhile, Polk was also active in the Baptist church, once serving as president of the Baptist State Convention of North Carolina. Polk was instrumental in establishing the North Carolina Agricultural and Mechanical College (now N.C. State University) and Baptist Female University (now Meredith College).

In the late 1880s, Polk rose to nationwide prominence through his leadership of the state and national Farmers' Alliance, which had begun in Texas. He became its national vice president in 1887 and its president in 1889. These words, spoken in 1887, were typical of Polk's rhetoric: "Our farmers buy everything to raise cotton, and raise cotton to buy everything, and, after going through this treadmill business for years, they lie down and die and leave their families penniless."

The Alliance's mixed record under traditional two-party politics paved the way for the Populist Party, or People's Party. Polk presided over the meeting in February 1892 that formally created the party. The Populists likely would have nominated Polk for president in 1892 (see 1892 U.S. presidential election), but he died unexpectedly from a hemorrhaging bladder in Washington, D.C., on June 11, 1892.

== Legacy ==
Polk was inducted into the North Carolina Agricultural Hall of Fame in 1957.

His home in Raleigh is today owned by the state of North Carolina. It was moved on Nov. 12, 2000, to its new location on Blount Street in Raleigh. The Leonidas LaFayette Polk House Foundation plans to use part of the house for the Polk Museum. The rest will be used for state offices. The Leonidas L. Polk House was listed on the National Register of Historic Places in 1977.

Polk Hall at North Carolina State University was named in his honor shortly after its completion in 1926.

== Bibliography ==
- Biography from the North Carolina Agricultural Hall of Fame website
- Under One Roof, an article from the North Carolina Museum of Natural Sciences website
- North Carolina History Project biography
- Agricultural Depression. Its Causes—the Remedy, an April 22, 1890 speech by Polk, from a UNC website
- Poe, Clarence (October 1942). "L. L. Polk: A Great Agrarian Leader in a Fifty-Year Perspective". South Atlantic Quarterly. 41 (4): 405–415. doi:10.1215/00382876-41-4-405.
- Powell, William S. North Carolina: A History. 1988. pp. 173–175.

Political offices
| Preceded by None | 1st North Carolina Commissioner of Agriculture; 1877–1880 | Succeeded by Montford McGehee |
