= Bailey-Bunn House =

Historic house in Raleigh, North Carolina

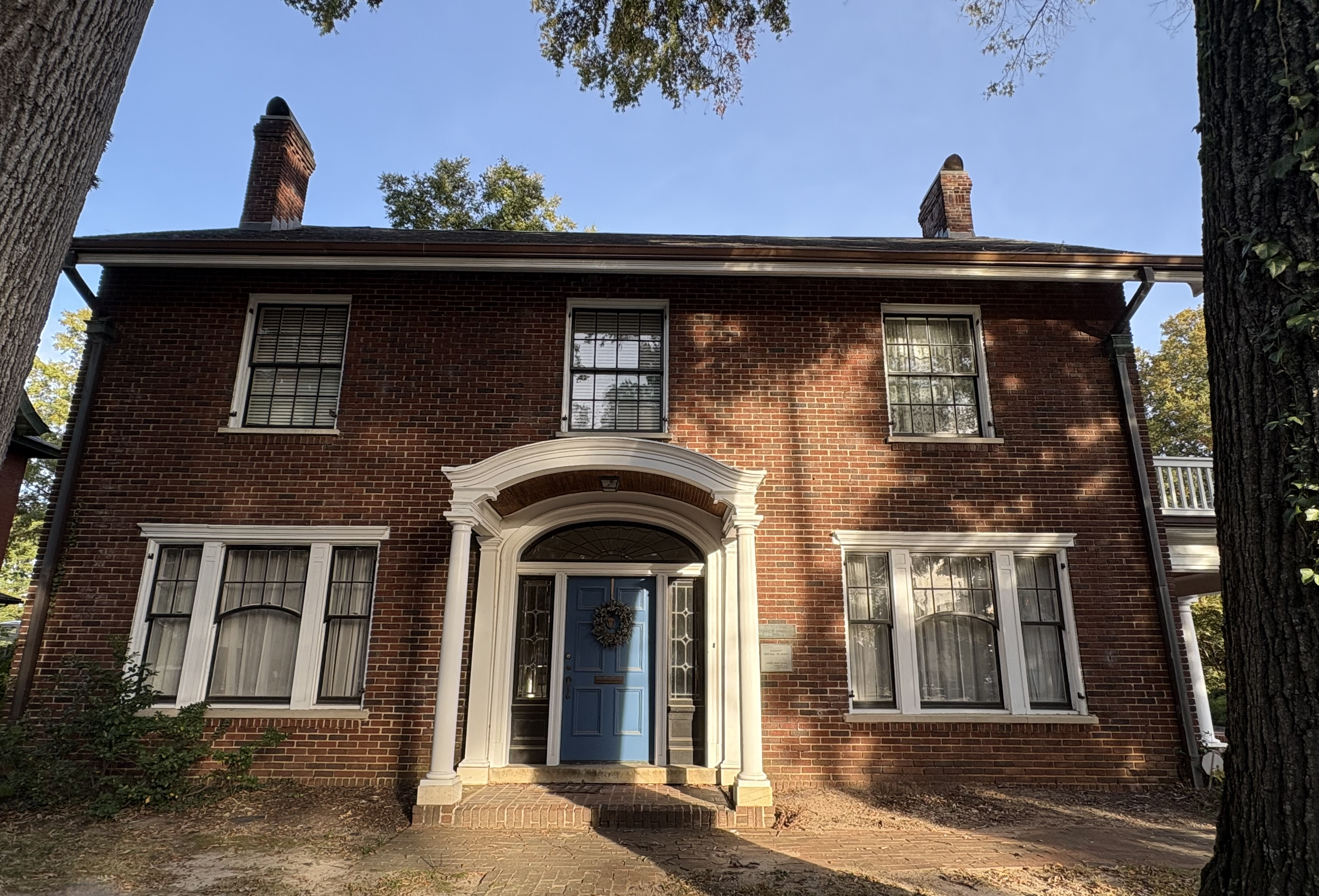
- The house in 2025

General information
- Status: Active
- Type: residence, headquarters
- Architectural style: Georgian Revival
- Location: 302 N Blount Street; Raleigh, North Carolina, U.S.
- Coordinates: 35°47′02″N 78°38′09″W
- Owner: Hawkins family Bailey family United Daughters of the Confederacy

The Bailey-Bunn House is a historic Georgian Revival house in the Blount Street Historic District of downtown Raleigh, North Carolina. It serves as the state headquarters for the North Carolina Division of the United Daughters of the Confederacy. The house is located between the Lieutenant Governor's Mansion and the Governor's Mansion.

== History ==
The house was constructed at 302 North Blount Street in the early twentieth century. It was completed in 1922. The two story home was built with brick and designed in the Georgian Revival style. It was built in the side yard of the Hawkins-Hartness House for Mrs. Hawkins's niece, Martha Hawkins Bailey. The house is also around the corner from the Bailey-Tucker House, the state's former official guest house.

It is located in the North Blount Street Historic District, next door to the Offices of the Lieutenant Governor of North Carolina and across the street from the North Carolina Executive Mansion.

The house serves as the state headquarters for the North Carolina Division of the United Daughters of the Confederacy. When the Confederate monument Silent Sam was removed from the campus of the University of North Carolina at Chapel Hill in 2019, one of the suggested locations for its relocation was the Bailey-Bunn House.
