= Garland Scott and Toler Moore Tucker House =

Historic house in North Carolina, United States

- U.S. National Register of Historic Places
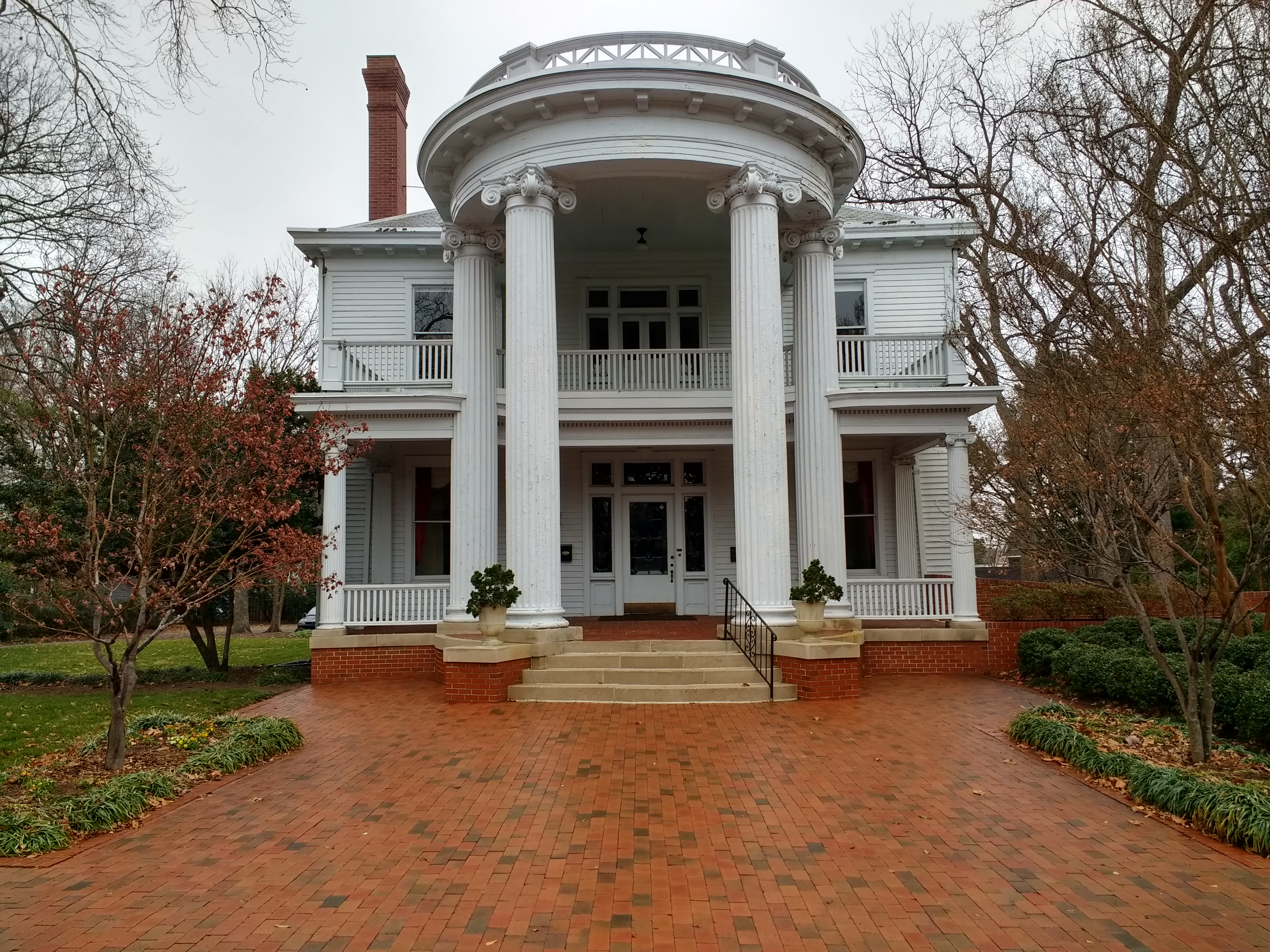

- Location within North Carolina Location within the United States
- Location: 418 N. Person St., Raleigh, North Carolina
- Coordinates: 35°47′07″N 78°38′04″W
- Area: 0.67 acres (0.27 ha)
- Built: 1914
- Built by: Caylor and Snider
- Architect: Kennedy, James M.
- Architectural style: Southern Colonial Revival
- NRHP reference No.: 14001024
- Added to NRHP: December 10, 2014

Garland Scott and Toler Moore Tucker House is a historic home located in the Oakwood neighborhood of Raleigh, North Carolina. It is located in the Oakwood Historic District. The house was built in 1914, and is a two-story, Southern Colonial Revival style frame dwelling with rear wings and porches. It has a brick foundation, weatherboard siding, and a slate-covered hipped roof. The front facade features a monumental rounded double-height porch, with four enormous fluted Ionic order columns. It was moved from its original located at 420 North Blount Street to 418 North Person Street, in 1974.

It was listed on the National Register of Historic Places in 2014.
