= Lewis-Smith House =

Historic house in North Carolina, United States

- U.S. National Register of Historic Places
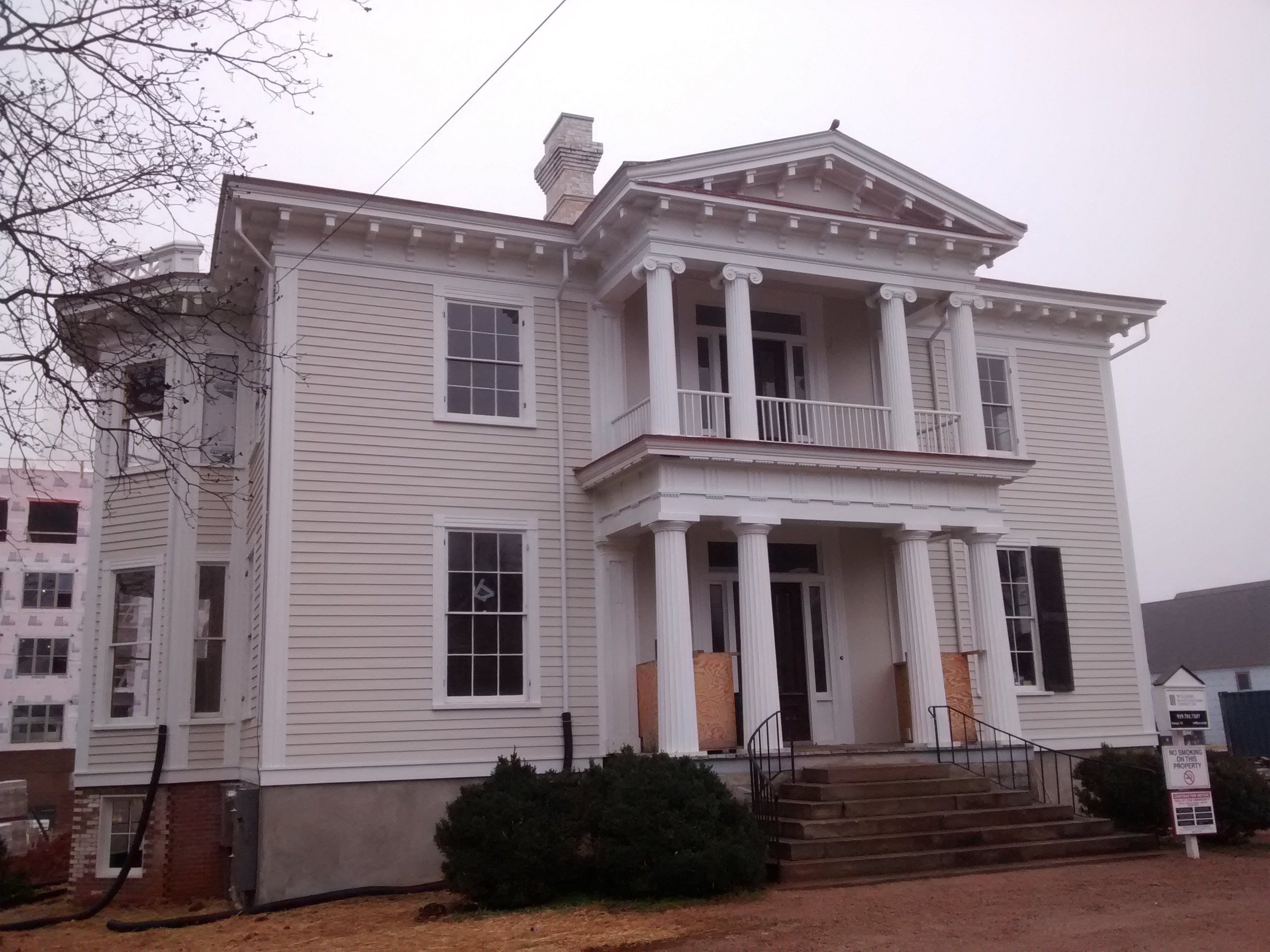
- Lewis-Smith House, December 2014

- Location within North Carolina Location within the United States
- Location: N. Blount St., Raleigh, North Carolina
- Coordinates: 35°47′8″N 78°38′8″W
- Area: less than one acre
- Built: c. 1854-1856
- Architectural style: Greek Revival, Italianate
- NRHP reference No.: 72001001
- Added to NRHP: December 11, 1972

Lewis-Smith House is a historic home located at Raleigh, Wake County, North Carolina, USA It was built between 1854 and 1856, and is a two-story, three-bay, Greek Revival-style frame dwelling with a low hipped roof and Italianate-style brackets. The house is located in the Blount Street Historic District. It features a two-tier pedimented entrance portico, with paired Doric order columns at the first level and well-detailed Ionic order ones at the second. Two-story, demi-octagonal projecting bays were added to the sides in the early-20th century.

It was listed on the National Register of Historic Places in 1972.
