= Historic Oakwood =

Historic district in Raleigh, North Carolina

- Oakwood Historic District
- U.S. National Register of Historic Places
- U.S. Historic district
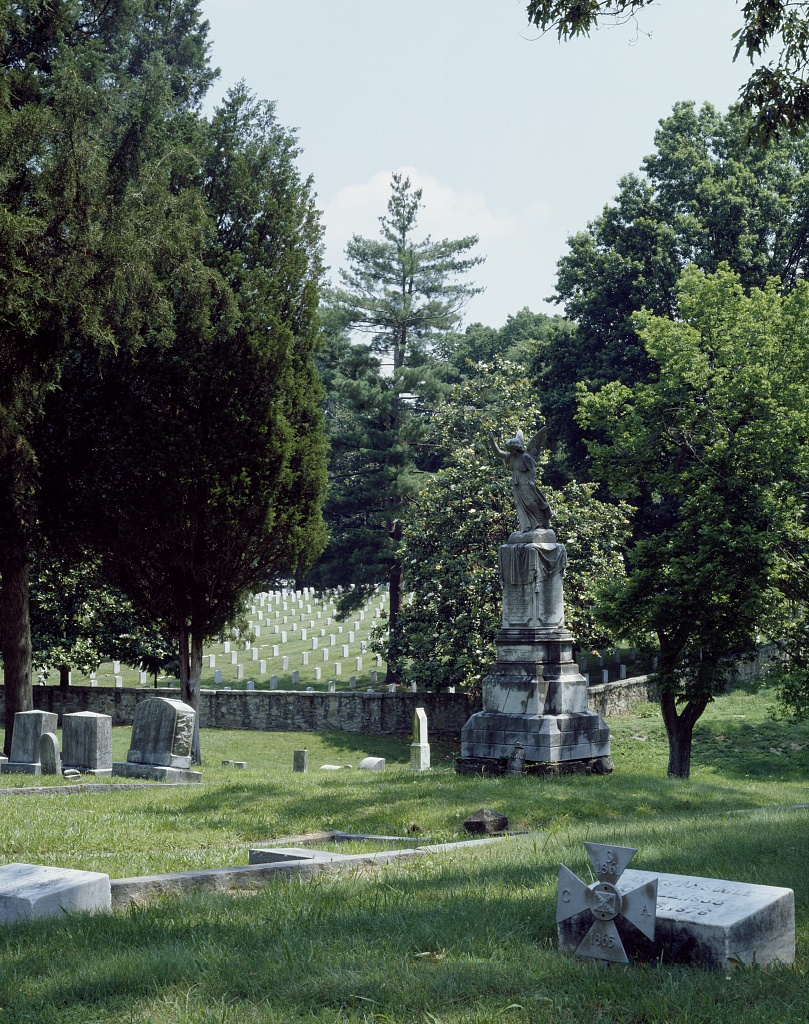
- Oakwood Confederate Cemetery

- Location within North Carolina Location within the United States
- Location: Roughly bounded by N. Boundary, Person, Jones, and Linden Sts., and Oakwood Cemetery, Raleigh, North Carolina
- Coordinates: 35°47′04″N 78°37′24″W
- Area: 190 acres (77 ha)
- Architect: Briggs, T.H; Et al.
- Architectural style: Second Empire, Queen Anne, Classical Revival
- NRHP reference No.: 74001380 (original); 87001787 (increase 1); 87002235 (increase 2); 88003044 (increase 3)

Significant dates
- Added to NRHP: June 25, 1974
- Boundary increases: October 21, 1987; January 6, 1988; January 9, 1989

Historic Oakwood is a neighborhood in downtown Raleigh, North Carolina, United States, on the National Register of Historic Places, that is known for its Historic Oakwood Cemetery and many Victorian and Second Empire houses. Located near the State Capitol, during the 19th century Historic Oakwood was home to prominent members of Raleigh's society. It is North Carolina's largest, intact 19th Century residential neighborhood and Raleigh's earliest white upper-class suburb. Unlike later suburbs, it developed lot-by-lot over time, instead of by platted sections. Its Victorian-era architectural styles include Second Empire, Queen Anne, and Italianate. Later infill brought the bungalow, the American Foursquare, American Craftsman style, and the Minimal Traditional house to the area.

Oakwood is also known for its Christmas Candlelight Tour, which opens private historic residences to the public, and the Garden Tour, which allows the public to see the vast gardens worked on by the Oakwood Gardening Club.

Oakwood was listed on the National Register of Historic Places in 1974, with additions made in 1987, 1988, and 1989. It is also one of six local historic overlay districts (HOD). Several Oakwood residences are also individually recognized as Local Historic Landmarks.

== Notable buildings ==
- 504 Oakwood Avenue
- Garland Scott and Toler Moore Tucker House
- Heck-Lee, Heck-Wynne, and Heck-Pool Houses
- Leonidas R. Wyatt House

== Gallery ==
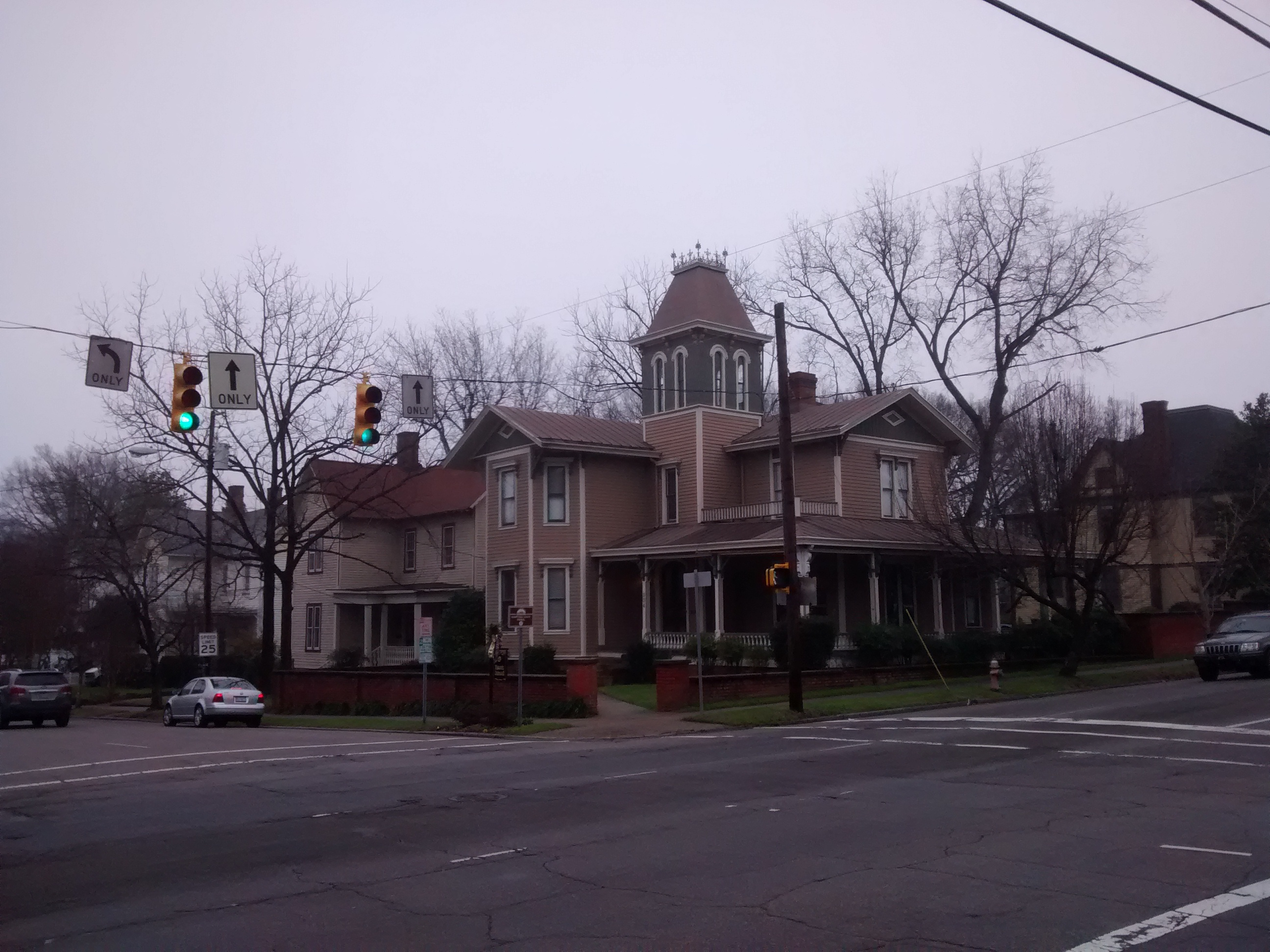
Corner of Person Street and Jones Street

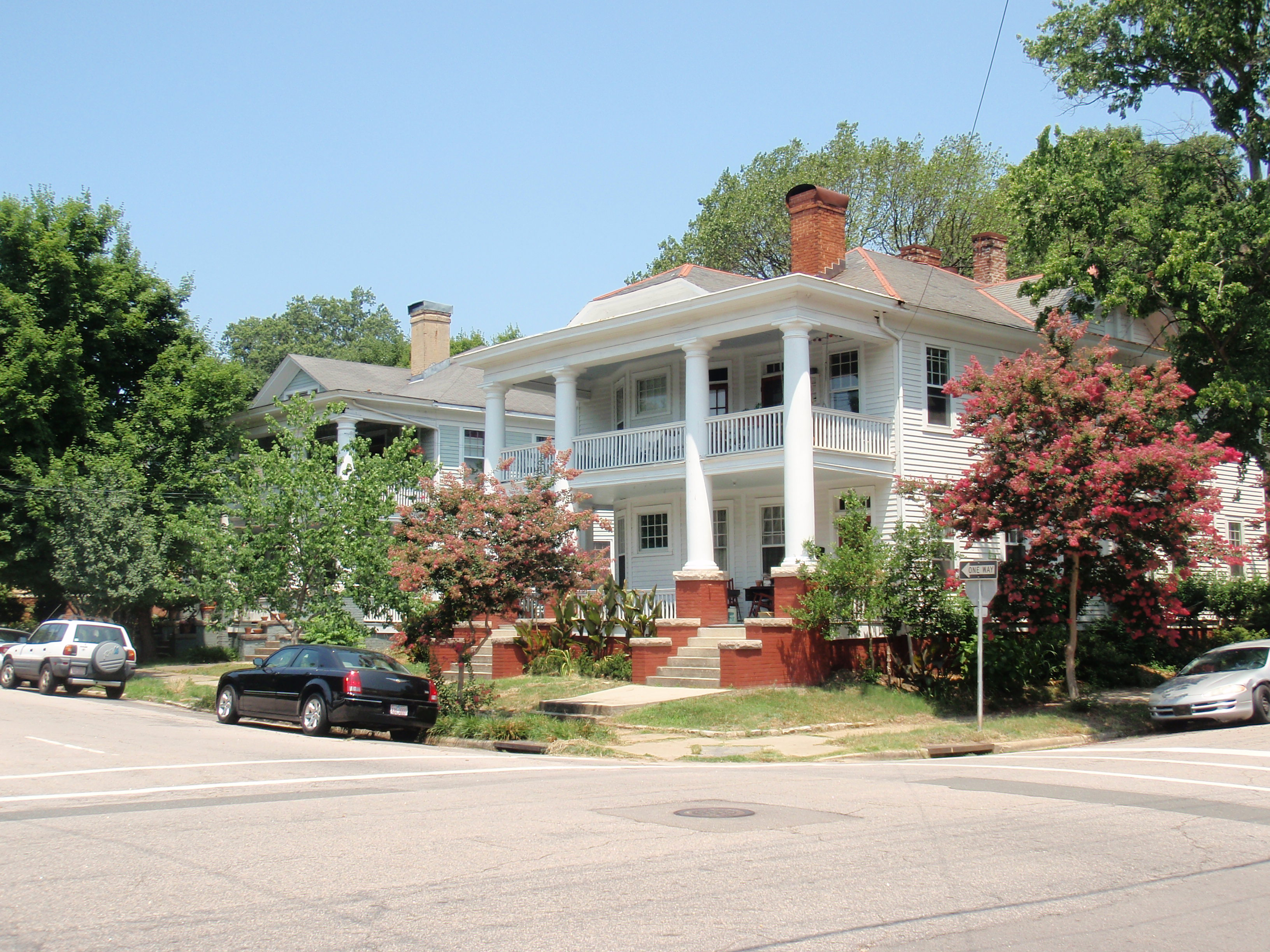
Houses in Oakwood

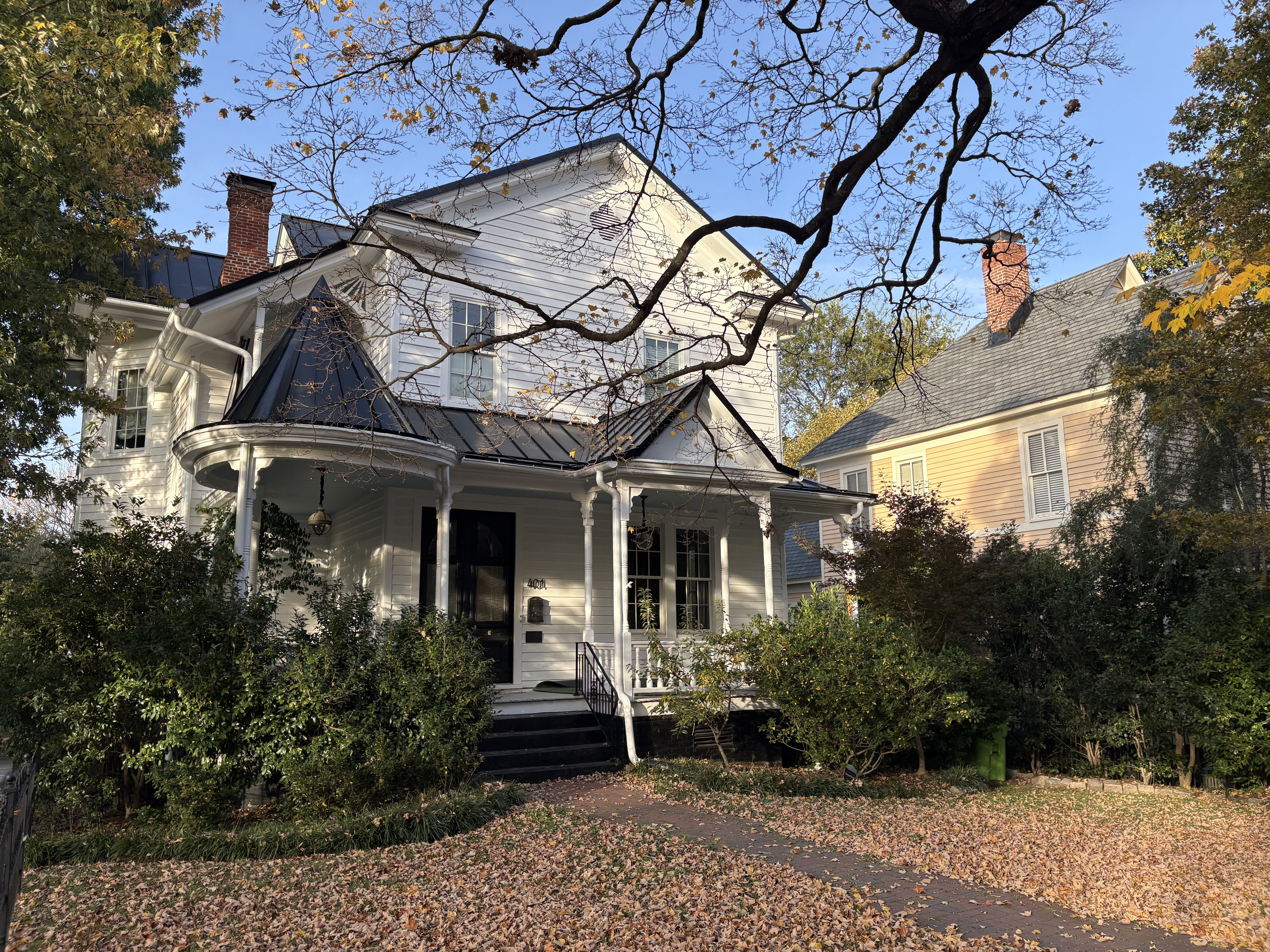
Victorian house in Oakwood

== See also ==
- Historic Oakwood Cemetery
