= Minerva Ruffin Cain Caldwell =

First Lady of North Carolina (1871–1874)

First Lady of North Carolina
- In office March 22, 1871 – July 11, 1874
- Governor: Tod Robinson Caldwell
- Preceded by: Louisa Virginia Harrison Holden
- Succeeded by: vacant

Second Lady of North Carolina
- In office 1868–1871
- Preceded by: None (office established)

Personal details
- Born: Minerva Ruffin Cain; July 19, 1820 Hillsborough, North Carolina, U.S.
- Died: June 21, 1890 (aged 69) Morganton, North Carolina, U.S.
- Party: Republican
- Spouse: Tod Robinson Caldwell
- Children: 3

Minerva Ruffin Cain Caldwell (July 19, 1820 – June 21, 1890) was an American political hostess who, as the wife of Governor Tod Robinson Caldwell, served as First Lady of North Carolina from 1871 to 1874.

== Biography ==
Caldwell was born Minerva Ruffin Cain in 1820. She was the daughter of Mary Ruffin and William Cain of Hillsborough, North Carolina. She was a niece of Judge Thomas Ruffin.

She married Tod Robinson Caldwell on December 12, 1840. They had at least four children: Mary Ruffin Caldwell, wife of Dr. Waighstill Collett; John "Jack" Caldwell, killed at Gettysburg; Martha R. Caldwell, wife of Edward W. Ward; and Hannah J. Caldwell, wife of Walter Brem.

She served as second lady and then as first lady of North Carolina during the Reconstruction Period, during her husband's terms as lieutenant governor and governor.

Caldwell died of heart disease in Morganton, North Carolina in 1890.
