= Augustus Summerfield Merrimon =

American judge

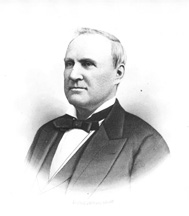

United States Senator from North Carolina
- In office March 4, 1873 – March 4, 1879
- Preceded by: John Pool
- Succeeded by: Zebulon B. Vance

Personal details
- Born: September 15, 1830 Asheville, North Carolina
- Died: November 14, 1892 (aged 62) Raleigh, North Carolina
- Party: Democratic

Augustus Summerfield Merrimon (September 15, 1830 – November 14, 1892) was a Democratic U.S. senator from the state of North Carolina between 1873 and 1879.

An attorney from Buncombe County, North Carolina, Merrimon served in the North Carolina House of Commons from 1860 to 1861. He briefly served in the Confederate Army when the American Civil War broke out, but resigned to become solicitor (prosecutor) for North Carolina's eighth judicial district. After the war, Merrimon served as a state superior court judge, then returned to the practice of law, and was an unsuccessful Democratic (at the time, officially called the Conservative Party) candidate for Governor of North Carolina in 1872. With 49.5 percent of the vote, Merrimon lost an extremely close race to incumbent Tod R. Caldwell.

Merrimon was elected to the U.S. Senate in 1872. He and former Gov. Zebulon B. Vance had already become intense political enemies, though both were affiliated with the Conservative Party. After Vance won the endorsement of the Conservative Party in the legislature, the minority Republicans in the legislature voted with Merrimon's supporters to elect him to the Senate.

During his term in the Senate, Merrimon gained a reputation as "one of the bitterest partisan Democrats in Congress" (New York Times, October 14, 1878). He was appointed to the 'South Carolina Committee,' a Congressional commission assigned to conduct hearings into voter intimidation and fraud during the 1876 elections in South Carolina—the elections which brought an end to Reconstruction and restored white supremacists to power. The only Democrat on the Committee, Merrimon badgered black and white Republican witnesses and attempted to downplay and excuse white atrocities. A full transcript of the testimony can be found in the 3 bound volumes (South Carolina in 1876) published by the 42nd Congress. After Vance was elected Governor in 1876, he began recruiting candidates to defeat Merrimon supporters in legislative races to lay the groundwork to take Merrimon's seat in the Senate. In the legislative election of 1878, the state Democrats ran two slates in many districts: one pledged to Merrimon and one pledged to Vance. The result was mixed; the Republicans gained 13 seats in the legislature, and the majority Democrats were still divided in their loyalties (Merrimon 40 to Vance 60 with 70 Republicans). The Republican legislators voted for Vance in the election in early 1879, giving him the majority.

After being defeated for re-election, Merrimon served as an associate justice (1883–1889) and then Chief Justice of the North Carolina Supreme Court (1889 until his death in 1892). Merrimon Avenue in Asheville is named in his memory.

His home at Raleigh, the Merrimon-Wynne House, was listed on the National Register of Historic Places in 1975, and again in 2014 following a move.

Party political offices
Preceded by Thomas Samuel Ashe	Democratic nominee for Governor of North Carolina; 1872	Succeeded by Zebulon Baird Vance
U.S. Senate
Preceded by John Pool	U.S. senator (Class 3) from North Carolina; 1873–1879; Served alongside: Matt W. Ransom	Succeeded by Zebulon B. Vance
Legal offices
Preceded by William N. H. Smith	Chief Justice of North Carolina Supreme Court; 1889–1892	Succeeded by James E. Shepherd
