= Leonidas L. Polk House =

Historic house in North Carolina, United States

- U.S. National Register of Historic Places
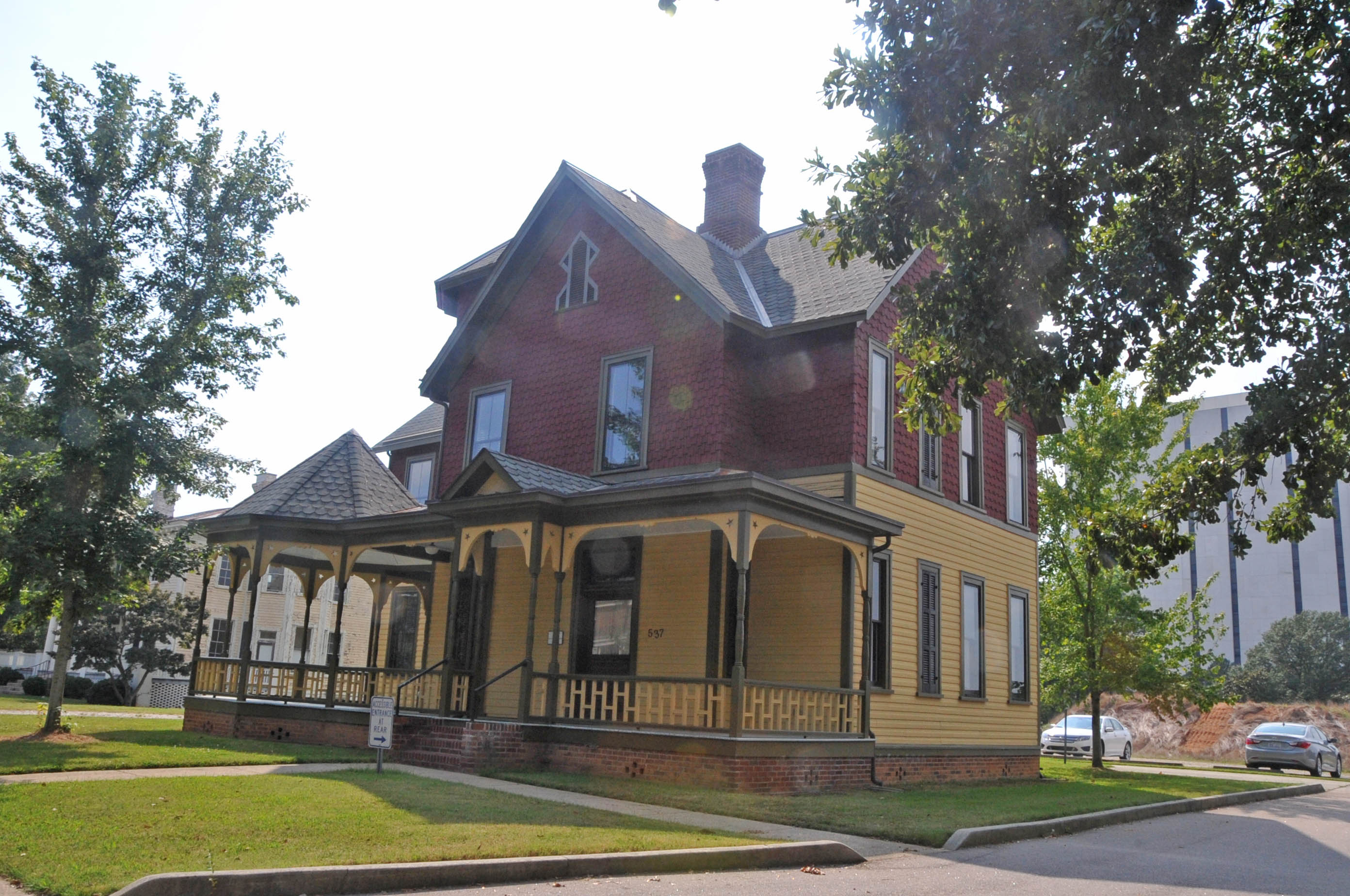

- Location within North Carolina Location within the United States
- Location: 612 N. Blount St., Raleigh, North Carolina
- Coordinates: 35°47′13.75″N 78°38′11″W
- Area: less than one acre
- Built: c. 1891
- Architectural style: Late Victorian
- NRHP reference No.: 77001012
- Added to NRHP: April 13, 1977

Leonidas L. Polk House is a historic home located at Raleigh, Wake County, North Carolina. It was built about 1891, and is a two-story, two bay by five bay, Late Victorian Shingle Style frame dwelling with a one-story frame wing. It features a corner turret and a front sawnwork porch with star-shaped ornament. The house was moved to the rear of 612 N. Blount Street in the mid-1960s. It was the home of Leonidas L. Polk (1837-1892), an American farmer, journalist and political figure.

It was listed on the National Register of Historic Places in 1977.
