= Heck-Lee, Heck-Wynne, and Heck-Pool Houses =

Historic houses in Raleigh, North Carolina

- U.S. National Register of Historic Places
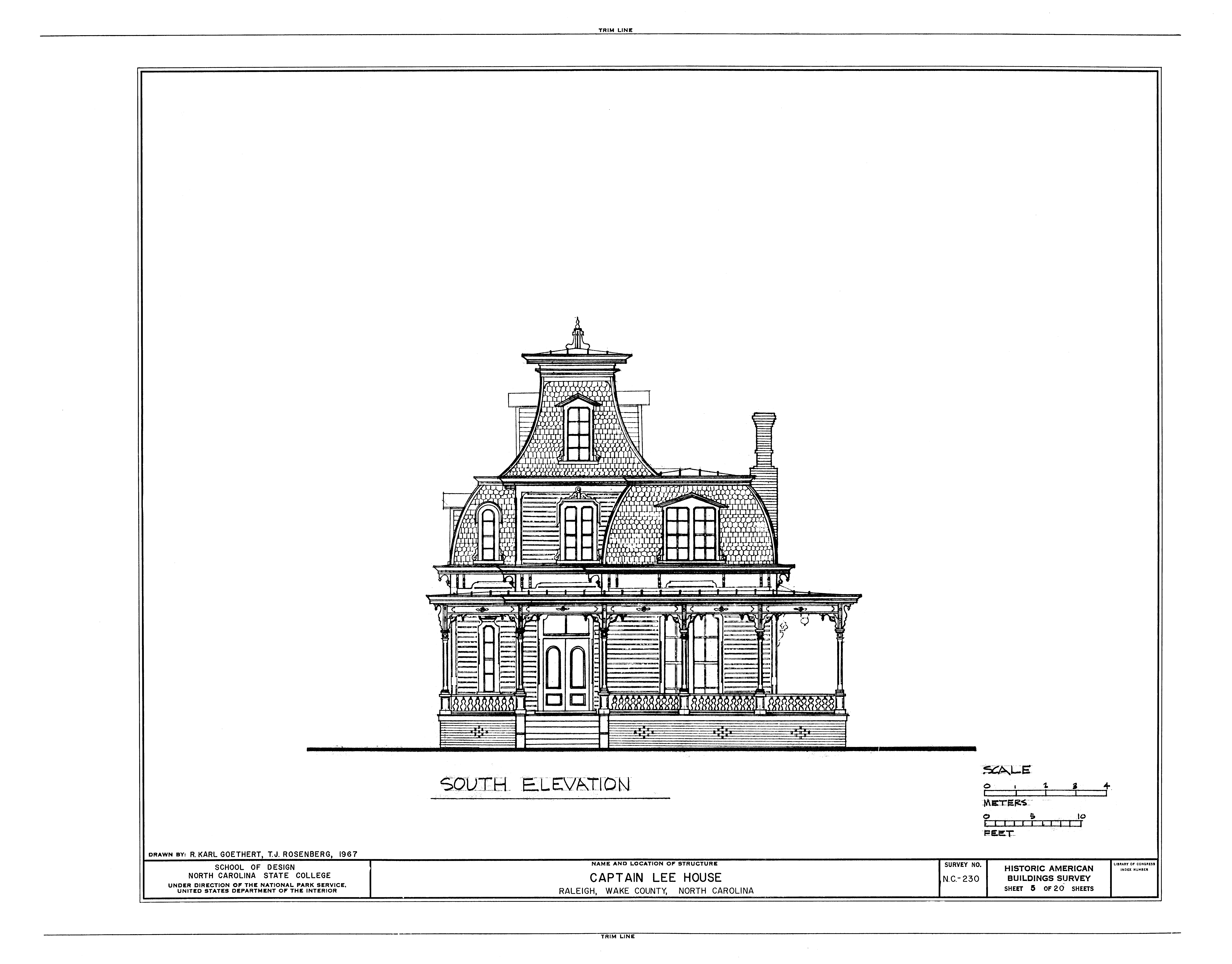
- Captain Lee House, HABS Drawing

- Location within North Carolina Location within the United States
- Location: 503 and 511 E. Jones St. and 218 N. East St., Raleigh, North Carolina
- Coordinates: 35°46′58″N 78°37′58″W
- Area: 3 acres (1.2 ha)
- Built: 1871-1875
- Architectural style: Stick/eastlake, Second Empire
- NRHP reference No.: 73001374
- Added to NRHP: April 13, 1973

Heck-Lee, Heck-Wynne, and Heck-Pool Houses are three historic homes located in the Historic Oakwood neighborhood in Raleigh, North Carolina. They were built between 1871 and 1875, and are 1 1/2-story, L-shaped, Second Empire-style frame dwellings on brick foundations. They feature an Eastlake movement wrap-around porch, a full-height mansard roof and a 2 1/2-story corner mansard tower. Formerly separate kitchens have been connected to the main houses by additions.

The houses were listed on the National Register of Historic Places in 1973.

== Gallery ==
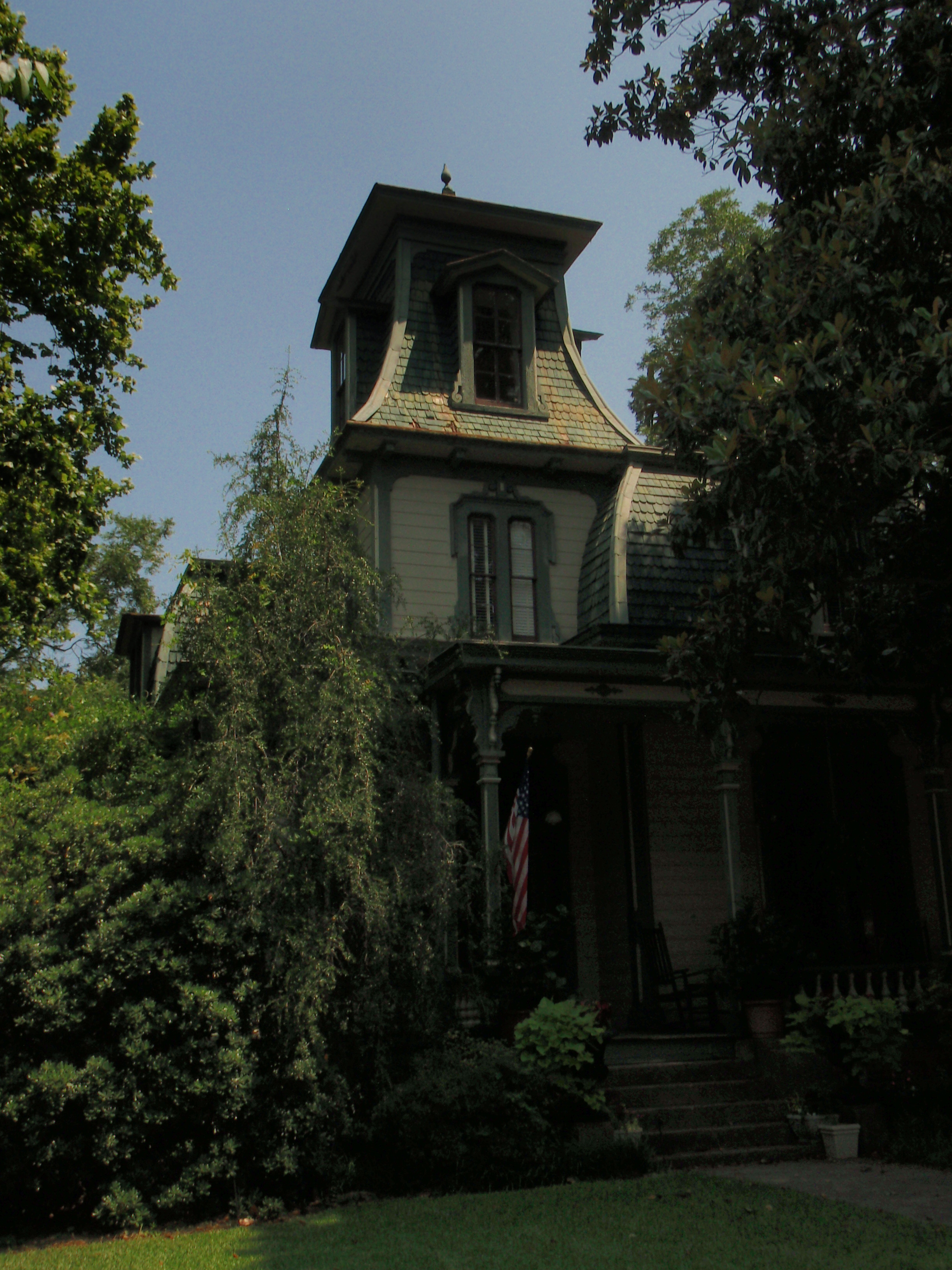
Heck-Lee House in 2010

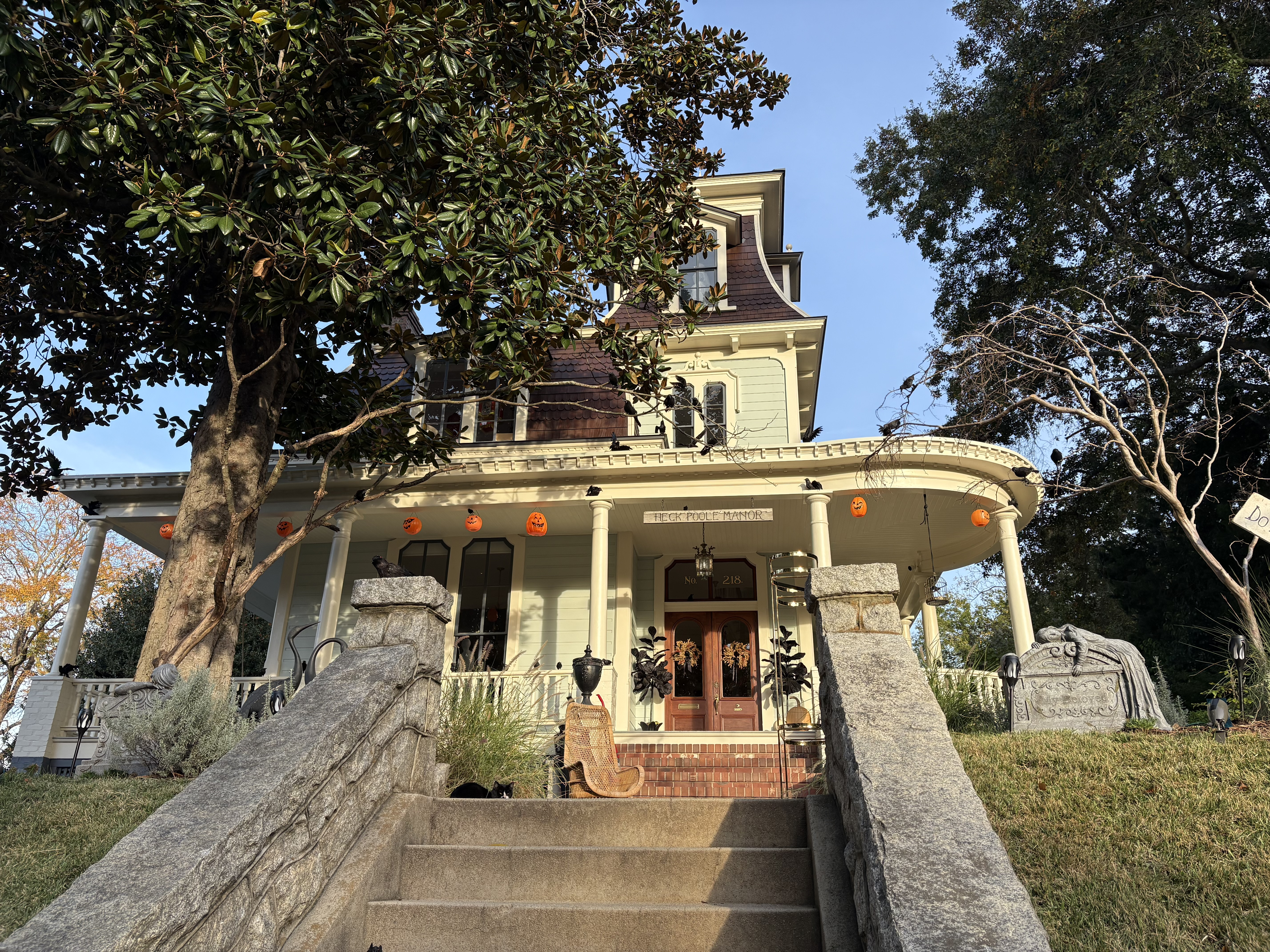
Heck-Pool House in 2025

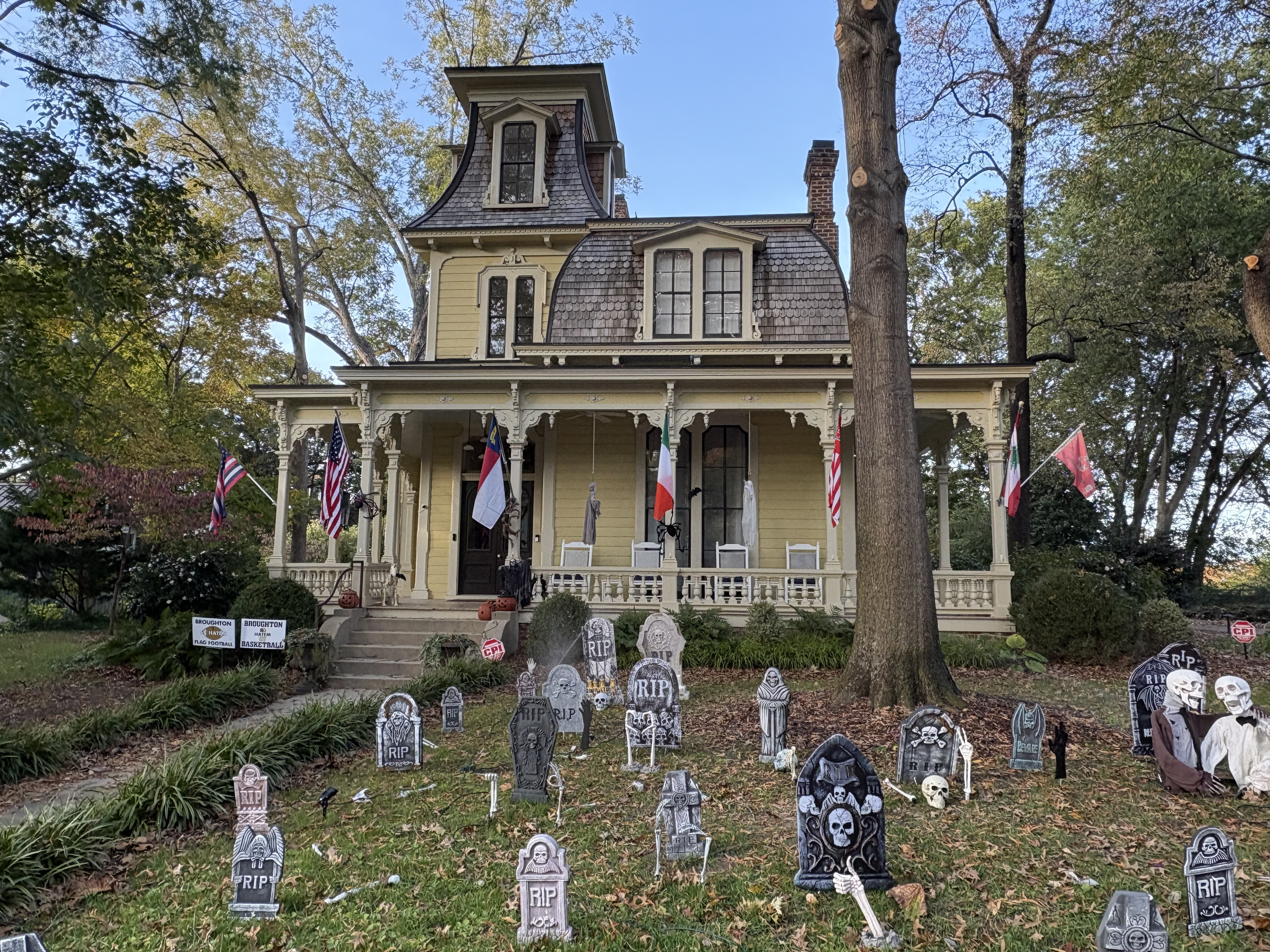
Heck-Wynne House in 2025
