= 1872 North Carolina gubernatorial election =

- August 1, 1872
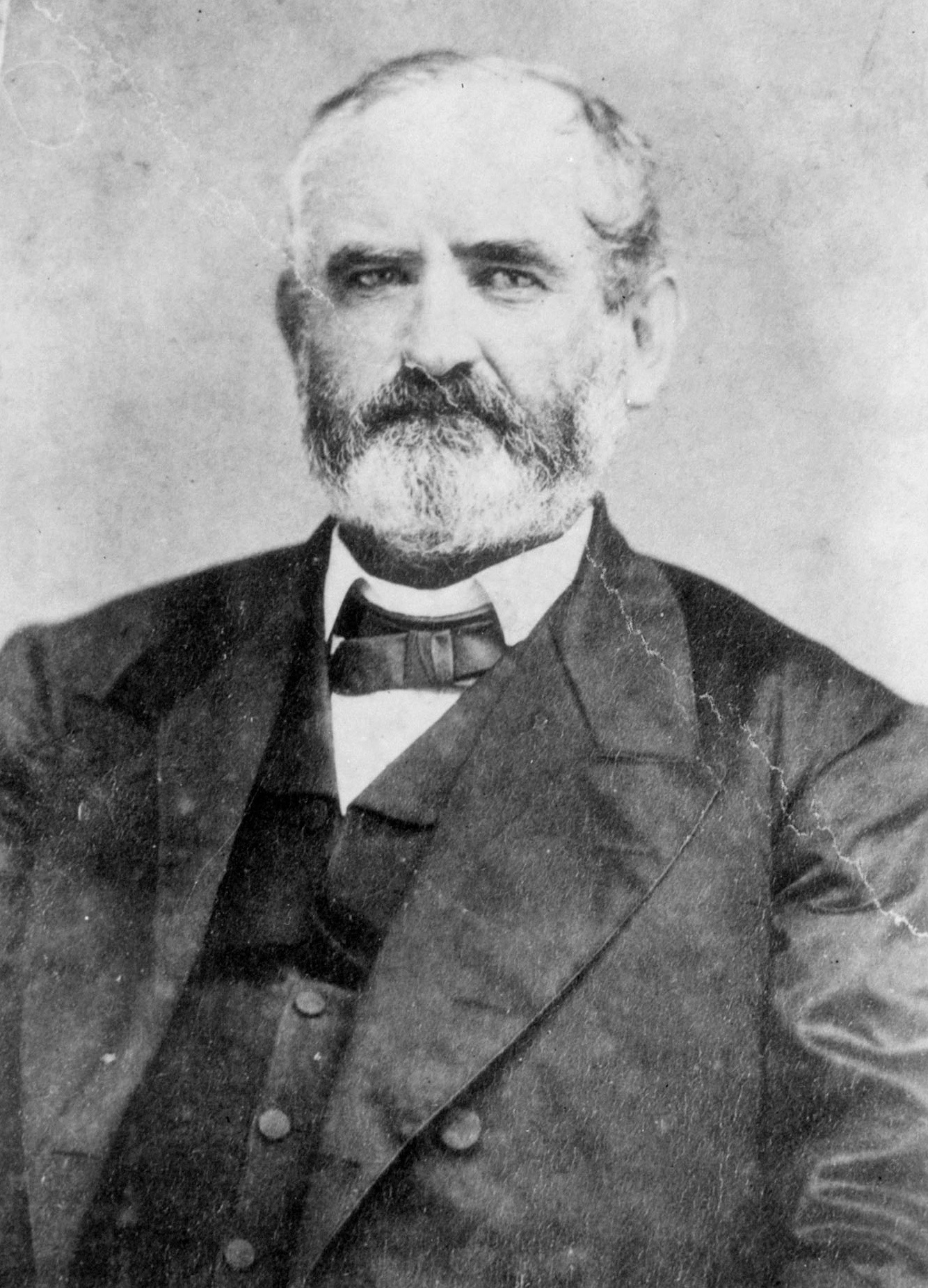

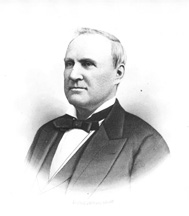
Nominee	Tod Robinson Caldwell	Augustus Summerfield Merrimon
Party	Republican	Democratic
Popular vote	98,630	96,731
Percentage	50.49%	49.51%
- County results Caldwell: 50–60% 60–70% 70–80% Merrimon: 50–60% 60–70% 70–80% 80–90% 90–100% No Data/Vote
Governor before election
Tod Robinson Caldwell
Republican
Elected Governor
Tod Robinson Caldwell
Republican

The 1872 North Carolina gubernatorial election was held on August 1, 1872. Incumbent Republican Tod Robinson Caldwell, who defeated Thomas Settle and Oliver H. Dockery for the Republican nomination, defeated Conservative Party (Democratic) nominee Augustus Summerfield Merrimon, who defeated James Madison Leach and Daniel Moreau Barringer for the Democratic nomination, with 50.49% of the vote.

This was the last time a Republican candidate won an outright majority of the vote until the 1972 gubernatorial election.

== General election ==
=== Candidates ===
- Tod Robinson Caldwell, Republican
- Augustus Summerfield Merrimon, Democratic

=== Results ===
1872 North Carolina gubernatorial election
Party	Candidate	Votes	%	±%
Republican	Tod Robinson Caldwell (incumbent)	98,630	50.49%	
Democratic	Augustus Summerfield Merrimon	96,731	49.51%	
Majority		1,899		
Turnout				
Republican hold		Swing		
