= Leonidas R. Wyatt House =

Historic house in North Carolina, United States

- U.S. National Register of Historic Places
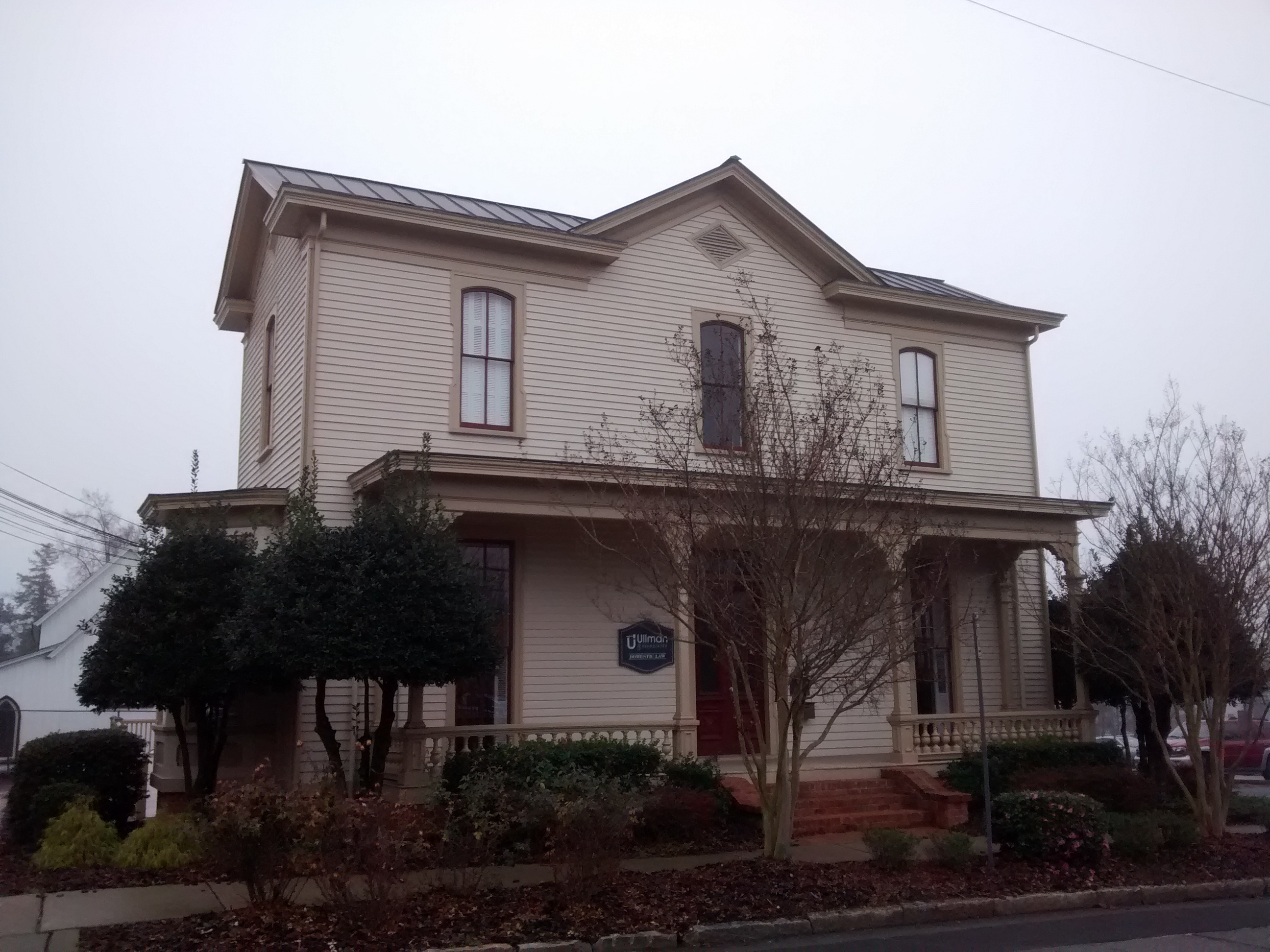
- Leonidas R. Wyatt House, December 2014

- Location within North Carolina Location within the United States
- Location: 107 S Bloodworth St., Raleigh, North Carolina
- Coordinates: 35°46′43″N 78°37′59″W
- Area: less than one acre
- Built: 1881-1882
- Built by: Briggs, Thomas
- Architectural style: Italianate
- NRHP reference No.: 90001030
- Added to NRHP: July 5, 1990

Leonidas R. Wyatt House is a historic home in Raleigh, Wake County, North Carolina. It was built in 1881-1882 and is a two-story, "Triple-A" frame I-house with Italianate-style design elements. It has two one-story real ells connected by a hyphen. It has a hipped and shed-roofed wing added in the early 20th century and a small second-story, shed-roofed rear wing added in the 1920s. It was moved to its present location in June 1988.

It was listed on the National Register of Historic Places in 1990.
