= Bailey-Tucker House =

Historic house in Raleigh, North Carolina

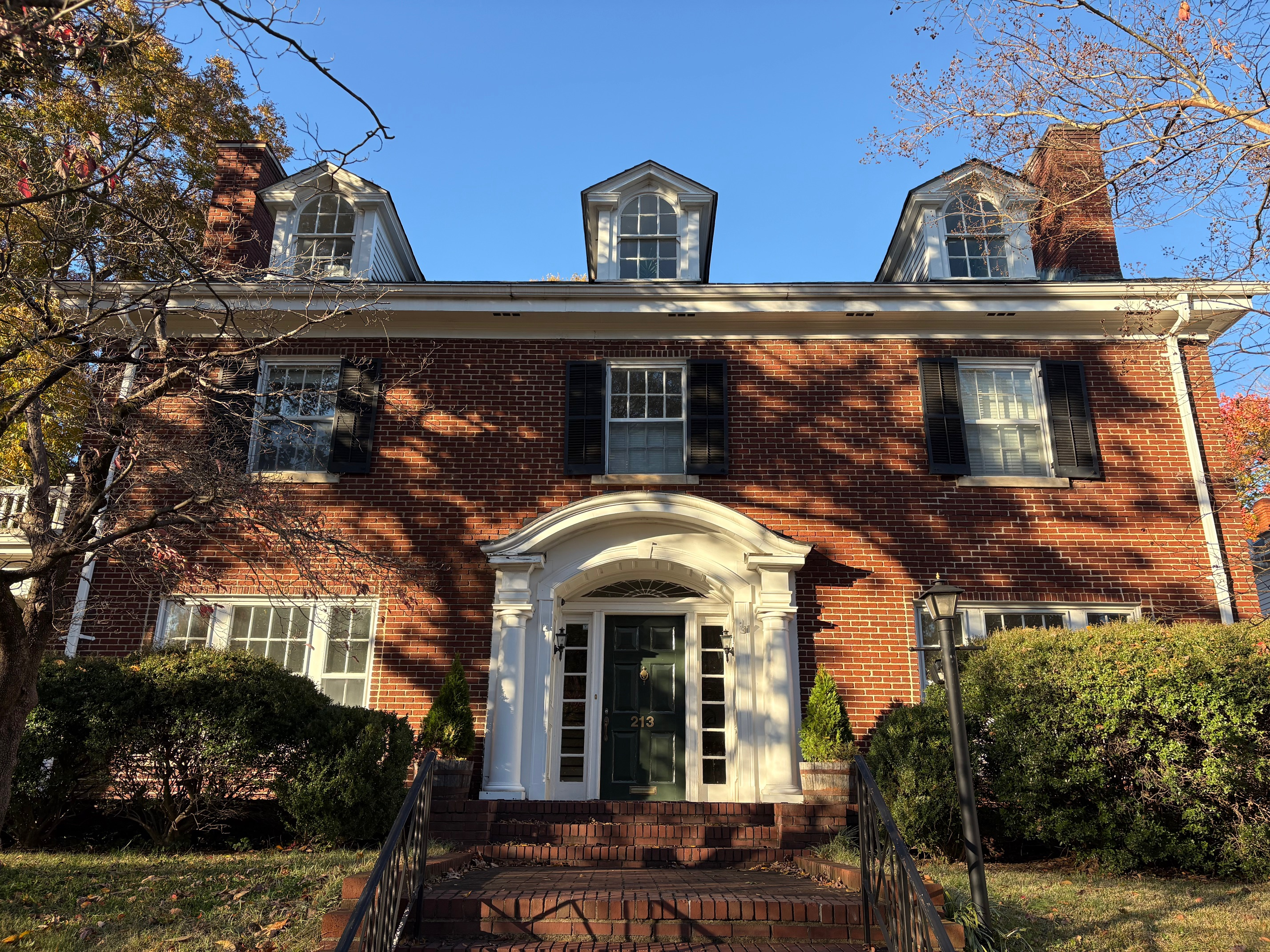
- The house in 2025.
- Interactive map of Bailey-Tucker House

General information
- Type: law office (current) residence (former)
- Architectural style: Georgian Revival
- Location: 213 E. Lane Street; Raleigh, North Carolina, U.S.
- Coordinates: 35°47′02″N 78°38′08″W

The Bailey-Tucker House is a historic mansion in the Blount Street Historic District of downtown Raleigh, North Carolina. North Carolina First Lady Carolyn Hunt established the house as the state's official guest residence during her husband's term as governor. Notable guests at the house included U.S. Vice President Al Gore; Anne, Princess Royal; Dipendra, Crown Prince of Nepal; and Israeli Prime Minister Shimon Perez. The state government sold the house in 2016 and it has since been used as a law office.

== History ==
The Bailey-Tucker House was built around 1917. It is located at 213 E. Lane Street in the North Blount Street Historic District, around the corner from the Bailey-Bunn House and across the street from the North Carolina Executive Mansion.

The home was purchased by the state of North Carolina in 1967. North Carolina First Lady Carolyn Hunt, wife of Governor Jim Hunt, designated the house as the state's official guest residence. During the Hunt administration, the governor's relatives, state officials, federal officials, and members of the governor's office and cabinet stayed in the house. Notable guests that stayed in the house include U.S. Vice President Al Gore, former North Carolina Governor James G. Martin, Israeli Prime Minister Shimon Perez, Chinese official Quan Shuren, Andy Griffith, The Princess Royal, and The Crown Prince of Nepal. Other notable guests included the U.S. Attorney General, the U.S. Secretary of Education, and governors of other states.

Governor Mike Easley and First Lady Mary Pipines Easley lived in the Bailey-Tucker House for over two years while the North Carolina Executive Mansion was undergoing renovations.

In 2016, the state government sold the house. The house was purchased by the attorney and Democratic state representative Duane Hall for $900,000 to use as a law office. Hall rented part of the house out as law offices for Gus Gusler.
