= Tod Robinson Caldwell =

American politician (1818–1874)

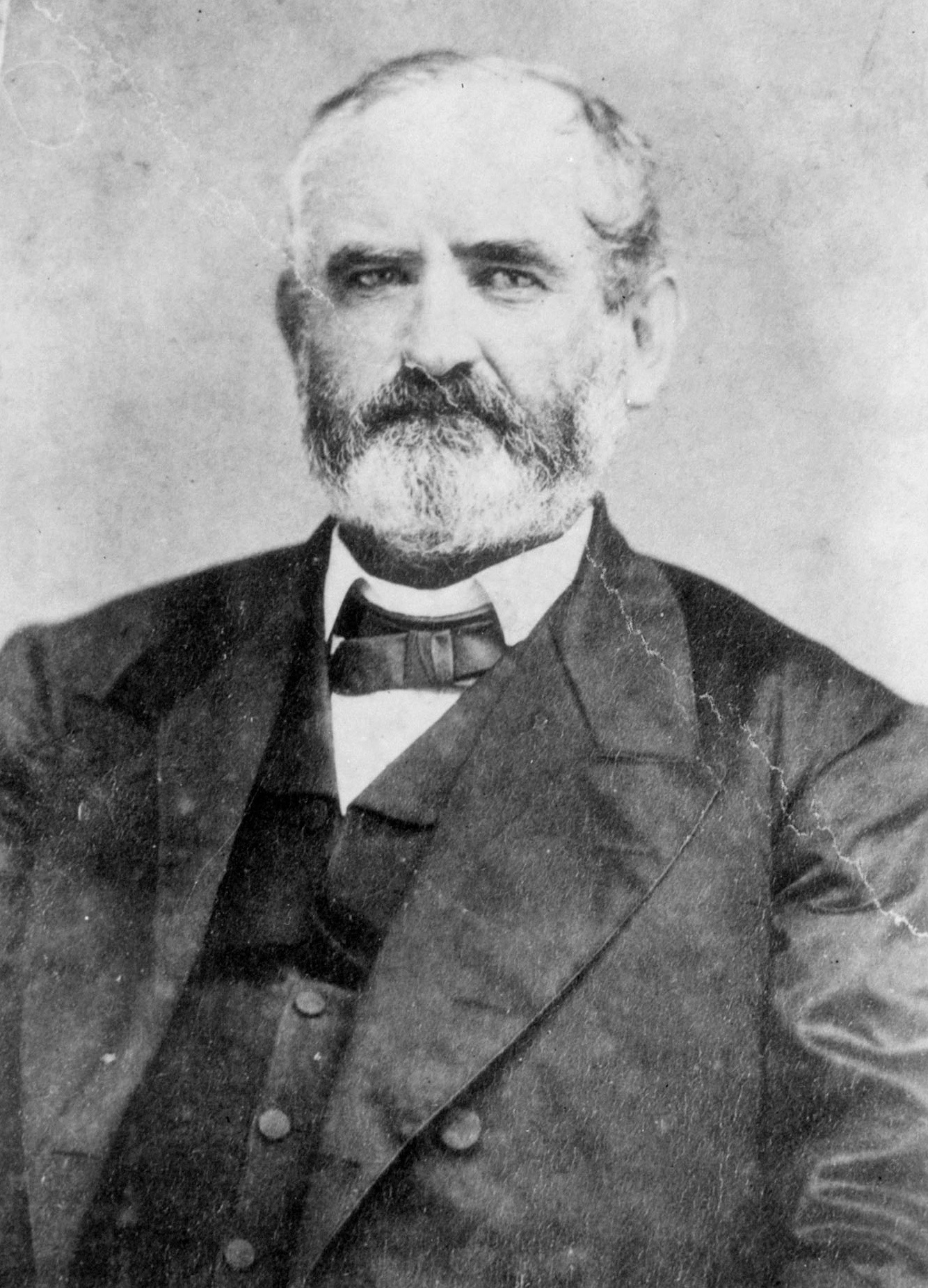

41st Governor of North Carolina
- In office March 22, 1871 – July 11, 1874
- Preceded by: William Woods Holden
- Succeeded by: Curtis Hooks Brogden

1st Lieutenant Governor of North Carolina
- In office 1868–1871
- Preceded by: None (office established)
- Succeeded by: Curtis Hooks Brogden

Member of the North Carolina Senate
- In office 1850–1851

Member of the North Carolina House of Commons
- In office 1842–1845, 1848–1849

Personal details
- Born: February 19, 1818 Morganton, North Carolina, U.S.
- Died: July 11, 1874 (aged 56) Hillsborough, North Carolina, U.S.
- Party: Republican
- Spouse: Minerva Ruffin Cain (m. 1840)
- Children: 4
- Education: University of North Carolina at Chapel Hill
- Occupation: Politician, lawyer, railman

Tod Robinson Caldwell (February 19, 1818 – July 11, 1874) was an American lawyer and the 41st governor of the U.S. state of North Carolina from 1871 until his death in Hillsborough in North Carolina in 1874.

== Biography ==
Caldwell was born on February 19, 1818, to John Caldwell and Hannah Pickett Robinson. He was born in Morganton, North Carolina, where he had a home for most of his life. Caldwell attended the University of North Carolina at Chapel Hill, graduating on June 4, 1840. He was a member of the Dialectic Society. He was examined by the Supreme Court and admitted to Superior Court Practice (much like passing a bar examination) in June 1841, becoming solicitor for Burke County. In 1842 he was elected a member of the North Carolina House of Commons in which he served two sessions. In 1850 he represented Burke County in the state senate. After the close of the Civil War he was a member of the Reconstruction Convention, and President of Western North Carolina Railroad. Caldwell was elected the first lieutenant governor of North Carolina in 1868, the same year the state constitution had created the office. He became governor in 1871 upon the impeachment and conviction of Governor William Woods Holden. Caldwell was elected governor in his own right in 1872, by about two thousand majority, becoming the second Republican elected governor of North Carolina. His areas of interest were the state debt and the state finances and the opening of the public schools which had been closed in 1863 due to lack of money. He appointed Alexander McIver as Superintendent of Public Instruction and got a bill passed allowing private aid for public schools in order to gain funds to reopen the schools.

Caldwell married Minerva Ruffin Cain on December 12, 1840. Tod and Minerva had at least four children: Mary Ruffin Caldwell, wife of Dr. Waighstill Collett; John "Jack" Caldwell, killed at Gettysburg; Martha R. Caldwell, wife of Edward W. Ward; and Hannah J. Caldwell, wife of Walter Brem.

Shortly after arriving on July 9, 1874, at Hillsborough, Orange County, North Carolina to attend the railroad's stockholders' meeting, Caldwell fell ill and died unexpectedly on July 11, 1874, aged 56. Newspaper reports stated he died from cholera morbus. His body was returned to the state capital to lie in state after which his body was carried to Morganton and buried in the family plot in Forest Hill Cemetery.

Party political offices
First	Republican nominee for Lieutenant Governor of North Carolina; 1868	Succeeded by Curtis Hooks Brogden
Preceded by William Woods Holden	Republican nominee for Governor of North Carolina; 1872	Succeeded by Thomas Settle
Political offices
Preceded by None (office established)	Lieutenant Governor of North Carolina; 1868–1871	Succeeded by Curtis H. Brogden
Preceded by William W. Holden	Governor of North Carolina; 1871–1874	Succeeded by Curtis H. Brogden
