= List of former United States representatives (K) =

This is a complete list of former United States representatives whose last names begin with the letter K.

== Number of years and terms the member has served ==
The number of years the representative/delegate has served in Congress indicates the number of terms the representative/delegate has. Note the representative/delegate can also serve non-consecutive terms if the representative/delegate loses election and wins re-election to the House.

- 2 years - 1 or 2 terms
- 4 years - 2 or 3 terms
- 6 years - 3 or 4 terms
- 8 years - 4 or 5 terms
- 10 years - 5 or 6 terms
- 12 years - 6 or 7 terms
- 14 years - 7 or 8 terms
- 16 years - 8 or 9 terms
- 18 years - 9 or 10 terms
- 20 years - 10 or 11 terms
- 22 years - 11 or 12 terms
- 24 years - 12 or 13 terms
- 26 years - 13 or 14 terms
- 28 years - 14 or 15 terms
- 30 years - 15 or 16 terms
- 32 years - 16 or 17 terms
- 34 years - 17 or 18 terms
- 36 years - 18 or 19 terms
- 38 years - 19 or 20 terms
- 40 years - 20 or 21 terms
- 42 years - 21 or 22 terms
- 44 years - 22 or 23 terms
- 46 years - 23 or 24 terms
- 48 years - 24 or 25 terms
- 50 years - 25 or 26 terms
- 52 years - 26 or 27 terms
- 54 years - 27 or 28 terms
- 56 years - 28 or 29 terms
- 58 years - 29 or 30 terms

Name	Term	State/ Territory	Party	Lifespan
Charles A. Kading	1927–1933	Wisconsin	Republican	1874–1956
Steve Kagen	2007–2011	Wisconsin	Democratic	1949–present
Kai Kahele	2021–2023	Hawaii	Democratic	1974–present
Florence Prag Kahn	1925–1937	California	Republican	1866–1948
Julius Kahn	1899–1903; 1905–1924	California	Republican	1861–1924
Jonah Kūhiō Kalanianaʻole	1903–1922	Hawaii	Republican	1871–1922
Martin Kalbfleisch	1863–1865	New York	Democratic	1804–1873
Nicholas T. Kane	1887	New York	Democratic	1846–1887
Paul Kanjorski	1985–2011	Pennsylvania	Democratic	1937–present
Charles A. Karch	1931–1932	Illinois	Democratic	1875–1932
Raymond W. Karst	1949–1951	Missouri	Democratic	1902–1987
Frank M. Karsten	1947–1969	Missouri	Democratic	1913–1992
Joseph Karth	1959–1977	Minnesota	Democratic-Farmer-Labor	1922–2005
George A. Kasem	1959–1961	California	Democratic	1919–2002
John Kasich	1983–2001	Ohio	Republican	1952–present
John A. Kasson	1863–1867; 1873–1877; 1881–1884	Iowa	Republican	1822–1910
Bob Kasten	1975–1979	Wisconsin	Republican	1942–present
Robert Kastenmeier	1959–1991	Wisconsin	Democratic	1924–2015
John Katko	2015–2023	New York	Republican	1962–present
David S. Kaufman	1846–1851	Texas	Democratic	1813–1851
Edward Kavanagh	1831–1835	Maine	Democratic	1795–1844
Will Kirk Kaynor	1929	Massachusetts	Republican	1884–1929
Abraham Kazen	1967–1985	Texas	Democratic	1919–1987
John Kean	1883–1885; 1887–1889	New Jersey	Republican	1852–1914
Robert Kean	1939–1959	New Jersey	Republican	1893–1980
Bernard W. Kearney	1943–1959	New York	Republican	1889–1976
Carroll D. Kearns	1947–1963	Pennsylvania	Republican	1900–1976
Charles Cyrus Kearns	1915–1931	Ohio	Republican	1869–1931
Edward Keating	1913–1919	Colorado	Democratic	1875–1965
Kenneth Keating	1947–1959	New York	Republican	1900–1975
William J. Keating	1971–1974	Ohio	Republican	1927–2020
Elizabeth Kee	1951–1965	West Virginia	Democratic	1895–1975
James Kee	1965–1973	West Virginia	Democratic	1917–1989
John Kee	1933–1951	West Virginia	Democratic	1874–1951
Frank Bateman Keefe	1939–1951	Wisconsin	Republican	1887–1952
Russell W. Keeney	1957–1958	Illinois	Republican	1897–1958
Richard Keese	1827–1829	New York	Democratic	1794–1883
Estes Kefauver	1939–1949	Tennessee	Democratic	1903–1963
James N. Kehoe	1901–1905	Kentucky	Democratic	1862–1945
Walter Kehoe	1917–1919	Florida	Democratic	1870–1938
Edward C. Kehr	1875–1877	Missouri	Democratic	1837–1918
J. Warren Keifer	1877–1885; 1905–1911	Ohio	Republican	1836–1932
Edwin W. Keightley	1877–1879	Michigan	Republican	1843–1926
George M. Keim	1838–1843	Pennsylvania	Democratic	1805–1861
William H. Keim	1858–1859	Pennsylvania	Republican	1813–1862
Abraham Lincoln Keister	1913–1917	Pennsylvania	Republican	1852–1917
Hastings Keith	1959–1973	Massachusetts	Republican	1915–2005
Laurence M. Keitt	1853–1856; 1856–1860	South Carolina	Democratic	1824–1864
John A. Keliher	1903–1911	Massachusetts	Democratic	1866–1938
Fred Keller	2019–2023	Pennsylvania	Republican	1965–present
Kent E. Keller	1931–1941	Illinois	Democratic	1867–1954
Oscar Keller	1919–1927	Minnesota	Republican	1878–1927
Ric Keller	2001–2009	Florida	Republican	1964–present
Augustine B. Kelley	1941–1957	Pennsylvania	Democratic	1883–1957
Harrison Kelley	1889–1891	Kansas	Republican	1836–1897
John Edward Kelley	1897–1899	South Dakota	Populist	1853–1941
Patrick H. Kelley	1913–1923	Michigan	Republican	1867–1925
William D. Kelley	1861–1890	Pennsylvania	Republican	1814–1890
Charles Kellogg	1825–1827	New York	Democratic	1773–1842
Francis William Kellogg	1859–1865	Michigan	Republican	1810–1879
Francis William Kellogg	1868–1869	Alabama	Republican	1810–1879
Orlando Kellogg	1847–1849	New York	Whig	1809–1865
Orlando Kellogg	1863–1865	New York	Republican	1809–1865
Stephen Kellogg	1869–1875	Connecticut	Republican	1822–1904
William Kellogg	1857–1863	Illinois	Republican	1814–1872
William Pitt Kellogg	1883–1885	Louisiana	Republican	1830–1918
Edna F. Kelly	1949–1969	New York	Democratic	1906–1997
Edward A. Kelly	1931–1943; 1945–1947	Illinois	Democratic	1892–1969
George B. Kelly	1937–1939	New York	Democratic	1900–1971
James Kelly	1805–1809	Pennsylvania	Federalist	1760–1819
John Kelly	1855–1858	New York	Democratic	1822–1886
M. Clyde Kelly	1913–1915	Pennsylvania	Republican	1883–1935
M. Clyde Kelly	1917–1919	Pennsylvania	Progressive	1883–1935
M. Clyde Kelly	1919–1935	Pennsylvania	Republican	1883–1935
Richard Kelly	1975–1981	Florida	Republican	1924–2005
Sue Kelly	1995–2007	New York	Republican	1936–present
William H. Kelsey	1855–1857	New York	Oppositionist	1812–1879
William H. Kelsey	1857–1859; 1867–1871	New York	Republican	1812–1879
John R. Kelso	1865–1867	Missouri	Independent Republican	1831–1891
Omer M. Kem	1891–1897	Nebraska	Populist	1855–1942
Gouverneur Kemble	1837–1841	New York	Democratic	1786–1875
Bolivar E. Kemp	1925–1933	Louisiana	Democratic	1871–1933
Jack Kemp	1971–1989	New York	Republican	1935–2009
Thomas Kempshall	1839–1841	New York	Whig	1795/6–1865
Thomas Kenan	1805–1811	North Carolina	Democratic-Republican	1771–1843
Charles West Kendall	1871–1875	Nevada	Democratic	1828–1914
Elva R. Kendall	1929–1931	Kentucky	Republican	1893–1968
John W. Kendall	1891–1892	Kentucky	Democratic	1834–1892
Jonas Kendall	1819–1821	Massachusetts	Federalist	1757–1844
Joseph G. Kendall	1829–1833	Massachusetts	National Republican	1788–1847
Joseph M. Kendall	1892–1893; 1895–1897	Kentucky	Democratic	1863–1933
Nathan E. Kendall	1909–1913	Iowa	Republican	1868–1936
Samuel Austin Kendall	1919–1933	Pennsylvania	Republican	1859–1933
John E. Kenna	1877–1883	West Virginia	Democratic	1848–1893
Ambrose Kennedy	1913–1923	Rhode Island	Republican	1875–1967
Ambrose Jerome Kennedy	1932–1941	Maryland	Democratic	1893–1950
Andrew Kennedy	1841–1847	Indiana	Democratic	1810–1847
Charles A. Kennedy	1907–1921	Iowa	Republican	1869–1951
James Kennedy	1903–1911	Ohio	Republican	1853–1928
John F. Kennedy	1947–1953	Massachusetts	Democratic	1917–1963
John L. Kennedy	1905–1907	Nebraska	Republican	1854–1946
John P. Kennedy	1838–1839; 1841–1845	Maryland	Whig	1795–1870
Joseph P. Kennedy II	1987–1999	Massachusetts	Democratic	1952–present
Joe Kennedy III	2013–2021	Massachusetts	Democratic	1980–present
Mark Kennedy	2001–2007	Minnesota	Republican	1957–present
Martin J. Kennedy	1930–1945	New York	Democratic	1892–1955
Michael J. Kennedy	1939–1943	New York	Democratic	1897–1949
Patrick Kennedy	1995–2011	Rhode Island	Democratic	1967–present
Robert P. Kennedy	1887–1891	Ohio	Republican	1840–1918
William Kennedy	1803–1805; 1809–1811; 1813–1815	North Carolina	Democratic-Republican	1768–1834
William Kennedy	1913–1915	Connecticut	Democratic	1854–1918
Barbara B. Kennelly	1982–1999	Connecticut	Democratic	1936–present
Luther Martin Kennett	1855–1857	Missouri	Oppositionist	1807–1873
Edward A. Kenney	1933–1938	New Jersey	Democratic	1884–1938
William Kennon Jr.	1847–1849	Ohio	Democratic	1802–1867
William Kennon Sr.	1829–1833; 1835–1837	Ohio	Democratic	1793–1881
Everett Kent	1923–1925; 1927–1929	Pennsylvania	Democratic	1888–1963
Joseph Kent	1811–1815; 1819–1825	Maryland	Democratic-Republican	1779–1837
Joseph Kent	1825–1826	Maryland	National Republican	1779–1837
Moss Kent	1813–1817	New York	Federalist	1766–1838
William Kent	1911–1913	California	Progressive Republican	1864–1928
William Kent	1913–1917	California	Independent	1864–1928
William S. Kenyon	1859–1861	New York	Republican	1820–1896
Eugene Keogh	1937–1967	New York	Democratic	1907–1989
Fred J. Kern	1901–1903	Illinois	Democratic	1864–1931
Francis Kernan	1863–1865	New York	Democratic	1816–1892
Brian Kerns	2001–2003	Indiana	Republican	1957–present
Daniel Kerr	1887–1891	Iowa	Republican	1836–1916
James Kerr	1889–1891	Pennsylvania	Democratic	1851–1908
John Kerr	1813–1815; 1815–1817	Virginia	Democratic-Republican	1782–1842
John Bozman Kerr	1849–1851	Maryland	Whig	1809–1878
John H. Kerr	1923–1953	North Carolina	Democratic	1873–1958
John Leeds Kerr	1825–1829; 1831–1833	Maryland	National Republican	1780–1844
John Kerr Jr.	1853–1855	North Carolina	Whig	1811–1879
Josiah Kerr	1900–1901	Maryland	Republican	1861–1920
Michael C. Kerr	1865–1873; 1875–1876	Indiana	Democratic	1827–1876
Winfield S. Kerr	1895–1901	Ohio	Republican	1852–1917
James Kerrigan	1861–1863	New York	Independent Democrat	1828–1899
John Kershaw	1813–1815	South Carolina	Democratic-Republican	1765–1829
Charles J. Kersten	1947–1949; 1951–1955	Wisconsin	Republican	1902–1972
John C. Ketcham	1921–1933	Michigan	Republican	1873–1941
John H. Ketcham	1865–1873; 1877–1893; 1897–1906	New York	Republican	1832–1906
Winthrop Welles Ketcham	1875–1876	Pennsylvania	Republican	1820–1879
William M. Ketchum	1973–1978	California	Republican	1921–1978
William Kettner	1913–1921	California	Democratic	1864–1930
John A. Key	1913–1919	Ohio	Democratic	1871–1954
Philip Key	1791–1793	Maryland	Pro-Administration	1750–1820
Philip Barton Key	1807–1813	Maryland	Federalist	1757–1815
Elias Keyes	1821–1823	Vermont	Democratic-Republican	1758–1844
Martha Keys	1975–1979	Kansas	Democratic	1930–2024
David Kidder	1823–1827	Maine	National Republican	1787–1860
Jefferson P. Kidder	1875–1879	Dakota	Republican	1815–1883
Zedekiah Kidwell	1853–1857	Virginia	Democratic	1814–1872
Andrew Kiefer	1893–1897	Minnesota	Republican	1832–1904
Charles E. Kiefner	1925–1927; 1929–1931	Missouri	Republican	1869–1942
Edgar R. Kiess	1913–1930	Pennsylvania	Republican	1875–1930
Ruben Kihuen	2017–2019	Nevada	Democratic	1980–present
James Kilbourne	1813–1817	Ohio	Democratic-Republican	1770–1850
Clarence E. Kilburn	1940–1965	New York	Republican	1893–1975
Paul J. Kilday	1939–1961	Texas	Democratic	1900–1968
Dale Kildee	1977–2013	Michigan	Democratic	1929–2021
Dan Kildee	2013–2025	Michigan	Democratic	1958–present
Constantine B. Kilgore	1887–1895	Texas	Democratic	1835–1897
Daniel Kilgore	1834–1838	Ohio	Democratic	1793–1851
David Kilgore	1857–1861	Indiana	Republican	1804–1879
Joe M. Kilgore	1955–1965	Texas	Democratic	1918–1999
Joseph Kille	1839–1841	New Jersey	Democratic	1790–1865
John W. Killinger	1859–1863; 1871–1875; 1877–1881	Pennsylvania	Republican	1824–1896
Derek Kilmer	2013–2025	Washington	Democratic	1974–present
Carolyn Cheeks Kilpatrick	1997–2011	Michigan	Democratic	1945–2025
Mary Jo Kilroy	2009–2011	Ohio	Democratic	1949–present
Andy Kim	2019–2024	New Jersey	Democratic	1982–present
Jay Kim	1993–1999	California	Republican	1939–present
Alanson M. Kimball	1875–1877	Wisconsin	Republican	1827–1913
Henry M. Kimball	1935	Michigan	Republican	1878–1935
William P. Kimball	1907–1909	Kentucky	Democratic	1857–1926
William Kimmel	1877–1881	Maryland	Democratic	1812–1886
John Kincaid	1829–1831	Kentucky	Democratic	1791–1873
David Hayes Kincheloe	1915–1930	Kentucky	Democratic	1877–1950
Ron Kind	1997–2023	Wisconsin	Democratic	1963–present
George John Kindel	1913–1915	Colorado	Democratic	1855–1930
Tom Kindness	1975–1987	Ohio	Republican	1929–2004
John J. Kindred	1911–1913; 1921–1929	New York	Democratic	1864–1937
Adam King	1827–1833	Pennsylvania	Democratic	1783–1835
Andrew King	1871–1873	Missouri	Democratic	1812–1895
Austin A. King	1863–1865	Missouri	Unionist	1802–1870
Carleton J. King	1961–1974	New York	Republican	1904–1977
Cecil R. King	1942–1969	California	Democratic	1898–1974
Cyrus King	1813–1817	Massachusetts	Federalist	1772–1817
Daniel P. King	1843–1850	Massachusetts	Whig	1801–1850
David S. King	1959–1963; 1965–1967	Utah	Democratic	1917–2009
Edward John King	1915–1929	Illinois	Republican	1867–1929
George Gordon King	1849–1853	Rhode Island	Whig	1807–1870
Henry King	1831–1835	Pennsylvania	Democratic	1790–1861
J. Floyd King	1879–1887	Louisiana	Democratic	1842–1915
James G. King	1849–1851	New Jersey	Whig	1791–1853
John King	1831–1833	New York	Democratic	1775–1836
John A. King	1849–1851	New York	Whig	1788–1867
Karl C. King	1951–1957	Pennsylvania	Republican	1897–1974
Perkins King	1829–1831	New York	Democratic	1784–1857
Peter King	1993–2021	New York	Republican	1944–present
Preston King	1843–1847	New York	Democratic	1806–1865
Preston King	1849–1853	New York	Free Soiler	1806–1865
Rufus H. King	1855–1857	New York	Oppositionist	1820–1890
Samuel W. King	1935–1943	Hawaii	Republican	1886–1959
Steve King	2003–2021	Iowa	Republican	1949–present
Thomas Butler King	1839–1843; 1845–1850	Georgia	Whig	1800–1864
William H. King	1897–1899; 1900–1901	Utah	Democratic	1863–1949
William R. King	1811–1816	North Carolina	Democratic-Republican	1786–1853
William S. King	1875–1877	Minnesota	Republican	1828–1900
William W. Kingsbury	1857–1858	Minnesota	Republican	1828–1892
Jack Kingston	1993–2015	Georgia	Republican	1955–present
Moses Kinkaid	1903–1922	Nebraska	Republican	1856–1922
Eugene F. Kinkead	1909–1915	New Jersey	Democratic	1876–1960
George L. Kinnard	1833–1836	Indiana	Democratic	1803–1836
John F. Kinney	1863–1865	Utah	Democratic	1816-1902
Thomas Kinsella	1871–1873	New York	Democratic	1832–1884
Charles Kinsey	1817–1819; 1820–1821	New Jersey	Democratic-Republican	1773–1849
William M. Kinsey	1889–1891	Missouri	Republican	1846–1931
Martin Kinsley	1819–1821	Massachusetts	Democratic-Republican	1754–1835
J. Roland Kinzer	1930–1947	Pennsylvania	Republican	1874–1955
Adam Kinzinger	2011–2023	Illinois	Republican	1978–present
George W. Kipp	1907–1909; 1911	Pennsylvania	Democratic	1847–1911
Andrew Jackson Kirk	1926–1927	Kentucky	Republican	1866–1933
Mark Kirk	2001–2010	Illinois	Republican	1959–present
Joseph Kirkland	1821–1823	New York	Federalist	1770–1844
Ann Kirkpatrick	2009–2011; 2013–2017; 2019–2023	Arizona	Democratic	1950–present
Littleton Kirkpatrick	1843–1845	New Jersey	Democratic	1797–1859
Sanford Kirkpatrick	1913–1915	Iowa	Democratic	1842–1932
Snyder S. Kirkpatrick	1895–1897	Kansas	Republican	1848–1909
William Kirkpatrick	1807–1809	New York	Democratic-Republican	1769–1832
William H. Kirkpatrick	1921–1923	Pennsylvania	Republican	1885–1970
William Sebring Kirkpatrick	1897–1899	Pennsylvania	Republican	1844–1932
Dorrance Kirtland	1817–1819	New York	Democratic-Republican	1770–1840
Michael J. Kirwan	1937–1970	Ohio	Democratic	1886–1970
John Kissel	1921–1923	New York	Republican	1864–1938
Larry Kissell	2009–2013	North Carolina	Democratic	1951–present
Aaron Kitchell	1791–1793; 1795	New Jersey	Pro-Administration	1744–1820
Aaron Kitchell	1795–1797	New Jersey	Federalist	1744–1820
Aaron Kitchell	1799–1801	New Jersey	Democratic-Republican	1744–1820
Bethuel Kitchen	1867–1869	West Virginia	Republican	1812–1895
Wade H. Kitchens	1937–1941	Arkansas	Democratic	1878–1966
Alvin Paul Kitchin	1957–1963	North Carolina	Democratic	1908–1983
Claude Kitchin	1901–1923	North Carolina	Democratic	1869–1923
William H. Kitchin	1879–1881	North Carolina	Democratic	1837–1901
William Walton Kitchin	1897–1909	North Carolina	Democratic	1866–1924
John W. Kittera	1791–1795	Pennsylvania	Pro-Administration	1752–1801
John W. Kittera	1795–1801	Pennsylvania	Federalist	1752–1801
Thomas Kittera	1826–1827	Pennsylvania	National Republican	1789–1839
George W. Kittredge	1853–1855	New Hampshire	Democratic	1805–1881
Richard M. Kleberg	1931–1945	Texas	Democratic	1887–1955
Rudolph Kleberg	1896–1903	Texas	Democratic	1847–1924
Jerry Kleczka	1984–2005	Wisconsin	Democratic	1943–2017
John C. Kleczka	1919–1923	Wisconsin	Republican	1885–1959
Arthur G. Klein	1941–1945; 1946–1956	New York	Democratic	1904–1968
Herb Klein	1993–1995	New Jersey	Democratic	1930–2023
Ron Klein	2007–2011	Florida	Democratic	1957–present
John J. Kleiner	1883–1887	Indiana	Democratic	1845–1911
Thomas S. Kleppe	1967–1971	North Dakota	Republican	1919–2007
Frank B. Klepper	1905–1907	Missouri	Republican	1864–1933
Ardolph L. Kline	1921–1923	New York	Republican	1858–1930
I. Clinton Kline	1921–1923	Pennsylvania	Republican	1858–1947
John Kline	2003–2017	Minnesota	Republican	1947–present
Marcus C.L. Kline	1903–1907	Pennsylvania	Democratic	1855–1911
John Klingensmith Jr.	1835–1839	Pennsylvania	Democratic	1786–1854
Ron Klink	1993–2001	Pennsylvania	Democratic	1951–present
Frank Le Blond Kloeb	1933–1937	Ohio	Democratic	1890–1976
Robert Klotz	1879–1883	Pennsylvania	Democratic	1819–1895
John C. Kluczynski	1951–1975	Illinois	Democratic	1896–1975
Scott L. Klug	1991–1999	Wisconsin	Republican	1953–present
Theodore F. Kluttz	1899–1905	North Carolina	Democratic	1848–1918
Anthony L. Knapp	1861–1865	Illinois	Democratic	1828–1881
Charles Knapp	1869–1871	New York	Republican	1797–1880
Charles J. Knapp	1889–1891	New York	Republican	1845–1916
Charles L. Knapp	1901–1911	New York	Republican	1847–1929
Chauncey L. Knapp	1855–1857	Massachusetts	American	1809–1898
Chauncey L. Knapp	1857–1859	Massachusetts	Republican	1809–1898
Robert M. Knapp	1873–1875; 1877–1879	Illinois	Democratic	1831–1889
Herman Knickerbocker	1809–1811	New York	Federalist	1779–1855
Frank C. Kniffin	1931–1939	Ohio	Democratic	1894–1968
C. L. Knight	1921–1923	Ohio	Republican	1867–1933
Jonathan Knight	1855–1857	Pennsylvania	Oppositionist	1787–1858
Nehemiah Knight	1803–1808	Rhode Island	Democratic-Republican	1746–1808
Steve Knight	2015–2019	California	Republican	1966–present
Joe Knollenberg	1993–2009	Michigan	Republican	1933–2018
Philip Knopf	1903–1909	Illinois	Republican	1847–1920
J. Proctor Knott	1867–1871; 1875–1883	Kentucky	Democratic	1830–1911
Joseph R. Knowland	1903–1914	California	Republican	1873–1966
Freeman Knowles	1897–1899	South Dakota	Populist	1846–1910
Ebenezer Knowlton	1855–1857	Maine	Oppositionist	1815–1874
James Knox	1853–1855	Illinois	Whig	1807–1876
James Knox	1855–1857	Illinois	Oppositionist	1807–1876
Samuel Knox	1864–1865	Missouri	Unconditional Unionist	1815–1905
Victor A. Knox	1953–1965	Michigan	Republican	1899–1976
William S. Knox	1895–1903	Massachusetts	Republican	1843–1914
Coya Knutson	1955–1959	Minnesota	Democratic-Farmer-Labor	1912–1996
Harold Knutson	1917–1949	Minnesota	Republican	1880–1953
Ed Koch	1969–1977	New York	Democratic	1924–2013
Leo Kocialkowski	1933–1943	Illinois	Democratic	1882–1958
Ray Kogovsek	1979–1985	Colorado	Democratic	1941–2017
Jim Kolbe	1985–2007	Arizona	Republican	1942–2022
Joseph P. Kolter	1983–1993	Pennsylvania	Democratic	1926–2019
George Konig	1911–1913	Maryland	Democratic	1856–1913
Ernie Konnyu	1987–1989	California	Republican	1937–present
Thomas F. Konop	1911–1917	Wisconsin	Democratic	1879–1964
William H. Koontz	1866–1869	Pennsylvania	Republican	1830–1911
Mike Kopetski	1991–1995	Oregon	Democratic	1949–present
Arthur W. Kopp	1909–1913	Wisconsin	Republican	1874–1967
William F. Kopp	1921–1933	Iowa	Republican	1869–1938
Herman P. Kopplemann	1933–1939; 1941–1943; 1945–1947	Connecticut	Democratic	1880–1957
Charles A. Korbly	1909–1915	Indiana	Democratic	1871–1937
Franklin F. Korell	1927–1931	Oregon	Republican	1889–1965
Horace R. Kornegay	1961–1969	North Carolina	Democratic	1924–2009
Suzanne Kosmas	2009–2011	Florida	Democratic	1944–present
Peter H. Kostmayer	1977–1981; 1983–1993	Pennsylvania	Democratic	1946–present
Frank Kowalski	1959–1963	Connecticut	Democratic	1907–1974
Charles Kramer	1933–1943	California	Democratic	1879–1943
Ken Kramer	1979–1987	Colorado	Republican	1942–present
Frank Kratovil	2009–2011	Maryland	Democratic	1968–present
Milton Kraus	1917–1923	Indiana	Republican	1866–1942
Jacob Krebs	1826–1827	Pennsylvania	Democratic	1782–1847
John Hans Krebs	1975–1979	California	Democratic	1926–2014
Paul J. Krebs	1965–1967	New Jersey	Democratic	1912–1996
Aaron S. Kreider	1913–1923	Pennsylvania	Republican	1863–1929
Mike Kreidler	1993–1995	Washington	Democratic	1943–present
George Kremer	1823–1825	Pennsylvania	Democratic-Republican	1775–1854
George Kremer	1825–1829	Pennsylvania	Democratic	1775–1854
George F. Kribbs	1891–1895	Pennsylvania	Democratic	1846–1938
John Kronmiller	1909–1911	Maryland	Republican	1858–1928
Bob Krueger	1975–1979	Texas	Democratic	1935–2022
Otto Krueger	1953–1959	North Dakota	Republican	1890–1963
Edward H. Kruse	1949–1951	Indiana	Democratic	1918–2000
Dennis Kucinich	1997–2013	Ohio	Democratic	1946–present
Randy Kuhl	2005–2009	New York	Republican	1943–present
Joseph Henry Kuhns	1851–1853	Pennsylvania	Whig	1800–1883
Monroe H. Kulp	1895–1899	Pennsylvania	Republican	1858–1911
Jacob M. Kunkel	1857–1861	Maryland	Democratic	1822–1870
John C. Kunkel	1939–1951; 1961–1966	Pennsylvania	Republican	1898–1970
John Christian Kunkel	1855–1857	Pennsylvania	Oppositionist	1816–1870
John Christian Kunkel	1857–1859	Pennsylvania	Republican	1816–1870
Stanley H. Kunz	1921–1931; 1932–1933	Illinois	Democratic	1864–1946
Theodore R. Kupferman	1966–1969	New York	Republican	1920–2003
J. Banks Kurtz	1923–1935	Pennsylvania	Republican	1867–1960
William H. Kurtz	1851–1855	Pennsylvania	Democratic	1804–1868
Annie Kuster	2013–2025	New Hampshire	Democratic	1956–present
Gustav Küstermann	1907–1911	Wisconsin	Republican	1850–1919
Andrew J. Kuykendall	1865–1867	Illinois	Republican	1815–1891
Dan Kuykendall	1967–1975	Tennessee	Republican	1924–2008
Steven T. Kuykendall	1999–2001	California	Republican	1947–2021
Ole J. Kvale	1923–1929	Minnesota	Farmer-Labor	1869–1929
Paul J. Kvale	1929–1939	Minnesota	Farmer-Labor	1896–1960
John Henry Kyl	1959–1965; 1967–1973	Iowa	Republican	1919–2002
Jon Kyl	1987–1995	Arizona	Republican	1942–2026
John C. Kyle	1891–1897	Mississippi	Democratic	1851–1913
Thomas B. Kyle	1901–1905	Ohio	Republican	1856–1915
Peter Kyros	1967–1975	Maine	Democratic	1925–2012
