= Leonidas J. Moore =

American lawyer and state senator in North Carolina

Leonidas J. Moore was an American lawyer and state senator in North Carolina. He represented Craven County and Carteret County. He was a lawyer in New Bern.

After 20 years as a Republican, Moore became a Democrat. He objected to legislation promoted by Republicans in the U.S. Congress, describing it as anti-Southern.

He gave testimony about African American officials in judicial and police roles handling matters involving white people. He was a bankruptcy referee.

== See also ==
- Orlando Hubbs
- James E. O'Hara
