= Curtis Hooks Brogden =

American politician (1816–1901)

42nd Governor of North Carolina
- In office July 11, 1874 – January 1, 1877
- Preceded by: Tod R. Caldwell
- Succeeded by: Zebulon Baird Vance

2nd Lieutenant Governor of North Carolina
- In office 1873 – July 1874
- Governor: Tod R. Caldwell
- Preceded by: Tod R. Caldwell
- Succeeded by: Thomas J. Jarvis

Member of the U.S. House of Representatives from North Carolina's 2nd district
- In office March 4, 1877 – March 3, 1879
- Preceded by: John A. Hyman
- Succeeded by: William H. Kitchin

Member of the North Carolina House of Commons
- In office 1839–1851

Personal details
- Born: Curtis Hooks Brogden; November 6, 1816 Wayne County, North Carolina, U.S.
- Died: January 5, 1901 (aged 84) Goldsboro, North Carolina, U.S.
- Resting place: Willowdale Cemetery in Goldsboro
- Party: Republican (from 1867)
- Other political affiliations: Democratic (until 1867)
- Profession: Farmer, Lawyer, Politician

Military service
- Allegiance: United States; Confederate States
- Branch/service: North Carolina State Militia
- Rank: Major general
- Battles/wars: American Civil War

Curtis Hooks Brogden (November 6, 1816 – January 5, 1901) was an American farmer, attorney and politician who served as the 42nd governor of the U.S. state of North Carolina from 1874 to 1877 during the Reconstruction era. He succeeded to the position after the death of Governor Tod R. Caldwell, after having been elected as the 2nd lieutenant governor of the state on the Republican ticket in 1872.

Brogden had a long political career, first elected to state office in 1838 at the age of 22. Building a close friendship with editor William Woods Holden of the North Carolina Standard, he served nearly without a break in various state offices and lastly as US Congressman, until essentially retiring from politics in 1878. He was elected to one more term in the state legislature in 1886.

== Early life and education ==
He was born on November 6, 1816, in the Brogden family home ten miles southwest of Goldsboro, North Carolina, the son of a yeoman farmer. The Brogdens were Quakers of English descent and came to old Dobbs County during the colonial period. Although he attended the local district schools, like most North Carolina farm boys of his generation, his opportunity for higher education was limited, but Brogden was an auto-didact, learning by his own studies.

== Military service ==
His father Pierce Brogden was a veteran of the War of 1812, and his grandfather, Thomas Brogden, served in the Continental Army during the American Revolution. Brogden continued the family tradition of military service and joined the North Carolina state militia at the age of 18. He was elected captain at his second muster, and eventually rose to the rank of major general. During the Civil War he served the Confederate cause although he never held a field command due to his position in the North Carolina state government that kept him in Raleigh for the duration of the conflict.

== Political career ==
First elected to the North Carolina House of Commons in 1838 as a Jacksonian Democrat, Brogden was its youngest member at age 22. He became known as the "Eloquent Plowboy from Wayne" and served in the House until 1851 where he was the longtime chairman of the House Finance Committee. In 1838, he was also elected as Wayne County Justice of the Peace, a position he held for 20 consecutive years. Brogden studied law and was admitted to the bar in 1845 but never seriously undertook the practice of law.

In 1852, Brogden was elected to the North Carolina Senate, where he served until 1857. That year he was elected by the General Assembly as State Comptroller, a post he held for ten years. He continued in office through the crises of secession, Civil War, and emancipation. During these decades he formed a political alliance with Holden who as the Civil War dragged on became a quiet critic of the Confederate government, a leader of the North Carolina peace movement, and was ultimately appointed governor of North Carolina by President Andrew Johnson in 1865 for a brief term and then elected in 1868.

=== Support of Black suffrage ===
After the Civil War, Radical Republicans in Congress were not content with President Johnson's moderate approach for reconstruction. Concerned that Southern states passed Black Codes restricting freedmen, they passed the Military Reconstruction Acts to temporarily replace state governments and try to remake the societies to incorporate full emancipation of African-American slaves, establish free labor and other rights of citizens for blacks. The Act stipulated that the former Confederate states had to include Negro male suffrage in their new constitutions.

These measures were opposed by most whites in the South, although North Carolina had extended the franchise to free blacks before rescinding it in 1835, following Nat Turner's slave rebellion. In North Carolina before the war, blacks made up about one-third of the population of the state, with a majority in the coastal areas and near parity in some Piedmont counties. Wilmington had had the largest proportion and number of free blacks before the war. Due to his Quaker beliefs, Brogden supported extending the franchise.

=== Switch to the Republican Party ===
Brogden followed Holden into the Republican Party after the war. His change of parties and support of negro suffrage shocked his ex-Confederate friends who opposed allowing blacks to vote and because the Republican Party in North Carolina was at the time dominated by carpetbaggers, freedmen and scalawags.

He briefly left the Senate in 1867 after being elected to represent Wayne County at a state constitutional convention. In 1868 he was elected to the State Senate as a Republican, serving for three terms. He also was a member of the Electoral College supporting Republican, Ulysses S. Grant. In 1870 he was appointed as a U.S. Collector of Internal Revenue. He supported Holden as governor and voted in the state legislature against his impeachment.

In 1872, he was elected on the Republican ticket as lieutenant governor with Tod R. Caldwell. When Gov. Caldwell died in office in 1874, Brogden succeeded to the position of governor. By then, white Democrats had regained control of the state legislature, in part by a program of suppression of black voting carried out by the Red Shirts.

=== Governorship ===
During his term as governor, Brogden made a stronger attempt to work with the Democrats who controlled the legislature than his Republican predecessors, and focused on railroad construction and higher education. He worked diligently to re-open the University of North Carolina at Chapel Hill, where he had been an appointed trustee from 1869 to 1872. Brogden also called for founding a college for blacks. While making efforts to lower the state debt, he supported construction of a state penitentiary as a public good. During his tenure as governor, the federal government completed the Currituck Beach Lighthouse to light the last remaining dark stretch of coastline along North Carolina's Outer Banks, long known as the Graveyard of the Atlantic in 1875. In 1876, Governor Brogden represented North Carolina at the Centennial Exposition in Philadelphia.

While serving as governor, Brogden was elected in 1876 as a Republican to the United States House of Representatives from North Carolina's 2nd congressional district, which was a predominately black Republican stronghold in the Piedmont area. In Congress. He worked to gain internal improvements for his state and reduced internal revenue taxes. He also advocated direct presidential elections and pensions for Mexican War veterans. His vote with the Democratic majority for the U.S. Army reorganization bill was unpopular with his Republican constituents.

Brogden served one term and was not re-nominated in 1878, a year of intense rivalry among second district Republicans. Amid charges of fraud, the Democrats narrowly elected their nominee, William H. Kitchin. Two years later, Brogden tried to regain his seat in Congress. After many Republicans disputed the outcome of the turbulent convention, he issued a broadside declaring himself an independent candidate against the convention nominee, Northern immigrant Orlando Hubbs. Brogden called for reduction in the tariff and other taxes and accused Hubbs of not representing the interests of the South. But his efforts collapsed when Republicans closed ranks in response to the entry of a third Democratic candidate into the race. Wayne County was redistricted to the Third Congressional District before Brogden’s next campaign for Congress. In 1884, Brogden was nominated, only to be defeated in the general election by Wharton J. Green, a Democrat.

=== Later political career ===
After losing the congressional election in 1884, Brogden essentially retired from public life with the exception of a single term, in 1887, representing Wayne County in the North Carolina House of Representatives. In a House controlled by Republicans and independents, he spoke in favor of changing the centralized, indirect system of county government the Democrats had instituted ten years before in order to “save” Eastern North Carolina from “Negro rule.” The House passed a bill changing the system, but the Senate rejected it. Brogden was not re-elected in 1888. By then one of the largest landowners in Wayne County, Brogden devoted himself to farming.

Brogden's goal of establishing a college for blacks was finally realized more than a decade after he left the governor's office. On March 7, 1887, The North Carolina General Assembly founded North Carolina State University as a land-grant college under the name "North Carolina College of Agriculture and Mechanic Arts." In the segregated system, it was open only to white students. Under terms of the Second Morrill Act, in 1890 states were required to have colleges available to all races of students. In order to qualify for the land grants, North Carolina in 1891 established qualifying programs at what became North Carolina Agricultural and Technical State University, a historically black college, first as part of Shaw Collegiate Institute in Raleigh.

Brogden, a lifelong bachelor, died on January 5, 1901, in his hometown of Goldsboro, North Carolina and is buried there in Willowdale Cemetery.

== Family ==
Brogden's younger brother Willis H. Brogden (1839-1922) was convicted of murder in 1892 following a dispute over the shooting of one of Willis's cows that led to the death of one of his neighbors. Willis claimed he struck the man, who died of his injuries weeks later, in the head with a billy club in self defense after being attacked with a knife. Despite numerous witnesses who attested to Willis's excellent character and three of the twelve jurors being potentially compromised in his favor (two were related to the defendant by marriage, and one had previously stated that he believed the accused was innocent) Willis was found guilty of manslaughter. After he was sentenced to six years in the penitentiary, counsel moved to appeal the case and Willis was released from jail on $5000.00 bond (equal to approximately $140,000.00 in 2019) provided by ex-Governor Brogden. Willis received a somewhat controversial pardon from Governor Holt in 1893.

Brogden's nephew Willis J. Brogden (1877-1935), son of Willis H., was a prominent attorney who served as mayor of Durham from 1911 to 1915. He became a judge in 1925, when Governor McLean appointed him associate justice of the North Carolina Supreme Court to fill the unexpired term of Judge L. R. Varser. He was elected to a full term on November 6, 1928, and served on the court until his death in 1935.

Another of Brogden's nephews, L. Cramner Brogden, was superintendent of public schools in Kinston in the early 1900s and later served as state supervisor of rural education for North Carolina.

== Legacy and Honors ==
Brogden Middle School in Wayne County is named for Governor Brogden.

A North Carolina historical marker marks the site of Brogden's home along US 13 southwest of Goldsboro.

Party political offices
Preceded by Tod Robinson Caldwell	Republican nominee for Lieutenant Governor of North Carolina; 1872	Succeeded by William Alexander Smith
Political offices
Preceded by Tod R. Caldwell	Lieutenant Governor of North Carolina; 1873–1874	Succeeded by Thomas J. Jarvis
Preceded by Tod R. Caldwell	Governor of North Carolina; July 11, 1874 – January 1, 1877	Succeeded by Zebulon B. Vance
U.S. House of Representatives
Preceded by John A. Hyman	Member of the U.S. House of Representatives from North Carolina's 2nd congressional district 1877–1879	Succeeded by William H. Kitchin
