= Charles R. Thomas (1827–1891) =

American politician

Charles Randolph Thomas (February 7, 1827 – February 18, 1891), was an American attorney and politician who served two terms as a U.S. representative from North Carolina during the Reconstruction era.

He was the father of Charles R. Thomas (1861-1931), also a politician.

== Early life and education ==
Thomas was born in Beaufort, NC, February 7, 1827. He attended a private school in Hillsboro, North Carolina (there was no public education). He was graduated from the University of North Carolina at Chapel Hill in 1849. He studied law, and was admitted to the bar in 1850.

== Career ==
He started a practice in Beaufort and moved to New Bern. He also became involved in politics and was elected as a member of the State constitutional convention in 1861 to set up the new Confederate state.

He was appointed as North Carolina Secretary of State from 1864 to 1865. After the war, he was appointed by the Governor as president of the Atlantic & North Carolina Railroad in 1867. He became a judge of the superior court from 1868 to 1870.

=== Congress ===
Thomas was elected from North Carolina's 2nd congressional district as a Republican to the Forty-second and Forty-third Congresses (March 4, 1871 – March 3, 1875). He was an unsuccessful candidate for Republican renomination in 1874, losing to John A. Hyman, the first African American elected to Congress from the state.

=== Later career and death ===
Thomas returned to his law practice in New Bern. He died there February 18, 1891.

== Notes ==
- Congressional Biographical Directory

Political offices
Preceded by John P. H. Russ	Secretary of State of North Carolina; 1864–1865	Succeeded by Robert W. Best
U.S. House of Representatives
Preceded by Joseph Dixon	Member of the U.S. House of Representatives from North Carolina's 2nd congressional district 1871–1875	Succeeded by John A. Hyman
