= A. Paul Kitchin =

American politician

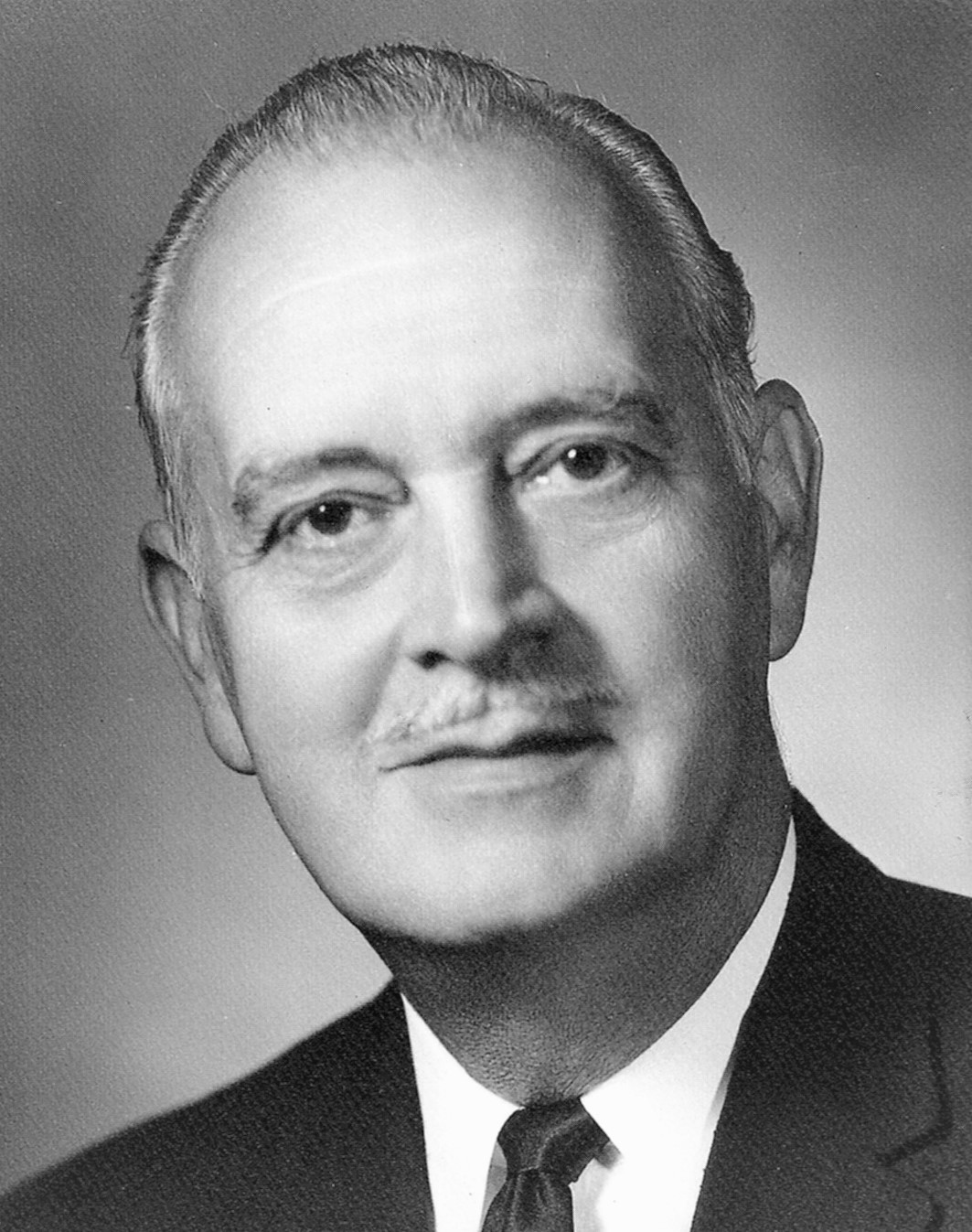

Member of the U.S. House of Representatives from North Carolina's 8th district
- In office January 3, 1957 – January 3, 1963
- Preceded by: Charles B. Deane
- Succeeded by: Charles R. Jonas

Personal details
- Born: Alvin Paul Kitchin; September 13, 1908 Scotland Neck, North Carolina
- Died: October 22, 1983 (aged 75) Wadesboro, North Carolina
- Party: Democratic
- Spouse: Dora Bennett Little
- Parent: A. Paul Kitchin Sr. (father)
- Education: Wake Forest College
- Occupation: Attorney

Alvin Paul Kitchin (September 13, 1908 – October 22, 1983) was a U.S. Congressional representative from North Carolina.

== Early life ==
Kitchin was born in Scotland Neck, North Carolina, in 1908, the grandson of former congressman William H. Kitchin and the nephew of congressman Claude Kitchin and of North Carolina Governor William Walton Kitchin. At the time of Kitchin's birth, his father, A. Paul Kitchin Sr., was serving as a member of North Carolina House of Representatives. He was educated in the public schools; attended Oak Ridge Military Academy 1923–1925; graduated from Wake Forest College Law School in 1930; was admitted to the bar in 1930 and commenced the practice of law in Scotland Neck.

== Wartime career with FBI ==
Beginning in 1933, he worked for the Federal Bureau of Investigation. He served as special-agent-in-charge of the FBI's offices in several major cities, including Newark, NJ, New Orleans, LA, and Dallas, TX. He retired from the FBI in August 1945, and then resumed the practice of law in Wadesboro, North Carolina, his wife's hometown.

== Service in U.S. House of Representatives ==
In 1956, Kitchin was elected as a Democrat to the 85th Congress following the local party's rebuke of Charles B. Deane as a result of his refusal to sign the Southern Manifesto. Kitchin was selected for his strong support of the Southern Manifesto.

Kitchin was subsequently re-elected to the 86th Congress (January 3, 1959 - January 3, 1961) and the 87th Congress. In 1962, his Republican colleague Charles R. Jonas ran for re-election in the 8th district as a result of redistricting, and defeated Kitchin.

Kitchin resumed the practice of law and was a resident of Wadesboro, North Carolina, until his death there on October 22, 1983. He is buried at East View Cemetery in Wadesboro.

U.S. House of Representatives
Preceded by Charles B. Deane	Member of the U.S. House of Representatives from North Carolina's 8th congressional district 1957–1963	Succeeded by Charles R. Jonas
