= Willis J. Brogden =

American judge (1877–1935)

Associate Justice of the North Carolina Supreme Court
- In office January 2, 1926 – October 29, 1935
- Appointed by: Angus Wilton McLean
- Preceded by: Lycurgus R. Varser
- Succeeded by: William A. Devin

Mayor of Durham, North Carolina
- In office 1911–1915
- Preceded by: W. J. Griswold
- Succeeded by: Benjamin S. Skinner

Personal details
- Born: October 18, 1877 Goldsboro, North Carolina, U.S.
- Died: October 29, 1935 (aged 58)
- Relatives: Curtis Hooks Brogden (uncle)
- Education: University of North Carolina; Trinity College
- Occupation: lawyer, politician, judge

Willis J. Brogden (October 18, 1877 – October 29, 1935) was a justice of the North Carolina Supreme Court from 1926 to 1935.

Born in Goldsboro, North Carolina, Brogden graduated from the University of North Carolina in 1898 and taught at the Fuller School in that city before moving to Durham, North Carolina, in 1901. Brogden continued teaching while reading law and taking night classes at Trinity University (now Duke University) to gain admission to the bar in 1907, after which he practiced law in several firms in Durham from 1907 to 1926. He was elected Mayor of Durham in 1911, serving two terms in that office.

In December 1925, Governor Angus Wilton McLean appointed Brogden to a seat on the North Carolina Supreme Court vacated by the resignation of Lycurgus R. Varser. Brogden was sworn in on January 2, 1926, and was reelected to the court in every subsequent election, continuing in office until his sudden illness and death in 1935. At the time of his death, he had expressed that he anticipated easily winning reelection in 1936.

Brogden was a nephew of North Carolina Governor, Curtis Hooks Brogden.

Political offices
Preceded by Lycurgus R. Varser	Justice of the North Carolina Supreme Court; 1926–1935	Succeeded by William A. Devin
