= Thurman D. Kitchin =

American college president (1885–1955)

Thurman D. Kitchin FACP
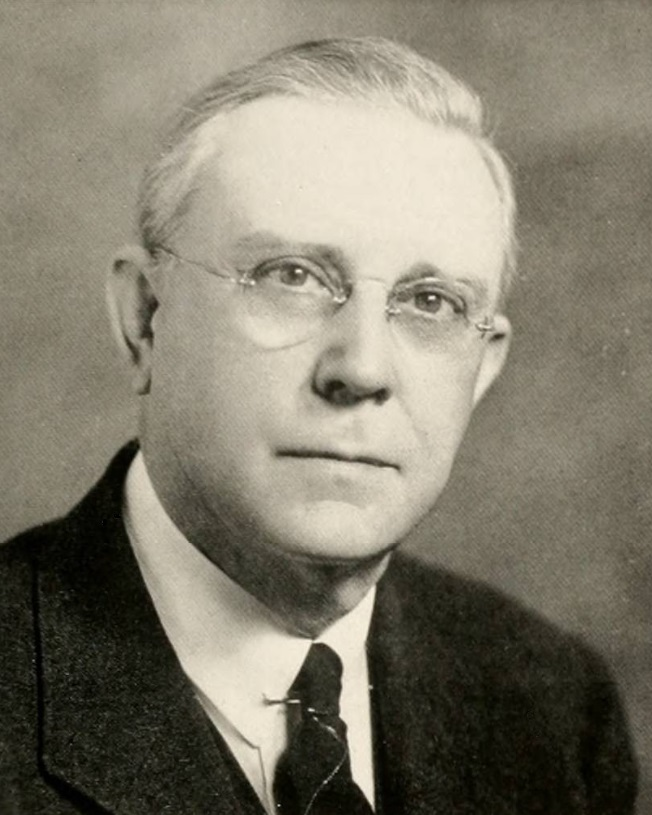
- Portrait of Kitchin, c. 1939

9th President of Wake Forest University (Note: During Kitchin's tenure, the school had yet to adopt its current name and was known contemporaneously as "Wake Forest College".)
- In office 1930–1950
- Preceded by: Francis Pendleton Gaines
- Succeeded by: Harold W. Tribble

Personal details
- Born: Thurman Delna Kitchin; October 17, 1885 Scotland Neck, North Carolina, United States
- Died: August 28, 1955 (aged 69) Wake Forest, North Carolina, United States
- Parent: William H. Kitchin (father)
- Relatives: W. W. Kitchin (brother); Claude Kitchin (brother); A. Paul Kitchin Sr. (brother)
- Education: Wake Forest College (AB); Jefferson Medical College (MD)
- Occupation: Physician; educator; academic administrator

Thurman Delna Kitchin (October 17, 1885 – August 28, 1955) was an American physician, educator, and academic administrator.

== Life ==
Born in Scotland Neck, North Carolina, Kitchin obtained his A.B. degree from Wake Forest College in 1905 and his M.D. from Jefferson Medical College in 1908. He practiced medicine in Lumberton and Scotland Neck before joining Wake Forest College's School of Medicine as a professor of physiology and pharmacology in 1917. Kitchin became the Dean in 1919 and played a significant role in establishing and moving the medical school from Wake Forest to Winston-Salem. In 1930, he was elected president of Wake Forest College, a role he held until 1950. Under Kitchin's leadership, the college expanded, admitting women as undergraduates and introducing a four-year program in the Medical School. He also served on various state committees and boards, was president of the Southern Medical Association, and authored several books on medicine and citizenship.

Kitchin Residence Hall, overlooking Wake Forest University's Upper Quad, is named for him.
