= James E. O'Hara =

American politician

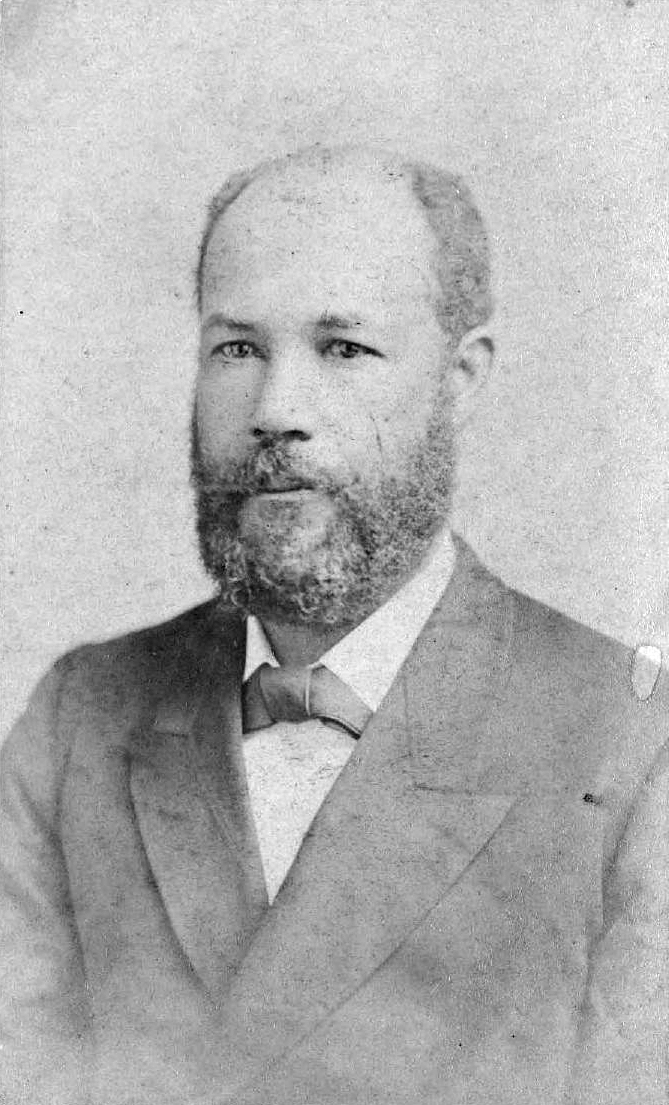
- Portrait by Rice Studio, 1883

Member of the U.S. House of Representatives from North Carolina's 2nd district
- In office March 4, 1883 – March 3, 1887
- Preceded by: Orlando Hubbs
- Succeeded by: Furnifold M. Simmons

Member of the North Carolina House of Representatives
- In office 1868–1869

Personal details
- Born: February 26, 1844 New York City, U.S.
- Died: September 15, 1905 (aged 61) New Bern, North Carolina, U.S.
- Party: Republican
- Profession: Lawyer

James Edward O'Hara (February 26, 1844 – September 15, 1905) was an American politician and attorney who in 1882, after the Reconstruction era, was the second African American to be elected to Congress from North Carolina. He was born in New York City to parents of mixed-race West Indian and Irish ancestry and was raised in the West Indies. As a young man, he traveled to the southern United States after the American Civil War with religious missionaries from the African Methodist Episcopal Zion Church, an independent black denomination, to help freedmen establish independent lives and new congregations. O'Hara became active in politics, being elected as a Republican to local and state offices.

O'Hara passed the bar in North Carolina in 1873 and started a law practice there. In 1878, he ran for Congress and won, but his white opponent was ruled the winner by corrupt public officials. In 1882, O'Hara was elected as a Republican member of the United States House of Representatives from North Carolina's 2nd congressional district, where there was a black majority. He served two terms. After being defeated in the 1886 election, he returned to his law practice.

== Early life and education ==
James O'Hara was born in New York City on February 26, 1844. His mother was West Indian (likely of mixed race), and his father was an Irish American merchant. Soon after James was born, his parents moved the family to the West Indies, where they lived into the 1850s before returning to New York.

== Career in North Carolina ==
After the American Civil War, O'Hara moved to North Carolina with missionaries of the African Methodist Episcopal Zion Church, an independent black denomination founded in New York City. It was seeking to aid freedmen and to plant new congregations of the independent church in the South.

During his early years in North Carolina, he "read the law" as a legal apprentice. O'Hara was admitted to the North Carolina bar in 1873 as the third black lawyer in the state and returned to Enfield, North Carolina, to start his law practice. He also started becoming involved in politics.

== Political career ==
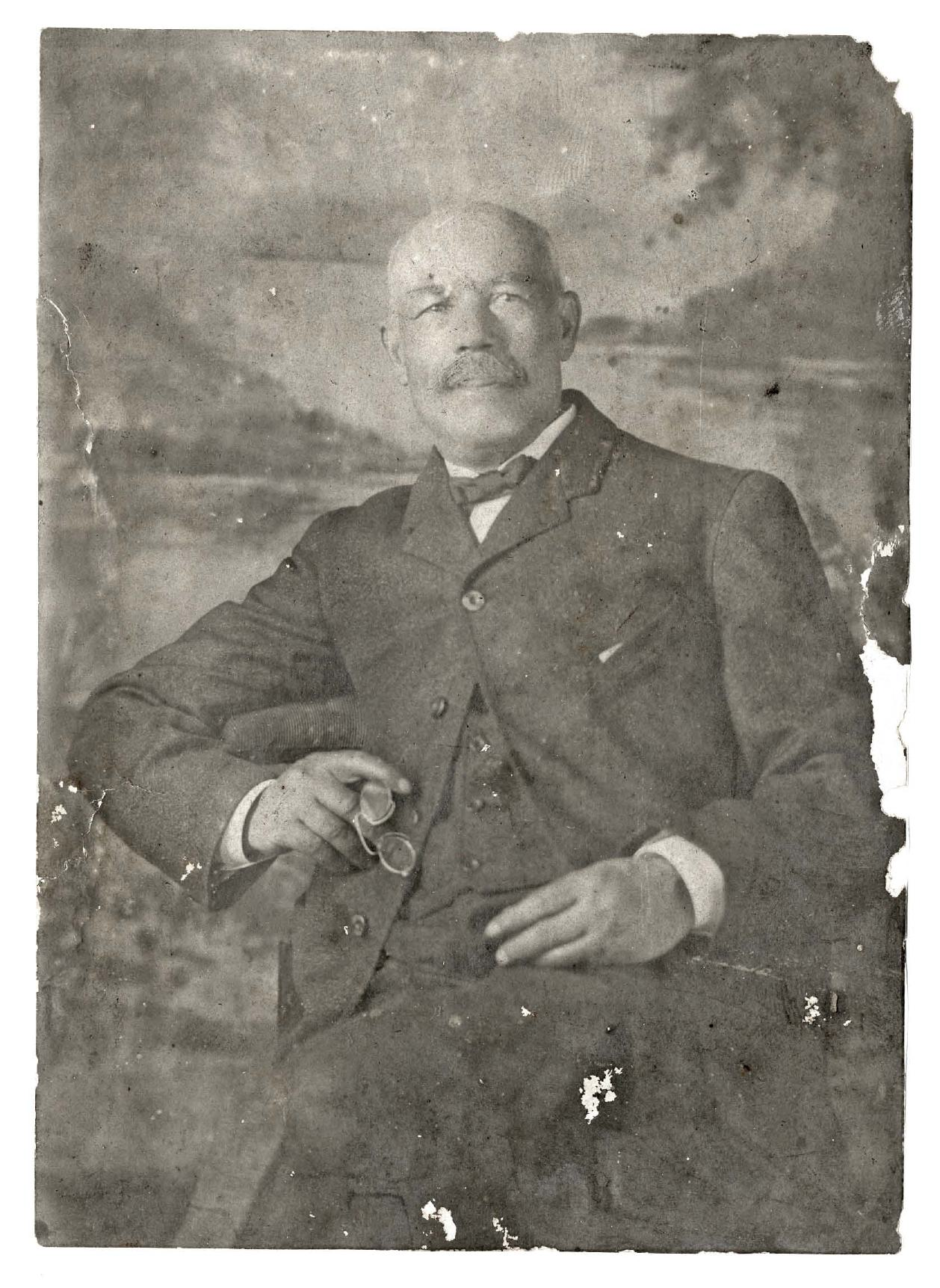
O'Hara c. 1900–1905

After serving as a delegate and a clerk for the 1868 state convention that drafted a new state constitution, O'Hara—a Republican—served in the North Carolina House of Representatives from 1868 to 1869. In 1873, he was elected chairman of the Halifax County board of commissioners. He served in that capacity for four years. Halifax and nearby counties of the northeast part of the state had black majorities, and were included within North Carolina's 2nd congressional district. By 1877, New Bern—the major population center in the area—was a black-majority city. O'Hara was a delegate to the state constitutional convention of 1875, where he represented Halifax County.

O'Hara competed for the congressional seat from the 2nd District numerous times. When he ran for Congress in 1878, he was accused of bigamy. If true, this accusation would have rendered him ineligible to serve in Congress. O'Hara denied the charge and maintained that he had obtained a legal divorce from his first wife without her knowledge. The Republican executive committee refused to accept his account and pulled him from the congressional race, calling for a second convention less than three weeks before the election.

At the next convention, O'Hara nearly earned his nomination back, but the Democrats accused him of not being a United States citizen. (As of November 1867, Wayne County records showed O'Hara to be a native of the Virgin Islands. O'Hara stated that he had taken preliminary steps to become naturalized, but had never completed the process as he learned he was born in New York City.) While the Republicans opted to nominate James H. Harris (a white candidate), O'Hara remained in the race and won the election. However, when the votes were "counted," many of his votes were thrown out, allowing his Democratic opponent, "Buck" Kitchin, to prevail. The New York Times called the election "pure Democratic villainy," as it was widely known that Democrats sent a telegram to Tarboro stating that if O'Hara received less than a 1,000 vote majority in Egdecombe County, Kitchin would win. O'Hara contested the results, but evidence was destroyed when his house burned down amid suspicious circumstances. His court challenges to the election results failed. O'Hara ran unsuccessfully for Congress once again in 1880.

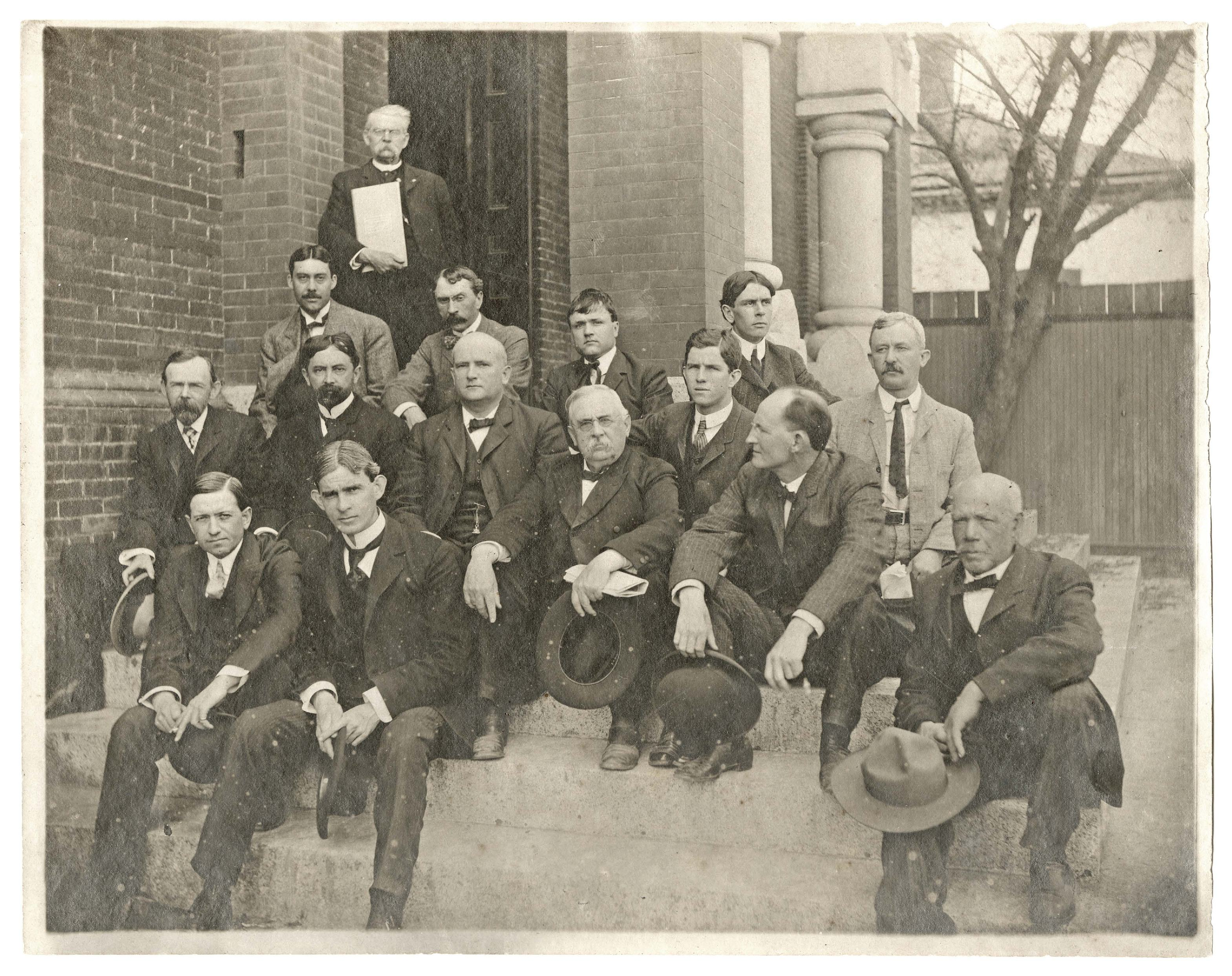
O'Hara (seated, far right) among members of the New Bern Bar Association, June 15, 1905

In 1882, O'Hara was elected to Congress from North Carolina's 2nd congressional district. He served in the Forty-eighth Congress and was re-elected to the Forty-ninth Congress, serving from March 4, 1883 - March 3, 1887. He was the second African American (after John A. Hyman) to be elected to Congress from North Carolina and was the first to be elected following the end of the Reconstruction era. While in Congress, O’Hara served on the Mines and Mining Committee, the Expenditures on Public Buildings Committee, and the Invalid Pensions Committee. He was known for making short speeches and fighting for the rights of African Americans. He proposed a constitutional amendment to require equal accommodations for African Americans on public transportation and proposed legislation to reinstate the 1875 Civil Rights Bill.

Although O'Hara influenced the Interstate Commerce Act of 1887, asserting that Congress could regulate passenger cars as well as freight traffic, he was unable to gain language requiring enforcement of integrated passenger seating for the railroads. Congress allowed a loophole permitting segregated seating, although the railroads' interstate transportation was under federal oversight and should have been enforced constitutional rights. That year, O'Hara succeeded in amending the appropriations bill for the District of Columbia (which was then administered by the US Congress), in order to require that male and female teachers doing the same work and having the same certificates be paid equivalent salaries. Teachers of both races were paid equally during that period. He also attempted to secure compensation for freedmen who lost savings in the failure of the Freedmen's Savings and Trust Company, but was unsuccessful.

Among the 139 Republicans in the House of Representatives at the time, O'Hara was to only one to vote against the Edmunds–Tucker Act of 1887.

Because of Republican infighting in O'Hara's district, the vote in 1886 was split between another candidate and O'Hara. The Democrat Furnifold M. Simmons was elected by a plurality to the Fiftieth Congress. After his defeat in 1886, O'Hara ran for Congress unsuccessfully in 1888. He then resumed the practice of law in New Bern with his son Raphael.

In 1900 the Democrat-dominated state legislature passed a constitutional suffrage amendment that effectively disfranchised blacks through making voter registration more difficult. This status lasted for most blacks in the state until passage in the mid-1960s of civil rights legislation.

== Personal life ==
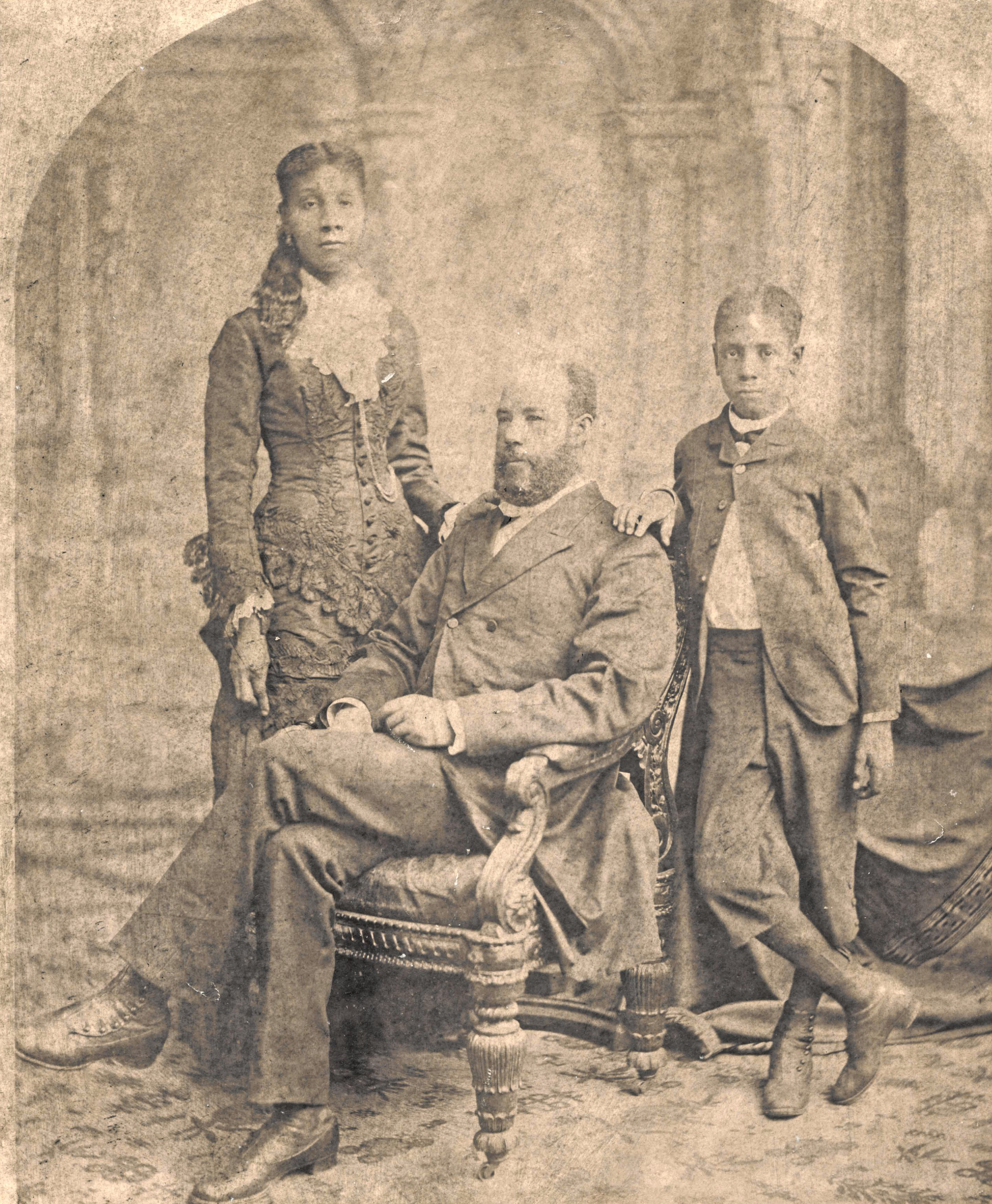
O'Hara family portrait (Elizabeth Eleanor, James E., and Raphael) c. 1883

O'Hara married 22-year-old Ann Maria Harris, in New Bern, on March 16, 1864. Two years later, he moved to Goldsboro, accepting a teaching position. However, Ann refused to move there with him, even after becoming pregnant. Their relationship deteriorated, and O'Hara stopped seeing Ann, who moved to Boston and changed her surname to "Cowan." It is unclear if he ever saw their child.

After Ann left him, O'Hara met and married Elizabeth Eleanor Harris, who went by "Libby”, on July 14, 1869. Elizabeth was from a prominent family in Oberlin, Ohio. She had relocated to the South, after the War to teach freedmen.

In 1878, when he ran for Congress, O'Hara was accused of bigamy because of his two marriages. Asserting that he had obtained a legal divorce from Ann without her knowledge, O'Hara denied the accusation.

He and Elizabeth had a son, Raphael. Raphael earned a law degree in 1895 at Shaw University and joined his father in his law practice, by then in New Bern, North Carolina. Raphael was the "first second-generation black lawyer in the state" and practiced for nearly 50 years.

O'Hara was a Roman Catholic. He died in New Bern on September 15, 1905, at the age of 61. Elizabeth O'Hara died on January 30, 1930, at the age of 80. Raphael O'Hara died on October 30, 1952, also at the age of 80.

== See also ==
- Civil rights movement (1865–1896)
- List of African-American United States representatives

== Bibliography ==
- Anderson, Eric (1982). "James O'Hara of North Carolina: Black Leadership and Local Government". In Rabinowitz, Howard N. (ed.). Southern Black Leaders of the Reconstruction Era. University of Illinois Press. pp. 101–125. ISBN 9780252009723.
- Justesen, Benjamin R. (2012). George Henry White: An Even Chance in the Race of Life. LSU Press. ISBN 9780807144770.
- Middleton, Stephen (2002). Black Congressmen During Reconstruction: A Documentary Sourcebook. Greenwood Publishing Group. ISBN 9780313322815.
- Smith, J. Clay Jr. (1999). Emancipation: The Making of the Black Lawyer, 1844-1944. University of Pennsylvania Press. ISBN 9780812216851.

U.S. House of Representatives
Preceded by Orlando Hubbs	Member of the U.S. House of Representatives from North Carolina's 2nd congressional district 1883–1887	Succeeded by Furnifold M. Simmons
