= A. Paul Kitchin Sr. =

American politician (1873–1923)

A. Paul Kitchin

Member of the North Carolina Senate from the 4th district
- In office November 8, 1910 – November 5, 1912
- Preceded by: E. L. Travis
- Succeeded by: Walter E. Daniel
- Constituency: Halifax County

Member of the North Carolina House of Representatives from Halifax County
- In office November 6, 1906 – November 8, 1910
- Preceded by: Sands Gayle

Personal details
- Born: Alvin Paul Kitchin; April 24, 1873 Scotland Neck, North Carolina, United States
- Died: June 28, 1923 (aged 50) Seven Springs, North Carolina, United States
- Party: Democratic
- Spouse: Carrie Lawrence (m. 1907)
- Children: 4, including A. Paul
- Parent: William H. Kitchin (father)
- Relatives: W. W. Kitchin (brother); Claude Kitchin (brother); Thurman D. Kitchin (brother)
- Education: Wake Forest College (LLB)
- Occupation: Lawyer; politician

Alvin Paul Kitchin (April 24, 1873 – June 28, 1923) was an American lawyer and politician who served in both houses of the North Carolina General Assembly. His father, William H. Kitchin, and two of his elder brothers, W. W. and Claude, were prominent North Carolina politicians, while his younger brother, Thurman D. Kitchin, was a longtime president of Wake Forest College. William, W. W., and Claude all served in the United States House of Representatives, as did Kitchin's son and namesake, A. Paul Kitchin. W. W. also served a term as governor of the state, during Kitchin's time in the state legislature.
