= Harold W. Tribble =

American theologian (1899–1986)

10th President of Wake Forest University
- In office 1950–1967
- Preceded by: Thurman D. Kitchin
- Succeeded by: James R. Scales

Personal details
- Born: Harold Wayland Tribble; November 18, 1899
- Died: June 17, 1986 (aged 86)
- Occupation: Theologian, educator, author

Harold Wayland Tribble (November 18, 1899 – June 17, 1986) was an American theologian, educator, and author who served as Wake Forest University's president from 1950 to 1967. A prominent Baptist minister, Tribble's tenure saw the institution's significant growth, relocation, and eventual transition from a college to a university.
