= Orlando Hubbs =

American politician

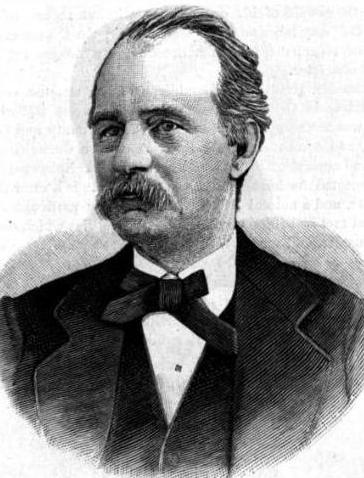

Member of the New York State Senate
- In office 1910–1911

Member of the New York State Assembly
- In office 1902–1908

Member of the U.S. House of Representatives from North Carolina's 2nd district
- In office March 4, 1881 – March 3, 1883
- Preceded by: William H. Kitchin
- Succeeded by: James E. O'Hara

Personal details
- Born: Orlando Hubbs; February 18, 1840 Commack, New York, U.S.
- Died: December 5, 1930 (aged 90) Smithtown, New York, U.S.
- Party: Republican

Orlando Hubbs (February 18, 1840 – December 5, 1930) was an American carriage builder, ship's joiner and politician. He moved from New York to North Carolina in 1865, where he helped organize the Republican Party in the state. He served as a U.S. Congressman from North Carolina between 1881 and 1883.

== Early life and education ==
Born in Commack, New York on Long Island, Hubbs attended local schools. He moved to Northport, New York in 1856 and learned the trade of a carriage and wagon builder. He subsequently became employed as a ship’s joiner at Hunters Point, New York during the American Civil War.

== Political career ==
In 1865, Hubbs moved to New Bern, North Carolina and became engaged in mercantile pursuits. He took an active part in organizing the Republican Party in North Carolina.

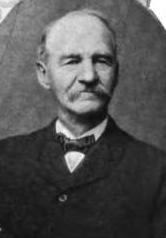
Orlando Hubbs (1903)

From 1871 to 1881 Hubbs was elected as sheriff of Craven County. He ran for United States House of Representatives in 1880, an election cycle in which the GOP convention was divided over his party nomination. Curtis H. Brogden, a former congressman, emerged in the campaign as an outspoken opponent of Hubbs. However, the publicity of the factionalism dissolved during the general election campaign, where Hubbs defeated Democratic white supremacist William H. Kitchin by fifteen percentage points.

During the 47th congressional session (1881–83), Hubbs was dubbed as being one of four "carpetbaggers," and worked quietly on patronage for political supporters, in addition to pursuing matters important to his district. In early January 1883, Hubbs was one of only seven House Republicans to vote against the Pendleton Civil Service Reform Act, legislation sponsored by Ohio Jim Crow Democrat George H. Pendleton to replace the spoils system (which Radical Republicans effectively used in the post-Civil War years to ensure civil rights for blacks) with a bloated bureaucracy controlled by Democrats to discriminate against blacks. Under immense political pressure following the assassination of President James A. Garfield, the vast majority of Stalwarts which had opposed civil service reform ultimately voted for the Pendleton Act.

In the 1882 United States House of Representatives elections, Hubbs ran for re-election, though once again faced GOP factionalism. The party's district convention resulted in disorder and confusion, as both he and attorney James E. O'Hara claimed to be the actual party nominee for the general election. Hubbs subsequently dropped out of the race in mid-October that year, noting the disastrous consequences of the intraparty schism. O'Hara then won the general election that year to succeed Hubbs.

During the 1884 United States presidential election, Hubbs served as a presidential elector for the Republican nominee James G. Blaine, who lost the general election to Bourbon Democrat Grover Cleveland.

In 1890, he returned to New York state and Long Island, settling in Central Islip on the South Shore. He was a member of the New York State Assembly (Suffolk Co., 2nd D.) in 1903, 1904, 1905, 1906, 1907 and 1908. He served in the New York Senate in 1909 and 1910.

He then lived in Smithtown until his death in 1930. His body was interred in Commack Cemetery, in his hometown of Commack.

U.S. House of Representatives
| Preceded by William H. Kitchin | Member of the U.S. House of Representatives from North Carolina's 2nd congressional district 1881–1883 | Succeeded by James E. O'Hara |
New York State Assembly
| Preceded by George A. Robinson | New York State Assembly; Suffolk County, 1st District; 1903–1908 | Succeeded by George L. Thompson |
New York State Senate
| Preceded by Carll S. Burr Jr. | New York State Senate; 1st District; 1909–1910 | Succeeded by James L. Long |
