= Lycurgus R. Varser =

American judge (1878–1959)

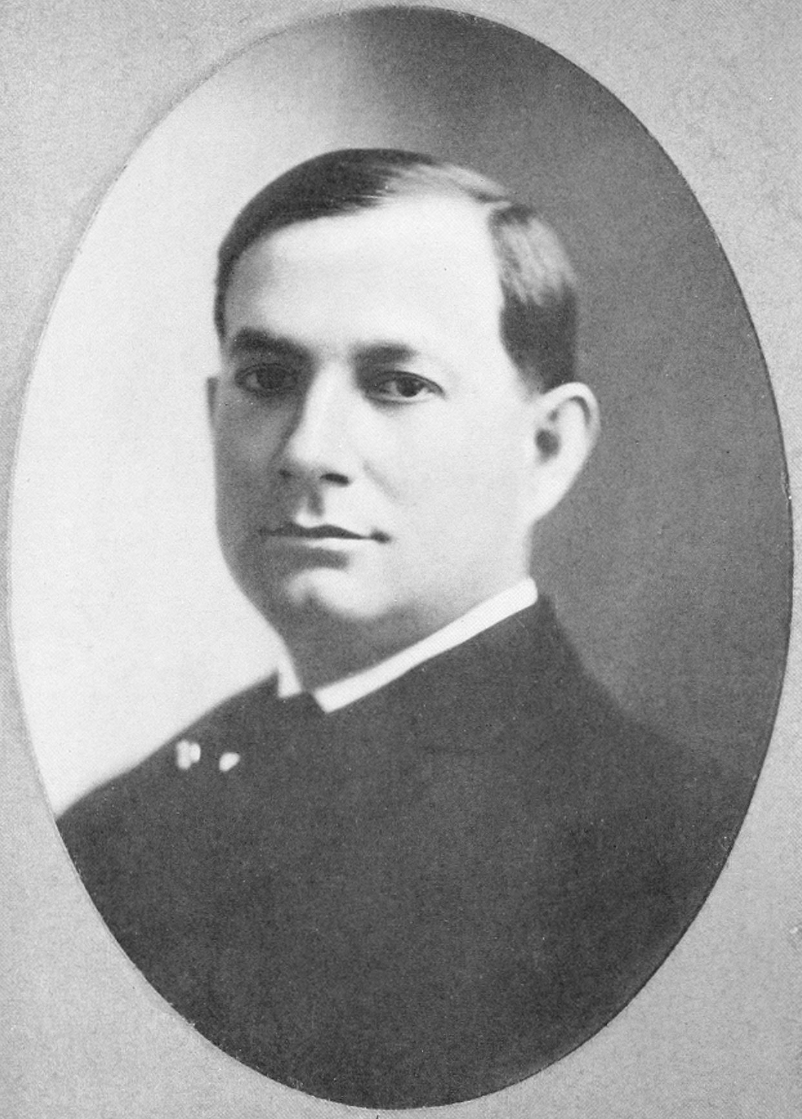

Associate Justice of the North Carolina Supreme Court
- In office March 16, 1925 – December 31, 1925
- Appointed by: Angus Wilton McLean
- Preceded by: Walter P. Stacy
- Succeeded by: Willis J. Brogden

Personal details
- Born: August 13, 1878; Gates County, North Carolina
- Died: October 19, 1959 (aged 81); Charlotte, North Carolina
- Education: Wake Forest University (BA, LLB)
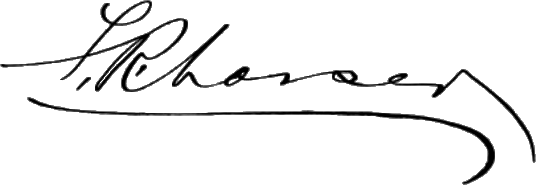
- Signature

Lycurgus Rayner Varser (August 13, 1878 – October 19, 1959) was an associate justice of the North Carolina Supreme Court, serving for nine months in 1925.

== Biography ==
Varser was born in Gates County, North Carolina, and attended Reynoldson Academy. He began attending Wake Forest University in 1895, earning his Bachelor of Arts degree in 1899 and his law degree in 1901. He was admitted to the bar in 1901. He took up the practice of law in Kinston, North Carolina. On June 29, 1904 he married Lily Ford Snead of Virginia. He remained in Kinston until 1911 when he moved to Lumberton, North Carolina. There, he joined the law firm of Angus Wilton McLean and Dickson McLean. By 1919, he was a director of the National Bank of Lumberton. He was elected to the North Carolina Senate in 1920, and reelected in 1922, serving on various committees including the agriculture and appropriations committees. He became president of the North Carolina Bar Association in 1922, serving in that capacity until 1923.

In 1925, Walter P. Stacy was appointed to be the chief justice of the North Carolina Supreme Court, creating a vacancy at associate justice. Governor Angus McLean appointed Vargas, his former partner, on March 16, 1925 to fill the vacancy. During his tenure, Vargas authored 65 opinions. He served as an associate justice for nine months, resigning the post on December 31, 1925.

Following retirement from the court, he returned to Lumberton where he formed the law firm of Varser, Lawrence, Proctor and McIntyre, practicing law with that firm until this death. He was appointed to The North Carolina State Board of Public Welfare in 1931, but resigned from that position before the term expiration when he became a state bar examiner. He was the chairman of the State Board of Law Examiners from 1933 until his death.

Varser died in his sleep at his home in Charlotte, North Carolina, with no preceding illness.

Political offices
Preceded by Walter P. Stacy	Justice of the North Carolina Supreme Court; 1925–1925	Succeeded by Willis J. Brogden
