= William Walton Kitchin =

52nd Governor of North Carolina

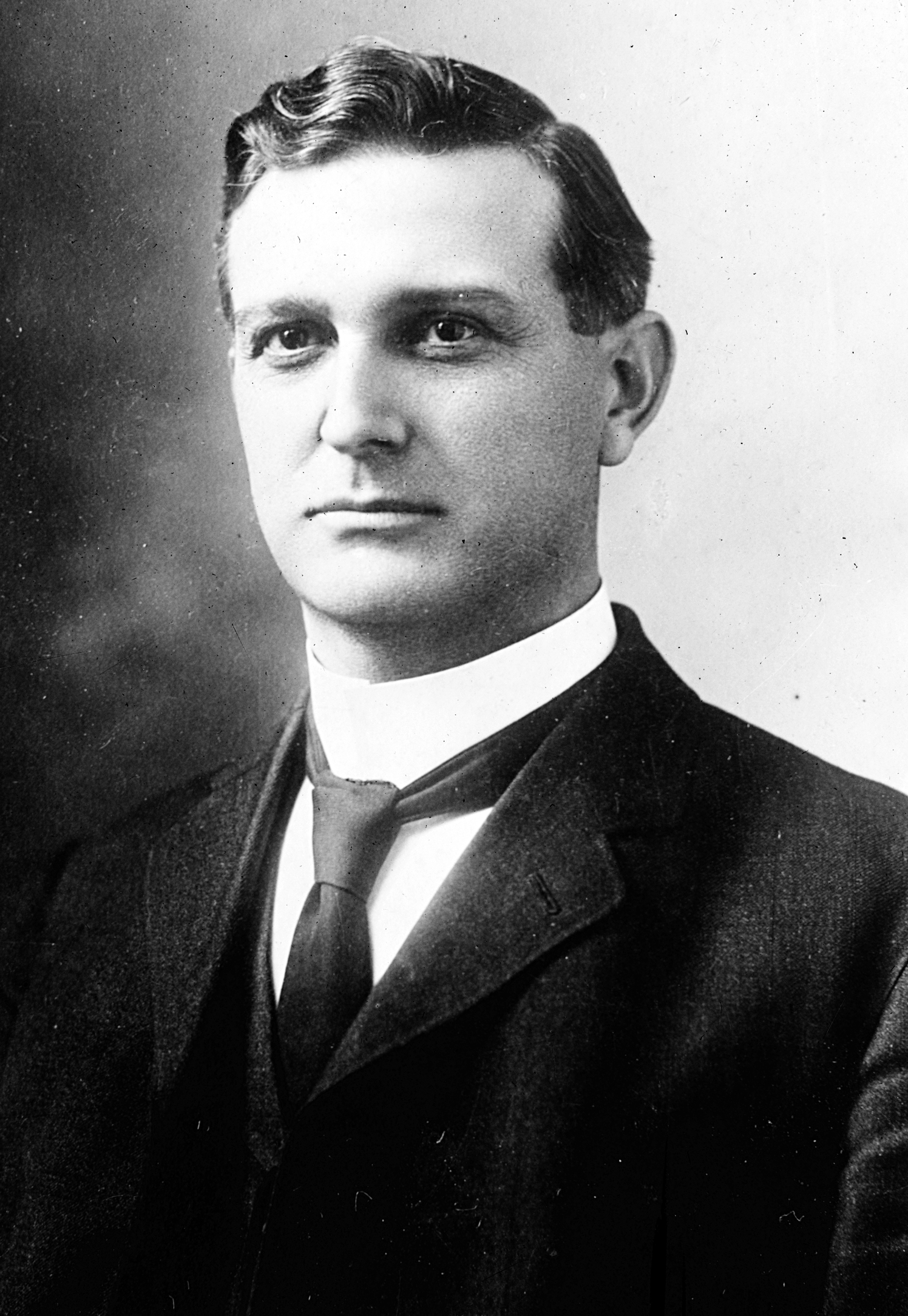

52nd Governor of North Carolina
- In office January 12, 1909 – January 15, 1913
- Lieutenant: William C. Newland
- Preceded by: Robert Broadnax Glenn
- Succeeded by: Locke Craig

Member of the U.S. House of Representatives from North Carolina's 5th district
- In office March 4, 1897 – January 11, 1909
- Preceded by: Thomas Settle III
- Succeeded by: John M. Morehead

Personal details
- Born: William Walton Kitchin; October 9, 1866 Scotland Neck, North Carolina, U.S.
- Died: November 9, 1924 (aged 58) Scotland Neck, North Carolina, U.S.
- Party: Democratic
- Spouse: Sue Musette Satterfield
- Children: 6
- Parent: William H. Kitchin (father)
- Relatives: Claude Kitchin (brother); A. Paul Kitchin Sr. (brother); Thurman D. Kitchin (brother)
- Education: Wake Forest University; University of North Carolina School of Law
- Profession: Lawyer; politician

William Walton Kitchin (October 9, 1866 – November 9, 1924) was an American attorney who served as the 52nd governor of the U.S. state of North Carolina from 1909 to 1913.

== Early life and family ==
W.W. Kitchin was the son of William H. Kitchin and Maria Figures Arrington. He was born in Scotland Neck, North Carolina. He was the brother of Claude Kitchin and the uncle of Alvin Paul Kitchin, each of whom served in the United States Congress.

Kitchn attended Vine Hill Academy in Scotland Neck. He graduated from Wake Forest College in 1884, studied law at the University of North Carolina at Chapel Hill, and passed the North Carolina Bar examination in 1887. He practiced law in Roxboro, North Carolina, where he built the Governor William W. and Musette Satterfield Kitchin House.

On 22 December 1892, Kitchin married Sue Musette Satterfield of Roxboro. They had six children: Sue Arrington (22 October 1893 – 5 August 1954), William Walton (16 August 1895 – 30 September 1905), Anne Maria (23 October 1897 – 16 January 1995), Elizabeth Gertrude (19 December 1899 – 9 September 1979), Clement Satterfield (19 June 1902 – 21 December 1930), and Musette Satterfield (10 August 1906 – 17 October 1996).

== Political career ==
In 1892, he ran unsuccessfully for the North Carolina Senate but was later elected for six terms in the United States House of Representatives, from 1897 to 1909. In 1898, he helped lead the Wilmington massacre, a violent coup d'état by a group of white supremacists. They expelled opposition black and white political leaders from the city, destroyed the property and businesses of black citizens built up since the Civil War, including the only black newspaper in the city, and killed an estimated 60 to more than 300 people. With other members of his family, he was an active participant in leading to the approval of a state constitutional amendment in 1900 placing numerous limitations on the right of black Tar Heels to vote. In January, 1901, George Henry White, an African-American, included Kitchin in his Congressional farewell address. He said that no politician had done more to bring the African-American into disrepute. White also said that Kitchin attempted to disprove African-Americans were worthy of the Fourteenth Amendment.

In 1906 Kitchin proposed an amendment to the Post Office Department's appropriations bill to end the $167,000 subsidy paid to Southern Railway funding the Fast Mail service, which served his constituency directly and was the last fast mail train in the United States that received such a subsidy. The train was discontinued on January 1, 1907, as a result, and Kitchin's amendment was later used as a campaign issue against him.

Limited to one term as governor by the state constitution of the time, Kitchin ran unsuccessfully for the United States Senate in 1912. His tenure as governor was highly productive: he increased expenditures for public education and public health services, oversaw expansion of railroads and increased stability of the state's banks, and presided over other reforms. After completing his term, Governor Kitchin practiced law in Raleigh, NC until 1919, when his declining health led him to retire to his home in Scotland Neck, NC. He died in 1924 and is buried in the Scotland Neck Baptist Cemetery.

Party political offices
Preceded by Robert Broadnax Glenn	Democratic nominee for Governor of North Carolina; 1908	Succeeded by Locke Craig
U.S. House of Representatives
Preceded by Thomas Settle III	United States Representative from North Carolina's 5th congressional district 1897-1909	Succeeded by John M. Morehead
Political offices
Preceded by Robert Broadnax Glenn	Governor of North Carolina; 1909-1913	Succeeded by Locke Craig
