= John Adams Hyman =

American politician (1840–1891)

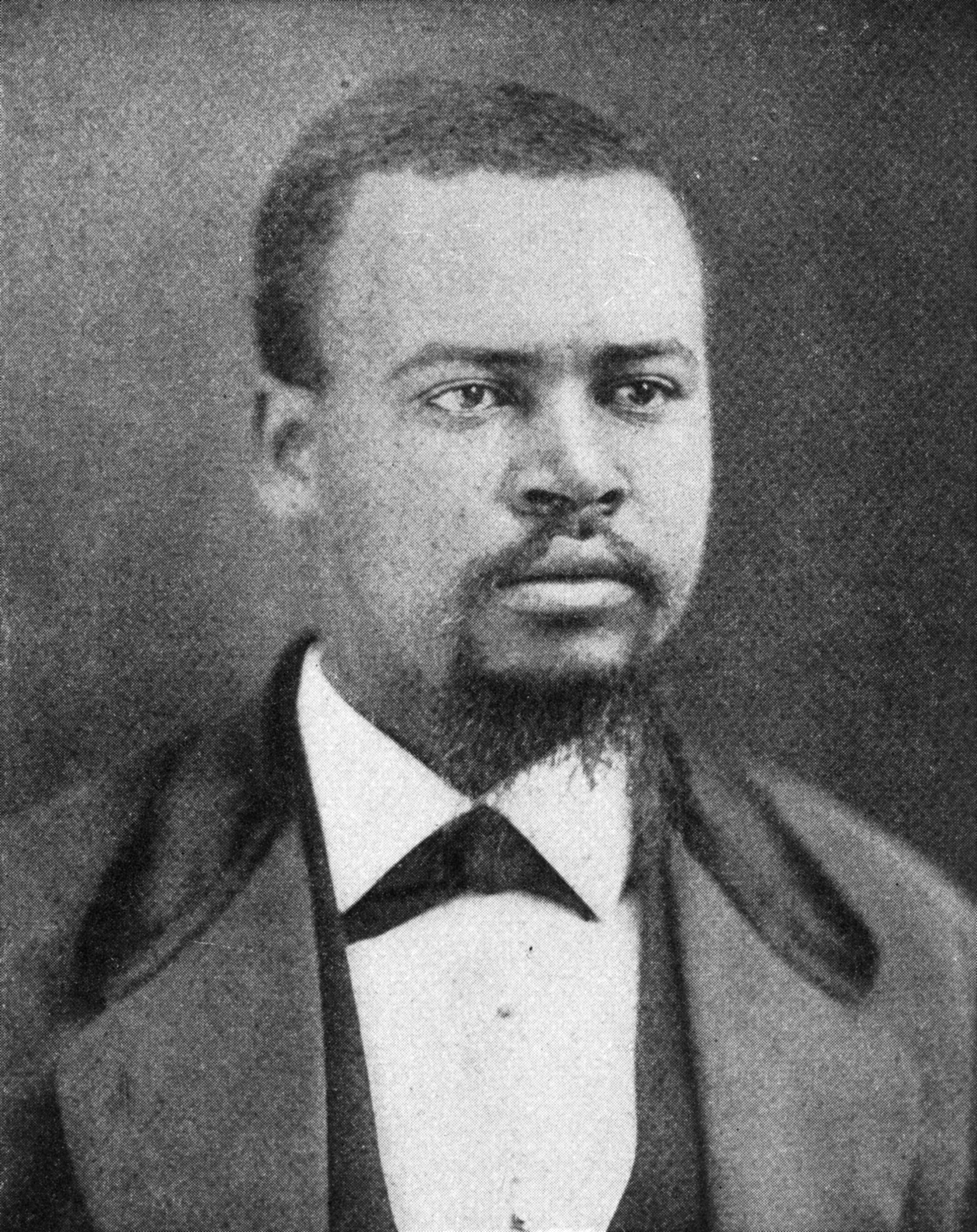

Member of the U.S. House of Representatives from North Carolina's 2nd district
- In office March 4, 1875 – March 3, 1877
- Preceded by: Charles R. Thomas
- Succeeded by: Curtis Hooks Brogden

Member of the North Carolina Senate
- In office 1868–1874

Personal details
- Born: July 23, 1840 near Warrenton, North Carolina, U.S.
- Died: September 14, 1891 (aged 51) Washington, D.C., U.S.
- Party: Republican

John Adams Hyman (July 23, 1840 – September 14, 1891) was a U.S. Congressman from North Carolina from 1875 to 1877. A Republican, he was the first African American to represent the state in the House of Representatives. He was elected from North Carolina's 2nd congressional district, including counties in the northeast around New Bern. Earlier he served in the North Carolina Senate.

== Early life ==
Born into slavery on July 23, 1840, near Warrenton, North Carolina, Hyman was later enslaved in Alabama. Hyman did not receive any formal education as a child. By 1861, he had returned to North Carolina and was working as a janitor for a jeweler named King in Warrenton. King was from Pennsylvania and taught Hyman to read and write; when this was discovered by whites in town, they forced King and his wife to leave the community. When Hyman persisted in trying to gain an education, at the age of 21 he was sold to a new master in Alabama. In twenty-five years as a slave, Hyman was sold at least eight times.

== Post-Civil War and political career ==
After the Civil War and the emancipation of enslaved people, Hyman returned to North Carolina in 1865. He worked as a farmer and pursued elementary studies. He also established a grocery store in Warrenton.

Recognized for his leadership, Hyman was chosen as a delegate to the state equal rights convention in 1865 and to the state Constitutional Convention in 1868. Hyman was elected to the North Carolina Senate, where he served from 1868 to 1874 during the Reconstruction era.

In 1874, Hyman was elected as a Republican to the 44th United States Congress from North Carolina's 2nd congressional district, running against Democrat Garland H. White. He "had swept Craven and seven other counties in the newly created district that became known as the 'Black Second.'" Democrats in the legislature had established the district to try to reduce black influence in politics in other parts of the state, as this was a black-majority area. The freedmen and previously free blacks elected all but two Republican representatives for the next quarter century. Hyman served for one term (March 4, 1875 – March 3, 1877). After unsuccessfully running for the Republican renomination to Congress in 1876 and losing to Curtis Brogden, the immediate past governor, Hyman returned to agricultural pursuits.

Hyman was appointed as special deputy collector of internal revenue for the fourth district of North Carolina from July 1, 1877 to June 30, 1878.

He moved to Washington, D.C., after being accused of misappropriating church funds. He worked for the United States Post Office Department and for the United States Department of Agriculture in Washington, D.C.

== Legacy and honors ==
- A North Carolina historical marker has been installed in Warrenton, about a block from Hyman's former homesite.

== Personal life ==
Hyman died in Washington, D.C. on September 14, 1891. He was survived by his wife and four children. He was buried in Columbian Harmony Cemetery in Washington, D.C.

== See also ==
- List of African-American United States representatives
- African American officeholders from the end of the Civil War until before 1900

== Works cited ==
- Balanoff, Elizabeth (January 1972). "Negro Legislators in the North Carolina General Assembly, July, 1868-February, 1872". The North Carolina Historical Review. 49 (1): 22–55. JSTOR 23529002.

U.S. House of Representatives
Preceded by Charles Thomas	Member of the U.S. House of Representatives from North Carolina's 2nd congressional district 1875–1877	Succeeded by Curtis H. Brogden
