= Claude Kitchin =

American politician (1869–1923)

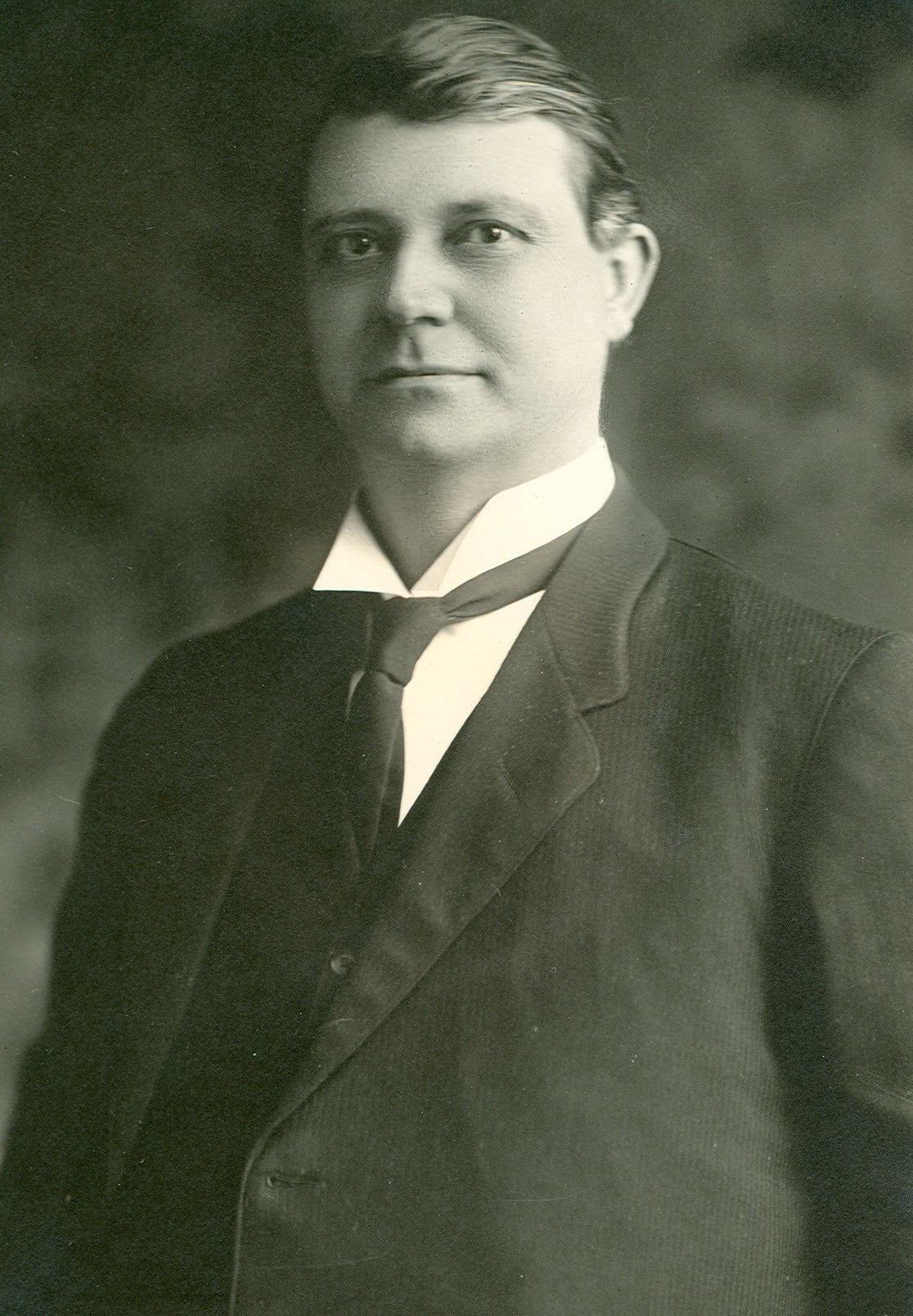

House Minority Leader
- In office 1921–1923
- Preceded by: Champ Clark
- Succeeded by: Finis Garrett

Leader of the House Democratic Caucus
- In office March 4, 1921 – March 4, 1923
- Preceded by: Champ Clark
- Succeeded by: Finis J. Garrett

House Majority Leader
- In office 1915–1919
- Preceded by: Oscar W. Underwood
- Succeeded by: Frank W. Mondell

Member of the U.S. House of Representatives from North Carolina's 2nd district
- In office March 4, 1901 – May 31, 1923
- Preceded by: George H. White
- Succeeded by: John H. Kerr

Personal details
- Born: March 24, 1869 Scotland Neck, North Carolina, US
- Died: May 31, 1923 (aged 54) Wilson, North Carolina, US
- Party: Democratic
- Parent: William H. Kitchin (father)
- Relatives: W. W. Kitchin (brother); A. Paul Kitchin Sr. (brother); Thurman D. Kitchin (brother)
- Education: Wake Forest College

Claude Kitchin (March 24, 1869 – May 31, 1923) was an American politician who served as a member of the United States House of Representatives from the state of North Carolina from 1901 until his death in 1923. A lifelong member of the Democratic Party, he was elected House majority leader for the 64th and 65th congresses (1915–1919), and minority leader during the 67th Congress (1921–1923).

As World War I shifted the federal government's focus to foreign policy, Kitchin became increasingly alarmed by the prospect of U.S. becoming a combatant. He opposed the President Wilson's preparedness movement and in April 1917 spoke strongly against a declaration of war against Germany.

== Early life ==
He was born in 1869, near Scotland Neck, in Halifax County, North Carolina in 1869, the third of 11 children born to William H. and Maria Arrington Kitchin. He attended Vine Hill Academy in Scotland Neck, North Carolina.

Kitchen attended Wake Forest College, graduating in 1888. Afterward, he read law and served as assistant registrar of deeds in the county. He was admitted to the bar in September 1890.

During the 1890s, Kitchin helped mobilize the Red Shirts, armed groups of militant white supremacists who rode through rural communities dissuading blacks from voting. These groups functioned as an arm of state's Democratic Party, and it was his effectiveness during the run-up to the 1896 and 1898 elections that gave rise to his congressional career.

In 1898, Kitchin helped lead the Wilmington massacre, a violent coup d'état by a group of white supremacists. At a November 1 rally in Laurinburg, Kitchin was cheered by a crowd of several thousand whites when he proclaimed, "We cannot outnumber the negroes...And so we must either outcheat, outcount or outshoot them." He announced that any black constable attempting to arrest a white man would be lynched. On the day after the election, white citizens of Wilmington expelled opposition black and white political leaders from the city, destroyed the property and businesses of black citizens built up since the Civil War, including the only black newspaper in the city, and killed an estimated 60 to more than 300 people.

== Congressional career ==
Kitchin was first elected to Congress from North Carolina's 2nd district in 1900. He was re-elected 11 times, serving until his death.

In Congress, he served on the House Ways and Means Committee, chairing the Committee from 1915 to 1919. From 1915 to 1919 he was House majority leader; from this position he opposed the Wilson administration's "Preparedness" crusade, seeking unsuccessfully to hold down the growth in size of the army and navy.

He was among the few members of Congress who voted against the U.S. declaration of war on Germany in April 1917 (approved 373–50 by the House and 82–6 by the Senate). Afterward, he fully supported the war effort, though he remained a critic of some of the administration's war policies, especially regarding taxation policies. He championed an "excess profits" tax that was steeply progressive over a policy of selling Liberty Bonds that shifted the financial burden of the war onto future generations.

== Family and death ==
He married Kate Mills in 1890; they had ten children. His brother William Walton Kitchin was governor of North Carolina from 1909 to 1913.

After giving an impassioned speech in March 1920 he suffered a severe stroke, from which he never fully recovered. During the winter of 1922–23 he contracted influenza and pneumonia, and, died from complications on May 31, 1923. He is buried in Scotland Neck, North Carolina at the Trinity Episcopal Cemetery.

== See also ==
- List of members of the United States Congress who died in office (1900–1949)

== Sources ==
- Arnett, Alex Mathews. "Claude Kitchin Versus the Patrioteers" North Carolina Historical Review 14.1 (1937): 20–30. online
- Arnett. Alex M. Claude Kitchin and the Wilson War Policies (1937). xii + 341 pp.
- Herring, George C. James Hay and the Preparedness Controversy, 1915-1916. Journal of Southern History 30.4 (1964): 383–404.
- Ingle, Homer Larry. " Pilgrimage to reform: A life of Claude Kitchin" (PhD dissertation, U of Wisconsin - Madison; ProQuest Dissertations & Theses, 1967. 6706801) Online at academic libraries.
- Watson, Richard L. Jr. (1988). Kitchin, Claude 24 Mar. 1869–31 May 1923. Dictionary of North Carolina Biography. .
- Zucchino, David (2020). Wilmington's Lie: The Murderous Coup of 1898 and the Rise of White Supremacy. Atlantic Monthly Press. ISBN 9780802128386.

U.S. House of Representatives
Preceded by George H. White	Member of the U.S. House of Representatives from North Carolina's 2nd congressional district 1901–1923	Succeeded by John H. Kerr
Preceded by Oscar W. Underwood; Alabama	House Majority Leader; 1915–1919	Succeeded by Frank W. Mondell; Connecticut
