= North Carolina's congressional delegations =

These are tables of congressional delegations from North Carolina to the United States House of Representatives and the United States Senate.

The current dean of the North Carolina delegation is Representative Virginia Foxx (NC-5).

== U.S. House of Representatives ==
=== Current members ===
The delegation has 14 members, 10 Republicans and 4 Democrats. In 2022, per the 2020 United States census, North Carolina gained one new congressional seat.

Current U.S. representatives from North Carolina
District	Member (Residence)	Party	Incumbent since	CPVI (2026)	District map
1st	Don Davis (Snow Hill)	Democratic	January 3, 2023	R+5	
2nd	Deborah Ross (Raleigh)	Democratic	January 3, 2021	D+17	
3rd	Greg Murphy (Greenville)	Republican	September 17, 2019	R+6	
4th	Valerie Foushee (Hillsborough)	Democratic	January 3, 2023	D+23	
5th	Virginia Foxx (Banner Elk)	Republican	January 3, 2005	R+9	
6th	Addison McDowell (Bermuda Run)	Republican	January 3, 2025	R+9	
7th	David Rouzer (Wilmington)	Republican	January 3, 2015	R+7	
8th	Mark Harris (Indian Trail)	Republican	January 3, 2025	R+10	
9th	Richard Hudson (Southern Pines)	Republican	January 3, 2013	R+8	
10th	Pat Harrigan (Hickory)	Republican	January 3, 2025	R+9	
11th	Chuck Edwards (Flat Rock)	Republican	January 3, 2023	R+5	
12th	Alma Adams (Charlotte)	Democratic	November 4, 2014	D+24	
13th	Brad Knott (Raleigh)	Republican	January 3, 2025	R+9	
14th	Tim Moore (Kings Mountain)	Republican	January 3, 2025	R+8	

=== 1789–1793: 5 seats ===
After North Carolina ratified the United States Constitution, on November 21, 1789, it was apportioned five seats.

Congress	1st district	2nd district	3rd district	4th district	5th district
1st (1789–1791)	John Baptista Ashe (AA)	John Steele (PA)	Hugh Williamson (PA)	Timothy Bloodworth (AA)	John Sevier (PA) (Note: The district was ceded to the federal government to become Tennessee before Sevier could take his seat, but was seated anyway.)
2nd (1791–1793)	John Baptista Ashe (AA)	John Steele (PA)	Hugh Williamson (PA)	William Barry Grove (PA)	Nathaniel Macon (AA)

=== 1793–1803: 10 seats ===
Following the 1790 census, North Carolina was apportioned 10 seats.

Congress	District									
Congress	1st	2nd	3rd	4th	5th	6th	7th	8th	9th	10th
3rd (1793–1795)	William Johnston; Dawson (AA)	Matthew; Locke (AA)	"Pleasant Gardens; Joe" McDowell (AA)	Alexander; Mebane (AA)	Nathaniel; Macon (AA)	James; Gillespie (AA)	William Barry; Grove (PA)	Benjamin; Williams (AA)	Thomas; Blount (AA)	Joseph; Winston (AA)
4th (1795–1797)	Jesse Franklin (DR)	Matthew; Locke (DR)	James Holland (DR)	Absalom Tatom (DR)	Nathaniel; Macon (DR)	James; Gillespie (DR)	William Barry; Grove (F)	Dempsey; Burgess (DR)	Thomas; Blount (DR)	Nathan Bryan (DR)
4th (1795–1797)	Jesse Franklin (DR)	Matthew; Locke (DR)	James Holland (DR)	William F. Strudwick (F)	Nathaniel; Macon (DR)	James; Gillespie (DR)	William Barry; Grove (F)	Dempsey; Burgess (DR)	Thomas; Blount (DR)	Nathan Bryan (DR)
5th (1797–1799)	"Quaker Meadows; Joe" McDowell (DR)	Matthew; Locke (DR)	Robert Williams (DR)	Richard; Stanford (DR)	Nathaniel; Macon (DR)	James; Gillespie (DR)	William Barry; Grove (F)	Dempsey; Burgess (DR)	Thomas; Blount (DR)	Nathan Bryan (DR)
5th (1797–1799)	"Quaker Meadows; Joe" McDowell (DR)	Matthew; Locke (DR)	Robert Williams (DR)	Richard; Stanford (DR)	Nathaniel; Macon (DR)	James; Gillespie (DR)	William Barry; Grove (F)	Dempsey; Burgess (DR)	Thomas; Blount (DR)	Richard Dobbs; Spaight (DR)
6th (1799–1801)	Joseph Dickson (F)	Willis; Alston (DR)	Robert Williams (DR)	Richard; Stanford (DR)	Nathaniel; Macon (DR)	William Henry; Hill (F)	William Barry; Grove (F)	Archibald; Henderson (F)	David Stone (DR)	Richard Dobbs; Spaight (DR)
7th (1801–1803)	Charles Johnson (DR)	Willis; Alston (DR)	Robert Williams (DR)	Richard; Stanford (DR)	Nathaniel; Macon (DR)	William Henry; Hill (F)	William Barry; Grove (F)	Archibald; Henderson (F)	John Stanly (F)	James Holland (DR)
7th (1801–1803)	Thomas Wynns (DR)	Willis; Alston (DR)	Robert Williams (DR)	Richard; Stanford (DR)	Nathaniel; Macon (DR)	William Henry; Hill (F)	William Barry; Grove (F)	Archibald; Henderson (F)	John Stanly (F)	James Holland (DR)

=== 1803–1813: 12 seats ===
Following the 1800 census, North Carolina was apportioned 12 seats.

Congress	District										District	
Congress	1st	2nd	3rd	4th	5th	6th	7th	8th	9th	10th	11th	12th
8th (1803–1805)	Thomas; Wynns (DR)	Willis; Alston (DR)	William Kennedy (DR)	William; Blackledge (DR)	James; Gillespie (DR)	Nathaniel; Macon (DR)	Samuel D. Purviance (F)	Richard; Stanford (DR)	Marmaduke; Williams (DR)	Nathaniel; Alexander (DR)	James; Holland (DR)	Joseph; Winston (DR)
9th (1805–1807)	Thomas; Wynns (DR)	Willis; Alston (DR)	Thomas Blount (DR)	William; Blackledge (DR)	Thomas S. Kenan (DR)	Nathaniel; Macon (DR)	Duncan; McFarlan (DR)	Richard; Stanford (DR)	Marmaduke; Williams (DR)	Nathaniel; Alexander (DR)	James; Holland (DR)	Joseph; Winston (DR)
9th (1805–1807)	Thomas; Wynns (DR)	Willis; Alston (DR)	Thomas Blount (DR)	William; Blackledge (DR)	Thomas S. Kenan (DR)	Nathaniel; Macon (DR)	Duncan; McFarlan (DR)	Richard; Stanford (DR)	Marmaduke; Williams (DR)	Evan Shelby; Alexander (DR)	James; Holland (DR)	Joseph; Winston (DR)
10th (1807–1809)	Lemuel; Sawyer (DR)	Willis; Alston (DR)	Thomas Blount (DR)	William; Blackledge (DR)	Thomas S. Kenan (DR)	Nathaniel; Macon (DR)	John; Culpepper (F)	Richard; Stanford (DR)	Marmaduke; Williams (DR)	Evan Shelby; Alexander (DR)	James; Holland (DR)	Meshack; Franklin (DR)
11th (1809–1811)	Lemuel; Sawyer (DR)	Willis; Alston (DR)	William Kennedy (DR)	John Stanly (F)	Thomas S. Kenan (DR)	Nathaniel; Macon (DR)	Archibald; McBryde (F)	Richard; Stanford (DR)	James; Cochran (DR)	Joseph; Pearson (F)	James; Holland (DR)	Meshack; Franklin (DR)
12th (1811–1813)	Lemuel; Sawyer (DR)	Willis; Alston (DR)	Thomas Blount (DR)	William; Blackledge (DR)	William R. King (DR)	Nathaniel; Macon (DR)	Archibald; McBryde (F)	Richard; Stanford (DR)	James; Cochran (DR)	Joseph; Pearson (F)	Israel; Pickens (DR)	Meshack; Franklin (DR)
12th (1811–1813)	Lemuel; Sawyer (DR)	Willis; Alston (DR)	William Kennedy (DR)	William; Blackledge (DR)	William R. King (DR)	Nathaniel; Macon (DR)	Archibald; McBryde (F)	Richard; Stanford (DR)	James; Cochran (DR)	Joseph; Pearson (F)	Israel; Pickens (DR)	Meshack; Franklin (DR)

=== 1813–1843: 13 seats ===
Following the 1810 census, North Carolina was apportioned 13 seats.

Congress	District										District		
Congress	1st	2nd	3rd	4th	5th	6th	7th	8th	9th	10th	11th	12th	13th
13th (1813–1815)	William H. Murfree (DR)	Willis; Alston (DR)	William; Kennedy (DR)	William; Gaston (F)	William R. King (DR)	Nathaniel; Macon (DR)	John; Culpepper (F)	Richard; Stanford (DR)	Bartlett; Yancey (DR)	Joseph; Pearson (F)	Meshack; Franklin (DR)	Israel; Pickens (DR)	Peter; Forney (DR)
14th (1815–1817)	William H. Murfree (DR)	Joseph H. Bryan (DR)	James West; Clark (DR)	William; Gaston (F)	William R. King (DR)	Nathaniel; Macon (DR)	John; Culpepper (F)	Richard; Stanford (DR)	Bartlett; Yancey (DR)	William C. Love (DR)	Daniel M. Forney (DR)	Israel; Pickens (DR)	Lewis; Williams (DR) (Note: Supported the Crawford faction in the 1824 United States presidential election)
14th (1815–1817)	William H. Murfree (DR)	Joseph H. Bryan (DR)	James West; Clark (DR)	William; Gaston (F)	Charles Hooks (DR)	Weldon; Nathaniel; Edwards (DR)	John; Culpepper (F)	Samuel Dickens (DR)	Bartlett; Yancey (DR)	William C. Love (DR)	Daniel M. Forney (DR)	Israel; Pickens (DR)	Lewis; Williams (DR)
15th (1817–1819)	Lemuel; Sawyer (DR)	Joseph H. Bryan (DR)	Thomas H. Hall (DR)	Jesse; Slocumb (F)	James; Owen (DR)	Weldon; Nathaniel; Edwards (DR)	Alexander McMillan (F)	James; Strudwick; Smith (DR)	Thomas; Settle (DR)	George; Mumford (DR)	Daniel M. Forney (DR)	Felix; Walker (DR)	Lewis; Williams (DR)
15th (1817–1819)	Lemuel; Sawyer (DR)	Joseph H. Bryan (DR)	Thomas H. Hall (DR)	Jesse; Slocumb (F)	James; Owen (DR)	Weldon; Nathaniel; Edwards (DR)	James Stewart (F)	James; Strudwick; Smith (DR)	Thomas; Settle (DR)	George; Mumford (DR)	Daniel M. Forney (DR)	Felix; Walker (DR)	Lewis; Williams (DR)
16th (1819–1821)	Lemuel; Sawyer (DR)	Hutchins; Gordon; Burton (DR)	Thomas H. Hall (DR)	Jesse; Slocumb (F)	Charles; Hooks (DR)	Weldon; Nathaniel; Edwards (DR)	John; Culpepper (F)	James; Strudwick; Smith (DR)	Thomas; Settle (DR)	Charles; Fisher (DR)	William; Davidson (F)	Felix; Walker (DR)	Lewis; Williams (DR)
17th (1821–1823)	Lemuel; Sawyer (DR)	Hutchins; Gordon; Burton (DR)	Thomas H. Hall (DR)	William S. Blackledge (DR)	Charles; Hooks (DR)	Weldon; Nathaniel; Edwards (DR)	Archibald; McNeill (DR)	Josiah; Crudup (DR)	Romulus M. Saunders (DR)	John; Long (DR)	Henry; William; Connor (DR) (Note: Supported the Jackson faction in the 1824 United States presidential election)	Felix; Walker (DR)	Lewis; Williams (DR)
18th (1823–1825)	Alfred M. Gatlin (DR)	Hutchins; Gordon; Burton (DR)	Charles; Hooks (DR)	Richard D. Spaight Jr. (DR)	Thomas H. Hall (DR)	Weldon; Nathaniel; Edwards (DR)	John; Culpepper (F) (Note: Supported the Adams-Clay faction in the 1824 United States presidential election)	Willie P. Magnum (DR)	Romulus M. Saunders (DR)	John; Long (DR)	Henry; William; Connor (DR)	Robert B. Vance (DR)	Lewis; Williams (DR)
18th (1823–1825)	Alfred M. Gatlin (DR)	George Outlaw (DR)	Charles; Hooks (DR)	Richard D. Spaight Jr. (DR)	Thomas H. Hall (DR)	Weldon; Nathaniel; Edwards (DR)	John; Culpepper (F)	Willie P. Magnum (DR)	Romulus M. Saunders (DR)	John; Long (DR)	Henry; William; Connor (DR)	Robert B. Vance (DR)	Lewis; Williams (DR)
19th (1825–1827)	Lemuel; Sawyer (J)	Willis; Alston (J)	Richard; Hines (J)	John Heritage; Bryan (J)	Gabriel; Holmes (J)	Weldon N. Edwards (J)	Archibald; McNeill (J)	Willie P. Magnum (J)	Romulus M. Saunders (J)	John; Long (NR)	Henry; William; Connor (J)	Samuel; Price; Carson (J)	Lewis; Williams (NR)
19th (1825–1827)	Lemuel; Sawyer (J)	Willis; Alston (J)	Richard; Hines (J)	John Heritage; Bryan (J)	Gabriel; Holmes (J)	Weldon N. Edwards (J)	Archibald; McNeill (J)	Daniel; Laurens; Barringer (J)	Romulus M. Saunders (J)	John; Long (NR)	Henry; William; Connor (J)	Samuel; Price; Carson (J)	Lewis; Williams (NR)
20th (1827–1829)	Lemuel; Sawyer (J)	Willis; Alston (J)	Thomas H. Hall (J)	John Heritage; Bryan (NR)	Gabriel; Holmes (J)	Daniel; Turner (J)	John; Culpepper (NR)	Daniel; Laurens; Barringer (J)	Augustine H. Shepperd (NR)	John; Long (NR)	Henry; William; Connor (J)	Samuel; Price; Carson (J)	Lewis; Williams (NR)
21st (1829–1831)	William; Biddle; Shepard (NR)	Willis; Alston (J)	Thomas H. Hall (J)	Jesse; Speight (J)	Edward Bishop; Dudley (J)	Robert; Potter (J)	Edmund; Deberry (NR)	Daniel; Laurens; Barringer (J)	Augustine H. Shepperd (NR)	Abraham; Rencher (J)	Henry; William; Connor (J)	Samuel; Price; Carson (J)	Lewis; Williams (NR)
22nd (1831–1833)	William; Biddle; Shepard (NR)	John; Branch (J)	Thomas H. Hall (J)	Jesse; Speight (J)	James I. McKay (J)	Micajah T. Hawkins (J)	Lauchlin; Bethune (J)	Daniel; Laurens; Barringer (J)	Augustine H. Shepperd (NR)	Abraham; Rencher (J)	Henry; William; Connor (J)	Samuel; Price; Carson (J)	Lewis; Williams (NR)
23rd (1833–1835)	William; Biddle; Shepard (NR)	Jesse; Atherton; Bynum (J)	Thomas H. Hall (J)	Jesse; Speight (J)	James I. McKay (J)	Micajah T. Hawkins (J)	Edmund; Deberry (NR)	Daniel L. Barringer (NR)	Augustine H. Shepperd (NR)	Abraham; Rencher (NR)	Henry; William; Connor (J)	James; Graham (NR)	Lewis; Williams (NR)
24th (1835–1837)	William; Biddle; Shepard (NR)	Jesse; Atherton; Bynum (J)	Ebenezer; Pettigrew (NR)	Jesse; Speight (J)	James I. McKay (J)	Micajah T. Hawkins (J)	Edmund; Deberry (NR)	William; Montgomery (J)	Augustine H. Shepperd (NR)	Abraham; Rencher (NR)	Henry; William; Connor (J)	James; Graham (NR)	Lewis; Williams (NR)
25th (1837–1839)	Samuel T. Sawyer (W)	Jesse; Atherton; Bynum (D)	Edward; Stanly (W)	Charles B. Shepard (W)	James I. McKay (D)	Micajah T. Hawkins (D)	Edmund; Deberry (W)	William; Montgomery (D)	Augustine H. Shepperd (W)	Abraham; Rencher (W)	Henry; William; Connor (D)	James; Graham (W)	Lewis; Williams (W)
26th (1839–1841)	Kenneth; Rayner (W)	Jesse; Atherton; Bynum (D)	Edward; Stanly (W)	Charles B. Shepard (D)	James I. McKay (D)	Micajah T. Hawkins (D)	Edmund; Deberry (W)	William; Montgomery (D)	John; Hill (D)	Charles; Fisher (D)	Henry; William; Connor (D)	James; Graham (W)	Lewis; Williams (W)
27th (1841–1843)	Kenneth; Rayner (W)	John R. J. Daniel (D)	Edward; Stanly (W)	William H. Washington (W)	James I. McKay (D)	Archibald; Hunter; Arrington (D)	Edmund; Deberry (W)	Romulus M. Saunders (D)	Augustine H. Shepperd (W)	Abraham; Rencher (W)	Greene W. Caldwell (D)	James; Graham (W)	Lewis; Williams (W)
27th (1841–1843)	Kenneth; Rayner (W)	John R. J. Daniel (D)	Edward; Stanly (W)	William H. Washington (W)	James I. McKay (D)	Archibald; Hunter; Arrington (D)	Edmund; Deberry (W)	Romulus M. Saunders (D)	Augustine H. Shepperd (W)	Abraham; Rencher (W)	Greene W. Caldwell (D)	James; Graham (W)	Anderson; Mitchell (W)

=== 1843–1853: 9 seats ===
Following the 1840 census, North Carolina was apportioned nine seats.

Congress	District								
Congress	1st	2nd	3rd	4th	5th	6th	7th	8th	9th
28th (1843–1845)	Thomas L. Clingman (D)	Daniel Moreau; Barringer (W)	David Settle Reid (D)	Edmund Deberry (W)	Romulus M. Saunders (D)	James I. McKay (D)	John R. J. Daniel (D)	Archibald Hunter; Arrington (D)	Kenneth Rayner (W)
29th (1845–1847)	James Graham (W)	Daniel Moreau; Barringer (W)	David Settle Reid (D)	Alfred Dockery (W)	James C. Dobbin (D)	James I. McKay (D)	John R. J. Daniel (D)	Henry Selby Clark (D)	Asa Biggs (D)
30th (1847–1849)	Thomas L. Clingman (D)	Nathaniel Boyden (W)	Daniel Moreau; Barringer (W)	Augustine Henry; Shepperd (W)	Abraham Watkins; Venable (D)	John R. J. Daniel (D)	James I. McKay (D)	Richard Spaight; Donnell (W)	David Outlaw (W)
31st (1849–1851)	Thomas L. Clingman (D)	Joseph Person; Caldwell (W)	Edmund Deberry (W)	Augustine Henry; Shepperd (W)	Abraham Watkins; Venable (D)	John R. J. Daniel (D)	William S. Ashe (D)	Edward Stanly (W)	David Outlaw (W)
32nd (1851–1853)	Thomas L. Clingman (D)	Joseph Person; Caldwell (W)	Alfred Dockery (W)	James Turner; Morehead (W)	Abraham Watkins; Venable (D)	John R. J. Daniel (D)	William S. Ashe (D)	Edward Stanly (W)	David Outlaw (W)

=== 1853–1863: 8 seats ===
Following the 1850 census, North Carolina was apportioned eight seats.

Congress	District							
Congress	1st	2nd	3rd	4th	5th	6th	7th	8th
33rd (1853–1855)	Henry M. Shaw (D)	Thomas Hart; Ruffin (D)	William S. Ashe (D)	Sion H. Rogers (W)	John Kerr Jr. (W)	Richard C. Puryear (W)	F. Burton; Craige (D)	Thomas L. Clingman (D)
34th (1855–1857)	Robert Treat; Paine (KN)	Thomas Hart; Ruffin (D)	Warren; Winslow (D)	Lawrence; O'Bryan; Branch (D)	Edwin Godwin; Reade (KN)	Richard C. Puryear (KN)	F. Burton; Craige (D)	Thomas L. Clingman (D)
35th (1857–1859)	Henry M. Shaw (D)	Thomas Hart; Ruffin (D)	Warren; Winslow (D)	Lawrence; O'Bryan; Branch (D)	John Adams; Gilmer (KN)	Alfred Moore; Scales (D)	F. Burton; Craige (D)	Thomas L. Clingman (D)
35th (1857–1859)	Henry M. Shaw (D)	Thomas Hart; Ruffin (D)	Warren; Winslow (D)	Lawrence; O'Bryan; Branch (D)	John Adams; Gilmer (KN)	Alfred Moore; Scales (D)	F. Burton; Craige (D)	Zebulon; Vance (D)
36th (1859–1861)	William N. H. Smith (O)	Thomas Hart; Ruffin (D)	Warren; Winslow (D)	Lawrence; O'Bryan; Branch (D)	John Adams; Gilmer (O)	James M. Leach (O)	F. Burton; Craige (D)	Zebulon; Vance (D)
37th (1861–1863)	Vacant during American Civil War							

=== 1863–1873: 7 seats ===
Following the 1860 census, North Carolina was apportioned seven seats.

Congress	District						
Congress	1st	2nd	3rd	4th	5th	6th	7th
38–39th (1863–1867)	Vacant during American Civil War						
40th (1867–1869)	Vacant during American Civil War						
40th (1867–1869)	John R. French (R)	David Heaton (R)	Oliver H. Dockery (R)	John T. Deweese (R)	Israel G. Lash (R)	Nathaniel Boyden (Con)	Alexander H. Jones (R)
41st (1869–1871)	Clinton L. Cobb (R)	David Heaton (R)	Oliver H. Dockery (R)	John T. Deweese (R)	Israel G. Lash (R)	Francis Edwin; Shober (D)	Alexander H. Jones (R)
41st (1869–1871)	Clinton L. Cobb (R)	Joseph Dixon (R)	Oliver H. Dockery (R)	John T. Deweese (R)	Israel G. Lash (R)	Francis Edwin; Shober (D)	Alexander H. Jones (R)
42nd (1871–1873)	Clinton L. Cobb (R)	Charles R. Thomas (R)	Alfred M. Waddell (D)	Sion H. Rogers (D)	James M. Leach (D)	Francis Edwin; Shober (D)	James C. Harper (D)

=== 1873–1883: 8 seats ===
Following the 1870 census, North Carolina was apportioned eight seats.

Congress	District							
Congress	1st	2nd	3rd	4th	5th	6th	7th	8th
43rd (1873–1875)	Clinton L. Cobb (R)	Charles R. Thomas (R)	Alfred Moore; Waddell (D)	William Alexander; Smith (R)	James M. Leach (D)	Thomas Samuel; Ashe (D)	William M. Robbins (D)	Robert B. Vance (D)
44th (1875–1877)	Jesse Johnson; Yeates (D)	John Adams; Hyman (R)	Alfred Moore; Waddell (D)	Joseph J. Davis (D)	Alfred Moore; Scales (D)	Thomas Samuel; Ashe (D)	William M. Robbins (D)	Robert B. Vance (D)
45th (1877–1879)	Jesse Johnson; Yeates (D)	Curtis Hooks; Brogden (R)	Alfred Moore; Waddell (D)	Joseph J. Davis (D)	Alfred Moore; Scales (D)	Thomas Samuel; Ashe (D)	William M. Robbins (D)	Robert B. Vance (D)
46th (1879–1881)	Joseph John; Martin (R)	William H. Kitchin (D)	Daniel Lindsay; Russell (GB)	Joseph J. Davis (D)	Alfred Moore; Scales (D)	Walter Leak; Steele (D)	Robert Franklin; Armfield (D)	Robert B. Vance (D)
46th (1879–1881)	Jesse Johnson; Yeates (D)	William H. Kitchin (D)	Daniel Lindsay; Russell (GB)	Joseph J. Davis (D)	Alfred Moore; Scales (D)	Walter Leak; Steele (D)	Robert Franklin; Armfield (D)	Robert B. Vance (D)
47th (1881–1883)	Louis C. Latham (D)	Orlando Hubbs (R)	John W. Shackelford (D)	William Ruffin; Cox (D)	Alfred Moore; Scales (D)	Clement Dowd (D)	Robert Franklin; Armfield (D)	Robert B. Vance (D)

=== 1883–1903: 9 seats ===
Following the 1880 census, North Carolina was apportioned nine seats. At first, the extra seat was elected at-large. Starting with the 1884 elections, the seats were redistricted and a ninth district was added.

Congress	District								At-large seat
Congress	1st	2nd	3rd	4th	5th	6th	7th	8th	At-large seat
48th (1883–1885)	Walter F. Pool (R)	James E. O'Hara (R)	Wharton J. Green (D)	William Ruffin; Cox (D)	Alfred Moore; Scales (D)	Clement Dowd (D)	Tyre York (ID)	Robert B. Vance (D)	Risden Tyler; Bennett (D)
48th (1883–1885)	Thomas Gregory; Skinner (D)	James E. O'Hara (R)	Wharton J. Green (D)	William Ruffin; Cox (D)	James W. Reid (D)	Clement Dowd (D)	Tyre York (ID)	Robert B. Vance (D)	Risden Tyler; Bennett (D)
48th (1883–1885)	Thomas Gregory; Skinner (D)	James E. O'Hara (R)	Wharton J. Green (D)	William Ruffin; Cox (D)	James W. Reid (D)	Clement Dowd (D)	Tyre York (ID)	Robert B. Vance (D)	9th district
49th (1885–1887)	Thomas Gregory; Skinner (D)	James E. O'Hara (R)	Wharton J. Green (D)	William Ruffin; Cox (D)	James W. Reid (D)	Risden Tyler; Bennett (D)	John S. Henderson (D)	William H. H. Cowles (D)	Thomas D. Johnston (D)
50th (1887–1889)	Thomas Gregory; Skinner (D)	F. M. Simmons (D)	Charles W. McClammy (D)	John Nichols (I)	John M. Brower (R)	Alfred Rowland (D)	John S. Henderson (D)	William H. H. Cowles (D)	Thomas D. Johnston (D)
51st (1889–1891)	Thomas Gregory; Skinner (D)	Henry P. Cheatham (R)	Charles W. McClammy (D)	Benjamin H. Bunn (D)	John M. Brower (R)	Alfred Rowland (D)	John S. Henderson (D)	William H. H. Cowles (D)	Hamilton G. Ewart (R)
52nd (1891–1893)	William A. B. Branch (D)	Henry P. Cheatham (R)	Benjamin F. Grady (D)	Benjamin H. Bunn (D)	A. H. A. Williams (D)	Sydenham B. Alexander (D)	John S. Henderson (D)	William H. H. Cowles (D)	William T. Crawford (D)
53rd (1893–1895)	William A. B. Branch (D)	Frederick A. Woodard (D)	Benjamin F. Grady (D)	Benjamin H. Bunn (D)	Thomas Settle (R)	Sydenham B. Alexander (D)	Alonzo C. Shuford (Pop)	William H. Bower (D)	William T. Crawford (D)
54th (1895–1897)	Harry; Skinner (Pop)	Frederick A. Woodard (D)	John G. Shaw (D)	William F. Strowd (Pop)	Thomas Settle (R)	James A. Lockhart (D)	Alonzo C. Shuford (Pop)	Romulus Z. Linney (R)	Richmond Pearson (R)
54th (1895–1897)	Harry; Skinner (Pop)	Frederick A. Woodard (D)	John G. Shaw (D)	William F. Strowd (Pop)	Thomas Settle (R)	Charles H. Martin (Pop)	Alonzo C. Shuford (Pop)	Romulus Z. Linney (R)	Richmond Pearson (R)
55th (1897–1899)	Harry; Skinner (Pop)	George H. White (R)	John Edgar; Fowler (Pop)	William F. Strowd (Pop)	William Walton; Kitchin (D)	Charles H. Martin (Pop)	Alonzo C. Shuford (Pop)	Romulus Z. Linney (R)	Richmond Pearson (R)
56th (1899–1901)	John Humphrey; Small (D)	George H. White (R)	Charles R. Thomas (D)	John W. Atwater (Pop)	William Walton; Kitchin (D)	John D. Bellamy (D)	Theodore F. Kluttz (D)	Romulus Z. Linney (R)	William T. Crawford (D)
56th (1899–1901)	John Humphrey; Small (D)	George H. White (R)	Charles R. Thomas (D)	John W. Atwater (Pop)	William Walton; Kitchin (D)	John D. Bellamy (D)	Theodore F. Kluttz (D)	Romulus Z. Linney (R)	Richmond Pearson (R)
57th (1901–1903)	John Humphrey; Small (D)	Claude Kitchin (D)	Charles R. Thomas (D)	Edward W. Pou (D)	William Walton; Kitchin (D)	John D. Bellamy (D)	Theodore F. Kluttz (D)	E. Spencer; Blackburn (R)	James M. Moody (R)

=== 1903–1933: 10 seats ===
Following the 1900 census, North Carolina was apportioned 10 seats.

Congress	District									
Congress	1st	2nd	3rd	4th	5th	6th	7th	8th	9th	10th
58th (1903–1905)	John; Humphrey; Small (D)	Claude; Kitchin (D)	Charles R. Thomas (D)	Edward W. Pou (D)	William Walton; Kitchin (D)	Gilbert B. Patterson (D)	Robert N. Page (D)	Theodore F. Kluttz (D)	Edwin Y. Webb (D)	James M. Gudger Jr. (D)
59th (1905–1907)	John; Humphrey; Small (D)	Claude; Kitchin (D)	Charles R. Thomas (D)	Edward W. Pou (D)	William Walton; Kitchin (D)	Gilbert B. Patterson (D)	Robert N. Page (D)	E. Spencer Blackburn (R)	Edwin Y. Webb (D)	James M. Gudger Jr. (D)
60th (1907–1909)	John; Humphrey; Small (D)	Claude; Kitchin (D)	Charles R. Thomas (D)	Edward W. Pou (D)	William Walton; Kitchin (D)	Hannibal; L. Godwin (D)	Robert N. Page (D)	Richard N. Hackett (D)	Edwin Y. Webb (D)	William T. Crawford (D)
61st (1909–1911)	John; Humphrey; Small (D)	Claude; Kitchin (D)	Charles R. Thomas (D)	Edward W. Pou (D)	John M. Morehead (R)	Hannibal; L. Godwin (D)	Robert N. Page (D)	Charles H. Cowles (R)	Edwin Y. Webb (D)	John G. Grant (R)
62nd (1911–1913)	John; Humphrey; Small (D)	Claude; Kitchin (D)	John M. Faison (D)	Edward W. Pou (D)	Charles Manly; Stedman (D)	Hannibal; L. Godwin (D)	Robert N. Page (D)	Bob; Doughton (D)	Edwin Y. Webb (D)	James M. Gudger Jr. (D)
63rd (1913–1915)	John; Humphrey; Small (D)	Claude; Kitchin (D)	John M. Faison (D)	Edward W. Pou (D)	Charles Manly; Stedman (D)	Hannibal; L. Godwin (D)	Robert N. Page (D)	Bob; Doughton (D)	Edwin Y. Webb (D)	James M. Gudger Jr. (D)
64th (1915–1917)	John; Humphrey; Small (D)	Claude; Kitchin (D)	George E. Hood (D)	Edward W. Pou (D)	Charles Manly; Stedman (D)	Hannibal; L. Godwin (D)	Robert N. Page (D)	Bob; Doughton (D)	Edwin Y. Webb (D)	James J. Britt (R)
65th (1917–1919)	John; Humphrey; Small (D)	Claude; Kitchin (D)	George E. Hood (D)	Edward W. Pou (D)	Charles Manly; Stedman (D)	Hannibal; L. Godwin (D)	Leonidas D. Robinson (D)	Bob; Doughton (D)	Edwin Y. Webb (D)	Zebulon Weaver (D)
65th (1917–1919)	John; Humphrey; Small (D)	Claude; Kitchin (D)	George E. Hood (D)	Edward W. Pou (D)	Charles Manly; Stedman (D)	Hannibal; L. Godwin (D)	Leonidas D. Robinson (D)	Bob; Doughton (D)	Edwin Y. Webb (D)	James J. Britt (R)
66th (1919–1921)	John; Humphrey; Small (D)	Claude; Kitchin (D)	Samuel M. Brinson (D)	Edward W. Pou (D)	Charles Manly; Stedman (D)	Hannibal; L. Godwin (D)	Leonidas D. Robinson (D)	Bob; Doughton (D)	Clyde R. Hoey (D)	Zebulon; Weaver (D)
67th (1921–1923)	Hallett Sydney; Ward (D)	Claude; Kitchin (D)	Samuel M. Brinson (D)	Edward W. Pou (D)	Charles Manly; Stedman (D)	Homer L. Lyon (D)	William C. Hammer (D)	Bob; Doughton (D)	Alfred L. Bulwinkle (D)	Zebulon; Weaver (D)
67th (1921–1923)	Hallett Sydney; Ward (D)	Claude; Kitchin (D)	Charles Laban; Abernethy (D)	Edward W. Pou (D)	Charles Manly; Stedman (D)	Homer L. Lyon (D)	William C. Hammer (D)	Bob; Doughton (D)	Alfred L. Bulwinkle (D)	Zebulon; Weaver (D)
68th (1923–1925)	Hallett Sydney; Ward (D)	John H. Kerr (D)	Charles Laban; Abernethy (D)	Edward W. Pou (D)	Charles Manly; Stedman (D)	Homer L. Lyon (D)	William C. Hammer (D)	Bob; Doughton (D)	Alfred L. Bulwinkle (D)	Zebulon; Weaver (D)
69th (1925–1927)	Lindsay C. Warren (D)	John H. Kerr (D)	Charles Laban; Abernethy (D)	Edward W. Pou (D)	Charles Manly; Stedman (D)	Homer L. Lyon (D)	William C. Hammer (D)	Bob; Doughton (D)	Alfred L. Bulwinkle (D)	Zebulon; Weaver (D)
70th (1927–1929)	Lindsay C. Warren (D)	John H. Kerr (D)	Charles Laban; Abernethy (D)	Edward W. Pou (D)	Charles Manly; Stedman (D)	Homer L. Lyon (D)	William C. Hammer (D)	Bob; Doughton (D)	Alfred L. Bulwinkle (D)	Zebulon; Weaver (D)
71st (1929–1931)	Lindsay C. Warren (D)	John H. Kerr (D)	Charles Laban; Abernethy (D)	Edward W. Pou (D)	Charles Manly; Stedman (D)	J. Bayard; Clark (D)	William C. Hammer (D)	Bob; Doughton (D)	Charles A. Jonas (R)	George M. Pritchard (R)
71st (1929–1931)	Lindsay C. Warren (D)	John H. Kerr (D)	Charles Laban; Abernethy (D)	Edward W. Pou (D)	Franklin Willis; Hancock Jr. (D)	J. Bayard; Clark (D)	Hinton James (D)	Bob; Doughton (D)	Charles A. Jonas (R)	George M. Pritchard (R)
72nd (1931–1933)	Lindsay C. Warren (D)	John H. Kerr (D)	Charles Laban; Abernethy (D)	Edward W. Pou (D)	Franklin Willis; Hancock Jr. (D)	J. Bayard; Clark (D)	Walter Lambeth (D)	Bob; Doughton (D)	Alfred L. Bulwinkle (D)	Zebulon Weaver (D)

=== 1933–1943: 11 seats ===
Following the 1930 census, North Carolina was apportioned 11 seats.

Congress	District										
Congress	1st	2nd	3rd	4th	5th	6th	7th	8th	9th	10th	11th
73rd (1933–1935)	Lindsay C. Warren (D)	John H. Kerr (D)	Charles Laban; Abernethy (D)	E. W. Pou (D)	Franklin W. Hancock Jr. (D)	William B. Umstead (D)	J. Bayard; Clark (D)	Walter; Lambeth (D)	Bob; Doughton (D)	Alfred L. Bulwinkle (D)	Zebulon; Weaver (D)
73rd (1933–1935)	Lindsay C. Warren (D)	John H. Kerr (D)	Charles Laban; Abernethy (D)	Harold D. Cooley (D)	Franklin W. Hancock Jr. (D)	William B. Umstead (D)	J. Bayard; Clark (D)	Walter; Lambeth (D)	Bob; Doughton (D)	Alfred L. Bulwinkle (D)	Zebulon; Weaver (D)
74th (1935–1937)	Lindsay C. Warren (D)	John H. Kerr (D)	Graham A. Barden (D)	Harold D. Cooley (D)	Franklin W. Hancock Jr. (D)	William B. Umstead (D)	J. Bayard; Clark (D)	Walter; Lambeth (D)	Bob; Doughton (D)	Alfred L. Bulwinkle (D)	Zebulon; Weaver (D)
75th (1937–1939)	Lindsay C. Warren (D)	John H. Kerr (D)	Graham A. Barden (D)	Harold D. Cooley (D)	Franklin W. Hancock Jr. (D)	William B. Umstead (D)	J. Bayard; Clark (D)	Walter; Lambeth (D)	Bob; Doughton (D)	Alfred L. Bulwinkle (D)	Zebulon; Weaver (D)
76th (1939–1941)	Lindsay C. Warren (D)	John H. Kerr (D)	Graham A. Barden (D)	Harold D. Cooley (D)	Alonzo D. Folger (D)	Carl T. Durham (D)	J. Bayard; Clark (D)	William O. Burgin (D)	Bob; Doughton (D)	Alfred L. Bulwinkle (D)	Zebulon; Weaver (D)
76th (1939–1941)	Herbert C. Bonner (D)	John H. Kerr (D)	Graham A. Barden (D)	Harold D. Cooley (D)	Alonzo D. Folger (D)	Carl T. Durham (D)	J. Bayard; Clark (D)	William O. Burgin (D)	Bob; Doughton (D)	Alfred L. Bulwinkle (D)	Zebulon; Weaver (D)
77th (1941–1943)	Herbert C. Bonner (D)	John H. Kerr (D)	Graham A. Barden (D)	Harold D. Cooley (D)	John H. Folger (D)	Carl T. Durham (D)	J. Bayard; Clark (D)	William O. Burgin (D)	Bob; Doughton (D)	Alfred L. Bulwinkle (D)	Zebulon; Weaver (D)

=== 1943–1963: 12 seats ===
Following the 1940 census, North Carolina was apportioned 12 seats.

Congress	District											
Congress	1st	2nd	3rd	4th	5th	6th	7th	8th	9th	10th	11th	12th
78th (1943–1945)	Herbert C. Bonner (D)	John H. Kerr (D)	Graham A. Barden (D)	Harold D. Cooley (D)	John Hamlin; Folger (D)	Carl T. Durham (D)	J. Bayard; Clark (D)	William O. Burgin (D)	Bob; Doughton (D)	Cameron A. Morrison (D)	Alfred L. Bulwinkle (D)	Zebulon; Weaver (D)
79th (1945–1947)	Herbert C. Bonner (D)	John H. Kerr (D)	Graham A. Barden (D)	Harold D. Cooley (D)	John Hamlin; Folger (D)	Carl T. Durham (D)	J. Bayard; Clark (D)	William O. Burgin (D)	Bob; Doughton (D)	Joseph Ervin (D)	Alfred L. Bulwinkle (D)	Zebulon; Weaver (D)
79th (1945–1947)	Herbert C. Bonner (D)	John H. Kerr (D)	Graham A. Barden (D)	Harold D. Cooley (D)	John Hamlin; Folger (D)	Carl T. Durham (D)	J. Bayard; Clark (D)	Eliza Jane Pratt (D)	Bob; Doughton (D)	Sam Ervin (D)	Alfred L. Bulwinkle (D)	Zebulon; Weaver (D)
80th (1947–1949)	Herbert C. Bonner (D)	John H. Kerr (D)	Graham A. Barden (D)	Harold D. Cooley (D)	John Hamlin; Folger (D)	Carl T. Durham (D)	J. Bayard; Clark (D)	Charles B. Deane (D)	Bob; Doughton (D)	Hamilton C. Jones (D)	Alfred L. Bulwinkle (D)	Monroe M. Redden (D)
81st (1949–1951)	Herbert C. Bonner (D)	John H. Kerr (D)	Graham A. Barden (D)	Harold D. Cooley (D)	R. Thurmond; Chatham (D)	Carl T. Durham (D)	F. Ertel; Carlyle (D)	Charles B. Deane (D)	Bob; Doughton (D)	Hamilton C. Jones (D)	Alfred L. Bulwinkle (D)	Monroe M. Redden (D)
81st (1949–1951)	Herbert C. Bonner (D)	John H. Kerr (D)	Graham A. Barden (D)	Harold D. Cooley (D)	R. Thurmond; Chatham (D)	Carl T. Durham (D)	F. Ertel; Carlyle (D)	Charles B. Deane (D)	Bob; Doughton (D)	Hamilton C. Jones (D)	Woodrow W. Jones (D)	Monroe M. Redden (D)
82nd (1951–1953)	Herbert C. Bonner (D)	John H. Kerr (D)	Graham A. Barden (D)	Harold D. Cooley (D)	R. Thurmond; Chatham (D)	Carl T. Durham (D)	F. Ertel; Carlyle (D)	Charles B. Deane (D)	Bob; Doughton (D)	Hamilton C. Jones (D)	Woodrow W. Jones (D)	Monroe M. Redden (D)
83rd (1953–1955)	Herbert C. Bonner (D)	Lawrence H. Fountain (D)	Graham A. Barden (D)	Harold D. Cooley (D)	R. Thurmond; Chatham (D)	Carl T. Durham (D)	F. Ertel; Carlyle (D)	Charles B. Deane (D)	Hugh Quincy; Alexander (D)	Charles R. Jonas (R)	Woodrow W. Jones (D)	George A. Shuford (D)
84th (1955–1957)	Herbert C. Bonner (D)	Lawrence H. Fountain (D)	Graham A. Barden (D)	Harold D. Cooley (D)	R. Thurmond; Chatham (D)	Carl T. Durham (D)	F. Ertel; Carlyle (D)	Charles B. Deane (D)	Hugh Quincy; Alexander (D)	Charles R. Jonas (R)	Woodrow W. Jones (D)	George A. Shuford (D)
85th (1957–1959)	Herbert C. Bonner (D)	Lawrence H. Fountain (D)	Graham A. Barden (D)	Harold D. Cooley (D)	Ralph James; Scott (D)	Carl T. Durham (D)	Alton; Lennon (D)	Alvin Paul; Kitchin (D)	Hugh Quincy; Alexander (D)	Charles R. Jonas (R)	Basil; Whitener (D)	George A. Shuford (D)
86th (1959–1961)	Herbert C. Bonner (D)	Lawrence H. Fountain (D)	Graham A. Barden (D)	Harold D. Cooley (D)	Ralph James; Scott (D)	Carl T. Durham (D)	Alton; Lennon (D)	Alvin Paul; Kitchin (D)	Hugh Quincy; Alexander (D)	Charles R. Jonas (R)	Basil; Whitener (D)	David M. Hall (D)
86th (1959–1961)	Herbert C. Bonner (D)	Lawrence H. Fountain (D)	Graham A. Barden (D)	Harold D. Cooley (D)	Ralph James; Scott (D)	Carl T. Durham (D)	Alton; Lennon (D)	Alvin Paul; Kitchin (D)	Hugh Quincy; Alexander (D)	Charles R. Jonas (R)	Basil; Whitener (D)	Roy A. Taylor (D)
87th (1961–1963)	Herbert C. Bonner (D)	Lawrence H. Fountain (D)	David N. Henderson (D)	Harold D. Cooley (D)	Ralph James; Scott (D)	Horace R. Kornegay (D)	Alton; Lennon (D)	Alvin Paul; Kitchin (D)	Hugh Quincy; Alexander (D)	Charles R. Jonas (R)	Basil; Whitener (D)	Roy A. Taylor (D)

=== 1963–1993: 11 seats ===
Following the 1960 census, North Carolina was apportioned 11 seats.

Congress	District										
Congress	1st	2nd	3rd	4th	5th	6th	7th	8th	9th	10th	11th
88th (1963–1965)	Herbert C. Bonner (D)	Lawrence H. Fountain (D)	David N. Henderson (D)	Harold D. Cooley (D)	Ralph James; Scott (D)	Horace R. Kornegay (D)	Alton; Lennon (D)	Charles R. Jonas (R)	Jim; Broyhill (R)	Basil; Whitener (D)	Roy A. Taylor (D)
89th (1965–1967)	Walter B. Jones Sr. (D)	Lawrence H. Fountain (D)	David N. Henderson (D)	Harold D. Cooley (D)	Ralph James; Scott (D)	Horace R. Kornegay (D)	Alton; Lennon (D)	Charles R. Jonas (R)	Jim; Broyhill (R)	Basil; Whitener (D)	Roy A. Taylor (D)
90th (1967–1969)	Walter B. Jones Sr. (D)	Lawrence H. Fountain (D)	David N. Henderson (D)	Jim; Gardner (R)	Nick; Galifianakis (D)	Horace R. Kornegay (D)	Alton; Lennon (D)	Charles R. Jonas (R)	Jim; Broyhill (R)	Basil; Whitener (D)	Roy A. Taylor (D)
91st (1969–1971)	Walter B. Jones Sr. (D)	Lawrence H. Fountain (D)	David N. Henderson (D)	Nick; Galifianakis (D)	Wilmer; Mizell (R)	L. Richardson; Preyer (D)	Alton; Lennon (D)	Earl B. Ruth (R)	Charles R. Jonas (R)	Jim; Broyhill (R)	Roy A. Taylor (D)
92nd (1971–1973)	Walter B. Jones Sr. (D)	Lawrence H. Fountain (D)	David N. Henderson (D)	Nick; Galifianakis (D)	Wilmer; Mizell (R)	L. Richardson; Preyer (D)	Alton; Lennon (D)	Earl B. Ruth (R)	Charles R. Jonas (R)	Jim; Broyhill (R)	Roy A. Taylor (D)
93rd (1973–1975)	Walter B. Jones Sr. (D)	Lawrence H. Fountain (D)	David N. Henderson (D)	Ike; Andrews (D)	Wilmer; Mizell (R)	L. Richardson; Preyer (D)	Charlie; Rose (D)	Earl B. Ruth (R)	James G. Martin (R)	Jim; Broyhill (R)	Roy A. Taylor (D)
94th (1975–1977)	Walter B. Jones Sr. (D)	Lawrence H. Fountain (D)	David N. Henderson (D)	Ike; Andrews (D)	Steve; Neal (D)	L. Richardson; Preyer (D)	Charlie; Rose (D)	Bill; Hefner (D)	James G. Martin (R)	Jim; Broyhill (R)	Roy A. Taylor (D)
95th (1977–1979)	Walter B. Jones Sr. (D)	Lawrence H. Fountain (D)	Charles; Whitley (D)	Ike; Andrews (D)	Steve; Neal (D)	L. Richardson; Preyer (D)	Charlie; Rose (D)	Bill; Hefner (D)	James G. Martin (R)	Jim; Broyhill (R)	V. Lamar; Gudger (D)
96th (1979–1981)	Walter B. Jones Sr. (D)	Lawrence H. Fountain (D)	Charles; Whitley (D)	Ike; Andrews (D)	Steve; Neal (D)	L. Richardson; Preyer (D)	Charlie; Rose (D)	Bill; Hefner (D)	James G. Martin (R)	Jim; Broyhill (R)	V. Lamar; Gudger (D)
97th (1981–1983)	Walter B. Jones Sr. (D)	Lawrence H. Fountain (D)	Charles; Whitley (D)	Ike; Andrews (D)	Steve; Neal (D)	Gene; Johnston (R)	Charlie; Rose (D)	Bill; Hefner (D)	James G. Martin (R)	Jim; Broyhill (R)	Bill; Hendon (R)
98th (1983–1985)	Walter B. Jones Sr. (D)	Tim; Valentine (D)	Charles; Whitley (D)	Ike; Andrews (D)	Steve; Neal (D)	Robin; Britt (D)	Charlie; Rose (D)	Bill; Hefner (D)	James G. Martin (R)	Jim; Broyhill (R)	Jamie; Clarke (D)
99th (1985–1987)	Walter B. Jones Sr. (D)	Tim; Valentine (D)	Charles; Whitley (D)	Bill Cobey (R)	Steve; Neal (D)	Howard; Coble (R)	Charlie; Rose (D)	Bill; Hefner (D)	Alex; McMillan (R)	Jim; Broyhill (R)	Bill Hendon (R)
100th (1987–1989)	Walter B. Jones Sr. (D)	Tim; Valentine (D)	Martin; Lancaster (D)	David; Price (D)	Steve; Neal (D)	Howard; Coble (R)	Charlie; Rose (D)	Bill; Hefner (D)	Alex; McMillan (R)	Cass; Ballenger (R)	Jamie; Clarke (D)
101st (1989–1991)	Walter B. Jones Sr. (D)	Tim; Valentine (D)	Martin; Lancaster (D)	David; Price (D)	Steve; Neal (D)	Howard; Coble (R)	Charlie; Rose (D)	Bill; Hefner (D)	Alex; McMillan (R)	Cass; Ballenger (R)	Jamie; Clarke (D)
102nd (1991–1993)	Walter B. Jones Sr. (D)	Tim; Valentine (D)	Martin; Lancaster (D)	David; Price (D)	Steve; Neal (D)	Howard; Coble (R)	Charlie; Rose (D)	Bill; Hefner (D)	Alex; McMillan (R)	Cass; Ballenger (R)	Charles; Taylor (R)

=== 1993–2003: 12 seats ===
Following the 1990 census, North Carolina was apportioned 12 seats.

Congress	District											
Congress	1st	2nd	3rd	4th	5th	6th	7th	8th	9th	10th	11th	12th
103rd (1993–1995)	Eva; Clayton (D)	Tim; Valentine (D)	Martin; Lancaster (D)	David; Price (D)	Steve; Neal (D)	Howard; Coble (R)	Charlie; Rose (D)	Bill; Hefner (D)	Alex; McMillan (R)	Cass; Ballenger (R)	Charles; Taylor (R)	Mel; Watt (D)
104th (1995–1997)	Eva; Clayton (D)	David Funderburk (R)	Walter B. Jones Jr. (R)	Fred; Heineman (R)	Richard; Burr (R)	Howard; Coble (R)	Charlie; Rose (D)	Bill; Hefner (D)	Sue; Myrick (R)	Cass; Ballenger (R)	Charles; Taylor (R)	Mel; Watt (D)
105th (1997–1999)	Eva; Clayton (D)	Bob; Etheridge (D)	Walter B. Jones Jr. (R)	David; Price (D)	Richard; Burr (R)	Howard; Coble (R)	Mike; McIntyre (D)	Bill; Hefner (D)	Sue; Myrick (R)	Cass; Ballenger (R)	Charles; Taylor (R)	Mel; Watt (D)
106th (1999–2001)	Eva; Clayton (D)	Bob; Etheridge (D)	Walter B. Jones Jr. (R)	David; Price (D)	Richard; Burr (R)	Howard; Coble (R)	Mike; McIntyre (D)	Robin; Hayes (R)	Sue; Myrick (R)	Cass; Ballenger (R)	Charles; Taylor (R)	Mel; Watt (D)
107th (2001–2003)	Eva; Clayton (D)	Bob; Etheridge (D)	Walter B. Jones Jr. (R)	David; Price (D)	Richard; Burr (R)	Howard; Coble (R)	Mike; McIntyre (D)	Robin; Hayes (R)	Sue; Myrick (R)	Cass; Ballenger (R)	Charles; Taylor (R)	Mel; Watt (D)

=== 2003–2023: 13 seats ===
Following the 2000 census, North Carolina was apportioned 13 seats.

Congress	District												
Congress	1st	2nd	3rd	4th	5th	6th	7th	8th	9th	10th	11th	12th	13th
108th (2003–2005)	Frank; Ballance (D)	Bob; Etheridge (D)	Walter; Jones (R)	David; Price (D)	Richard; Burr (R)	Howard; Coble (R)	Mike; McIntyre (D)	Robin; Hayes (R)	Sue; Myrick (R)	Cass; Ballenger (R)	Charles; Taylor (R)	Mel; Watt (D)	Brad; Miller (D)
108th (2003–2005)	G. K. Butterfield (D)	Bob; Etheridge (D)	Walter; Jones (R)	David; Price (D)	Richard; Burr (R)	Howard; Coble (R)	Mike; McIntyre (D)	Robin; Hayes (R)	Sue; Myrick (R)	Cass; Ballenger (R)	Charles; Taylor (R)	Mel; Watt (D)	Brad; Miller (D)
109th (2005–2007)	G. K. Butterfield (D)	Bob; Etheridge (D)	Walter; Jones (R)	David; Price (D)	Virginia; Foxx (R)	Howard; Coble (R)	Mike; McIntyre (D)	Robin; Hayes (R)	Sue; Myrick (R)	Patrick; McHenry (R)	Charles; Taylor (R)	Mel; Watt (D)	Brad; Miller (D)
110th (2007–2009)	G. K. Butterfield (D)	Bob; Etheridge (D)	Walter; Jones (R)	David; Price (D)	Virginia; Foxx (R)	Howard; Coble (R)	Mike; McIntyre (D)	Robin; Hayes (R)	Sue; Myrick (R)	Patrick; McHenry (R)	Heath; Shuler (D)	Mel; Watt (D)	Brad; Miller (D)
111th (2009–2011)	G. K. Butterfield (D)	Bob; Etheridge (D)	Walter; Jones (R)	David; Price (D)	Virginia; Foxx (R)	Howard; Coble (R)	Mike; McIntyre (D)	Larry; Kissell (D)	Sue; Myrick (R)	Patrick; McHenry (R)	Heath; Shuler (D)	Mel; Watt (D)	Brad; Miller (D)
112th (2011–2013)	G. K. Butterfield (D)	Renee; Ellmers (R)	Walter; Jones (R)	David; Price (D)	Virginia; Foxx (R)	Howard; Coble (R)	Mike; McIntyre (D)	Larry; Kissell (D)	Sue; Myrick (R)	Patrick; McHenry (R)	Heath; Shuler (D)	Mel; Watt (D)	Brad; Miller (D)
113th (2013–2015)	G. K. Butterfield (D)	Renee; Ellmers (R)	Walter; Jones (R)	David; Price (D)	Virginia; Foxx (R)	Howard; Coble (R)	Mike; McIntyre (D)	Richard; Hudson (R)	Robert; Pittenger (R)	Patrick; McHenry (R)	Mark; Meadows (R)	Mel; Watt (D)	George; Holding (R)
113th (2013–2015)	G. K. Butterfield (D)	Renee; Ellmers (R)	Walter; Jones (R)	David; Price (D)	Virginia; Foxx (R)	Howard; Coble (R)	Mike; McIntyre (D)	Richard; Hudson (R)	Robert; Pittenger (R)	Patrick; McHenry (R)	Mark; Meadows (R)	Alma; Adams (D)	George; Holding (R)
114th (2015–2017)	G. K. Butterfield (D)	Renee; Ellmers (R)	Walter; Jones (R)	David; Price (D)	Virginia; Foxx (R)	Mark; Walker (R)	David; Rouzer (R)	Richard; Hudson (R)	Robert; Pittenger (R)	Patrick; McHenry (R)	Mark; Meadows (R)	Alma; Adams (D)	George; Holding (R)
115th (2017–2019)	G. K. Butterfield (D)	George; Holding (R)	Walter; Jones (R)	David; Price (D)	Virginia; Foxx (R)	Mark; Walker (R)	David; Rouzer (R)	Richard; Hudson (R)	Robert; Pittenger (R)	Patrick; McHenry (R)	Mark; Meadows (R)	Alma; Adams (D)	Ted; Budd (R)
116th (2019–2021)	G. K. Butterfield (D)	George; Holding (R)	Walter; Jones (R)	David; Price (D)	Virginia; Foxx (R)	Mark; Walker (R)	David; Rouzer (R)	Richard; Hudson (R)	Dan; Bishop (R)	Patrick; McHenry (R)	Mark; Meadows (R)	Alma; Adams (D)	Ted; Budd (R)
116th (2019–2021)	G. K. Butterfield (D)	George; Holding (R)	Greg; Murphy (R)	David; Price (D)	Virginia; Foxx (R)	Mark; Walker (R)	David; Rouzer (R)	Richard; Hudson (R)	Dan; Bishop (R)	Patrick; McHenry (R)	Mark; Meadows (R)	Alma; Adams (D)	Ted; Budd (R)
117th (2021–2023)	G. K. Butterfield (D)	Deborah; Ross (D)	Greg; Murphy (R)	David; Price (D)	Virginia; Foxx (R)	Kathy; Manning (D)	David; Rouzer (R)	Richard; Hudson (R)	Dan; Bishop (R)	Patrick; McHenry (R)	Madison; Cawthorn (R)	Alma; Adams (D)	Ted; Budd (R)

=== 2023–present: 14 seats ===
Since the 2020 census, North Carolina has been apportioned 14 seats.

Congress	District													
Congress	1st	2nd	3rd	4th	5th	6th	7th	8th	9th	10th	11th	12th	13th	14th
118th (2023–2025)	Don; Davis (D)	Deborah; Ross (D)	Greg; Murphy (R)	Valerie; Foushee (D)	Virginia; Foxx (R)	Kathy; Manning (D)	David; Rouzer (R)	Dan; Bishop (R)	Richard; Hudson (R)	Patrick; McHenry (R)	Chuck; Edwards (R)	Alma; Adams (D)	Wiley; Nickel (D)	Jeff; Jackson (D)
119th (2025–2027)	Don; Davis (D)	Deborah; Ross (D)	Greg; Murphy (R)	Valerie; Foushee (D)	Virginia; Foxx (R)	Addison; McDowell (R)	David; Rouzer (R)	Mark; Harris (R)	Richard; Hudson (R)	Pat; Harrigan (R)	Chuck; Edwards (R)	Alma; Adams (D)	Brad; Knott (R)	Tim; Moore (R)
120th (2027–2029)	Don; Davis (D)	Deborah; Ross (D)	Raymond; Smith Jr. (D)	Valerie; Foushee (D)	Chuck; Hubbard (D)	Cyril; Jefferson (D)	David; Rouzer (R)	Mark; Harris (R)	Richard; Ojeda (D)	Pat; Harrigan (R)	Jamie; Ager (D)	Alma; Adams (D)	Paul; Barringer (D)	LaKesha; Womack (D)

== U.S. Senate ==
Current U.S. senators from North Carolina
North Carolina CPVI (2025): R+1	Class II senator	Class III senator
North Carolina CPVI (2025): R+1	Thom Tillis (Senior senator) (Huntersville)	Ted Budd (Junior senator) (Advance)
Party	Republican	Republican
Incumbent since	January 3, 2015	January 3, 2023

Class II senator	Congress	Class III senator
Samuel Johnston (PA)	1st (1789–1791)	Benjamin Hawkins (PA)
Samuel Johnston (PA)	2nd (1791–1793)	Benjamin Hawkins (PA)
Alexander Martin (AA)	3rd (1793–1795)	Benjamin Hawkins (PA)
Alexander Martin (DR)	4th (1795–1797)	Timothy Bloodworth (DR)
Alexander Martin (DR)	5th (1797–1799)	Timothy Bloodworth (DR)
Jesse Franklin (DR)	6th (1799–1801)	Timothy Bloodworth (DR)
Jesse Franklin (DR)	7th (1801–1803)	David Stone (DR)
Jesse Franklin (DR)	8th (1803–1805)	David Stone (DR)
James Turner (DR)	9th (1805–1807)	David Stone (DR)
James Turner (DR)	10th (1807–1809)	Jesse Franklin (DR)
James Turner (DR)	11th (1809–1811)	Jesse Franklin (DR)
James Turner (DR)	12th (1811–1813)	Jesse Franklin (DR)
James Turner (DR)	13th (1813–1815)	David Stone (DR)
James Turner (DR)	13th (1813–1815)	Francis Locke Jr. (DR)
James Turner (DR)	14th (1815–1817)	Francis Locke Jr. (DR)
Montfort Stokes (DR)	14th (1815–1817)	Nathaniel Macon (DR)
Montfort Stokes (DR)	15th (1817–1819)	Nathaniel Macon (DR)
Montfort Stokes (DR)	16th (1819–1821)	Nathaniel Macon (DR)
Montfort Stokes (DR)	17th (1821–1823)	Nathaniel Macon (DR)
John Branch (DR)	18th (1823–1825)	Nathaniel Macon (DR)
John Branch (J)	19th (1825–1827)	Nathaniel Macon (J)
John Branch (J)	20th (1827–1829)	Nathaniel Macon (J)
John Branch (J)	20th (1827–1829)	James Iredell Jr. (J)
John Branch (J)	21st (1829–1831)	James Iredell Jr. (J)
Bedford Brown (J)	21st (1829–1831)	James Iredell Jr. (J)
Bedford Brown (J)	22nd (1831–1833)	Willie P. Mangum (D)
Bedford Brown (J)	23rd (1833–1835)	Willie P. Mangum (NR)
Bedford Brown (J)	24th (1835–1837)	Willie P. Mangum (NR)
Bedford Brown (J)	24th (1835–1837)	Robert Strange (J)
Bedford Brown (D)	25th (1837–1839)	Robert Strange (D)
Bedford Brown (D)	26th (1839–1841)	Robert Strange (D)
Willie P. Mangum (W)	26th (1839–1841)	William Alexander Graham (W)
Willie P. Mangum (W)	27th (1841–1843)	William Alexander Graham (W)
Willie P. Mangum (W)	28th (1843–1845)	William Henry Haywood Jr. (D)
Willie P. Mangum (W)	29th (1845–1847)	William Henry Haywood Jr. (D)
Willie P. Mangum (W)	29th (1845–1847)	George Edmund Badger (W)
Willie P. Mangum (W)	30th (1847–1849)	George Edmund Badger (W)
Willie P. Mangum (W)	31st (1849–1851)	George Edmund Badger (W)
Willie P. Mangum (W)	32nd (1851–1853)	George Edmund Badger (W)
David Settle Reid (D)	33rd (1853–1855)	George Edmund Badger (W)
David Settle Reid (D)	34th (1855–1857)	Asa Biggs (D)
David Settle Reid (D)	35th (1857–1859)	Asa Biggs (D)
David Settle Reid (D)	35th (1857–1859)	Thomas L. Clingman (D)
Thomas Bragg (D)	36th (1859–1861)	Thomas L. Clingman (D)
Thomas Bragg (D)	37th (1861–1863)	Thomas L. Clingman (D)
vacant	37th (1861–1863)	vacant
vacant	38th (1863–1865)	vacant
vacant	39th (1865–1867)	vacant
vacant	40th (1867–1869)	vacant
Joseph Carter Abbott (R)	40th (1867–1869)	John Pool (R)
Joseph Carter Abbott (R)	41st (1869–1871)	John Pool (R)
Matt W. Ransom (D)	42nd (1871–1873)	John Pool (R)
Matt W. Ransom (D)	43rd (1873–1875)	Augustus Summerfield; Merrimon (D)
Matt W. Ransom (D)	44th (1875–1877)	Augustus Summerfield; Merrimon (D)
Matt W. Ransom (D)	45th (1877–1879)	Augustus Summerfield; Merrimon (D)
Matt W. Ransom (D)	46th (1879–1881)	Zebulon Vance (D)
Matt W. Ransom (D)	47th (1881–1883)	Zebulon Vance (D)
Matt W. Ransom (D)	48th (1883–1885)	Zebulon Vance (D)
Matt W. Ransom (D)	49th (1885–1887)	Zebulon Vance (D)
Matt W. Ransom (D)	50th (1887–1889)	Zebulon Vance (D)
Matt W. Ransom (D)	51st (1889–1891)	Zebulon Vance (D)
Matt W. Ransom (D)	52nd (1891–1893)	Zebulon Vance (D)
Matt W. Ransom (D)	53rd (1893–1895)	Zebulon Vance (D)
Matt W. Ransom (D)	53rd (1893–1895)	Thomas J. Jarvis (D)
Matt W. Ransom (D)	53rd (1893–1895)	Jeter C. Pritchard (R)
Marion Butler (Pop)	54th (1895–1897)	Jeter C. Pritchard (R)
Marion Butler (Pop)	55th (1897–1899)	Jeter C. Pritchard (R)
Marion Butler (Pop)	56th (1899–1901)	Jeter C. Pritchard (R)
F. M. Simmons (D)	57th (1901–1903)	Jeter C. Pritchard (R)
F. M. Simmons (D)	58th (1903–1905)	Lee S. Overman (D)
F. M. Simmons (D)	59th (1905–1907)	Lee S. Overman (D)
F. M. Simmons (D)	60th (1907–1909)	Lee S. Overman (D)
F. M. Simmons (D)	61st (1909–1911)	Lee S. Overman (D)
F. M. Simmons (D)	62nd (1911–1913)	Lee S. Overman (D)
F. M. Simmons (D)	63rd (1913–1915)	Lee S. Overman (D)
F. M. Simmons (D)	64th (1915–1917)	Lee S. Overman (D)
F. M. Simmons (D)	65th (1917–1919)	Lee S. Overman (D)
F. M. Simmons (D)	66th (1919–1921)	Lee S. Overman (D)
F. M. Simmons (D)	67th (1921–1923)	Lee S. Overman (D)
F. M. Simmons (D)	68th (1923–1925)	Lee S. Overman (D)
F. M. Simmons (D)	69th (1925–1927)	Lee S. Overman (D)
F. M. Simmons (D)	70th (1927–1929)	Lee S. Overman (D)
F. M. Simmons (D)	71st (1929–1931)	Lee S. Overman (D)
F. M. Simmons (D)	71st (1929–1931)	Cameron A. Morrison (D)
Josiah Bailey (D)	72nd (1931–1933)	Cameron A. Morrison (D)
Josiah Bailey (D)	72nd (1931–1933)	Robert R. Reynolds (D)
Josiah Bailey (D)	73rd (1933–1935)	Robert R. Reynolds (D)
Josiah Bailey (D)	74th (1935–1937)	Robert R. Reynolds (D)
Josiah Bailey (D)	75th (1937–1939)	Robert R. Reynolds (D)
Josiah Bailey (D)	76th (1939–1941)	Robert R. Reynolds (D)
Josiah Bailey (D)	77th (1941–1943)	Robert R. Reynolds (D)
Josiah Bailey (D)	78th (1943–1945)	Robert R. Reynolds (D)
Josiah Bailey (D)	79th (1945–1947)	Clyde R. Hoey (D)
William B. Umstead (D)	79th (1945–1947)	Clyde R. Hoey (D)
William B. Umstead (D)	80th (1947–1949)	Clyde R. Hoey (D)
J. Melville Broughton (D)	80th (1947–1949)	Clyde R. Hoey (D)
J. Melville Broughton (D)	81st (1949–1951)	Clyde R. Hoey (D)
Frank Porter Graham (D)	81st (1949–1951)	Clyde R. Hoey (D)
Willis Smith (D)	81st (1949–1951)	Clyde R. Hoey (D)
Willis Smith (D)	82nd (1951–1953)	Clyde R. Hoey (D)
Willis Smith (D)	83rd (1953–1955)	Clyde R. Hoey (D)
Alton Lennon (D)	83rd (1953–1955)	Sam Ervin (D)
W. Kerr Scott (D)	83rd (1953–1955)	Sam Ervin (D)
W. Kerr Scott (D)	84th (1955–1957)	Sam Ervin (D)
W. Kerr Scott (D)	85th (1957–1959)	Sam Ervin (D)
B. Everett Jordan (D)	85th (1957–1959)	Sam Ervin (D)
B. Everett Jordan (D)	86th (1959–1961)	Sam Ervin (D)
B. Everett Jordan (D)	87th (1961–1963)	Sam Ervin (D)
B. Everett Jordan (D)	88th (1963–1965)	Sam Ervin (D)
B. Everett Jordan (D)	89th (1965–1967)	Sam Ervin (D)
B. Everett Jordan (D)	90th (1967–1969)	Sam Ervin (D)
B. Everett Jordan (D)	91st (1969–1971)	Sam Ervin (D)
B. Everett Jordan (D)	92nd (1971–1973)	Sam Ervin (D)
Jesse Helms (R)	93rd (1973–1975)	Sam Ervin (D)
Jesse Helms (R)	94th (1975–1977)	Robert Burren Morgan (D)
Jesse Helms (R)	95th (1977–1979)	Robert Burren Morgan (D)
Jesse Helms (R)	96th (1979–1981)	Robert Burren Morgan (D)
Jesse Helms (R)	97th (1981–1983)	John Porter East(R)
Jesse Helms (R)	98th (1983–1985)	John Porter East(R)
Jesse Helms (R)	99th (1985–1987)	John Porter East(R)
Jesse Helms (R)	99th (1985–1987)	Jim Broyhill (R)
Jesse Helms (R)	99th (1985–1987)	Terry Sanford (D)
Jesse Helms (R)	100th (1987–1989)	Terry Sanford (D)
Jesse Helms (R)	101st (1989–1991)	Terry Sanford (D)
Jesse Helms (R)	102nd (1991–1993)	Terry Sanford (D)
Jesse Helms (R)	103rd (1993–1995)	Lauch Faircloth (R)
Jesse Helms (R)	104th (1995–1997)	Lauch Faircloth (R)
Jesse Helms (R)	105th (1997–1999)	Lauch Faircloth (R)
Jesse Helms (R)	106th (1999–2001)	John Edwards (D)
Jesse Helms (R)	107th (2001–2003)	John Edwards (D)
Elizabeth Dole (R)	108th (2003–2005)	John Edwards (D)
Elizabeth Dole (R)	109th (2005–2007)	Richard Burr (R)
Elizabeth Dole (R)	110th (2007–2009)	Richard Burr (R)
Kay Hagan (D)	111th (2009–2011)	Richard Burr (R)
Kay Hagan (D)	112th (2011–2013)	Richard Burr (R)
Kay Hagan (D)	113th (2013–2015)	Richard Burr (R)
Thom Tillis (R)	114th (2015–2017)	Richard Burr (R)
Thom Tillis (R)	115th (2017–2019)	Richard Burr (R)
Thom Tillis (R)	116th (2019–2021)	Richard Burr (R)
Thom Tillis (R)	117th (2021–2023)	Richard Burr (R)
Thom Tillis (R)	118th (2023–2025)	Ted Budd (R)
Thom Tillis (R)	119th (2025–2027)	Ted Budd (R)
Roy Cooper (D)	120th (2027–2029)	Ted Budd (R)

== Key ==
Anti-Administration (AA)
Conservative (Con)
Democratic (D)
Democratic-Republican (DR)
Federalist (F)
Pro-Administration (PA)
Greenback (GB)
Independent Democrat (ID)
Jacksonian (J)
Know Nothing (KN)
National Republican (NR)
Opposition Southern (O)
Populist (Pop)
Republican (R)
Whig (W)
Independent (I)

== See also ==
- North Carolina's congressional districts
- List of United States congressional districts
- Political party strength in North Carolina
