= List of United States representatives from North Carolina =

The following is an alphabetical list of United States representatives from the state of North Carolina. For chronological tables of members of both houses of the United States Congress from the state (through the present day), see North Carolina's congressional delegations. The list of names should be complete, but other data may be incomplete.

== Current representatives ==
As of January 3, 2025

- 1st district: Don Davis (D) (since 2023)
- 2nd district: Deborah K. Ross (D) (since 2021)
- 3rd district: Greg Murphy (R) (since 2019)
- 4th district: Valerie Foushee (D) (since 2023)
- 5th district: Virginia Foxx (R) (since 2005)
- 6th district: Addison McDowell (R) (since 2025)
- 7th district: David Rouzer (R) (since 2015)
- 8th district: Mark Harris (R) (since 2025)
- 9th district: Richard Hudson (R) (since 2013)
- 10th district: Pat Harrigan (R) (since 2025)
- 11th district: Chuck Edwards (R) (since 2023)
- 12th district: Alma Adams (D) (since 2014)
- 13th district: Brad Knott (R) (since 2025)
- 14th district: Tim Moore (R) (since 2025)

== List of members ==
Member	Party	Years	District	Electoral history
Charles L. Abernethy	Democratic	November 7, 1922 – January 3, 1935	3rd	[data missing]
Alma Adams	Democratic	November 12, 2014 – present	12th	Incumbent
Evan S. Alexander	Democratic-Republican	February 24, 1806 – March 3, 1809	10th	[data missing]
Hugh Q. Alexander	Democratic	January 3, 1953 – January 3, 1963	9th	[data missing]
Nathaniel Alexander	Democratic-Republican	March 4, 1803 – November, 1805	10th	Resigned after being elected Governor
Sydenham B. Alexander	Democratic	March 4, 1891 – March 3, 1895	6th	[data missing]
Willis Alston	Democratic-Republican	March 4, 1799 – March 3, 1803	9th	[data missing]
Willis Alston	Democratic-Republican	March 4, 1803 – March 3, 1815	2nd	[data missing]
Willis Alston	Jacksonian	March 4, 1825 – March 3, 1831	2nd	[data missing]
Ike F. Andrews	Democratic	January 3, 1973 – January 3, 1985	4th	[data missing]
Robert F. Armfield	Democratic	March 4, 1879 – March 3, 1883	7th	[data missing]
Archibald H. Arrington	Democratic	March 4, 1841 – March 3, 1843	6th	[data missing]
Archibald H. Arrington	Democratic	March 4, 1843 – March 3, 1845	8th	[data missing]
John B. Ashe	Anti-Administration	March 24, 1790 – March 3, 1791	1st	[data missing]
John B. Ashe	Anti-Administration	March 4, 1791 – March 3, 1793	3rd	[data missing]
Thomas S. Ashe	Democratic	March 4, 1873 – March 3, 1877	6th	[data missing]
William S. Ashe	Democratic	March 4, 1849 – March 3, 1853	7th	[data missing]
William S. Ashe	Democratic	March 4, 1853 – March 3, 1855	3rd	[data missing]
John W. Atwater	Independent Populist	March 4, 1899 – March 3, 1901	4th	[data missing]
Frank Ballance	Democratic	January 3, 2003 – June 11, 2004	1st	Resigned
Cass Ballenger	Republican	November 4, 1986 – January 3, 2005	10th	[data missing]
Graham A. Barden	Democratic	January 3, 1935 – January 3, 1961	3rd	[data missing]
Daniel L. Barringer	Jacksonian	March 4, 1826 – March 3, 1833	8th	[data missing]
Daniel L. Barringer	Anti-Jacksonian	March 4, 1833 – March 3, 1835	8th	[data missing]
Daniel M. Barringer	Whig	March 4, 1843 – March 3, 1847	2nd	[data missing]
Daniel M. Barringer	Whig	March 4, 1847 – March 3, 1849	3rd	[data missing]
John D. Bellamy	Democratic	March 4, 1899 – March 3, 1903	6th	[data missing]
Risden T. Bennett	Democratic	March 4, 1883 – March 3, 1885	At-large	[data missing]
Risden T. Bennett	Democratic	March 4, 1885 – March 3, 1887	6th	[data missing]
Lauchlin Bethune	Jacksonian	March 4, 1831 – March 3, 1833	7th	[data missing]
Asa Biggs	Democratic	March 4, 1845 – March 3, 1847	9th	[data missing]
Dan Bishop	Republican	September 10, 2019 – January 3, 2023	9th	Redistricted to the 8th district.
Dan Bishop	Republican	January 3, 2023 – January 3, 2025	8th	Redistricted from the 9th district and re-elected in 2022. Retired to run for North Carolina attorney general.
Edmond S. Blackburn	Republican	March 4, 1901 – March 3, 1903	8th	[data missing]
Edmond S. Blackburn	Republican	March 4, 1905 – March 3, 1907	8th	[data missing]
William Blackledge	Democratic-Republican	March 4, 1803 – March 3, 1809	4th	[data missing]
William Blackledge	Democratic-Republican	March 4, 1811 – March 3, 1813	4th	[data missing]
William S. Blackledge	Democratic-Republican	February 7, 1821 – March 3, 1823	4th	[data missing]
Timothy Bloodworth	Anti-Administration	April 6, 1790 – March 3, 1791	3rd	[data missing]
Thomas Blount	Anti-Administration	March 4, 1793 – March 3, 1795	9th	[data missing]
Thomas Blount	Democratic-Republican	March 4, 1795 – March 3, 1799	9th	[data missing]
Thomas Blount	Democratic-Republican	March 4, 1805 – March 3, 1809	3rd	[data missing]
Thomas Blount	Democratic-Republican	March 4, 1811 – February 7, 1812	3rd	Died
Herbert C. Bonner	Democratic	November 5, 1940 – November 7, 1965	1st	Died
William H. Bower	Democratic	March 4, 1893 – March 3, 1895	8th	[data missing]
Nathaniel Boyden	Whig	March 4, 1847 – March 3, 1849	2nd	[data missing]
Nathaniel Boyden	Conservative	July 13, 1868 – March 3, 1869	6th	[data missing]
John Branch	Jacksonian	May 12, 1831 – March 3, 1833	2nd	[data missing]
Lawrence O. Branch	Democratic	March 4, 1855 – March 3, 1861	4th	[data missing]
William A. B. Branch	Democratic	March 4, 1891 – March 3, 1895	1st	[data missing]
Samuel M. Brinson	Democratic	March 4, 1919 – April 13, 1922	3rd	Died
Charles R. Britt	Democratic	January 3, 1983 – January 3, 1985	6th	[data missing]
James J. Britt	Republican	March 4, 1915 – March 3, 1917	10th	[data missing]
James J. Britt	Republican	March 1, 1919 - March 4, 1919	10th	[data missing]
Curtis H. Brogden	Republican	March 4, 1877 – March 3, 1879	2nd	[data missing]
John M. Brower	Republican	March 4, 1887 – March 3, 1891	5th	[data missing]
Jim Broyhill	Republican	January 3, 1963 – January 3, 1969	9th	Resigned to become U.S. senator
Jim Broyhill	Republican	January 3, 1969 – July 14, 1986	10th	Resigned to become U.S. senator
John H. Bryan	Jacksonian	March 4, 1825 – March 3, 1827	4th	[data missing]
John H. Bryan	Anti-Jacksonian	March 4, 1827 – March 3, 1829	4th	[data missing]
Joseph H. Bryan	Democratic-Republican	March 4, 1815 – March 3, 1819	2nd	[data missing]
Nathan Bryan	Democratic-Republican	March 4, 1795 – June 4, 1798	10th	Died
Ted Budd	Republican	January 3, 2017 – January 3, 2023	13th	Retired to run for U.S. senator.
Alfred L. Bulwinkle	Democratic	March 4, 1921 – March 3, 1929	9th	[data missing]
Alfred L. Bulwinkle	Democratic	March 4, 1931 – March 3, 1933	9th	Died
Alfred L. Bulwinkle	Democratic	March 4, 1933 – January 3, 1943	10th	Died
Alfred L. Bulwinkle	Democratic	January 3, 1943 – August 31, 1950	11th	Died
Benjamin H. Bunn	Democratic	March 4, 1889 – March 3, 1895	4th	[data missing]
Dempsey Burges	Democratic-Republican	March 4, 1795 – March 3, 1799	8th	[data missing]
William O. Burgin	Democratic	January 3, 1939 – April 11, 1946	8th	Died
Richard Burr	Republican	January 3, 1995 – January 3, 2005	5th	[data missing]
Hutchins G. Burton	Democratic-Republican	December 6, 1819 – March 23, 1824	2nd	[data missing] Resigned after being elected Governor of North Carolina
G. K. Butterfield	Democratic	July 20, 2004 – December 30, 2022	1st	Retired and resigned early
Jesse A. Bynum	Jacksonian	March 4, 1833 – March 3, 1837	2nd	[data missing]
Jesse A. Bynum	Democratic	March 4, 1837 – March 4, 1841	2nd	[data missing]
Greene W. Caldwell	Democratic	March 4, 1841 – March 3, 1843	11th	[data missing]
Joseph P. Caldwell	Whig	March 4, 1849 – March 3, 1853	2nd	[data missing]
Frank E. Carlyle	Democratic	January 3, 1949 – January 3, 1957	7th	[data missing]
Samuel P. Carson	Jacksonian	March 4, 1825 – March 3, 1833	12th	[data missing]
Madison Cawthorn	Republican	January 3, 2021 – January 3, 2023	11th	Lost renomination to C. Edwards
Richard T. Chatham	Democratic	January 3, 1949 – January 3, 1957	5th	[data missing]
Henry P. Cheatham	Republican	March 4, 1889 – March 3, 1893	2nd	[data missing]
Henry S. Clark	Democratic	March 4, 1845 – March 3, 1847	8th	[data missing]
James M. Clarke	Democratic	January 3, 1983 – January 3, 1985	11th	[data missing]
James M. Clarke	Democratic	January 3, 1987 – January 3, 1991	11th	[data missing]
James W. Clark	Democratic-Republican	March 4, 1815 – March 3, 1817	3rd	[data missing]
Jerome B. Clark	Democratic	March 4, 1929 – March 3, 1933	6th	[data missing]
Jerome B. Clark	Democratic	March 4, 1933 – January 3, 1949	7th	[data missing]
Eva M. Clayton	Democratic	November 3, 1992 – January 3, 2003	1st	[data missing]
Thomas L. Clingman	Whig	March 4, 1843 – March 3, 1845	1st	[data missing]
Thomas L. Clingman	Whig	March 4, 1847 – March 3, 1853	1st	Resigned to become U.S. senator
Thomas L. Clingman	Democratic	March 4, 1853 – May 7, 1858	8th	Resigned to become U.S. senator
Clinton L. Cobb	Republican	March 4, 1869 – March 3, 1875	1st	[data missing]
Bill Cobey	Republican	January 3, 1985 – January 3, 1987	4th	[data missing]
Howard Coble	Republican	January 3, 1985 – January 3, 2015	6th	[data missing]
James Cochran	Democratic-Republican	March 4, 1809 – March 3, 1813	9th	[data missing]
Henry W. Connor	Democratic-Republican	March 4, 1821 – March 3, 1825	11th	[data missing]
Henry W. Connor	Jacksonian	March 4, 1825 – March 3, 1837	11th	[data missing]
Henry W. Connor	Democratic	March 4, 1837 – March 3, 1841	11th	[data missing]
Harold D. Cooley	Democratic	July 7, 1934 – December 30, 1966	4th	Resigned
Charles H. Cowles	Republican	March 4, 1909 – March 3, 1911	8th	[data missing]
William H. H. Cowles	Democratic	March 4, 1885 – March 3, 1893	8th	[data missing]
William R. Cox	Democratic	March 4, 1881 – March 3, 1887	4th	[data missing]
Francis B. Craige	Democratic	March 4, 1853 – March 3, 1861	7th	[data missing]
William T. Crawford	Democratic	March 4, 1891 – March 3, 1895	9th	[data missing]
William T. Crawford	Democratic	March 4, 1899 – May 10, 1900	9th	Lost contested election
William T. Crawford	Democratic	March 4, 1907 – March 3, 1909	10th	[data missing]
Josiah Crudup	Democratic-Republican	March 4, 1821 – March 3, 1823	8th	[data missing]
John Culpepper	Federalist	March 4, 1807 – January 2, 1808	7th	Elected in 1806; Seat declared vacant
John Culpepper	Federalist	February 23, 1808 – March 3, 1809	7th	Elected to fill his vacancy Lost re-election
John Culpepper	Federalist	March 4, 1813 – March 3, 1817	7th	Elected in 1813; Lost re-election
John Culpepper	Federalist	March 4, 1819 – March 3, 1821	7th	Elected in 1819; Lost re-election
John Culpepper	Federalist	March 4, 1823 – March 3, 1825	7th	Elected in 1823; Lost re-election
John Culpepper	Anti-Jacksonian	March 4, 1827 – March 3, 1829	7th	Elected in 1827; Lost re-election
John Daniel	Democratic	March 4, 1841 – March 3, 1843	2nd	[data missing]
John Daniel	Democratic	March 4, 1843 – March 3, 1847	7th	[data missing]
John Daniel	Democratic	March 4, 1847 – March 3, 1853	6th	[data missing]
William Davidson	Federalist	December 2, 1818 – March 3, 1821	11th	[data missing]
Don Davis	Democratic	January 3, 2023 – present	1st	Incumbent
Joseph J. Davis	Democratic	March 4, 1875 – March 3, 1881	4th	[data missing]
William J. Dawson	Anti-Administration	March 4, 1793 – March 3, 1795	8th	[data missing]
Charles B. Deane	Democratic	January 3, 1947 – January 3, 1957	8th	[data missing]
Edmund Deberry	Anti-Jacksonian	March 4, 1829 – March 3, 1831	7th	[data missing]
Edmund Deberry	Anti-Jacksonian	March 4, 1833 – March 3, 1837	7th	[data missing]
Edmund Deberry	Whig	March 4, 1837 – March 3, 1843	7th	[data missing]
Edmund Deberry	Whig	March 4, 1843 – March 3, 1845	4th	[data missing]
Edmund Deberry	Whig	March 4, 1849 – March 3, 1851	3rd	[data missing]
John T. Deweese	Republican	July 6, 1868 – February 28, 1870	4th	Resigned
Samuel Dickens	Democratic-Republican	December 2, 1816 – March 3, 1817	8th	[data missing]
Joseph Dickson	Federalist	March 4, 1799 – March 3, 1801	1st	[data missing]
Joseph Dixon	Republican	December 5, 1870 – March 3, 1871	2nd	[data missing]
James Cochrane Dobbin	Democratic	March 4, 1845 – March 3, 1847	5th	[data missing]
Alfred Dockery	Whig	March 4, 1845 – March 3, 1847	4th	[data missing]
Alfred Dockery	Whig	March 4, 1851 – March 3, 1853	3rd	[data missing]
Oliver H. Dockery	Republican	July 13, 1868 – March 3, 1871	3rd	[data missing]
Richard S. Donnell	Whig	March 4, 1847 – March 3, 1849	8th	[data missing]
Robert L. Doughton	Democratic	March 4, 1911 – March 3, 1933	8th	[data missing]
Robert L. Doughton	Democratic	March 4, 1933 – January 3, 1953	9th	[data missing]
Clement Dowd	Democratic	March 4, 1881 – March 3, 1885	6th	[data missing]
Edward B. Dudley	Jacksonian	March 4, 1829 – March 3, 1831	5th	[data missing]
Carl T. Durham	Democratic	January 3, 1939 – January 3, 1961	6th	[data missing]
Chuck Edwards	Republican	January 3, 2023 – present	11th	Incumbent
Weldon N. Edwards	Democratic-Republican	March 4, 1816 – March 3, 1825	6th	[data missing]
Weldon N. Edwards	Jacksonian	March 4, 1825 – March 3, 1827	6th	[data missing]
Renee Ellmers	Republican	January 3, 2011 – January 3, 2017	2nd	[data missing]
Joseph W. Ervin	Democratic	January 3, 1945 – December 25, 1945	10th	Died
Sam Ervin	Democratic	January 22, 1946 – January 3, 1947	10th	[data missing]
Bob Etheridge	Democratic	January 3, 1997 – January 3, 2011	2nd	[data missing]
Hamilton G. Ewart	Republican	March 4, 1889 – March 3, 1891	9th	[data missing]
John M. Faison	Democratic	March 4, 1911 – March 3, 1915	3rd	[data missing]
Charles Fisher	Democratic-Republican	February 11, 1819 – March 3, 1821	10th	[data missing]
Charles Fisher	Democratic	March 4, 1839 – March 3, 1841	10th	[data missing]
Alonzo D. Folger	Democratic	January 3, 1939 – April 30, 1941	5th	Died
John H. Folger	Democratic	June 14, 1941 – January 3, 1949	5th	[data missing]
Daniel M. Forney	Democratic-Republican	March 4, 1815 – 1818	11th	Resigned
Peter Forney	Democratic-Republican	March 4, 1813 – March 3, 1815	11th	[data missing]
Lawrence H. Fountain	Democratic	January 3, 1953 – January 3, 1983	2nd	[data missing]
Valerie Foushee	Democratic	January 3, 2023 – present	4th	Incumbent
John E. Fowler	Populist	March 4, 1897 – March 3, 1899	3rd	[data missing]
Virginia Foxx	Republican	January 3, 2005 – present	5th	Incumbent
Jesse Franklin	Democratic-Republican	March 4, 1795 – March 3, 1797	3rd	[data missing]
Meshack Franklin	Democratic-Republican	March 4, 1807 – March 3, 1813	12th	[data missing]
Meshack Franklin	Democratic-Republican	March 4, 1813 – March 3, 1815	13th	[data missing]
John R. French	Republican	July 6, 1868 – March 3, 1869	1st	[data missing]
David Funderburk	Republican	January 3, 1995 – January 3, 1997	2nd	[data missing]
Nick Galifianakis	Democratic	January 3, 1967 – January 3, 1969	5th	[data missing]
Nick Galifianakis	Democratic	January 3, 1969 – January 3, 1973	4th	[data missing]
James C. Gardner	Republican	January 3, 1967 – January 3, 1969	4th	[data missing]
William Gaston	Federalist	March 4, 1813 – March 3, 1817	4th	[data missing]
Alfred M. Gatlin	Democratic-Republican	March 4, 1823 – March 3, 1825	1st	[data missing]
James Gillespie	Anti-Administration	March 4, 1793 – March 3, 1795	6th	[data missing]
James Gillespie	Democratic-Republican	March 4, 1795 – March 3, 1799	6th	[data missing]
James Gillespie	Democratic-Republican	March 4, 1803 – March 3, 1805	5th	[data missing]
John A. Gilmer	Know Nothing	March 4, 1857 – March 3, 1859	5th	[data missing]
John A. Gilmer	Opposition	March 4, 1859 – March 3, 1861	5th	[data missing]
Hannibal L. Godwin	Democratic	March 4, 1907 – March 3, 1921	6th	[data missing]
Benjamin F. Grady	Democratic	March 4, 1891 – March 3, 1895	3rd	[data missing]
James Graham	Anti-Jacksonian	March 4, 1833 – March 29, 1936	12th	Seat declared vacant
James Graham	Anti-Jacksonian	December 5, 1836 – March 3, 1843	12th	Seat declared vacant
James Graham	Whig	March 4, 1837 – March 3, 1843	12th	[data missing]
James Graham	Whig	March 4, 1845 – March 3, 1847	1st	[data missing]
John G. Grant	Republican	March 4, 1909 – March 3, 1911	10th	[data missing]
Wharton J. Green	Democratic	March 4, 1883 – March 3, 1887	3rd	[data missing]
William B. Grove	Pro-Administration	March 4, 1791 – March 3, 1793	5th	[data missing]
William B. Grove	Pro-Administration	March 4, 1793 – March 3, 1795	7th	[data missing]
William B. Grove	Federalist	March 4, 1795 – March 3, 1803	7th	[data missing]
James M. Gudger Jr.	Democratic	March 4, 1903 – March 3, 1907	10th	[data missing]
James M. Gudger Jr.	Democratic	March 4, 1911 – March 3, 1915	10th	[data missing]
V. Lamar Gudger	Democratic	January 3, 1977 – January 3, 1981	11th	[data missing]
Richard N. Hackett	Democratic	March 4, 1907 – March 3, 1909	8th	[data missing]
David M. Hall	Democratic	January 3, 1959 – January 29, 1960	12th	Died
Thomas H. Hall	Democratic-Republican	March 4, 1817 – March 3, 1825	3rd	[data missing]
Thomas H. Hall	Jacksonian	March 4, 1827 – March 3, 1835	3rd	[data missing]
William C. Hammer	Democratic	March 4, 1921 – September 26, 1930	7th	Died
Franklin W. Hancock Jr.	Democratic	November 4, 1930 – January 3, 1939	5th	[data missing]
James C. Harper	Democratic	March 4, 1871 – March 3, 1873	7th	[data missing]
Pat Harrigan	Republican	January 3, 2025 – present	10th	Incumbent
Mark Harris	Republican	January 3, 2025 – present	8th	Incumbent
Micajah T. Hawkins	Jacksonian	December 15, 1831 – March 3, 1837	6th	[data missing]
Micajah T. Hawkins	Democratic	March 4, 1837 – March 3, 1841	6th	[data missing]
Robin Hayes	Republican	January 3, 1999 – January 3, 2009	8th	[data missing]
David Heaton	Republican	July 25, 1868 – June 25, 1870	2nd	Died
Bill Hefner	Democratic	January 3, 1975 – January 3, 1999	8th	[data missing]
Fred Heineman	Republican	January 3, 1995 – January 3, 1997	4th	[data missing]
Archibald Henderson	Federalist	March 4, 1799 – March 3, 1803	2nd	[data missing]
David N. Henderson	Democratic	January 3, 1961 – January 3, 1977	3rd	[data missing]
John S. Henderson	Democratic	March 4, 1885 – March 3, 1895	7th	[data missing]
Bill Hendon	Republican	January 3, 1981 – January 3, 1983	11th	[data missing]
Bill Hendon	Republican	January 3, 1985 – January 3, 1987	11th	[data missing]
John Hill	Democratic	March 4, 1839 – March 3, 1841	9th	[data missing]
William H. Hill	Federalist	March 4, 1799 – March 3, 1803	6th	[data missing]
Richard Hines	Jacksonian	March 4, 1825 – March 3, 1827	3rd	[data missing]
Clyde R. Hoey	Democratic	December 16, 1919 – March 3, 1921	9th	[data missing]
George Holding	Republican	January 3, 2013 – January 3, 2017	13th	[data missing]
George Holding	Republican	January 3, 2017 – January 3, 2021	2nd	[data missing]
James Holland	Democratic-Republican	March 4, 1795 – March 3, 1797	1st	[data missing]
James Holland	Democratic-Republican	March 4, 1801 – March 3, 1803	1st	[data missing]
James Holland	Democratic-Republican	March 4, 1803 – March 3, 1811	11th	[data missing]
Gabriel Holmes	Jacksonian	March 4, 1825 – September 26, 1829	5th	Died
George E. Hood	Democratic	March 4, 1915 – March 3, 1919	3rd	[data missing]
Charles Hooks	Democratic-Republican	December 2, 1816 – March 3, 1817	5th	[data missing]
Charles Hooks	Democratic-Republican	March 4, 1819 – March 3, 1825	5th	[data missing]
Orlando Hubbs	Republican	March 4, 1881 – March 3, 1883	2nd	[data missing]
Richard Hudson	Republican	January 3, 2013 – January 3, 2023	8th	Redistricted to the 9th district.
Richard Hudson	Republican	January 3, 2023 – present	9th	Redistricted from the 8th district and re-elected in 2022. Incumbent.
John A. Hyman	Republican	March 4, 1875 – March 3, 1877	2nd	[data missing]
Jeff Jackson	Democratic	January 3, 2023 – December 31, 2024	14th	Resigned after being elected North Carolina Attorney General
Hinton James	Democratic	November 4, 1930 – March 3, 1931	7th	[data missing]
Charles Johnson	Democratic-Republican	March 4, 1801 – July 23, 1802	8th	Died
Thomas D. Johnston	Democratic	March 4, 1885 – March 3, 1889	9th	[data missing]
Walter E. Johnston III	Republican	January 3, 1981 – January 3, 1983	6th	[data missing]
Charles A. Jonas	Republican	March 4, 1929 – March 3, 1931	9th	[data missing]
Charles R. Jonas	Republican	January 3, 1953 – January 3, 1963	10th	[data missing]
Charles R. Jonas	Republican	January 3, 1963 – January 3, 1969	8th	[data missing]
Charles R. Jonas	Republican	January 3, 1969 – January 3, 1973	9th	[data missing]
Alexander H. Jones	Republican	July 6, 1868 – March 3, 1871	7th	[data missing]
Hamilton C. Jones	Democratic	January 3, 1947 – January 3, 1953	10th	[data missing]
Walter B. Jones Jr.	Republican	January 3, 1995 – February 10, 2019	3rd	Died
Walter B. Jones Sr	Democratic	February 5, 1966 – September 15, 1992	1st	Died
Woodrow W. Jones	Democratic	November 7, 1950 – January 3, 1957	11th	[data missing]
Thomas Kenan	Democratic-Republican	March 4, 1805 – March 3, 1811	5th	[data missing]
William Kennedy	Democratic-Republican	March 4, 1803 – March 3, 1805	3rd	[data missing]
William Kennedy	Democratic-Republican	March 4, 1809 – March 3, 1811	3rd	[data missing]
William Kennedy	Democratic-Republican	January 30, 1813 – March 3, 1815	3rd	[data missing]
John H. Kerr	Democratic	November 6, 1923 – January 3, 1953	2nd	[data missing]
John Kerr Jr.	Whig	March 4, 1853 – March 3, 1855	5th	[data missing]
William R. King	Democratic-Republican	March 4, 1811 – November 4, 1816	5th	Resigned
Larry Kissell	Democratic	January 3, 2009 – January 3, 2013	8th	[data missing]
Alvin P. Kitchin	Democratic	January 3, 1957 – January 3, 1963	8th	[data missing]
Claude Kitchin	Democratic	March 4, 1901 – May 31, 1923	2nd	Died
William H. Kitchin	Democratic	March 4, 1879 – March 3, 1881	2nd	[data missing]
William W. Kitchin	Democratic	March 4, 1897 – January 11, 1909	5th	Resigned after being elected Governor
Theodore F. Kluttz	Democratic	March 4, 1899 – March 3, 1903	7th	[data missing]
Theodore F. Kluttz	Democratic	March 4, 1903 – March 3, 1905	8th	[data missing]
Brad Knott	Republican	January 3, 2025 – present	13th	Incumbent
Horace R. Kornegay	Democratic	January 3, 1961 – January 3, 1969	6th	[data missing]
John W. Lambeth	Democratic	March 4, 1931 – March 3, 1933	7th	[data missing]
John W. Lambeth	Democratic	March 4, 1933 – January 3, 1939	8th	[data missing]
H. Martin Lancaster	Democratic	January 3, 1987 – January 3, 1995	3rd	[data missing]
Israel G. Lash	Republican	July 20, 1868 – March 3, 1871	5th	[data missing]
Louis C. Latham	Democratic	March 4, 1881 – March 3, 1883	1st	[data missing]
Louis C. Latham	Democratic	March 4, 1887 – March 3, 1889	1st	[data missing]
James M. Leach	Opposition	March 4, 1859 – March 3, 1861	6th	[data missing]
James M. Leach	Democratic	March 4, 1871 – March 3, 1875	5th	[data missing]
Alton A. Lennon	Democratic	January 3, 1957 – January 3, 1973	7th	[data missing]
Romulus Z. Linney	Republican	March 4, 1895 – March 3, 1901	8th	[data missing]
Matthew Locke	Anti-Administration	March 4, 1793 – March 3, 1795	2nd	[data missing]
Matthew Locke	Democratic-Republican	March 4, 1795 – March 3, 1799	2nd	[data missing]
James A. Lockhart	Democratic	March 4, 1895 – June 5, 1896	6th	Lost contested election
John Long	Democratic-Republican	March 4, 1821 – March 3, 1825	10th	[data missing]
John Long	Anti-Jacksonian	March 4, 1825 – March 3, 1829	10th	[data missing]
William C. Love	Democratic-Republican	March 4, 1815 – March 3, 1817	10th	[data missing]
Homer L. Lyon	Democratic	March 4, 1921 – March 3, 1929	6th	[data missing]
Nathaniel Macon	Anti-Administration	March 4, 1791 – March 3, 1793	2nd	Resigned to become U.S. senator
Nathaniel Macon	Anti-Administration	March 4, 1793 – March 3, 1795	5th	Resigned to become U.S. senator
Nathaniel Macon	Democratic-Republican	March 4, 1795 – March 3, 1803	5th	Resigned to become U.S. senator
Nathaniel Macon	Democratic-Republican	March 4, 1803 – December 13, 1815	6th	Resigned to become U.S. senator
Willie P. Mangum	Democratic-Republican	March 4, 1823 – March 3, 1825	8th	Resigned
Willie P. Mangum	Jacksonian	March 4, 1825 – March 18, 1826	8th	Resigned
John Manning Jr.	Democratic	December 7, 1870 – March 3, 1871	4th	[data missing]
Kathy Manning	Democratic	January 3, 2021 – January 3, 2025	6th	Retired.
Charles H. Martin	Populist	June 5, 1896 – March 3, 1899	6th	[data missing]
James G. Martin	Republican	January 3, 1973 – January 3, 1985	9th	[data missing]
Joseph J. Martin	Republican	March 4, 1879 – January 29, 1881	1st	Lost contested election
Archibald McBryde	Federalist	March 4, 1809 – March 3, 1813	7th	[data missing]
Charles W. McClammy	Democratic	March 4, 1887 – March 3, 1891	3rd	[data missing]
Addison McDowell	Republican	January 3, 2025 – present	6th	Incumbent
Joseph "Pleasant Gardens" McDowell	Anti-Administration	March 4, 1793 – March 3, 1795	1st	[data missing]
Joseph McDowell Jr.	Democratic-Republican	March 4, 1797 – March 3, 1799	1st	[data missing]
Duncan McFarlan	Democratic-Republican	March 4, 1805 – March 3, 1807	7th	[data missing]
Patrick McHenry	Republican	January 3, 2005 – January 3, 2025	10th	Retired.
Mike McIntyre	Democratic	January 3, 1997 – January 3, 2015	7th	[data missing]
James I. McKay	Jacksonian	March 4, 1831 – March 3, 1837	5th	[data missing]
James I. McKay	Democratic	March 4, 1837 – March 3, 1843	5th	[data missing]
James I. McKay	Democratic	March 4, 1843 – March 3, 1847	6th	[data missing]
James I. McKay	Democratic	March 4, 1847 – March 3, 1849	7th	[data missing]
Alex McMillan	Republican	January 3, 1985 – January 3, 1995	9th	[data missing]
Archibald McNeill	Federalist	March 4, 1821 – March 3, 1823	7th	[data missing]
Archibald McNeill	Jacksonian	March 4, 1825 – March 3, 1827	7th	[data missing]
Mark Meadows	Republican	January 3, 2013 – March 30, 2020	11th	[data missing]
Alexander Mebane	Anti-Administration	March 4, 1793 – March 3, 1795	4th	[data missing]
Brad Miller	Democratic	January 3, 2003 – January 3, 2013	13th	[data missing]
Anderson Mitchell	Whig	April 27, 1842 – March 3, 1843	13th	[data missing]
Wilmer D. Mizell	Republican	January 3, 1969 – January 3, 1975	5th	[data missing]
William Montgomery	Jacksonian	March 4, 1835 – March 3, 1837	8th	[data missing]
William Montgomery	Democratic	March 4, 1837 – March 3, 1841	8th	[data missing]
James M. Moody	Republican	March 4, 1901 – February 5, 1903	9th	Died
Tim Moore	Republican	January 3, 2025 – present	14th	Incumbent
James T. Morehead	Whig	March 4, 1851 – March 3, 1853	4th	[data missing]
John M. Morehead	Republican	March 4, 1909 – March 3, 1911	5th	[data missing]
Cameron A. Morrison	Democratic	January 3, 1943 – January 3, 1945	10th	[data missing]
George Mumford	Democratic-Republican	March 4, 1815 – December 31, 1818	10th	Died
William H. Murfree	Democratic-Republican	March 4, 1813 – March 3, 1817	1st	[data missing]
Greg Murphy	Republican	September 10, 2019 – present	3rd	Incumbent
Sue Myrick	Republican	January 3, 1995 – January 3, 2013	9th	[data missing]
Stephen L. Neal	Democratic	January 3, 1975 – January 3, 1995	5th	[data missing]
John Nichols	Independent	March 4, 1887 – March 3, 1889	4th	[data missing]
Wiley Nickel	Democratic	January 3, 2023 – January 3, 2025	13th	Retired.
James E. O'Hara	Republican	March 4, 1883 – March 3, 1887	2nd	[data missing]
David Outlaw	Whig	March 4, 1847 – March 3, 1853	9th	[data missing]
George Outlaw	Democratic-Republican	January 18, 1825 – March 3, 1825	2nd	[data missing]
James Owen	Democratic-Republican	March 4, 1817 – March 3, 1819	5th	[data missing]
Robert N. Page	Democratic	March 4, 1903 – March 3, 1917	7th	[data missing]
Robert Treat Paine	Know Nothing	March 4, 1855 – March 3, 1857	1st	[data missing]
Gilbert B. Patterson	Democratic	March 4, 1903 – March 3, 1907	6th	[data missing]
Joseph Pearson	Federalist	March 4, 1809 – March 3, 1815	10th	[data missing]
Richmond Pearson	Republican	March 4, 1895 – March 3, 1899	9th	[data missing]
Richmond Pearson	Republican	May 10, 1900 – March 3, 1901	9th	[data missing]
Ebenezer Pettigrew	Anti-Jacksonian	March 4, 1835 – March 3, 1837	3rd	[data missing]
Israel Pickens	Democratic-Republican	March 4, 1811 – March 3, 1813	11th	[data missing]
Israel Pickens	Democratic-Republican	March 4, 1813 – March 3, 1817	12th	[data missing]
Robert Pittenger	Republican	January 3, 2013 – January 3, 2019	9th	[data missing]
Walter Freshwater Pool	Republican	March 4, 1883 – August 25, 1883	1st	Died
Robert Potter	Jacksonian	March 4, 1829 – November, 1831	6th	Resigned
Edward W. Pou	Democratic	March 4, 1901 – April 1, 1934	4th	Died
Eliza J. Pratt	Democratic	May 25, 1946 – January 3, 1947	8th	[data missing]
Lunsford R. Preyer	Democratic	January 3, 1969 – January 3, 1981	6th	[data missing]
David E. Price	Democratic	January 3, 1987 – January 3, 1995	4th	[data missing]
David E. Price	Democratic	January 3, 1997 – January 3, 2023	4th	Retired.
George M. Pritchard	Republican	March 4, 1929 – March 3, 1931	10th	[data missing]
Samuel D. Purviance	Federalist	March 4, 1803 – March 3, 1805	7th	[data missing]
Richard C. Puryear	Whig	March 4, 1853 – March 3, 1855	6th	[data missing]
Richard C. Puryear	Know Nothing	March 4, 1855 – March 3, 1857	6th	[data missing]
Kenneth Rayner	Whig	March 4, 1839 – March 3, 1843	1st	[data missing]
Kenneth Rayner	Whig	March 4, 1843 – March 3, 1845	9th	[data missing]
Edwin G. Reade	Know Nothing	March 4, 1855 – March 3, 1857	5th	[data missing]
Monroe M. Redden	Democratic	January 3, 1947 – January 3, 1953	12th	[data missing]
David S. Reid	Democratic	March 4, 1843 – March 3, 1847	3rd	[data missing]
James W. Reid	Democratic	January 28, 1885 – December 31, 1886	5th	Resigned
Abraham Rencher	Jacksonian	March 4, 1829 – March 3, 1833	10th	[data missing]
Abraham Rencher	Anti-Jacksonian	March 4, 1833 – March 3, 1837	10th	[data missing]
Abraham Rencher	Whig	March 4, 1837 – March 3, 1839	10th	[data missing]
Abraham Rencher	Whig	March 4, 1841 – March 3, 1843	10th	[data missing]
William M. Robbins	Democratic	March 4, 1873 – March 3, 1879	7th	[data missing]
Leonidas D. Robinson	Democratic	March 4, 1917 – March 3, 1921	7th	[data missing]
Sion H. Rogers	Whig	March 4, 1853 – March 3, 1855	4th	[data missing]
Sion H. Rogers	Democratic	March 4, 1871 – March 3, 1873	4th	[data missing]
Charlie Rose	Democratic	January 3, 1973 – January 3, 1997	7th	[data missing]
Deborah K. Ross	Democratic	January 3, 2021 – present	2nd	Incumbent
David Rouzer	Republican	January 3, 2015 – present	7th	Incumbent
Alfred Rowland	Democratic	March 4, 1887 – March 3, 1891	6th	[data missing]
Thomas H. Ruffin	Democratic	March 4, 1853 – March 3, 1861	2nd	[data missing]
Daniel L. Russell	Republican	March 4, 1879 – March 3, 1881	3rd	[data missing]
Earl B. Ruth	Republican	January 3, 1969 – January 3, 1975	8th	[data missing]
Romulus M. Saunders	Democratic-Republican	March 4, 1821 – March 3, 1825	9th	[data missing]
Romulus M. Saunders	Jacksonian	March 4, 1825 – March 3, 1827	9th	[data missing]
Romulus M. Saunders	Democratic	March 4, 1841 – March 3, 1843	8th	[data missing]
Romulus M. Saunders	Democratic	March 4, 1843 – March 3, 1845	5th	[data missing]
Lemuel Sawyer	Democratic-Republican	March 4, 1807 – March 3, 1813	1st	[data missing]
Lemuel Sawyer	Democratic-Republican	March 4, 1817 – March 3, 1823	1st	[data missing]
Lemuel Sawyer	Jacksonian	March 4, 1825 – March 3, 1829	1st	[data missing]
Samuel T. Sawyer	Whig	March 4, 1837 – March 3, 1839	1st	[data missing]
Alfred M. Scales	Democratic	March 4, 1857 – March 3, 1859	6th	[data missing]
Alfred M. Scales	Democratic	March 4, 1875 – December 30, 1884	5th	Resigned after being elected Governor
Ralph J. Scott	Democratic	January 3, 1957 – January 3, 1967	5th	[data missing]
Thomas Settle	Democratic-Republican	March 4, 1817 – March 3, 1821	9th	[data missing]
Thomas Settle III	Republican	March 4, 1893 – March 3, 1897	5th	[data missing]
John Sevier	Pro-Administration	June 16, 1790 – March 3, 1791	5th	[data missing]
John W. Shackelford	Democratic	March 4, 1881 – January 18, 1883	3rd	Died
Henry M. Shaw	Democratic	March 4, 1853 – March 3, 1855	1st	[data missing]
Henry M. Shaw	Democratic	March 4, 1857 – March 3, 1859	1st	[data missing]
John G. Shaw	Democratic	March 4, 1895 – March 3, 1897	3rd	[data missing]
Charles B. Shepard	Whig	March 4, 1837 – March 3, 1839	4th	[data missing]
Charles B. Shepard	Democratic	March 4, 1839 – March 3, 1841	4th	[data missing]
William B. Shepard	Anti-Jacksonian	March 4, 1829 – March 3, 1837	1st	[data missing]
Augustine H. Shepperd	Jacksonian	March 4, 1827 – March 3, 1833	9th	[data missing]
Augustine H. Shepperd	Anti-Jacksonian	March 4, 1833 – March 3, 1837	9th	[data missing]
Augustine H. Shepperd	Whig	March 4, 1837 – March 3, 1839	9th	[data missing]
Augustine H. Shepperd	Whig	March 4, 1841 – March 3, 1843	9th	[data missing]
Augustine H. Shepperd	Whig	March 4, 1847 – March 3, 1851	4th	[data missing]
Francis E. Shober	Democratic	March 4, 1869 – March 3, 1873	6th	[data missing]
Alonzo C. Shuford	Populist	March 4, 1895 – March 3, 1899	7th	[data missing]
George A. Shuford	Democratic	January 3, 1953 – January 3, 1959	12th	[data missing]
Heath Shuler	Democratic	January 3, 2007 – January 3, 2013	11th	[data missing]
Furnifold M. Simmons	Democratic	March 4, 1887 – March 3, 1889	2nd	[data missing]
Harry Skinner	Populist	March 4, 1895 – March 3, 1899	1st	[data missing]
Thomas G. Skinner	Democratic	November 20, 1883 – March 3, 1887	1st	[data missing]
Thomas G. Skinner	Democratic	March 4, 1889 – March 3, 1891	1st	[data missing]
Jesse Slocumb	Federalist	March 4, 1817 – December 20, 1820	4th	Died
John H. Small	Democratic	March 4, 1899 – March 3, 1921	1st	[data missing]
James S. Smith	Democratic-Republican	March 4, 1817 – March 3, 1821	8th	[data missing]
William A. Smith	Republican	March 4, 1873 – March 3, 1875	4th	[data missing]
William N. H. Smith	Opposition	March 4, 1859 – March 3, 1861	1st	[data missing]
Richard D. Spaight	Democratic-Republican	December 10, 1798 – March 3, 1801	10th	[data missing]
Richard D. Spaight Jr.	Democratic-Republican	March 4, 1823 – March 3, 1825	4th	[data missing]
Jesse Speight	Jacksonian	March 4, 1829 – March 3, 1837	4th	[data missing]
Richard Stanford	Democratic-Republican	March 4, 1797 – 1816	4th	[data missing]
Richard Stanford	Democratic-Republican	March 4, 1803 – April 9, 1816	8th	Died
Edward Stanly	Whig	March 4, 1837 – March 3, 1843	3rd	[data missing]
Edward Stanly	Whig	March 4, 1849 – March 3, 1853	8th	[data missing]
John Stanly	Federalist	March 4, 1801 – March 3, 1803	10th	[data missing]
John Stanly	Federalist	March 4, 1809 – March 3, 1811	4th	[data missing]
Charles M. Stedman	Democratic	March 4, 1911 – September 23, 1930	5th	Died
John Steele	Pro-Administration	April 19, 1790 – March 3, 1791	4th	[data missing]
John Steele	Pro-Administration	March 4, 1791 – March 3, 1793	1st	[data missing]
Walter L. Steele	Democratic	March 4, 1877 – March 3, 1881	6th	[data missing]
James Stewart	Federalist	January 5, 1818 – March 3, 1819	7th	[data missing]
David Stone	Democratic-Republican	March 4, 1799 – March 3, 1801	8th	[data missing]
William F. Strowd	Populist	March 4, 1895 – March 3, 1899	4th	[data missing]
William F. Strudwick	Federalist	November 28, 1796 – March 3, 1797	4th	[data missing]
Absalom Tatom	Democratic-Republican	March 4, 1795 – June 1, 1796	4th	Resigned
Charles H. Taylor	Republican	January 3, 1991 – January 3, 2007	11th	[data missing]
Roy A. Taylor	Democratic	June 25, 1960 – January 3, 1963	12th	[data missing]
Roy A. Taylor	Democratic	January 3, 1963 – January 3, 1977	11th	[data missing]
Charles R. Thomas	Republican	March 4, 1871 – March 3, 1875	2nd	[data missing]
Charles R. Thomas	Democratic	March 4, 1899 – March 3, 1911	3rd	[data missing]
Daniel Turner	Jacksonian	March 4, 1827 – March 3, 1829	6th	[data missing]
William B. Umstead	Democratic	March 4, 1933 – January 3, 1939	6th	[data missing]
Tim Valentine	Democratic	January 3, 1983 – January 3, 1995	2nd	[data missing]
Robert Brank Vance	Democratic-Republican	March 4, 1823 – March 3, 1825	12th	[data missing]
Robert B. Vance	Democratic	March 4, 1873 – March 3, 1885	8th	[data missing]
Zebulon B. Vance	Democratic	December 7, 1858 – March 3, 1861	8th	[data missing]
Abraham W. Venable	Democratic	March 4, 1847 – March 3, 1853	5th	[data missing]
Alfred M. Waddell	Democratic	March 4, 1871 – March 3, 1879	3rd	[data missing]
Felix Walker	Democratic-Republican	March 4, 1817 – March 3, 1823	12th	[data missing]
Mark Walker	Republican	January 3, 2015 – January 3, 2021	6th	[data missing]
Hallett S. Ward	Democratic	March 4, 1921 – March 3, 1925	1st	[data missing]
Lindsay C. Warren	Democratic	March 4, 1925 – October 31, 1940	1st	Resigned after being appointed Comptroller General of the United States
William H. Washington	Whig	March 4, 1841 – March 3, 1843	4th	[data missing]
Mel Watt	Democratic	January 3, 1993 – January 6, 2014	12th	Resigned after being appointed Director of the Federal Housing Finance Agency
Zebulon Weaver	Democratic	March 4, 1917 – March 1, 1919	10th	Lost contested election
Zebulon Weaver	Democratic	March 4, 1919 – March 3, 1929	10th	[data missing]
Zebulon Weaver	Democratic	March 4, 1931 – March 3, 1933	10th	[data missing]
Zebulon Weaver	Democratic	March 4, 1933 – January 3, 1943	11th	[data missing]
Zebulon Weaver	Democratic	January 3, 1943 – January 3, 1947	12th	[data missing]
Edwin Y. Webb	Democratic	March 4, 1903 – November 10, 1919	9th	Died
George H. White	Republican	March 4, 1897 – March 3, 1901	2nd	[data missing]
Basil L. Whitener	Democratic	January 3, 1957 – January 3, 1963	11th	[data missing]
Basil L. Whitener	Democratic	January 3, 1963 – January 3, 1969	10th	[data missing]
Charles O. Whitley	Democratic	January 3, 1977 – December 31, 1986	3rd	[data missing]
Archibald H. A. Williams	Democratic	March 4, 1891 – March 3, 1893	5th	[data missing]
Benjamin Williams	Anti-Administration	March 4, 1793 – March 3, 1795	10th	[data missing]
Lewis Williams	Democratic-Republican	March 4, 1815 – March 3, 1825	13th	Died
Lewis Williams	Anti-Jacksonian	March 4, 1825 – March 3, 1829	13th	Died
Lewis Williams	Anti-Jacksonian	March 4, 1829 – March 3, 1837	13th	Died
Lewis Williams	Whig	March 4, 1837 – February 23, 1842	13th	Died
Marmaduke Williams	Democratic-Republican	March 4, 1803 – March 3, 1809	9th	[data missing]
Robert Williams	Democratic-Republican	March 4, 1797 – March 3, 1803	3rd	[data missing]
Hugh Williamson	Pro-Administration	March 19, 1790 – March 3, 1791	2nd	[data missing]
Hugh Williamson	Pro-Administration	March 4, 1791 – March 3, 1793	4th	[data missing]
Warren Winslow	Democratic	March 4, 1855 – March 3, 1861	3rd	[data missing]
Joseph Winston	Anti-Administration	March 4, 1793 – March 3, 1795	3rd	[data missing]
Joseph Winston	Democratic-Republican	March 4, 1803 – March 3, 1807	12th	[data missing]
Frederick A. Woodard	Democratic	March 4, 1893 – March 3, 1897	2nd	[data missing]
Thomas Wynns	Democratic-Republican	December 7, 1802 – March 3, 1803	8th	[data missing]
Thomas Wynns	Democratic-Republican	March 4, 1803 – March 3, 1807	1st	[data missing]
Bartlett Yancey	Democratic-Republican	March 4, 1813 – March 3, 1817	9th	[data missing]
Jesse J. Yeates	Democratic	March 4, 1875 – March 3, 1879	1st	[data missing]
Jesse J. Yeates	Democratic	January 29, 1881 – March 3, 1881	1st	Won contested election
Tyre York	Independent Democratic	March 4, 1883 – March 3, 1885	7th	[data missing]

== See also ==
- List of United States senators from North Carolina
- North Carolina's congressional delegations
- North Carolina's congressional districts
