= Benjamin F. Grady =

American politician (1831–1914)

- Brady c. 1891–1894

Member of the U.S. House of Representatives from North Carolina's 3rd district
- In office March 4, 1891 – March 3, 1895
- Preceded by: Charles W. McClammy
- Succeeded by: John G. Shaw

Personal details
- Born: October 10, 1831 Sarecta, North Carolina
- Died: March 6, 1914 (aged 82) Clinton, North Carolina
- Party: Democratic

Benjamin Franklin Grady (October 10, 1831 – March 6, 1914) was a teacher, US Congressman and author from North Carolina. He represented the state's 3rd district in the U.S. Congress from 1891 to 1895.

== Biography ==
He was born near Sarecta, in Albertson Township, Duplin County, North Carolina, October 10, 1831. He married Olivia Penelope Hamilton on May 30, 1861 in Huntsville, Texas.

He was teaching mathematics and natural sciences at Austin College in Texas when the Civil War began. He left to join the Confederate Army, serving in Company K, 25th Regiment of the Texas Cavalry. He married Mary Charlotte Bizzell on November 10, 1870 in Clinton, North Carolina. In 1890 he defeated African-American Republican John S. Leary in a race for a seat in the US House of Representatives. He was re-elected for a second term, both times serving North Carolina 3rd District. He was Superintendent of Schools, Duplin Co., N.C. In 1899, he published the book The Case of the South Against the North, which uses historical evidence to justify the South's war against the North on the basis of constitutional principles. He died in Clinton, Sampson County, N.C., March 6, 1914.

U.S. House of Representatives
Preceded by Charles W. McClammy	Member of the U.S. House of Representatives from North Carolina's 3rd congressional district 1891-1895	Succeeded by John G. Shaw
