= Charles W. McClammy =

American politician

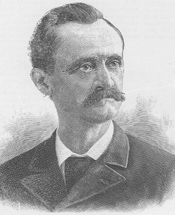

Member of the U.S. House of Representatives from North Carolina's 3rd district
- In office March 4, 1887 – March 3, 1891
- Preceded by: Wharton J. Green
- Succeeded by: Benjamin F. Grady

Personal details
- Born: May 29, 1839 Scotts Hill, North Carolina
- Died: February 26, 1896 (aged 56) Scotts Hill, North Carolina
- Party: Democratic

Charles Washington McClammy (May 29, 1839 – February 26, 1896) was an American educator and Confederate Civil War veteran who served two terms as a Democratic representative elected from North Carolina’s 3rd congressional district from 1887 to 1891.

== Biography ==
He was born at Scotts Hill, North Carolina. He pursued an academic course and was graduated from the University of North Carolina at Chapel Hill in 1859.

=== Civil War ===
Following his school career, McClammy began teaching from 1859 to 1861. He enlisted in the Confederate Army in 1861, and by successive promotions became major in the Third North Carolina Cavalry Regiment and served throughout the American Civil War.

=== Farmer ===
McClammy also engaged in agricultural pursuits at Scotts Hill.

=== Politics ===
He was a member of the State house of representatives in 1866, served in the State senate in 1871.

He was elected as a Democrat to the Fiftieth and Fifty-first Congresses (March 4, 1887 – March 3, 1891).

== Later career and death ==
He resumed agricultural pursuits while he was an unsuccessful candidate for reelection in 1890 to the Fifty-second Congress.

=== Death and burial ===
McClammy died in a boiler explosion on his plantation at Scott's Hill on February 26, 1896, and his remains buried at the family cemetery.

U.S. House of Representatives
Preceded by Wharton J. Green	Member of the U.S. House of Representatives from North Carolina's 3rd congressional district 1887–1891	Succeeded by Benjamin F. Grady
