= John Edgar Fowler =

American politician and lawyer (1866–1930)

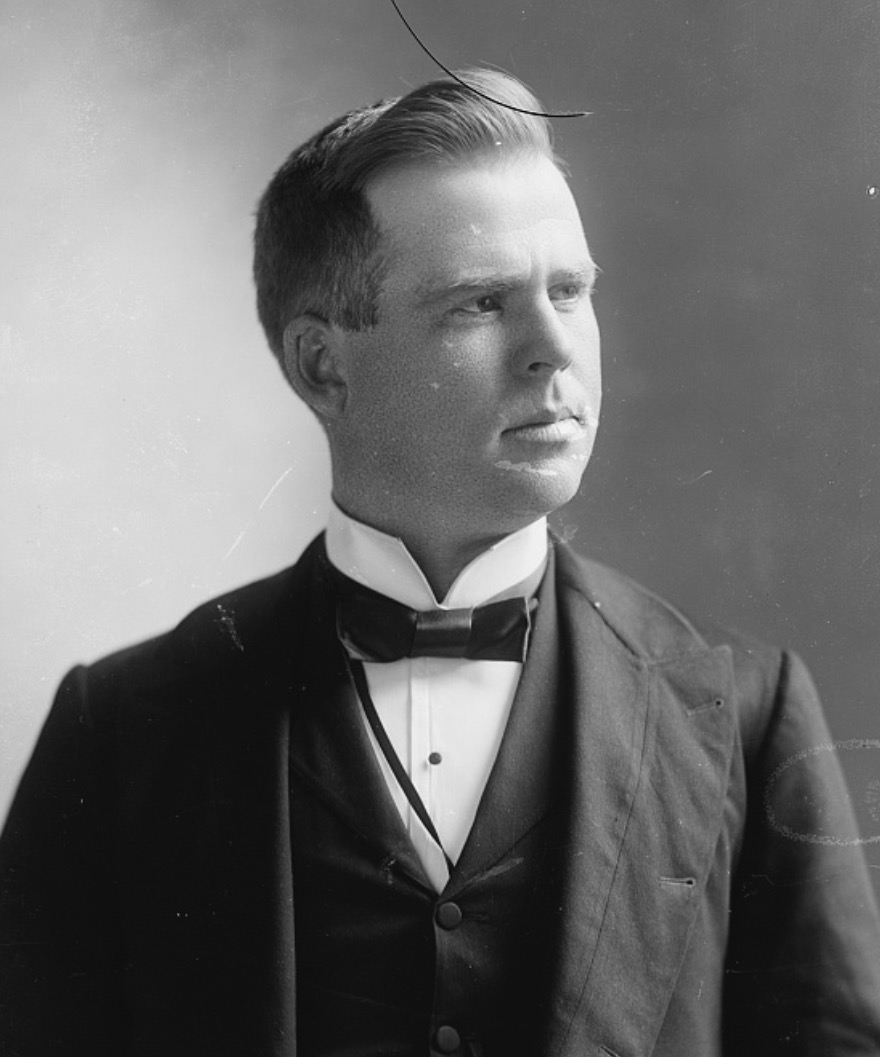
- Fowler c. 1894–1901

Member of the U.S. House of Representatives from North Carolina's 3rd district
- In office March 4, 1897 – March 3, 1899
- Preceded by: John G. Shaw
- Succeeded by: Charles R. Thomas

Member of the North Carolina Senate
- In office 1895–1896

Member of the North Carolina House of Representatives
- In office 1905–1906

Personal details
- Born: September 8, 1866 Honeycutt Township, Sampson County, North Carolina, US
- Died: July 4, 1930 (aged 63) Clinton, North Carolina, US
- Party: Populist Party
- Other political affiliations: Democratic; Republican
- Occupation: Politician, lawyer

John Edgar Fowler (September 8, 1866 – July 4, 1930) was an American politician and lawyer. A member of the Populist Party, he was a member of the United States House of Representatives from North Carolina.

== Early life and education ==
Fowler was born on September 8, 1866, on a farm in Honeycutt Township, Sampson County, North Carolina, the son of Miles Beatty Fowler and Mary Victoria (née Herring) Fowler. Educated at common schools, he attended high school in Salemburg. For two years, he attended Wake Forest University, afterwards working as an educator for a year or two near Salemburg.

Fowler originally studied literature. He then studied law at the University of North Carolina at Chapel Hill from 1892 to 1894. In 1894, he was admitted to the bar, after which he began practicing law in Clinton. From 1895 to 1903, he was a trustee of the University of North Carolina at Greensboro.

== Career ==
Fowler was originally a free silver Democrat, joining the Populist Party in 1892 or 1894. The same year he joined the Populist Party, he ran for the North Carolina House of Representatives, losing by seven votes.

In 1895 and 1896, Fowler was a member of the North Carolina Senate. In the Senate, he was a member of the Committees on the Banking and Finance, on the Judiciary, on Privileges and Elections, and on Psychiatric Hospitals. On February 5, 1895, a bill he introduced setting a statewide interest rate passed.

Fowler was a member of the United States House of Representatives from March 4, 1897, to March 3, 1899, representing North Carolina's 3rd district. He supported the Spanish–American War. After the Populist Party dissolved, he became a Republican. In 1905 and 1906, he was a Republican member of the North Carolina House of Representatives. He was a Presidential elector in the 1916 election. Politically, he was liberal.

After serving in Congress, Fowler returned to practicing law in Clinton. He also farmed.

== Personal life and death ==
Fowler never married. He was Baptist and a Freemason. He died on July 4, 1930, aged 63, in Clinton, and was buried at Clinton Cemetery.

U.S. House of Representatives
Preceded by John G. Shaw	Member of the U.S. House of Representatives from North Carolina's 3rd congressional district 1897-1899	Succeeded by Charles R. Thomas
