= Clement Dowd =

American politician

Clement Dowd (August 27, 1832 – April 15, 1898) was a Democratic politician in North Carolina who served as Mayor of Charlotte, North Carolina from 1869 to 1871 and as a U.S. Representative from 1881 to 1885.

Dowd was born at Richland Creek, in Moore County, NC, and graduated from the University of North Carolina at Chapel Hill in 1856. He served in the Confederate States Army during the Civil War as a First Lieutenant & later Captain in Company H of the 26th North Carolina Infantry Regiment. An attorney, bank president and one-time newspaper editor, Dowd was a law partner of North Carolina Governor Zebulon Vance.

After serving as a city alderman, Dowd was the first mayor of Charlotte elected after the Civil War (his predecessor had been appointed by the state governor). While Dowd was mayor of Charlotte, the city police department was established and a new city charter was adopted.

He served two terms in Congress but chose not to run for re-election in 1884. Dowd worked as the federal tax collector for North Carolina in 1886-1887. He then returned to the practice of law and died in Charlotte, North Carolina on April 15, 1898.

U.S. House of Representatives
Preceded by Walter L. Steele	Member of the U.S. House of Representatives from North Carolina's 6th congressional district 1881–1885	Succeeded by Risden T. Bennett
