= Henry Selby Clark =

American politician

Henry Selby Clark (September 9, 1809 – January 8, 1869) was a Congressional Representative from North Carolina; born near Leechville, North Carolina, September 9, 1809. He attended the common schools. He graduated from the University of North Carolina at Chapel Hill in 1828; studied law; was admitted to the bar and commenced practice in Washington, North Carolina; member of the State house of commons 1834–1836; solicitor for the district in 1842; elected as a Democrat to the Twenty-ninth Congress (March 4, 1845 – March 3, 1847); moved to Greenville, North Carolina, and resumed the practice of law; died in Greenville, N.C., January 8, 1869; interment at his country home near Leechville.

== See also ==
- Twenty-ninth United States Congress

U.S. House of Representatives
| Preceded by Archibald H. Arrington | Member of the U.S. House of Representatives from North Carolina's 8th congressional district 1845–1847 | Succeeded by Richard S. Donnell |
