= William Montgomery (North Carolina politician) =

American politician

William Montgomery (December 29, 1789 – November 27, 1844) was an American medical doctor and politician from Orange County, North Carolina. He served in the North Carolina State Senate from 1824 to 1827, and from 1829 to 1834, and represented North Carolina in the United States House of Representatives from 1835 until 1841.

U.S. House of Representatives
Preceded by Daniel L. Barringer	Member of the U.S. House of Representatives from North Carolina's 8th congressional district 1835–1841	Succeeded by Romulus M. Saunders
