= Daniel Laurens Barringer =

American politician (1788–1852)

24th Speaker of the Tennessee House of Representatives
- In office 1843–1845
- Preceded by: Franklin Buchanan
- Succeeded by: Brookins Campbell

Member of the Tennessee House of Representatives
- In office 1843–1845

Member of the U.S. House of Representatives from North Carolina's 8th district
- In office December 4, 1826 – March 3, 1835
- Preceded by: Willie P. Mangum
- Succeeded by: William Montgomery

Member of the North Carolina House of Representatives
- In office 1819–1822
- In office 1813–1814

Personal details
- Born: October 1, 1788 Cabarrus County, North Carolina, U.S.
- Died: October 16, 1852 (aged 64) Shelbyville, Tennessee, U.S.
- Party: Anti-Jacksonian (since 1833)
- Other political affiliations: Jacksonian (until 1833)
- Relatives: Daniel Moreau Barringer (nephew)

Daniel Laurens Barringer (October 1, 1788 – October 16, 1852) was a slave owner and United States Representative from North Carolina between 1826 and 1834.

Born in Cabarrus County, North Carolina, Barringer studied law and practiced in the state capital of Raleigh. He was elected to the North Carolina House of Commons in 1813 and 1814, then again in 1819–1822.

In 1826, he was chosen in a special election to fill the U.S. House seat left vacant by the resignation of Willie P. Mangum. He was elected in regular Congressional elections to four succeeding congresses, serving in the national legislature from December 4, 1826, to March 3, 1835. He ran unsuccessfully for a fourth term in 1834, after which he settled in Shelbyville, Tennessee. After leaving Congress, Barringer became a member of the Tennessee House of Representatives, where he was Speaker from 1843 to 1845; he was a presidential elector for Whig ticket of Henry Clay and Theodore Frelinghuysen. Barringer died in 1852 in Shelbyville, Tennessee.

Barringer was the uncle of Daniel Moreau Barringer, also later a Congressman from North Carolina.

U.S. House of Representatives
Preceded by Willie P. Mangum	Member of the U.S. House of Representatives from North Carolina's 8th congressional district 1826–1835	Succeeded by William Montgomery
