= Ebenezer Pettigrew =

American politician

Ebenezer Pettigrew (March 10, 1783 – July 8, 1848) was a U.S. representative from North Carolina. He was born near Plymouth, North Carolina, March 10, 1783. He studied under tutors at home and later attended the University of North Carolina at Chapel Hill where he was a charter member of the Debating Society, which became the Dialectic and Philanthropic Societies. He was a plantation owner. He later became a member of the State senate in 1809 and 1810. He was elected as an Anti-Jacksonian to the Twenty-fourth Congress (March 4, 1835 – March 3, 1837), afterwards resuming his agricultural pursuits. He was also a slave owner. He died at Magnolia Plantation on Lake Scuppernong, July 8, 1848, and was interred in the family cemetery.

He was the father of Confederate General J. Johnston Pettigrew.

== Bibliography ==
- Twenty-fourth United States Congress
- Wall, Bennett H. “Ebenezer Pettigrew’s Efforts to Control the Marketing of his Crops.” Agricultural History 27 (October 1953): 123–32.
- U.S. Congress Biographical Directory
- Pettigrew Family Papers (#592), in the Southern Historical Collection, University of North Carolina at Chapel Hill.

U.S. House of Representatives
Preceded by Thomas H. Hall	Member of the U.S. House of Representatives from North Carolina's 3rd congressional district 1835–1837	Succeeded by Edward Stanly
