= Wharton J. Green =

American politician (1831–1910)

Wharton Jackson Green
- Green c. 1894–1901

Member of the U.S. House of Representatives from North Carolina's 3rd district
- In office March 4, 1883 – March 3, 1887
- Preceded by: John W. Shackelford
- Succeeded by: Charles W. McClammy

Personal details
- Born: February 28, 1831 St. Marks, Florida, US
- Died: August 6, 1910 (aged 79)
- Resting place: Cross Creek Cemetery 2, Fayetteville, North Carolina
- Party: Democratic
- Spouse(s): Esther Sargent Ellery, Adeline Burr
- Profession: Lawyer, Politician

Military service
- Allegiance: Confederate States of America
- Branch/service: Confederate States Army
- Years of service: 1861–1865
- Rank: Lieutenant Colonel
- Unit: 2nd Battalion North Carolina Infantry
- Battles/wars: American Civil War

Wharton Jackson Green (February 28, 1831 – August 6, 1910) was a U.S. Congressman from North Carolina and an officer in the Confederate States Army during the American Civil War.

== Biography ==
Born in St. Marks, Florida, Green was instructed by private tutors. He attended Georgetown College, Lovejoy's Academy in Raleigh, North Carolina, and the United States Military Academy, West Point, New York but dropped out. He then studied law at the University of Virginia at Charlottesville and at Cumberland University, Lebanon, Tennessee. He was admitted to the bar in 1854 and commenced practice in Washington, D.C. before engaging in agricultural pursuits at his Warren County, North Carolina plantation, Esmeralda, in 1859.

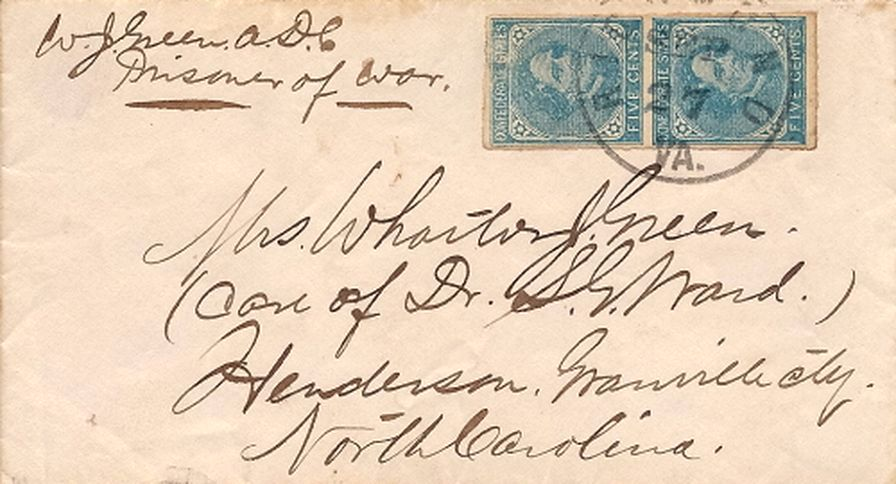
Letter to Mrs Wharton J Green postmarked Richmond, Virginia, September 27, 1864

During the Civil War, Green enlisted in the Confederate service in 1861 and rose through the ranks to lieutenant colonel of the Second North Carolina Battalion. Afterward, he served on Brigadier General Junius Daniel's staff. Green was wounded and taken prisoner at the Battle of Gettysburg in July 1863. He spent the rest of the war in the Johnson's Island prisoner-of-war camp.

After the war, he settled at "Tokay Vineyard," near Fayetteville, North Carolina, and became interested in viticulture. He was a delegate to the Democratic National Conventions in 1868, 1872, 1876, and 1888. Green was the first president of the Society of Confederate Soldiers and Sailors in North Carolina.

Entering politics, he was elected as a Democrat to the Forty-eighth and Forty-ninth Congresses (March 4, 1883 – March 3, 1887). He was an unsuccessful candidate for renomination in 1886 and retired from public service. He then devoted his time to the cultivation of his vineyard and to literary pursuits. He wrote his autobiography, Recollections and Reflections: An auto of Half a Century and More, in 1906.

Wharton Green died at "Tokay," near Fayetteville on August 6, 1910. He was buried in the town's Cross Creek Cemetery.

He was the son of Texas Revolution general Thomas Jefferson Green, the grandson of U.S. Senator Jesse Wharton, and the cousin of Confederate general Matt Whitaker Ransom.

One of Green's daughters, Sarah, married wealthy industrialist Pembroke Jones of Wilmington, NC, in 1884. With the help of their close friend, art collector and railroad president Henry Walters, they created a lifestyle some claim made them models for the saying, "Keeping up with the Joneses." They maintained luxurious residences in Newport and New York City. The garden estate Sarah Green Jones created in Wilmington still exists and is known as Airlie Gardens.

U.S. House of Representatives
Preceded by John W. Shackelford	Member of the U.S. House of Representatives from North Carolina's 3rd congressional district 1883-1887	Succeeded by Charles W. McClammy
