= Sarecta, North Carolina =

- Formerly incorporated community
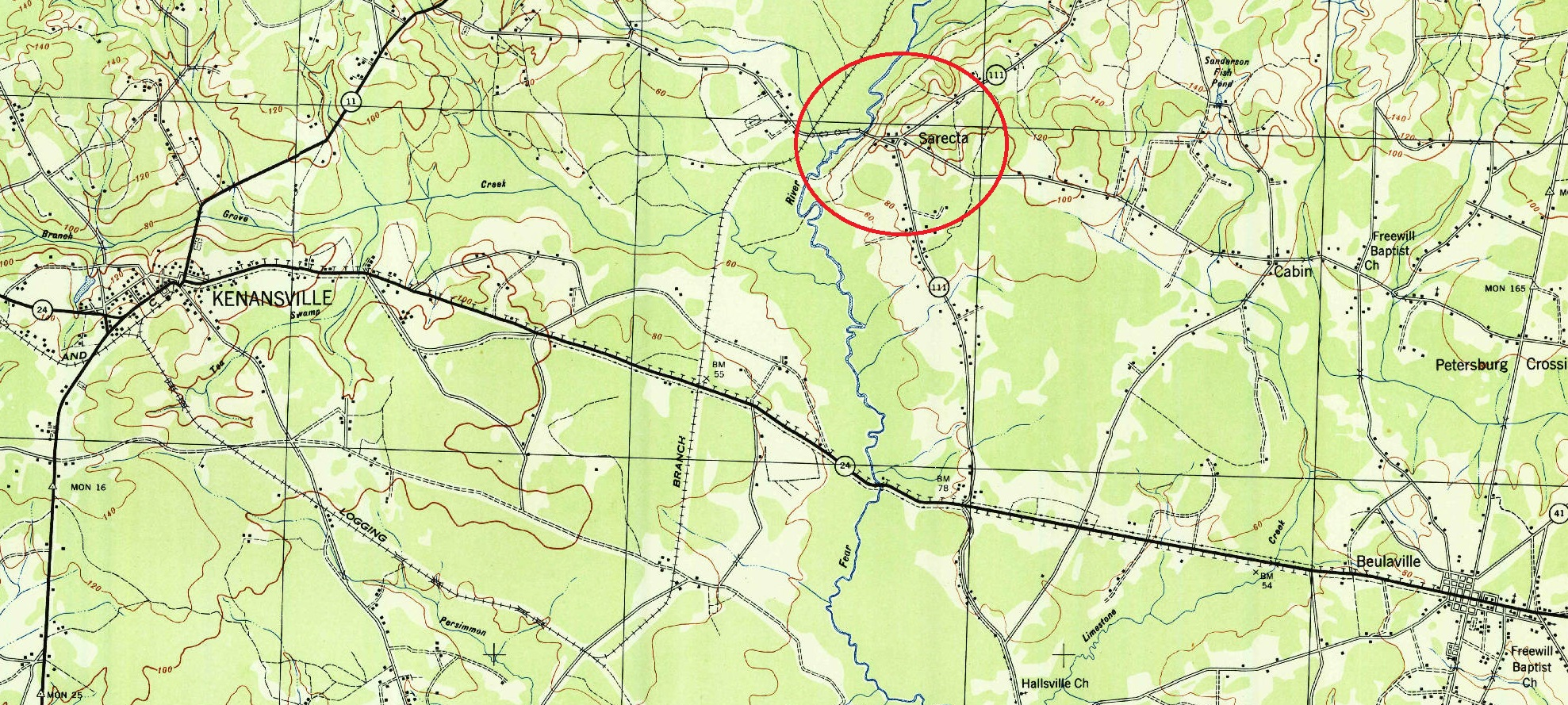
- Location of Sarecta circled on 1943 map

- Location within the state of North Carolina
- Country: United States
- State: North Carolina
- County: Duplin
- Established: 1736 (incorporated 1787)
- Named for: Soracte
- Time zone: UTC-5 (Eastern (EST))
  - Summer (DST): UTC-4 (EDT)
- Area codes: 910, 472

Sarecta was the first incorporated town in Duplin County, North Carolina, established in 1787. In 1736, Duplin County (then upper New Hanover County) was the destination of several hundred Ulster Scots (Scotch-Irish) and a handful of Swiss Protestants. They settled on a plot of land, 71,160 acres between the Northeast Cape Fear River and Black River, obtained from the Crown by Henry McCulloch of London. Sarecta, originally known as Soracte, was the first settlement in the region on the Northeast Cape Fear. It was originally named after Soracte, the mountain near Rome that once housed a temple dedicated to Apollo.

When Sampson County was created out of a portion of Duplin County in 1784, there was a need to establish a new court house in a more central location. Sarecta and the present location of Kenansville were the two candidates, and General James Kenan (for whom Kenansville is named) cast the deciding vote against Sarecta.

By act of the North Carolina General Assembly on January 6, 1787, the town was established under the spelling "Sarecto" and was 100 acres in size including lots and property for a town commons. In the early 19th century, gazetteers would typically describe "Sarecto" as the "chief town" in Duplin County. The town exported raw materials to Wilmington.

Sarecta had a town charter until 1984, the year North Carolina did a sweep to revoke charters of towns which no longer had a functioning government.
