= Walter Leak Steele =

American politician

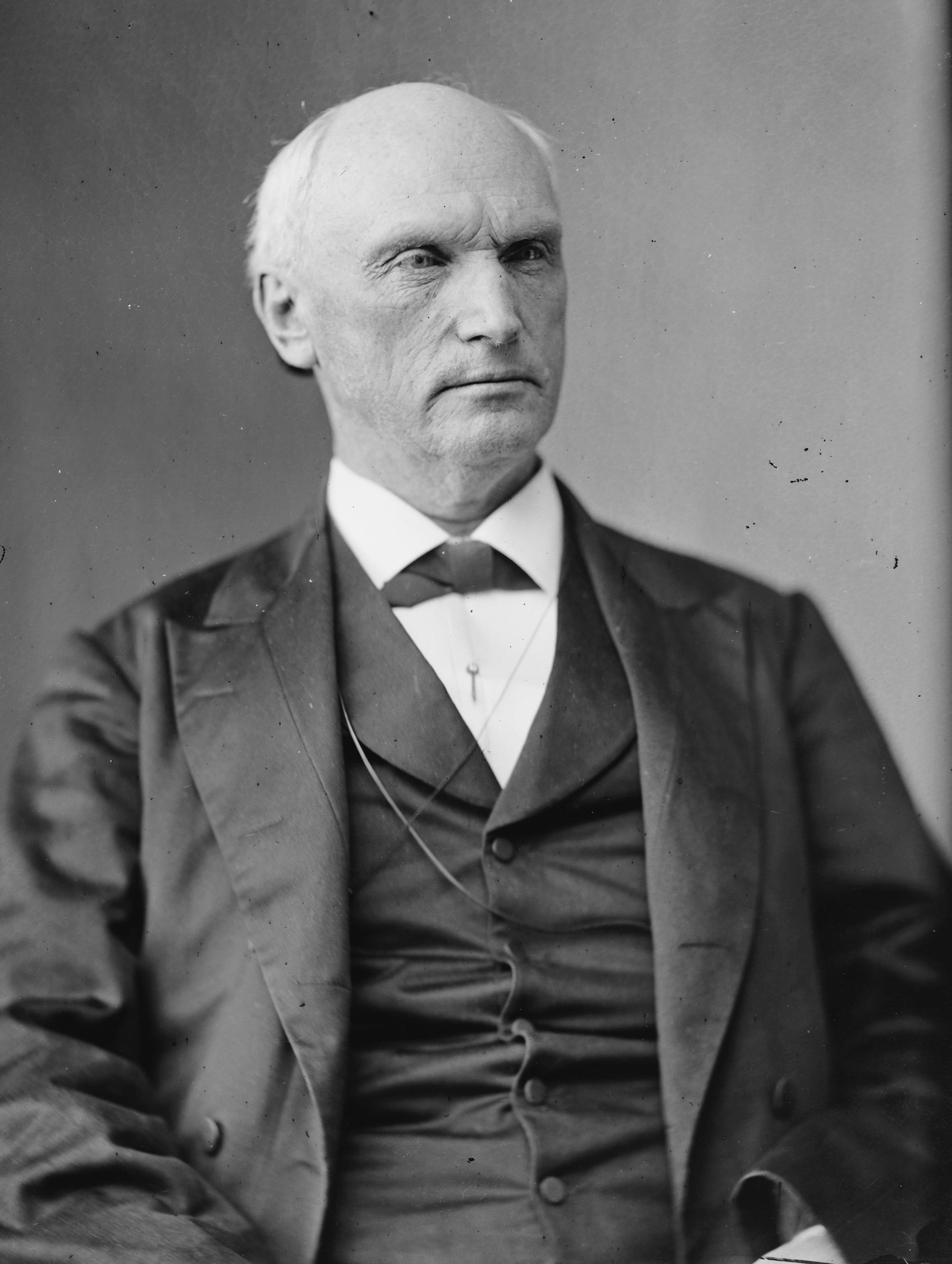
Walter Leak Steele

Walter Leak Steele (April 18, 1823 – October 16, 1891) was a U.S. Congressman from North Carolina between 1877 and 1881.

Born near Rockingham in Richmond County, North Carolina, Steele attended common schools near his home and then Randolph-Macon College in Ashland, Virginia, Wake Forest College, and finally the University of North Carolina at Chapel Hill, graduating in 1844.

Steele was elected to two-year terms in the North Carolina House of Commons in 1846, 1848, 1850, and 1854; he rose to the North Carolina Senate, serving there between 1852 and 1858, and in 1852, he was named as a trustee of the University of North Carolina at Chapel Hill, a post he held until his death.

A delegate to the 1860 Democratic National Conventions in Charleston and Baltimore, Steele chaired the 1861 state convention which passed the ordinance of secession at the beginning of the American Civil War. Steele studied law and was admitted to the bar in 1865 and practiced law in his hometown of Rockingham.

Steele was elected to the 45th and 46th U.S. Congress, serving from March 4, 1877, to March 4, 1881. He declined to run again in 1880 and returned to cotton manufacturing and banking.

Walter L. Steele died in Baltimore, Maryland in 1891 and is buried in Leak Cemetery near Rockingham, North Carolina.

U.S. House of Representatives
Preceded by Thomas S. Ashe	Member of the U.S. House of Representatives from North Carolina's 6th congressional district 1877–1881	Succeeded by Clement Dowd
