= John G. Shaw =

American politician and lawyer (1859–1932)

- Shaw c. 1894–1891

Member of the U.S. House of Representatives from North Carolina's 3rd district
- In office March 4, 1895 – March 3, 1897
- Preceded by: Benjamin F. Grady
- Succeeded by: John Edgar Fowler

Member of the North Carolina House of Representatives
- In office 1888–1890

Personal details
- Born: John Gilbert Shaw; January 16, 1859 Fayetteville, North Carolina, US
- Died: July 21, 1932 (aged 73) Fayetteville, North Carolina, US
- Resting place: Cross Creek Cemetery
- Party: Democratic
- Occupation: Politician, lawyer

John Gilbert Shaw (January 16, 1859 – July 21, 1932) was an American politician and lawyer. A Democrat, he was a member of the United States House of Representatives from North Carolina. He was also a member of the North Carolina House of Representatives.

== Early life and early career ==
Shaw was born on January 16, 1859, near Fayetteville, North Carolina, the son of farmer Duncan Shaw and Catherine (née Gillis) Shaw. He was of Scottish descent. He grew up wealthy, his father owning thousands of acres of farmland in Cumberland County.

Educated at common schools, Shaw worked in the naval stores industry and owned a turpentine business. He read law at home, and in 1888, was admitted to the bar, after which he began practicing in Fayetteville. He also operated the Cumberland County farm.

== Career ==
Shaw was a Democrat. From 1888 to 1890, he was a member of the North Carolina House of Representatives. While serving, he was a member of the Committee on Penal Institutions. He was one of the House's youngest members at the time. He was a Presidential elector in the 1892 election, as which he voted Grover Cleveland. From 1890 to 1894, he was prosecutor of Cumberland County. Shaw was a member of the United States House of Representatives, from March 4, 1895, to March 3, 1897, representing North Carolina's 3rd district. He lost the nomination for the following election. He unsuccessfully ran for North Carolina's 6th district in 1920.

After serving in Congress, Shaw returned to practicing law in Fayetteville, with him working as a defense attorney. In all the cases he argued, capital punishment was never used. In 1918, he helped choose the site for Fort Bragg, by giving William J. Snow a tour of a potential site in Fayetteville, which was eventually chosen. Interested in local history, he wrote a chapter in a book about Fayetteville, by John Alexander Oates.

== Personal life and death ==
In 1893, Shaw married Elizabeth Avery McPherson, with whom he had four children. He was Presbyterian. He died on July 21, 1932, aged 73, in Fayetteville, from a combination of illnesses. His funeral was held on July 22, being attended by hundreds, with his burial taking place at Cross Creek Cemetery. An archive of his papers is located at the State Archives of North Carolina.

U.S. House of Representatives
Preceded by Benjamin F. Grady	Member of the U.S. House of Representatives from North Carolina's 3rd congressional district 1895–1897	Succeeded by John Edgar Fowler
