= Richard C. Puryear =

American politician

Richard Clauselle Puryear (February 9, 1801 – July 30, 1867) was a U.S. Congressman from North Carolina between the years of 1853 and 1857. A planter and politician, he also served in the North Carolina House for several terms and the state senate.

== Early life ==
Richard Clauselle Puryear was born in Mecklenburg County, Virginia. When he was a child, his family moved to Surry County, North Carolina, where he grew up.

He became a planter near Huntsville. He served as a militia colonel and the magistrate of Surry County before being elected to the North Carolina House of Commons.

Puryear served terms in the North Carolina House in 1838, 1844, 1846, and 1852, as well as a term in the North Carolina Senate before being elected as a Whig to the U.S. House in 1852. He was re-elected in 1854 as a candidate of the American Party and ran unsuccessfully for a third term in 1856.

Puryear was a delegate to the Provisional Confederate Congress in 1861 and to the Peace Congress following the American Civil War. He returned to farming and died at his plantation, "Shallow Ford," in Yadkin County in 1867.

U.S. House of Representatives
Preceded by John Daniel	Member of the U.S. House of Representatives from North Carolina's 6th congressional district 1853–1857	Succeeded by Alfred M. Scales
Confederate States House of Representatives
Preceded by none	Representative to the Provisional Confederate Congress from North Carolina; 1861	Succeeded by none
