= Cadwallader Jones Jr. =

American politician (1813–1899)

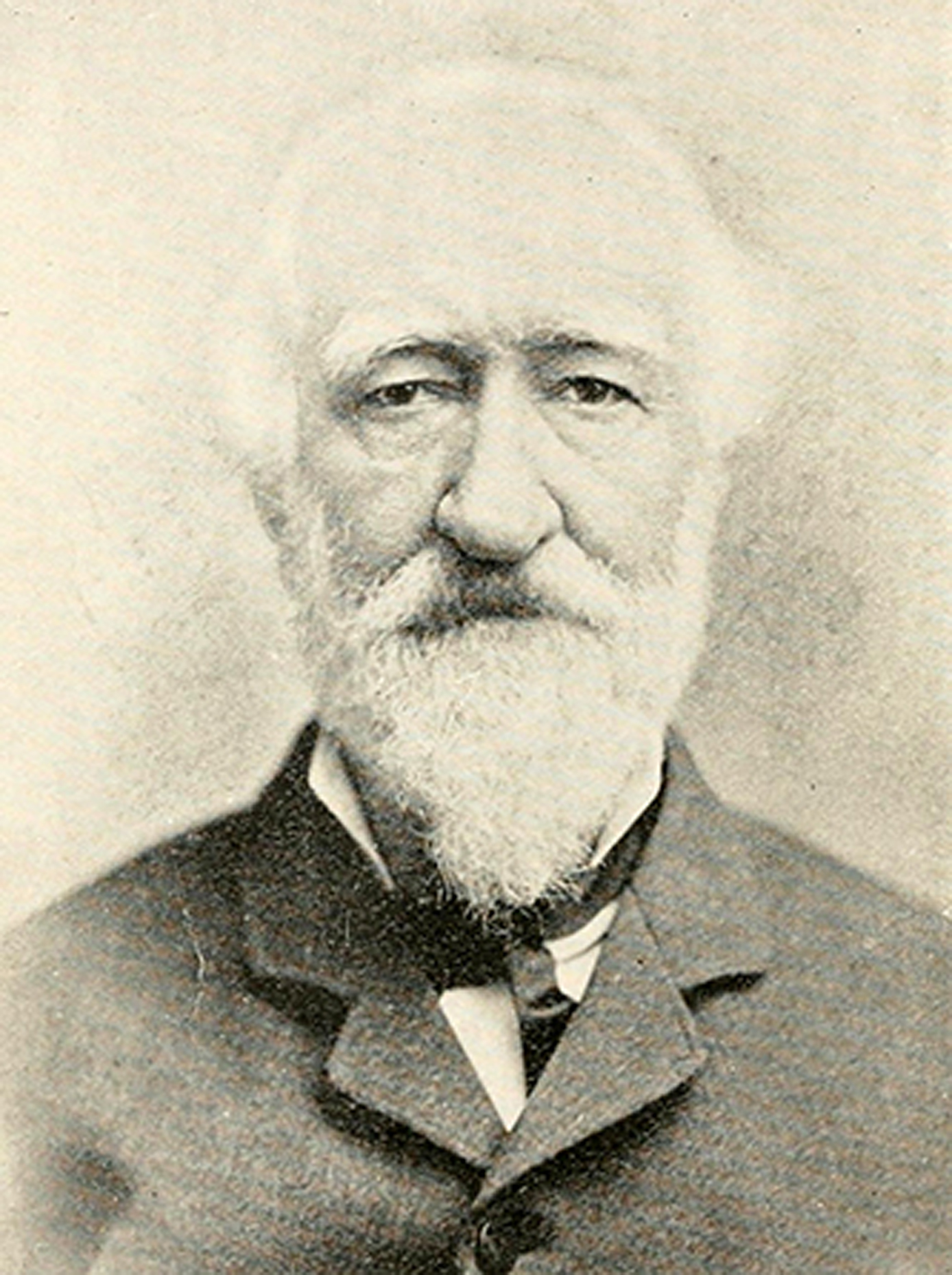
- Jones in an 1899 book

Member of the South Carolina Senate from the York County district
- In office 1865–1866
- Succeeded by: George W. Williams

Member of the North Carolina House of Representatives from the Orange County district
- In office 1848–1851 Serving with Patterson H. McDade, John Stockard, Giles Mebane, Daniel A. Montgomery, Bartlett A. Durham, George Patterson
- Preceded by: Chesley F. Faucett, John B. Leathers, Sidney Smith, Giles Mebane
- Succeeded by: J. T. Lyon, Samuel F. Phillips, Josiah Turner Jr., Bartlett A. Durham
- In office 1840–1843 Serving with Michael W. Holt, Nathaniel I. King, William Alexander Graham, James Graham, Julius S. Bracken, Henry K. Nash, John Stockard
- Preceded by: Herbert Sims, Benjamin Trollinger, William Alexander Graham, John Stockard
- Succeeded by: Loftin K. Pratt, Giles Mebane, Chesley F. Faucett, John B. Leathers

Personal details
- Born: August 17, 1813 Northampton County, North Carolina, U.S.
- Died: December 1, 1899 (aged 86) Columbia, South Carolina, U.S.
- Resting place: Elmwood Cemetery; Columbia, South Carolina, U.S.
- Party: Democratic
- Spouse: Annie Isabella Iredell (m. 1836)
- Relations: Allen Jones (grandfather)
- Children: 10, including Iredell and Johnstone
- Education: University of North Carolina at Chapel Hill
- Occupation: Politician; military officer; planter

Cadwallader Jones Jr. (August 17, 1813 – December 1, 1899) was an American politician. He served in the North Carolina House of Commons and the South Carolina Senate. He was a planter and slave owner and served in the Confederate States Army attaining the rank of colonel.

== Early life ==
Cadwallader Jones Jr. was born on August 17, 1813, at Mount Gallant, the home of his maternal grandfather Allen Jones, in Northampton County, North Carolina. His mother was Rebecca Long, daughter of Colonel Lunsford Long. His father was Cadwallader Jones, one of the largest slave holders in the region and a U.S. Navy officer during the War of 1812. His grandfather Cadwallader Jones was aide-de-camp to General Lafayette and a captain in Baylor's regiment during the Revolutionary War. At the age of 19, Jones graduated from the University of North Carolina at Chapel Hill. He became licensed to practice law in the county courts in March 1835 and in the superior courts in July 1836.

== Career ==
In 1836, Jones began practicing law in Orange County, North Carolina. In 1840, he ran as a Democrat for the North Carolina House of Commons. He was the only Democrat elected to represent Orange County that election, with the single senate and three other Commons seats going to Whigs. He served in the House of Commons from 1840 to 1843 and from 1848 to 1851. He was elected as solicitor of the 4th Judicial Circuit Court in 1842. He was elected again as solicitor in 1850. He resigned as solicitor in August 1854. He was a planter and slave owner.

In 1861, Jones volunteered for the Confederate States Army. He helped organize and served as captain of Company H of the 1st South Carolina Volunteers. He was promoted to major of the 12th South Carolina Infantry Regiment, serving under colonel R. M. G. Dunnovant and lieutenant colonel Barnes. At Hilton Head, South Carolina, he was in command of four companies in the regiment. His regiment was later transferred to Virginia and he served under General Maxcy Gregg and later under General Samuel McGowan. He served in the battles of Mechanicsville, Cold Harbor, Frazer's Farm, Malvern Hill, Second Manassas, Ox Hill, and Harper's Ferry. At Fredericksburg, he was in command of his regiment. He was promoted to lieutenant colonel and after the Battle of Sharpsburg, he was promoted to colonel.

Jones ran for governor of North Carolina, but was unsuccessful. He sold Mount Gallant on the Roanoke River and purchased Mount Gallant in York County, South Carolina, of 5,000 acres (2,000 ha). He also purchased a plantation on the Black Warrior River in Greensboro, Alabama.

In 1864, Jones was elected to the South Carolina Senate, representing York County. He was defeated by George W. Williams in the election of 1865. He was a delegate to the 1865 South Carolina state convention. Following the war, he continued to work as a planter. In January 1873, he became editor of the Rock Hill Lantern.

Jones served as a trustee of the University of North Carolina at Chapel Hill from 1840 to 1857.

== Personal life ==
Jones married Annie Isabella Iredell, daughter of Frances (née Johnstone) and North Carolina governor James Iredell Jr., on January 5, 1836. They had 10 children, Rebecca, Frances, Iredell, Cadwallader Jr., Allen, Johnstone, Wilie, Mrs. T. C. Robertson, H. Pride, and Mrs. J. S. Coles. His wife died in 1897. His son Iredell became mayor of Rock Hill and served in the South Carolina legislature. His son Johnstone founded the newspaper Rock Hill Lantern and served in the California legislature. Jones lived in Rock Hill.

Jones died on December 1, 1899, at the Columbia home of his son-in-law, Dr. T. C. Robinson. He was buried in Elmwood Cemetery of Columbia.

== Legacy ==
According to one source, John Paul Jones adopted the surname Jones after meeting with Jones's sons, Allen and Wilie.

== Works ==
- Jones, Cadwallader (1900) A Genealogical History
