= North Carolina General Assembly of 1860–1861 =

Legislative term in US state of North Carolina

73rd North Carolina General Assembly (1860-1861)
←	1858–1859	1862–1864	→
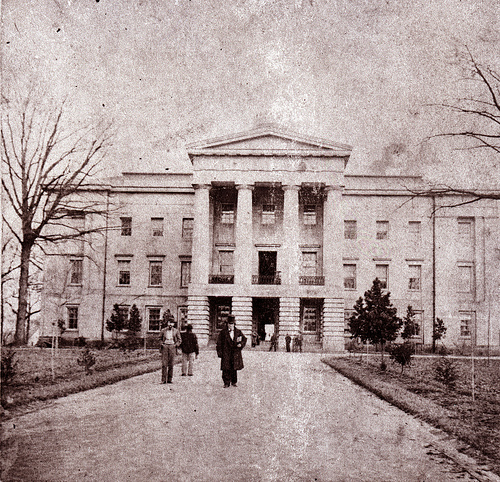
- North Carolina State Capital in 1861

Overview
- Legislative body: North Carolina General Assembly
- Jurisdiction: North Carolina, United States
- Meeting place: State Capital building in Raleigh
- Term: 1860–1861

North Carolina Senate
- Members: 50 Senators
- President of the Senate: Henry Toole Clark
- Party control: Southern Democrats

House of Commons
- Members: 120 Representatives
- Speaker of the House: William Theophilus Dortch
- Party control: Southern Democrats

The North Carolina General Assembly of 1860–1861 met in Raleigh, North Carolina in regular session from November 19, 1860, to February 25, 1861. They met in extra sessions from May 1, 1861, to May 13, 1861, and from August 15, 1861, to September 23, 1861. This General Assembly decided that each county should vote for special delegates who would decide whether North Carolina should secede from the Union. On May 20, 1861, those special delegates convened in Raleigh and voted unanimously that the state would no longer be a part of the United States of America.

== Councilors of State ==
The following persons were elected as Councilors of State on December 20, 1860:

- John W. Cuningham Person
- W. L. Hilliard
- Council Wooten, Lenoir County
- W. A. Ferguson
- John J. Long
- David Murphy
- Jesse F. Graves, Surry County

== Legislation ==
The general assembly passed numerous laws in 1860–1861, including the creation of Clay County from Cherokee County; creation of Mitchell County from Burke, Caldwell, McDowell, Watauga, and Yancey Counties; and the creation of Transylvania County from Henderson and Jackson Counties.

The North Carolina Constitution was amended on May 20, 1861, to "dissolve the union between the State of North Carolina and the other states united with her under the compact of government entitled the Constitution of the United States of America."

== Members ==
=== House of Commons ===
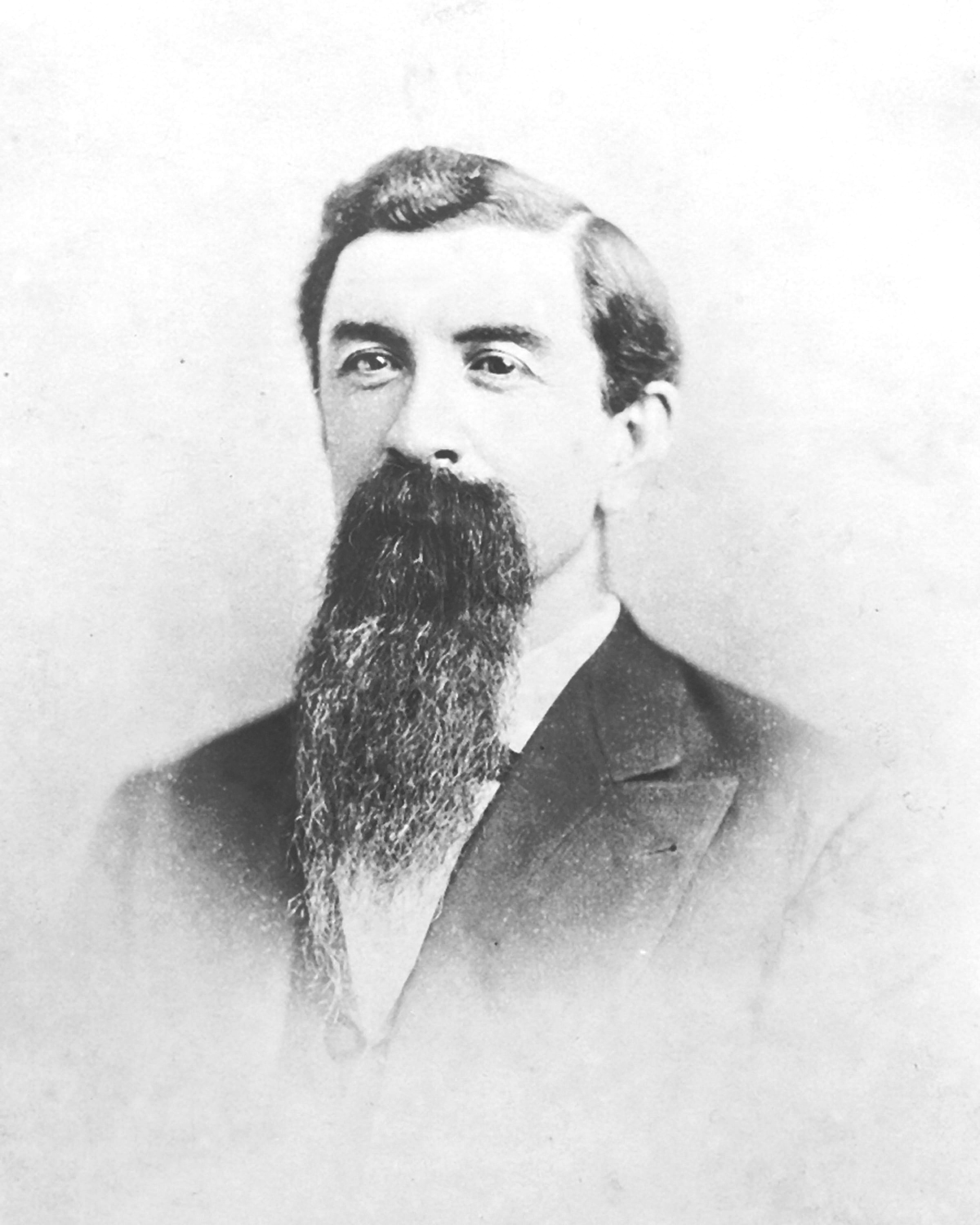
Rep. Leonidas LaFayette Polk

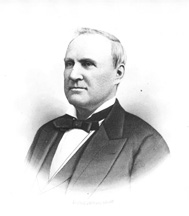
Rep. Augustus Summerfield Merrimon

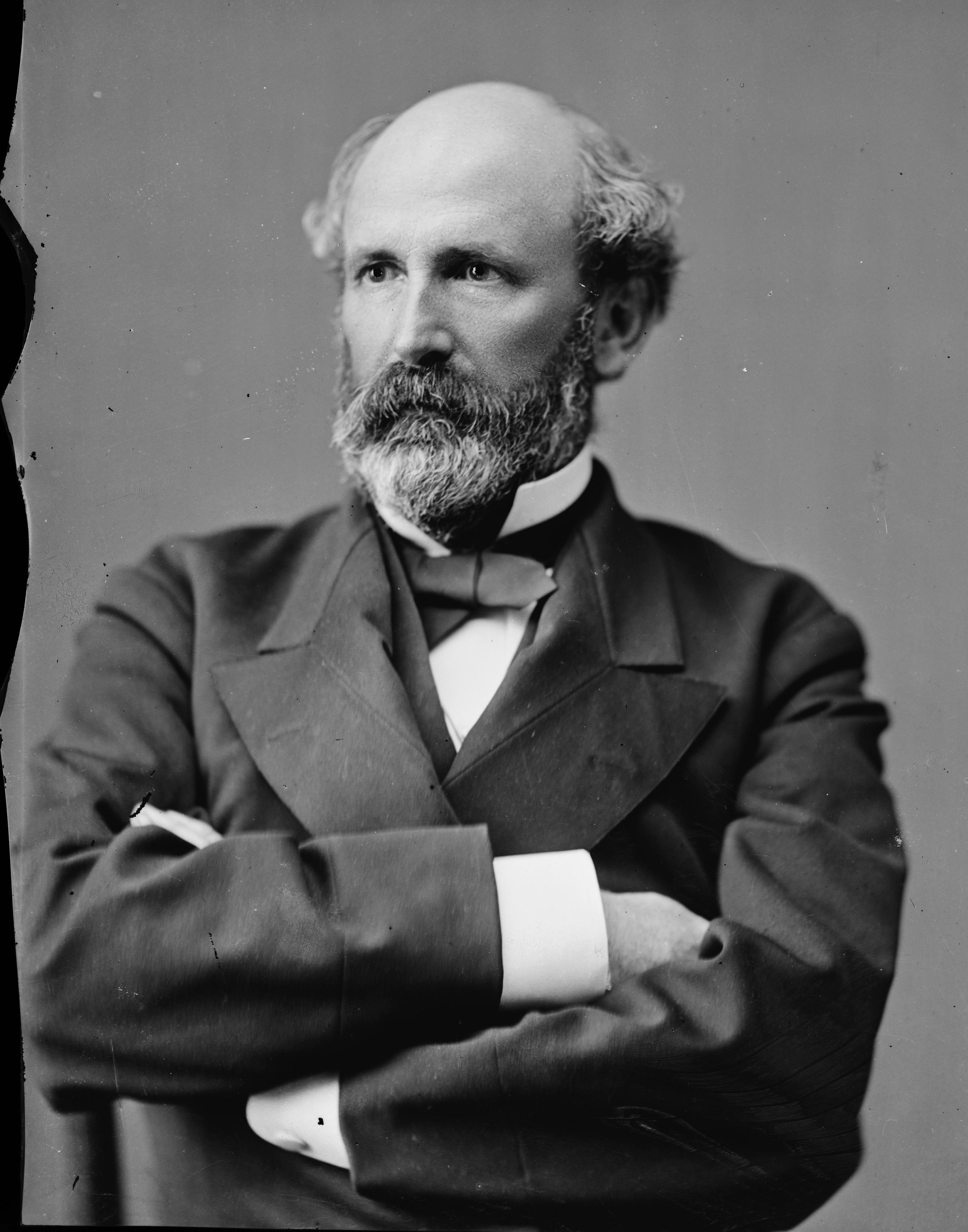
Rep. Matt Whitaker Ransom

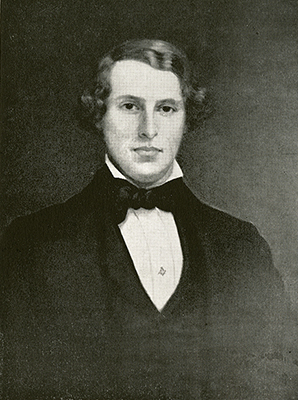
Rep. Richard Spaight Donnell

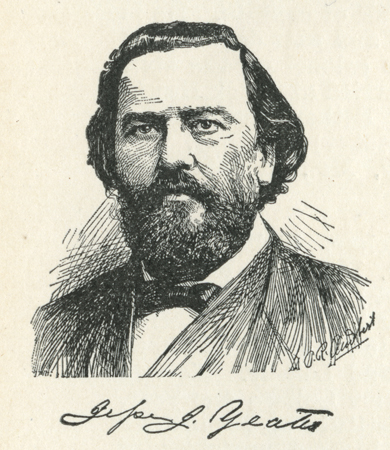
Rep. Jesse Johnson Yeates

There were, per the North Carolina Constitution amended in 1825, 120 representatives in the House of Commons. Some counties had more representatives based on the county population. William T. Dortch was elected Speaker of the House of Commons. He served until he left to become the North Carolina Senator for the Congress of the Confederate States of America from 1862 to 1865. Nathan Neely Fleming was elected as Speaker after he departed. Edward Cantwell served as clerk. Eighty-two of the representatives were Southern Democrats.

County	No of Members in County	Member's Name (party in 1860)
Alamance	2	Giles Mebane (Whig)
Alamance	2	John Tapscott
Alexander	1	John M. Carson
Anson	2	Edward R. Liles
Anson	2	Leonidas LaFayette Polk (Whig)
Ashe	1	Thomas N. Crumpler
Ashe	1	James M. Gentry
Beaufort	2	William T. Marsh
Beaufort	2	Richard Spaight Donnell (Whig)
Bertie	2	Peyton T. Henry
Bertie	2	John R. Ferguson
Bladen	1	Charles T. Davis
Brunswick	1	Thomas D. Meares
Buncombe	1	Augustus Summerfield Merrimon (Southern Democrat)
Burke	1	John H. Pearson
Cabarrus	1	William S. Harris
Caldwell	1	William W. Dickson
Camden	1	Dennis D. Ferebee
Carteret	1	David W. Whitehurst
Caswell	2	John Kerr (Whig)
Caswell	2	Elijah K. Withers
Caswell	2	Samuel P. Hill
Catawba	1	Jonas Cline
Chatham	3	Robert N. Green
Chatham	3	William P. Taylor
Chatham	3	Turner Bynum
Cherokee	1	George W. Hayes
Chowan	1	Richard H. Small
Cleveland	2	Abraham G. Waters
Cleveland	2	John R. Logan
Columbus	1	Nathan L. Williamson
Craven	2	Frederick E. Alfred
Craven	2	Charles C. Clark
Cumberland	3	James S. Harrington
Cumberland	3	John C. Williams
Cumberland	3	Clement G. Wright
Currituck	1	Burwell M. Baxter
Davidson	2	Edmund B. Clark
Davidson	2	Lewis Hanes
Davie	1	Henry B. Howard
Duplin	2	John D. Stanford
Duplin	2	James G. Branch
Edgecombe	2	Robert R. Bridges
Edgecombe	2	James S. Woodard
Forsyth	2	Philip Barrow
Forsyth	2	John F. Poindexter
Franklin	1	William F. Green
Gaston	1	James H. White
Gates	1	John Boothe
Granville	3	James M. Bullock
Granville	3	Samuel H. Cannady
Granville	3	William H.P. Jenkins
Greene	1	Arthur D. Speight
Guilford	3	Julius L. Gorrell
Guilford	3	Cyrus P. Mendenhall
Guilford	3	Charles E. Shober
Halifax	2	Archibald H. Davis
Halifax	2	William B. Pope
Haywood	1	Samuel L. Love
Henderson	1	Joseph P. Jordan
Hertford	1	Jesse Johnson Yeates (Southern Democrat)
Hyde	1	Tillman Farrow
Iredell	2	Asa B.F. Gaither
Iredell	2	Absalom Knox Simonton
Jackson	1	James R. Love
Jackson	1	Allen Fisher
Johnston	2	James Mitchiner
Johnston	2	William H. Watson
Jones	1	William P. Ward
Lenoir	1	John C. Wooten
Lincoln	1	John F. Hoke
Lincoln	1	V. A. McBee
Macon	1	David W. Siler
Macon	1	Henry G. Woodfin
Madison	1	John A. Fagg
Martin	1	Joshua L. Ewell
McDowell	1	Charles H. Burgin
Mecklenburg	2	Stephen W. Davis
Mecklenburg	2	John McK. Potts
Montgomery	1	Edmund G.L. Barringer
Moore	1	Alexander Kelly
Nash	1	Henry G. Williams
New Hanover	2	Samuel J. Person
New Hanover	2	Daniel Shaw
Northampton	2	Matthew Whitaker Ransom
Northampton	2	William W. Peebles
Onslow	1	James H. Foy
Orange	2	Hugh B. Guthrie
Orange	2	William N. Patterson
Pasquotank	1	John T. Williams
Perquimans	1	Nathan Newby
Person	1	John D. Wilkerson
Pitt	2	Burton J. Albritton
Pitt	2	Churchill Perkins
Randolph	2	Isaac H. Foust
Randolph	2	Thomas L. Winslow
Richmond	1	John G. Blue
Robeson	2	Alexander McMillan
Robeson	2	Eli Wishart
Rockingham	2	Rawley Galloway
Rockingham	2	Thomas S. Slade
Rowan	2	Newberry F. Hall
Rowan	2	Nathan Neely Fleming
Rutherford	2	Champion T.N. Davis
Rutherford	2	Berryman H. Paget
Sampson	2	George W. Autrey
Sampson	2	Nehemiah C. Faison
Stanly	1	Lafayette Green
Stokes	1	Horatio P. Kallum
Surry	1	Harrison M. Waugh
Tyrrell	1	Charles McCleese
Union	1	Cyrus Q. Lemmond
Wake	3	Henry Mordecai
Wake	3	Sion H. Rogers
Wake	3	John P. H. Russ
Warren	2	Joseph B. Batchelor
Warren	2	William H. Clark
Washington	1	Charles Latham
Watauga	1	George N. Folk
Watauga	1	Thomas Farthing
Wayne	2	William Theophilus Dortch (Speaker, Southern Democrat)
Wayne	2	Marcus K. Crawford
Wilkes	2	Augustus H. Martin
Wilkes	2	Phineas T. Horton
Yadkin	1	Andrew C. Cowles
Yancey	1	Jacob Weaver Bowman

=== Senate ===
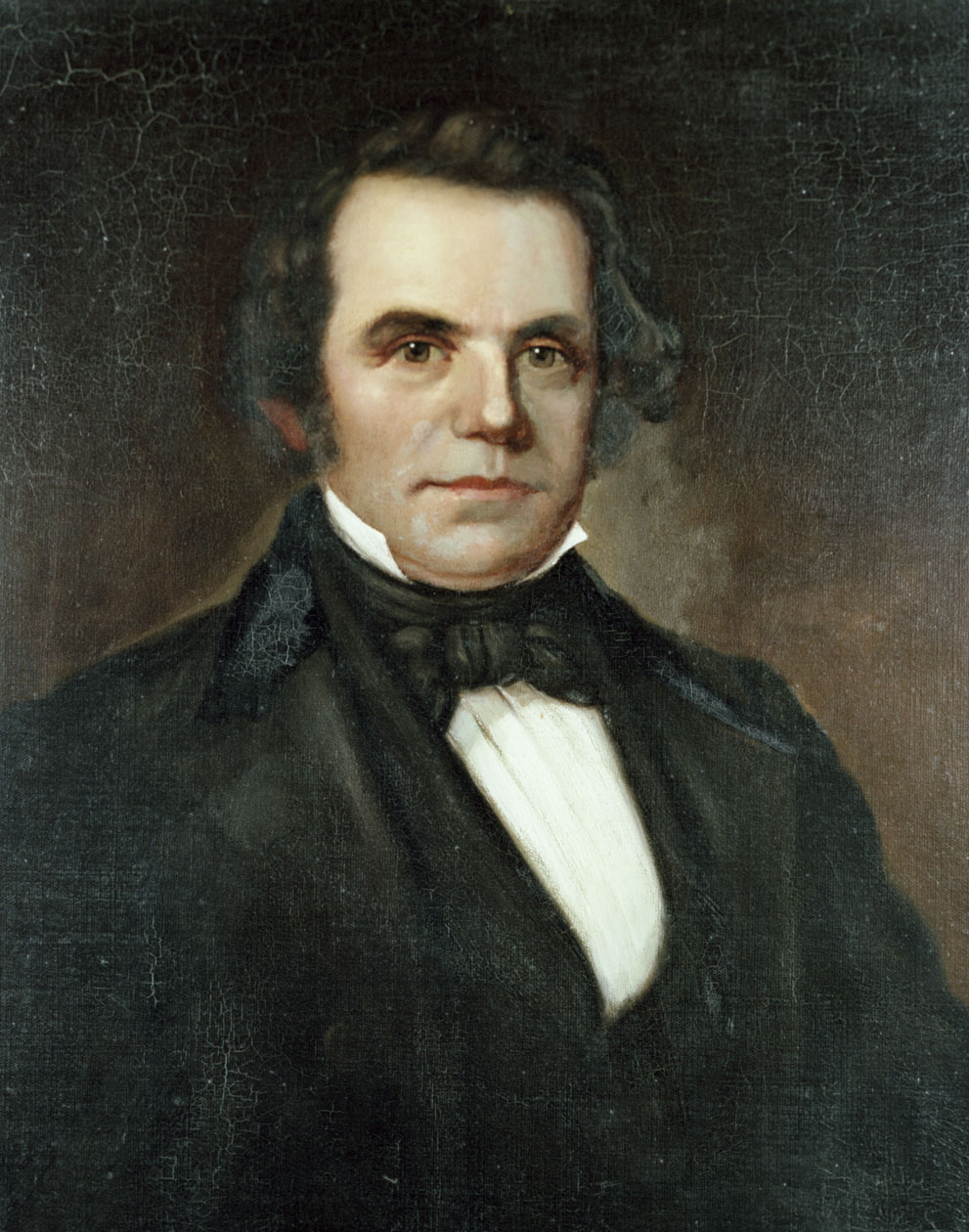
Sen. Henry Toole Clark

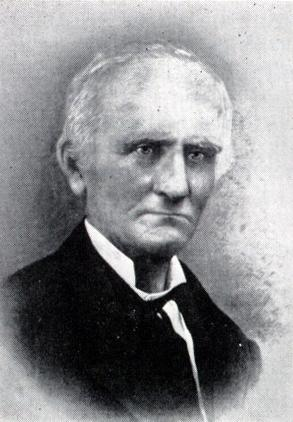
Sen. Jonathan Worth

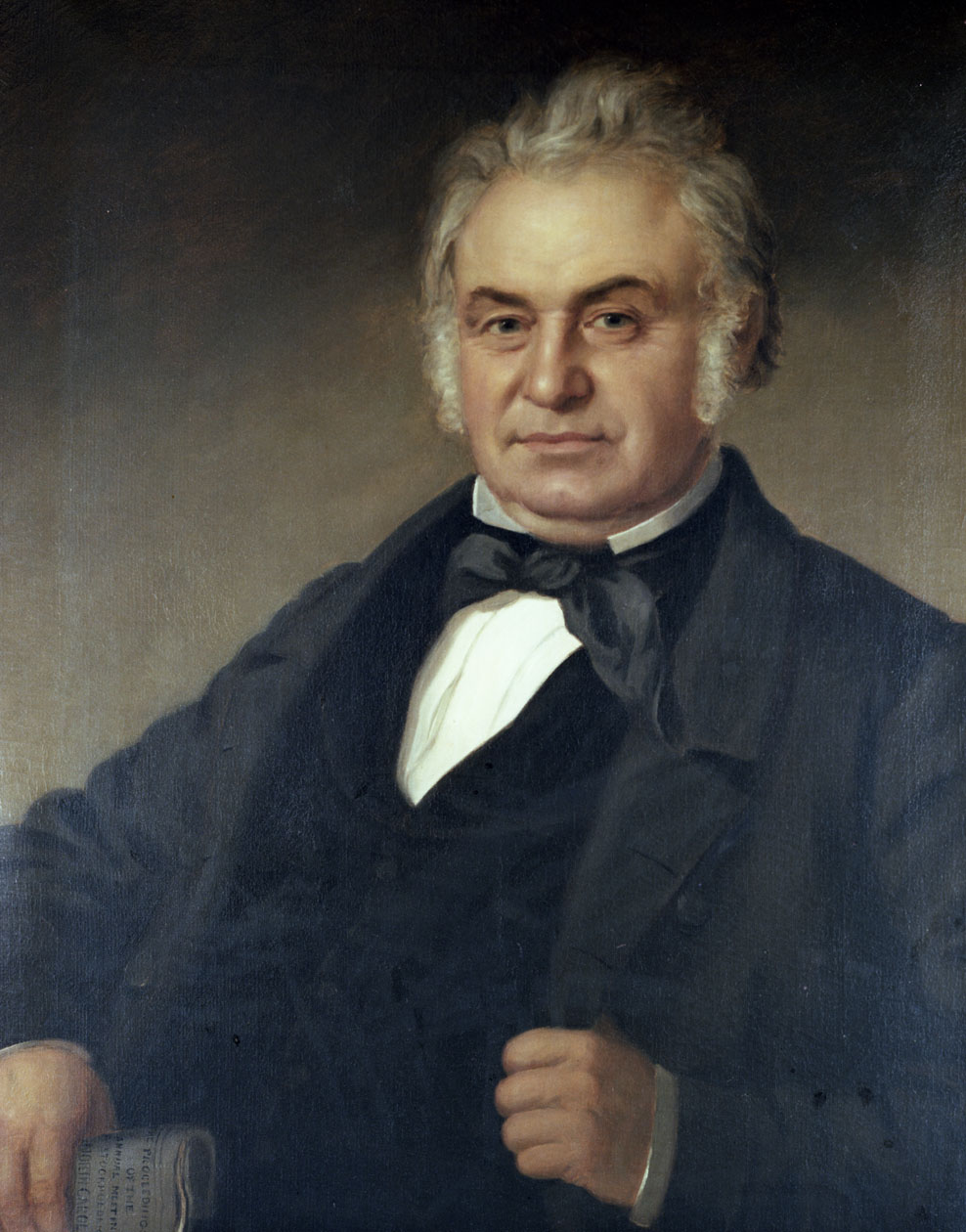
Sen. John Motley Morehead

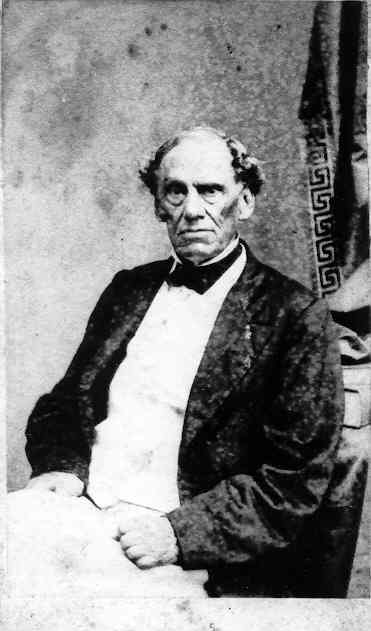
Sen. Bedford Brown

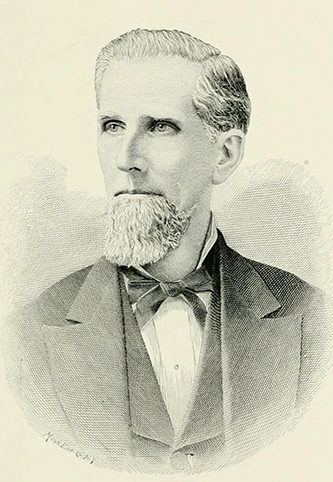
Sen. James Graham Ramsay

Henry Toole Clark was elected Speaker or President of the Senate. As such, he was first in line of succession to the Governor since there was no Lieutenant Governor until 1868. When Governor John Willis Ellis died of tuberculosis on July 7, 1861, Senator Clark took over as Governor and remained in that position until September 8, 1862. He was thrust into this leadership position just as the U.S. Civil War started. Thirty-two of the Senators were Southern Democrats.

The clerk of the Senate was J.W. Alspaugh. Senator William Holland Thomas was an adopted chief of the Eastern Band of the Cherokee Nation and represented their interests as he served in the Senate from 1849 to 1861.

Senators William Waightstill Avery and John Motley Morehead served as delegates from North Carolina to the Provisional Congress of the Confederate States of America in the third through fifth sessions in 1861 and 1862.

The following table lists the Senators from the 50 Districts in North Carolina.

District	Counties represented	Senator (party)	Home County
1	Pasquotank & Perquimans	James M. Whedbee	Perquimans
2	Camden & Currituck	Benjamin T. Simmons	Currituck
3	Chowan & Gates	Mills H. Eure	Gates
4	Hyde & Tyrrell	Jones Spencer	Tyrrell
5	Northampton	Joseph M.S. Rogers	Northampton
6	Hertford	Joseph B. Slaughter	Hertford
7	Bertie	David Outlaw (Whig)	Bertie
8	Martin & Washington	Jesse R. Stubbs	Martin
9	Halifax	Matthew Cary Whitaker	Halifax
10	Edgecombe	Henry Toole Clark (Southern Democrat, Speaker)	Edgecombe
11	Pitt	Elias J. Blount	Pitt
12	Beaufort	Frederick Grist	Beaufort
13	Craven	Nathan H. Street	Craven
14	Carteret & Jones	M.F. Arendell	Carteret
15	Greene & Lenoir	James P. Speight	Greene
16	New Hanover	Eli W. Hall	New Hanover
17	Duplin	James Dickson	Duplin
18	Onslow	Lott W. Humphrey	Onslow
19	Bladen, Brunswick, & Columbus	John D. Taylor	Brunswick
20	Cumberland	Duncan Shaw	Cumberland
21	Sampson	Thomas I. Faison	Sampson
22	Wayne	William K. Lane	Wayne
23	Johnston	J.W.B. Watson	Johnston
24	Wake	Moses A. Bledsoe	Wake
25	Nash	A.G. Taylor	Nash
26	Franklin	Washington Harris	Franklin
27	Warren	Thomas J. Pritchard	Warren
28	Granville	C.H.K. Taylor	Granville
29	Person	C.S. Winstead	Person
30	Orange	Josiah Turner	Orange
31	Alamance & Randolph	Jonathan Worth (Southern Democrat)	Randolph
32	Chatham	W.S. Harris	Chatham
33	Montgomery & Moore	Willis D. Dowd	Moore
34	Richmond, & Robeson	Alfred Dockery (Know Nothing)	Richmond
35	Anson & Union	Samuel H. Walkup	Union
36	Guilford	John Motley Morehead (Whig)	Guilford
37	Caswell	Bedford Brown (Southern Democrat)	Caswell
38	Rockingham	Francis L. Simpson	Rockingham
39	Mecklenburg	John Walker	Mecklenburg
40	Cabarrus & Stanly	Victor C. Barringer	Cabarrus
41	Davie & Rowan	James Graham Ramsay	Rowan
42	Davidson	John W. Thomas	Davidson
43	Forsyth & Stokes	John A. Waugh	Forsyth
44	Ashe, Surry, Watauga, & Yadkin	Joseph H. Dobson	Surry
45	Alexander, Iredell, Wilkes	Leander Q. Sharpe	Iredell
46	Burke, Caldwell, & McDowell	William Waightstill Avery (Southern Democrat)	Burke
47	Catawba, Gaston, & Lincoln	J. Stowe	Lincoln
48	Cleveland & Rutherford	A.W. Burton	Cleveland
49	Buncombe, Henderson, Madison, & Yancey	Marcus Erwin	Buncombe
50	Cherokee, Haywood, Jackson, & Macon	William Holland Thomas	Jackson

== See also ==
- List of North Carolina state legislatures
