= John Stockard =

American politician (died 1861)

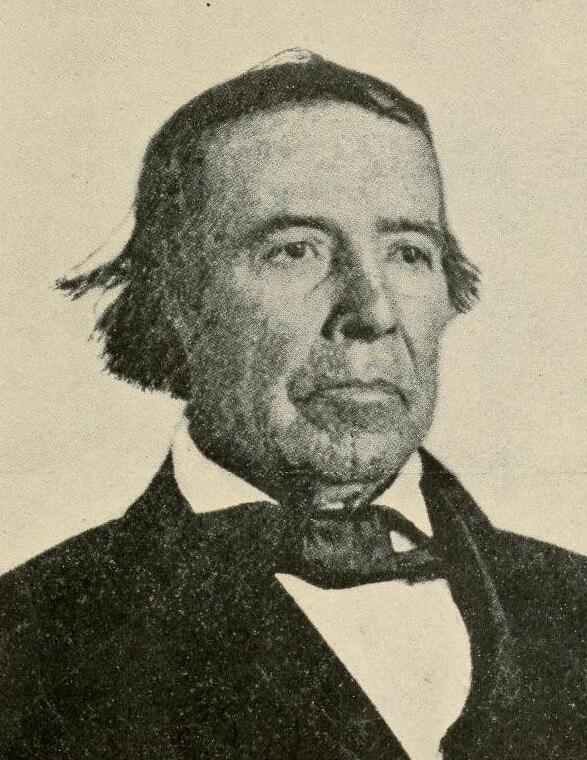
- Stockard in a 1900 publication

Member of the North Carolina House of Representatives from the Orange County district
- In office 1848–1849 Serving with Cadwallader Jones Jr., Patterson H. McDade, Giles Mebane
- Preceded by: Chesley F. Faucett, John B. Leathers, Sidney Smith, Giles Mebane
- Succeeded by: Daniel A. Montgomery, Bartlett A. Durham, George Patterson, Cadwallader Jones Jr.
- In office 1842–1843 Serving with Julius S. Bracken, Henry K. Nash, Cadwallader Jones Jr.
- Preceded by: William Alexander Graham, James Graham, Michael W. Holt, Nathaniel I. King, Cadwallader Jones Jr.
- Succeeded by: Loftin K. Pratt, Chesley F. Faucett, John B. Leathers, Giles Mebane
- In office 1833–1839 Serving with Joseph Allison, Hugh Waddell, John Boon, Herbert Sims, Benjamin Trollinger, Nathaniel I. King, William Alexander Graham
- Preceded by: Priestly H. Mangum, Joseph Allison
- Succeeded by: William Alexander Graham, James Graham, Michael W. Holt, Nathaniel I. King, Cadwallader Jones Jr.
- In office 1826–1831 Serving with Thomas H. Taylor, John Boon, Hugh Waddell, Joseph Allison
- Preceded by: William McCauley, John Boon
- Succeeded by: James Mebane, Joseph Allison

Personal details
- Born: Mount Hermon, Alamance County, North Carolina, U.S.
- Died: 1861
- Resting place: Mount Hermon Cemetery
- Party: Democratic (before 1856); Know Nothing (1856)
- Spouse(s): Jane Stuart (died) Catharine Albright
- Relations: William Trousdale (cousin)
- Children: 11
- Occupation: Politician; farmer

John Stockard (died 1861) was an American politician from North Carolina.

== Early life ==
John Stockard was one of 10 children born to Ellen (née Trousdale) and James Stockard (or Stockhardt). He was born at the Stockard home in Mount Hermon in modern-day Alamance County, North Carolina. His father was a soldier in the Continental Army during the Revolutionary War. His cousin was Tennessee governor William Trousdale. In the early 19th-century, the rest of the Stockard family moved to Tennessee, but he remained living on the south bank of the Great Alamance Creek.

== Career ==
Stockard volunteered and served in the War of 1812. Due to his war service, he was recognized for the rest of his life as a colonel. Stockard was an elder in the Presbyterian church in Mount Hermon, but with others left to form a Methodist Protestant Church in Mount Hermon. In 1834, Stockard became a trustee of Mt. Hermon Church in Graham.

Stockard was a Democrat. He served as a member of the North Carolina House of Commons, representing Orange County from 1826 to 1831 and from 1833 to 1839 and from 1842 to 1843 and from 1848 to 1849. Along with Giles Mebane, he supported the bill that formed Alamance County. He served on the committee to select a site for the county seat. He also supported legislation for the State Hospital for the Insane and the chartering of the North Carolina Railroad.

In 1856, Stockard ran as a Know Nothing for the Alamance County seat in the House of Commons, but was unsuccessful. He was a farmer.

== Personal life ==
Stockard married Jane Stuart, daughter of Elizabeth (née Bradshaw) and Samuel Stuart, of Orange County. They had three children, Ellen, Samuel and Elizabeth. His wife died and then he married Catharine Albright, daughter of Mary (née Gibbs) and Henry Albright (Albrecht). She was the sister of General Nicholas Gibbs of the American Indian Wars. The couple had eight children, Jane Stuart, James Gibbs, Mary, Margaret, Nancy, William, Lettie, and John Richard. He lived his entire life at the Stockard homestead in Mount Hermon.

Stockard died in 1861. He was buried in Mount Hermon Cemetery.
