= Henry K. Nash =

American politician (1817–1897)

Member of the North Carolina House of Representatives from the Orange County district
- In office 1842–1843 Serving with Julius S. Bracken, Cadwallader Jones Jr., John Stockard
- Preceded by: William Alexander Graham, James Graham, Michael W. Holt, Nathaniel I. King, Cadwallader Jones Jr.
- Succeeded by: Chesley F. Faucett, John B. Leathers, Giles Mebane, Loftin K. Pratt

Personal details
- Born: January 25, 1817
- Died: November 3, 1897 (aged 80) Tarboro, North Carolina, U.S.
- Resting place: Hillsborough, North Carolina, U.S.
- Party: Whig
- Spouse: Mary A. Simpson (m. 1838)
- Children: 5
- Parent: Frederick Nash (father)

Henry K. Nash (January 25, 1817 – November 3, 1897) was an American politician from North Carolina.

== Early life ==
Henry K. Nash was born on January 25, 1817, as the second son of Frederick Nash. His father was a chief justice. He graduated from the University of North Carolina at Chapel Hill in 1836.

== Career ==
Nash was a lawyer in Hillsborough. He was a Whig. He served as a member of the North Carolina House of Commons, representing Orange County from 1842 to 1843. In 1843, Nash was the Whig nominee for district 7 of the U.S. House of Representatives, but he lost the election to John R. J. Daniel. In 1844, he withdrew himself from consideration for the Whig nomination in the House of Commons election. In 1849, he ran as a Whig for the district 5 seat in the U.S. House of Representatives, but lost to incumbent Abraham Watkins Venable. He was a delegate to the 1844 and 1852 Whig National Conventions.

In 1850, Nash succeeded Priestly H. Mangum as solicitor of Orange County. In 1860, he declined the Whig nomination for the House of Commons. In March 1861, he ran as a Disunionist for the North Carolina state convention, but lost to William Alexander Graham and John Berry. He lost again to Graham and Berry in May 1861 for the next state convention.

== Personal life ==
Nash married Mary A. Simpson, daughter of Samuel Simpson, of New Bern on October 23, 1838. He had a son and four daughters, Henry K. Jr., Sally, Annie, Sue, and Mrs. William L. DeRosset. He was a member of the Episcopal Church. He lived in Hillsborough.

Nash died on November 3, 1897, in Tarboro, North Carolina. He was buried in Hillsborough.
