= Patterson H. McDade =

American politician (died 1877)

Member of the North Carolina House of Representatives from the Orange County district
- In office 1848–1849 Serving with Cadwallader Jones Jr., John Stockard, Giles Mebane
- Preceded by: Chesley F. Faucett, John B. Leathers, Sidney Smith, Giles Mebane
- Succeeded by: Daniel A. Montgomery, Bartlett A. Durham, George Patterson, Cadwallader Jones Jr.

Personal details
- Died: September 3, 1877 Harrellsville, North Carolina, U.S.
- Resting place: Old Chapel Hill Cemetery
- Political party: Democratic
- Children: 3
- Occupation: Politician

Patterson H. McDade (died September 3, 1877) was an American politician from North Carolina.

== Career ==
McDade ran as a Democrat for the North Carolina House of Commons in 1846, but was unsuccessful. He was later elected and served in the House of Commons, representing Orange County from 1848 to 1849.

McDade served as clerk of the Chapel Hill Baptist Church. According to family oral history, he appealed to Union soldiers not to burn the church when they were quartered in the village of Chapel Hill. Local historians and historical records refuted the claim stating that McDade tried to save the church's minute book, not the building, from destruction. He provided funds for a plank road to be built between Hillsborough and Chapel Hill.

== Personal life ==
McDade had two sons and one daughter, A. J., Wayne, and Mrs. J. T. Williams. He lived in a white two-story home near Franklin Street in Chapel Hill. He died on September 3, 1877, aged about 60, at the home of his daughter in Harrellsville. He was buried at the Old Chapel Hill Cemetery on Raleigh Road.
