= John B. Leathers =

American politician (died 1880)

Member of the North Carolina House of Representatives from the Orange County district
- In office 1844–1847 Serving with Chesley F. Faucet, Giles Mebane, Loftin K. Pratt, Sidney Smith
- Preceded by: Julius S. Bracken, Cadwallader Jones Jr., Henry K. Nash, John Stockard
- Succeeded by: Patterson H. McDade, John Stockard, Giles Mebane

Personal details
- Died: August 21, 1880 near South Lowell, Orange County, North Carolina, U.S.
- Party: Whig
- Occupation: Politician; farmer

John B. Leathers (died August 21, 1880) was an American politician from North Carolina.

== Career ==
Leathers was a farmer. He was elected as a Whig to the North Carolina House of Commons. He represented Orange County in the body from 1844 to 1847. He declined the Whig nomination for re-election in 1848.

In 1860, Leathers ran for sheriff of Orange County, but lost to incumbent Richard M. Jones.

== Personal life ==
Leathers lived near South Lowell, Orange County. He died on August 21, 1880, near South Lowell.
