= Loftin K. Pratt =

American politician and judge (died 1846)

Member of the North Carolina House of Representatives from the Orange County district
- In office 1844–1845 Serving with Chesley F. Faucett, John B. Leathers, Giles Mebane
- Preceded by: Julius S. Bracken, Cadwallader Jones Jr., Henry K. Nash, John Stockard
- Succeeded by: Sidney Smith, Chesley F. Faucett, John B. Leathers, Giles Mebane

Personal details
- Died: August 15, 1846 Orange County, North Carolina, U.S.
- Party: Whig
- Spouse: Nancy
- Children: 2
- Occupation: Politician; judge

Loftin K. Pratt (died August 15, 1846) was an American politician and judge from North Carolina.

== Career ==
Pratt was a justice of the Orange County court.

Pratt was a Whig. He served as a member of the North Carolina House of Commons, representing Orange County from 1844 to 1845. He did not seek the Whig nomination in 1846 due to poor health.

== Personal life ==
Pratt married Nancy. He had two daughters, Caroline Elizabeth and Mary Ann. He died on August 15, 1846, aged about 47, in Orange County.
