= Michael W. Holt =

American politician and physician (died 1858)

Member of the North Carolina Senate from the 31st district
- In office 1856–1857
- Preceded by: William B. Lane
- Succeeded by: Jonathan Worth

Member of the North Carolina House of Representatives from the Orange County district
- In office 1840–1841 Serving with William Alexander Graham, James Graham, Cadwallader Jones Jr., Nathaniel I. King
- Preceded by: Herbert Sims, John Stockard, Benjamin Trollinger, William Alexander Graham
- Succeeded by: Julius S. Bracken, Henry K. Nash, Cadwallader Jones Jr., John Stockard

Personal details
- Died: May 23, 1858 Alamance County, North Carolina, U.S.
- Resting place: Hillsborough, North Carolina, U.S.
- Party: Whig (before 1856); Know Nothing (1856)
- Spouse: Ann Webb (m. 1838; died 1850)
- Children: 3
- Education: University of North Carolina at Chapel Hill
- Occupation: Politician; physician

Michael W. Holt (died May 23, 1858) was an American politician and medical doctor from North Carolina. He served as a member of the North Carolina House of Commons, representing Orange County from 1840 to 1841. He was the first person to represent Alamance County in the North Carolina Senate.

== Early life ==
Holt graduated from the University of North Carolina at Chapel Hill.

== Career ==
Holt worked as a physician. He was a Whig. He served in the North Carolina House of Commons, representing Orange County from 1840 to 1841. In 1846, he declined the Whig nomination for the House of Commons.

In 1856, Holt was elected as a Know Nothing, defeating William Patterson, and served as a member of the North Carolina Senate, representing the 31st district (Alamance County and Randolph County) from 1856 to 1857. He was the first person to represent Alamance County in the state senate.

== Personal life ==
Holt married Ann Webb, daughter of Dr. James Webb, on November 13, 1838. He had three children, including Sallie. His wife died in 1850. He died on May 23, 1858, aged about 48, at his home in Alamance County. He was buried in Hillsborough.

In 1837, Holt received an honorary Master of Arts degree from the University of North Carolina at Chapel Hill.
