= Fort Defiance (Lenoir, North Carolina) =

Historic house in North Carolina, United States

- U.S. National Register of Historic Places
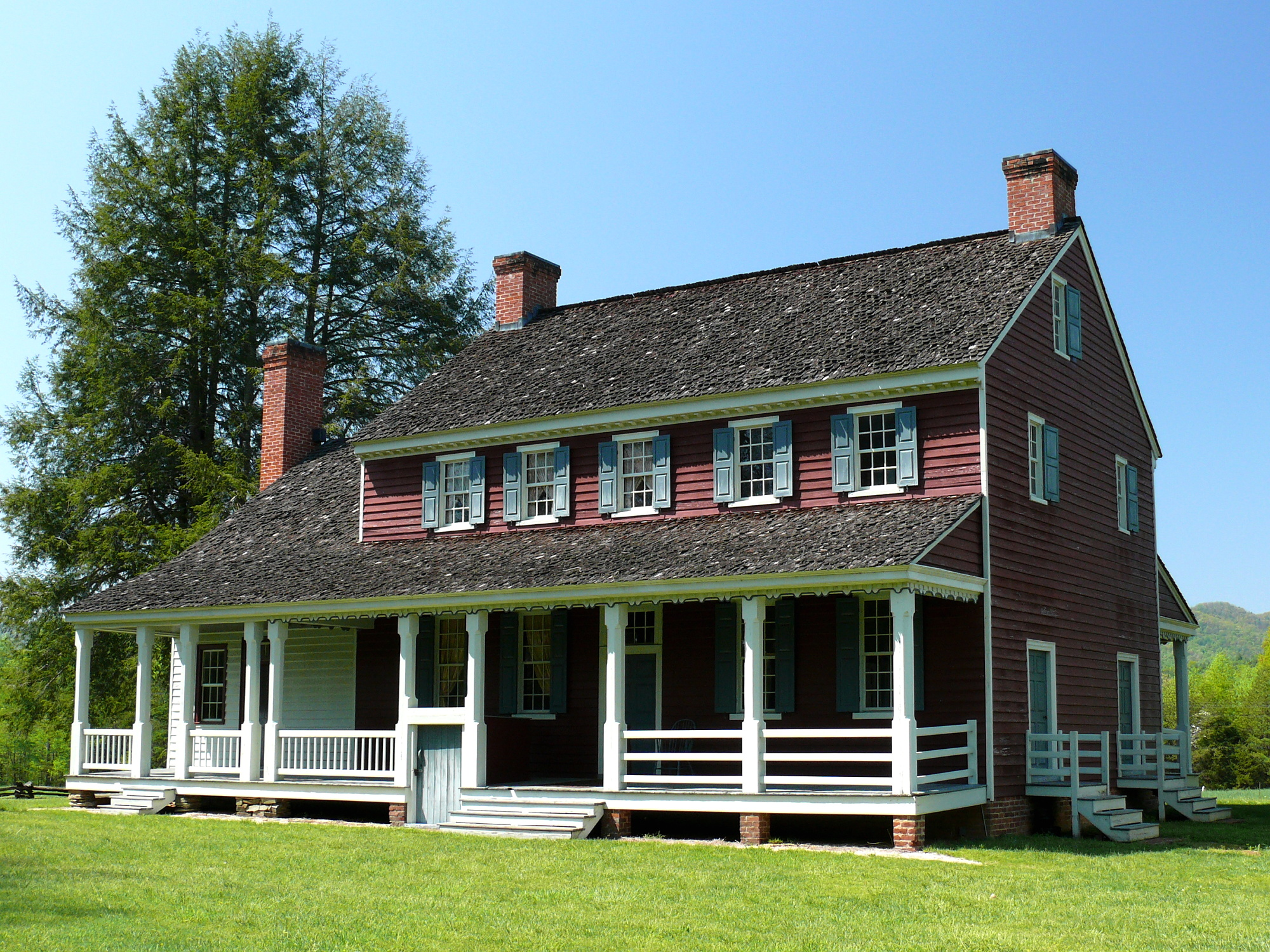
- Fort Defiance, April 2008

- Location within North Carolina Location within the United States
- Location: N of Lenoir on NC 268, Lenoir, North Carolina
- Coordinates: 36°0′46″N 81°30′16″W
- Area: 5 acres (2.0 ha)
- Built: 1788-1792, 1823
- Built by: Fields, Thomas
- NRHP reference No.: 70000444
- Added to NRHP: September 15, 1970

Fort Defiance is a historic plantation house located near Lenoir, Caldwell County, North Carolina. The main block was built between 1788 and 1792, and is a two-story, frame structure measuring 28 feet by 40 feet. A wing was added in 1823. It was the home of Revolutionary War General William Lenoir. The property was transferred to the Caldwell County Historical Society in 1965 and operated as a historic house museum.

This location on the Yadkin River was originally built upon by the troops serving under Elijah Isaacs in the summer of 1776. At the time, it was known as Fort Isaacs.

The house was listed on the National Register of Historic Places in 1970.

Western North Carolina politician George Washington Hayes married his second wife at Fort Defiance on February 6, 1842.
