= North Carolina General Assembly of 1862–1864 =

74th state legislature of North Carolina

74th North Carolina General Assembly (1862–1864)
←	1860–1861	1864–1865	→

Overview
- Legislative body: North Carolina General Assembly
- Jurisdiction: North Carolina, Confederate States of America
- Meeting place: Raleigh
- Term: 1862–1864

Senate
- Members: 50 Senators
- Speaker: Giles Mebane
- Clerk: Charles R. Thomas
- Assistant Clerk: L. C. Edwards
- Doorkeeper: William J. Page
- Assistant Doorkeeper: C. C. Tally
- Party control: Confederate Party

House of Commons
- Members: 120 Delegates
- Speaker: Robert B. Gilliam, (Note: Robert B. Gilliam was elevated to the State Superior Court bench in 1863 and Richard Spaight Donnell was elected to replace him as Speaker of the House of Commons.) Richard Spaight Donnell, Marmaduke Swain Robins (Note: Marmaduke Swain Robins was elected on November 24, 1863 when illness kept Richard Spaight Donnell from that session. See Cheney, page 356, footnote 580.)
- Speaker pro tem: William E. Mann (Note: William E. Mann served for a brief period as Speaker in the January adjourned session when Richard Donnell was ill.)
- Clerk: Henry E. Colton
- Party control: Confederate Party

Sessions
- 1st: November 17, 1862 – December 22, 1862
- 2nd: January 19, 1863 – February 12, 1863
- 3rd: June 30, 1863 – July 7, 1863
- 4th: November 23, 1863 – December 14, 1863
- 5th: May 17, 1864 – May 30, 1864

The North Carolina General Assembly of 1862–1864 met in Raleigh from November 17, 1862, to December 22, 1862. Extra sessions were held on January 19, 1863 – February 12, 1863; June 30, 1863 – July 7, 1863; November 23, 1863 – December 14, 1863; and May 17–30, 1864 . The assembly consisted of the 120 members of the North Carolina House of Commons from 82 counties and 50 senators representing one or more counties in North Carolina Senate elected by the voters in October 1862. Zebulon Baird Vance was Governor of North Carolina during this assembly. This assembly met during the American Civil War as part of the Confederate States of America. Much of the legislation passed by this assembly dealt with the managing the state and its population during wartime.

== Assembly membership ==
=== House of Commons members ===
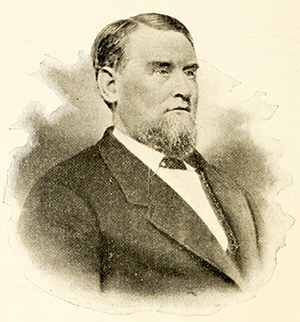
Rep. David Miller Carter, Beaufort County

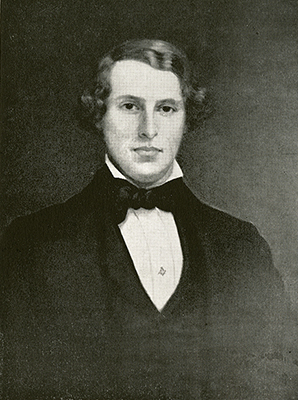
Speaker Richard Spaight Donnell

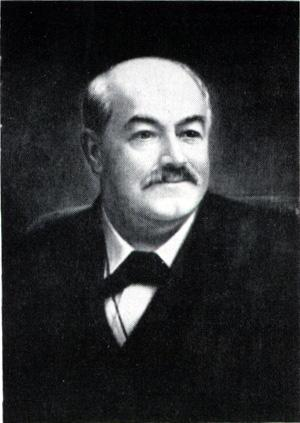
Rep Daniel Gould Fowle, Wake County

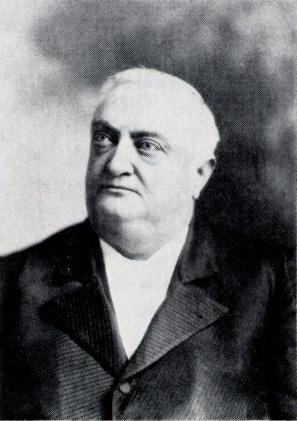
Rep. Daniel Lindsay Russell, Brunswick County

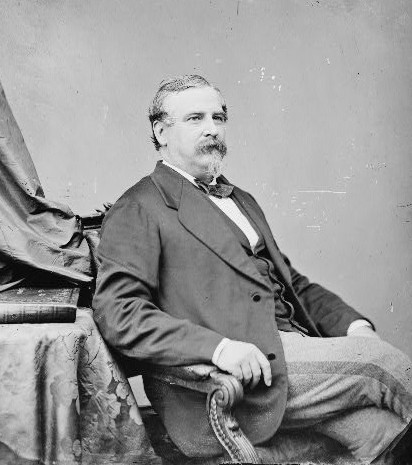
Rep. Francis Edwin Shober, Rowan County

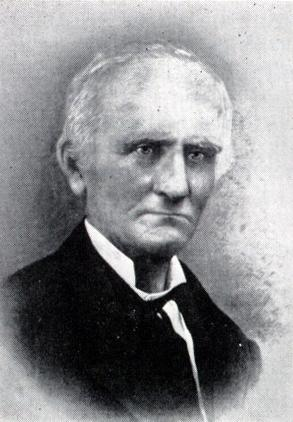
Rep. Jonathan Worth, Randolph County

There were 82 counties with 120 delegates, 5 counties with three delegates, 28 counties with two delegates, and 49 counties with one delegate. The House of Commons delegates elected a Speaker (Richard Spaight Donnell, Robert B. Gilliam, Marmaduke Swain Robins, William E. Mann), Clerk, Assistant Clerk, Doorkeeper, and Assistant Doorkeeper. The following delegates to the House of Commons were elected by the voters of North Carolina to represent each county and district:

County	Delegates per County	Delegate
Alamance	2	Rufus Yancey McAden
Alamance	2	E. F. Watson
Alexander	1	John M. Carson
Anson	2	R. H. Burns
Anson	2	Purdie Richardson
Ashe	1	James M. Gentry
Beaufort	2	Richard Spaight Donnell
Beaufort	2	David Miller Carter
Bertie	2	Peyton T. Henry
Bertie	2	James Bond
Bladen	1	J.W. Russ
Brunswick	1	Daniel Lindsay Russell, Jr.
Buncombe	1	John Burgin
Burke	1	John Parks
Cabarrus	1	William S. Harris
Caldwell	1	Matthias A. Bernhardt
Camden	1	John Forbes
Carteret	1	Unknown/Vacant
Caswell	2	Samuel S. Harrison
Caswell	2	William Long
Catawba	1	George S. Hooper (Note: At some point George S. Hooper resigned and Horace L. Robards replaced him. W. P. Reinhardt attended the last special session. Robards may have joined the Confederate Army)
Catawba	1	Horace L. Robards
Catawba	1	W .P. Reinhardt
Chatham	3	Thomas B. Harris
Chatham	3	William J. Headen
Chatham	3	Maurice Q. Waddell
Cherokee	1	James H. Bryson (Note: James H. Bryson resigned his seat at some point. John W. Fentress was elected to replace him for the third session.)
Cherokee	1	John W. Fentress
Chowan	1	Lemuel C. Benbury
Cleveland	2	John R. Logan
Cleveland	2	David Beam
Columbus	1	William M. Baldwin (Note: William M. Baldwin resigned his seat. No known replacement.)
Craven	2	J. B. J. Barrow (Note: J. B. J. Barrow died before taking office and was replaced by Thomas H. Gaskins in the second special session.)
Craven	2	Thomas H. Gaskins
Craven	2	Richard A. Russell
Cumberland	3	John McCormick
Cumberland	3	Neill McKay
Cumberland	3	Jesse G. Shepherd
Currituck	1	Burwell M. Baxter
Davidson	2	Robert L. Beall
Davidson	2	Henry Walser
Davie	1	Henry B. Howard
Duplin	2	John D. Stanford
Duplin	2	L. W. Hodges
Edgecombe	2	Robert Bynum
Edgecombe	2	David Cobb
Forsyth	2	E. Kerner
Forsyth	2	John P. Nissen
Franklin	1	A. W. Pearce
Gaston	1	A. W. Davenport
Gates	1	William H. Manning
Granville	3	Robert B. Gilliam
Granville	3	James S. Amis
Granville	3	Eugene Grissom
Greene	1	Henry H. Best
Guilford	3	R. W. Glenn
Guilford	3	M.S. Sherwood
Guilford	3	William R. Smith
Halifax	2	Archibald H. Davis
Halifax	2	Henry Joyner
Haywood	1	Samuel L. Love
Henderson	1	Alexander Henry
Hertford	1	John A. Vann
Hyde	1	Edward L. Mann
Iredell	2	Thomas A. Allison
Iredell	2	John Young
Jackson	1	Joseph Keener
Johnston	2	W. H. Avera
Johnston	2	Seth Woodall
Jones	1	Anthony E. Rhodes
Lenoir	1	William W. Dunn
Lincoln	1	Ambrose White
Macon	1	J. M. Lyle
Madison	1	Jesse Wallen
Martin	1	James Robinson
McDowell	1	William F. Craig
Mecklenburg	2	John L. Brown
Mecklenburg	2	E. C. Grier
Montgomery	1	Edmund G.L. Barringer
Moore	1	Alexander Kelly
Nash	1	Henry G. Williams
New Hanover	2	Samuel J. Person
New Hanover	2	John R. Hawes
Northampton	2	Williamn W. Peebles
Northampton	2	Samuel T. Stancil
Onslow	1	James H. Foy
Orange	2	William N. Patterson
Orange	2	John Berry
Pasquotank	1	William E. Mann
Perquimans	1	James H. Riddick
Person	1	M. D. C. Bumpass
Pitt	2	Burton J. Albritton
Pitt	2	Churchill Perkins
Randolph	2	Jonathan Worth (Note: Jonathan Worth resigned his position in the house after being elected as North Carolina State Treasurer. He was replaced by Isaac H. Foust.)
Randolph	2	Isaac H. Foust
Randolph	2	Marmaduke Swain Robins
Richmond	1	Sanders M. Ingram
Robeson	2	Neill McNeill
Robeson	2	Murdock McRae
Rockingham	2	W. J. Gilliam
Rockingham	2	James I. Reynolds
Rowan	2	Nathan Neely Fleming (Note: Nathan Neely Fleming was killed at the Battle of the Wilderness (May 5–7, 1964).)
Rowan	2	Francis Edwin Shober
Rutherford	2	A. R. Bryan
Rutherford	2	J. B. Carpenter
Sampson	2	William Kirby
Sampson	2	D. A. Bizzell (Note: D. A. Bizzell died in office and Thomas H. Powell was elected to replace him in the second session.)
Sampson	2	Thomas H. Powell
Stanly	1	Lafayette Green
Stokes	1	William H. Flynt
Surry	1	Joseph Hollingsworth
Tyrrell	1	Eli Spruill
Union	1	Cyrus Q. Lemmond
Wake	3	J.H. Alford
Wake	3	William Laws
Wake	3	Daniel Gould Fowle (Note: Daniel G. Fowle resigned his seat after being elected as Adjutant General of North Carolina. He was replaced by Calvin J. Rogers in the second special session.)
Wake	3	Calvin J. Rogers
Warren	2	L. Henderson
Warren	2	Thomas J. Judkins
Washington	1	James H. Smith (Note: James H. Smith did not take his seat until the first special session.)
Watauga	1	William Horton
Wayne	2	Marcus K. Crawford
Wayne	2	B.B. Rives
Wilkes	2	W.W. Hampton
Wilkes	2	E.M. Welborn
Yadkin	1	Andrew C. Cowles
Yancey	1	D.M. Young

=== Senate members ===
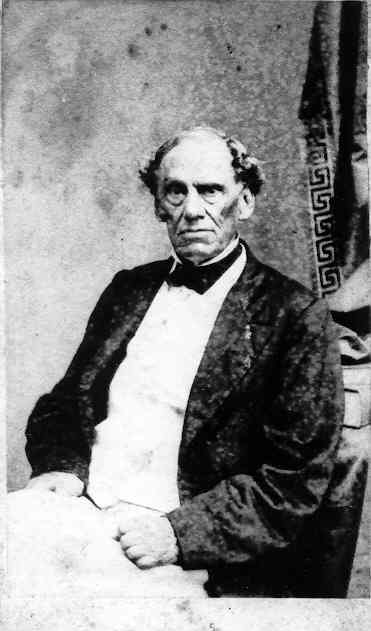
Sen. Bedford Brown, 37th District

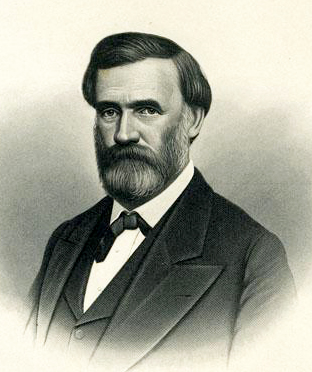
Speaker, Sen. Giles Mebane, 31st District

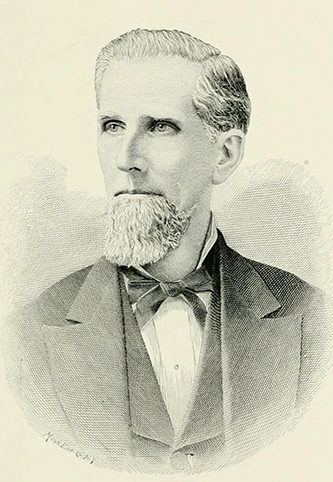
Sen. James Graham Ramsay, 41st District

The Senators elected a President, Clerk, Assistant Clerk, Doorkeeper, and Assistant Doorkeeper. The following Senators were elected by the voters of North Carolina to represent each county:

District	Counties	Senator	Home County
1	Pasquotank & Perquimans	William H. Bagley	Perquimans
2	Camden & Currituck	D. McD. Lindsay	Camden
3	Chowan & Gates	Mills H. Eure	Gates
4	Hyde & Tyrrell	Charles McCleese	Tyrrell
5	Northampton	W.S. Copeland	Northampton
6	Hertford	Joseph B. Slaughter	Hertford
7	Bertie	Thomas M. Garrett	Bertie
8	Martin & Washington	James G. Galloway	Washington
9	Halifax	M.L. Wiggins	Halifax
10	Edgecombe	Jesse H. Powell	Edgecombe
11	Pitt	Elias J. Blount	Pitt
12	Beaufort	Edward J. Warren	Beaufort
13	Craven	William B. Wadsworth	Craven
14	Carteret & Jones	M.F. Arendell	Carteret
15	Greene & Lenoir	Edward Patrick	Lenoir
16	New Hanover	Eli W. Hall	New Hanover
17	Duplin	James Dickson	Duplin
18	Onslow	A.J. Murrell	Onslow
19	Bladen, Brunswick, & Columbus	John W. Ellis	Columbus
20	Cumberland	W.B. Wright	Cumberland
21	Sampson	Thomas I. Faison	Sampson
22	Wayne	William K. Lane (Note: William K. Lane resigned and Benjamin Aycock took his place in the Extra Session in 1863.)	Wayne
22	Wayne	Benjamin Aycock	Wayne
23	Johnston	C.B. Sanders	Johnston
24	Wake	John P.H. Russ	Wake
25	Nash	A.G. Taylor	Nash
26	Franklin	Washington Harris	Franklin
27	Warren	E. D. Drake (Note: E. D. Drake died in office and was replaced by Thomas J. Pritchard in the extra session in 1863.)	Warren
27	Warren	Thomas J. Pritchard	Warren
28	Granville	R.W. Lassiter	Granville
29	Person	James Holeman	Person
30	Orange	William A. Graham	Orange
31	Alamance & Randolph	Giles Mebane	Alamance
32	Chatham	William P. Taylor	Chatham
33	Montgomery & Moore	Calvin W. Wooley	Montgomery
34	Richmond, & Robeson	Giles Leitch	Robeson
35	Anson & Union	William C. Smith	Anson
36	Guilford	Peter Adams	Guilford
37	Caswell	Bedford Brown	Caswell
38	Rockingham	Francis L. Simpson	Rockingham
39	Mecklenburg	John A. Young	Mecklenburg
40	Cabarrus & Stanly	J.W. Smith	Stanly
41	Davie & Rowan	James Graham Ramsay	Rowan
42	Davidson	H. Adams	Davidson
43	Forsyth & Stokes	James E. Matthews	Stokes
44	Ashe, Surry, Watauga, & Yadkin	Isaac Jarratt	Ashe
45	Alexander, Iredell, Wilkes	Leander Q. Sharpe	Iredell
46	Burke, Caldwell, & McDowell	Samuel J. Neal	Burke
47	Catawba, Gaston, & Lincoln	James White	Lincoln
48	Cleveland & Rutherford	M.O. Dickson	Rutherford
49	Buncombe, Henderson, Madison, & Yancey	William Marcus Shipp	Buncombe
50	Cherokee, Haywood, Jackson, & Macon	C.D. Smith	Macon

== Legislation ==
The Civil War was ongoing during the entire term of this assembly. The assembly passed public laws dealing with the following: the destroyed court house in Hertford County, funding of the state insane asylum (Dorothea Dix Hospital), establishing the eighth judicial district, prohibiting the distillation of spirituous liquors, modifying acts so that justices of the peace absent from counties under occupation of Union troops would not lose their position, acts dealing with the state militia, purchase and hiding of emergency provisions, authorization to the governor for the use of slave labor for building fortifications, provisions to survivors of soldiers dying in service, resolution to declare the separation of the United States and Confederate State final, creating a Roll of Honor maintained by the Governor of Confederate soldiers and patriots from North Carolina, a resolution condemning the confiscation of North Carolina government iron by the Confederate Government, extending the statute of limitations till the war is over, allowing the governor to draft all able bodied men between 18 and 45 years old into the militia, making monopolies, extortions, and speculation illegal during the war, and raising wartime taxes. The senate and house occasionally went into secret sessions, according to the minutes. This General Assembly created the Office of the North Carolina State Auditor, who was initially elected by the legislature every two years. Samuel F. Phillips was elected by this legislature as the first auditor. For details about legislation and minutes of this assembly, see Legislative Documents.

== See also ==
- List of North Carolina state legislatures
