= Harshaw Chapel and Cemetery =

Historic site in Cherokee County, North Carolina, US

- U.S. National Register of Historic Places
- U.S. Historic district
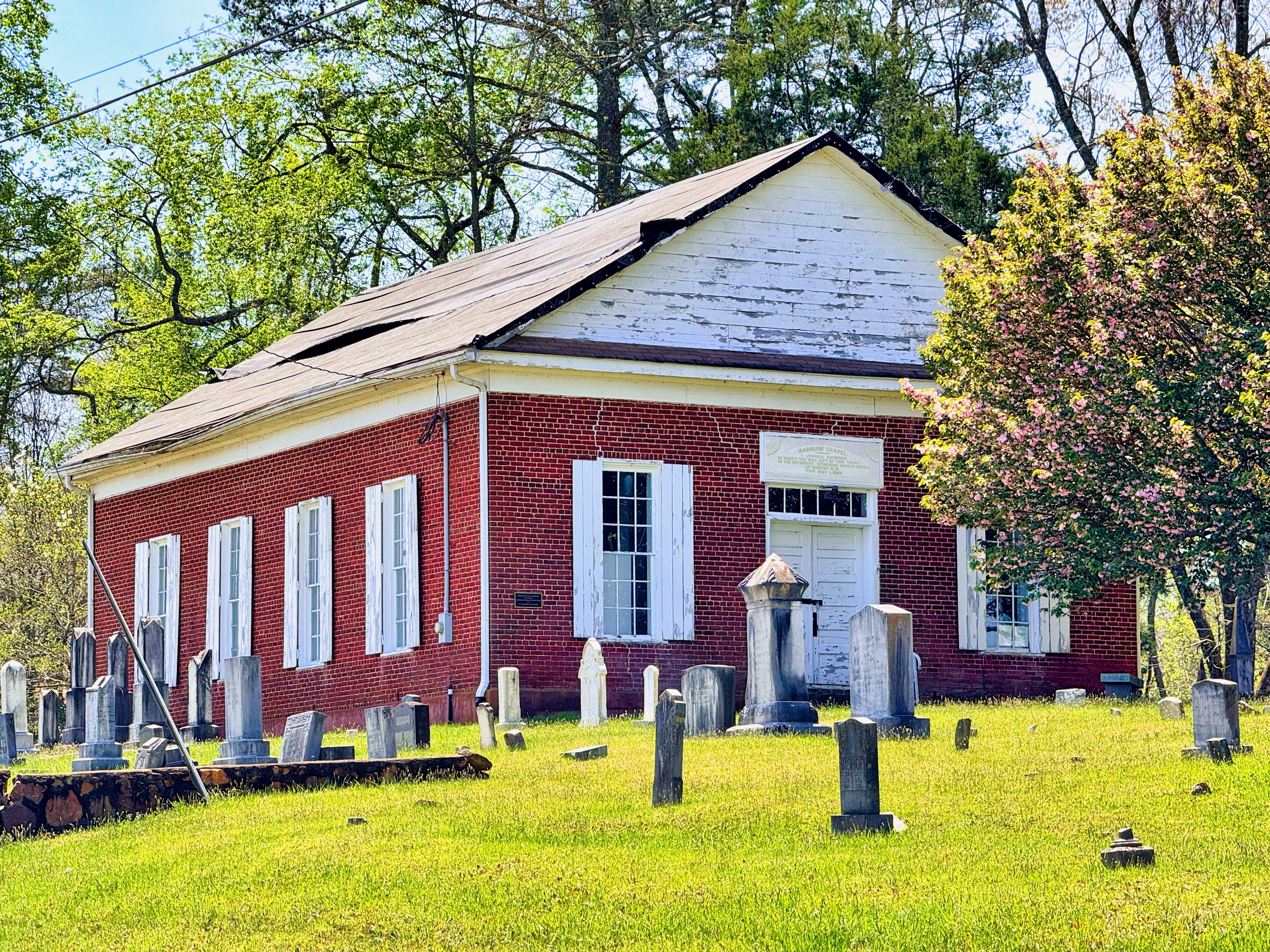
- Harshaw Chapel and Cemetery

- Location within North Carolina Location within the United States
- Location: Church and Central Sts., Murphy, North Carolina
- Coordinates: 35°5′6″N 84°2′1″W
- Area: 0.5 acres (0.20 ha)
- Built: 1869
- Architect: Cooper, James Warner
- Architectural style: Greek Revival
- NRHP reference No.: 84001979
- Added to NRHP: April 05, 1984

Harshaw Chapel and Cemetery is a historic Methodist chapel and cemetery at Church and Central Streets in Murphy, Cherokee County, North Carolina.

Harshaw Chapel is the oldest surviving structure in Murphy, the oldest church building in Cherokee County, and the only surviving example of mid-nineteenth century brick architecture in the entire county. It is thought to be the oldest existing structure in Cherokee County. It was renovated in 2025 and is again expected to hold worship services, cultural events, and music.

== History ==
Joshua Harshaw, a prominent early settler in the area and slaveholder, purchased the property during the sale of Native American land in 1838. The first person buried on the site was Nancy Elizabeth Crump Hayes, the first wife of North Carolina politician George Washington Hayes. She was buried in 1839. Other early prominent settlers are also buried in the cemetery.

The 6-acre cemetery was well-used before the church was constructed; early services are thought to have been held in a brush arbor. In 1844, Harshaw donated the cemetery to Methodist trustees to erect a church. A chapel was completed on the site on May 1, 1869. The chapel was built out of locally made brick in the vernacular Greek Revival style and has a pinewood floor. The Murphy Methodist Cemetery surrounds it.

In the early 20th century, electric lights were added to the building. In 1924, the Methodist congregation built a new two-story church, Murphy First United Methodist Church, in downtown Murphy. Harshaw Chapel was leased to Murphy's Free Methodist congregation during the 1940s until their own structure was finished. The chapel has received little use since. Around 1965, a new roof was added to it.

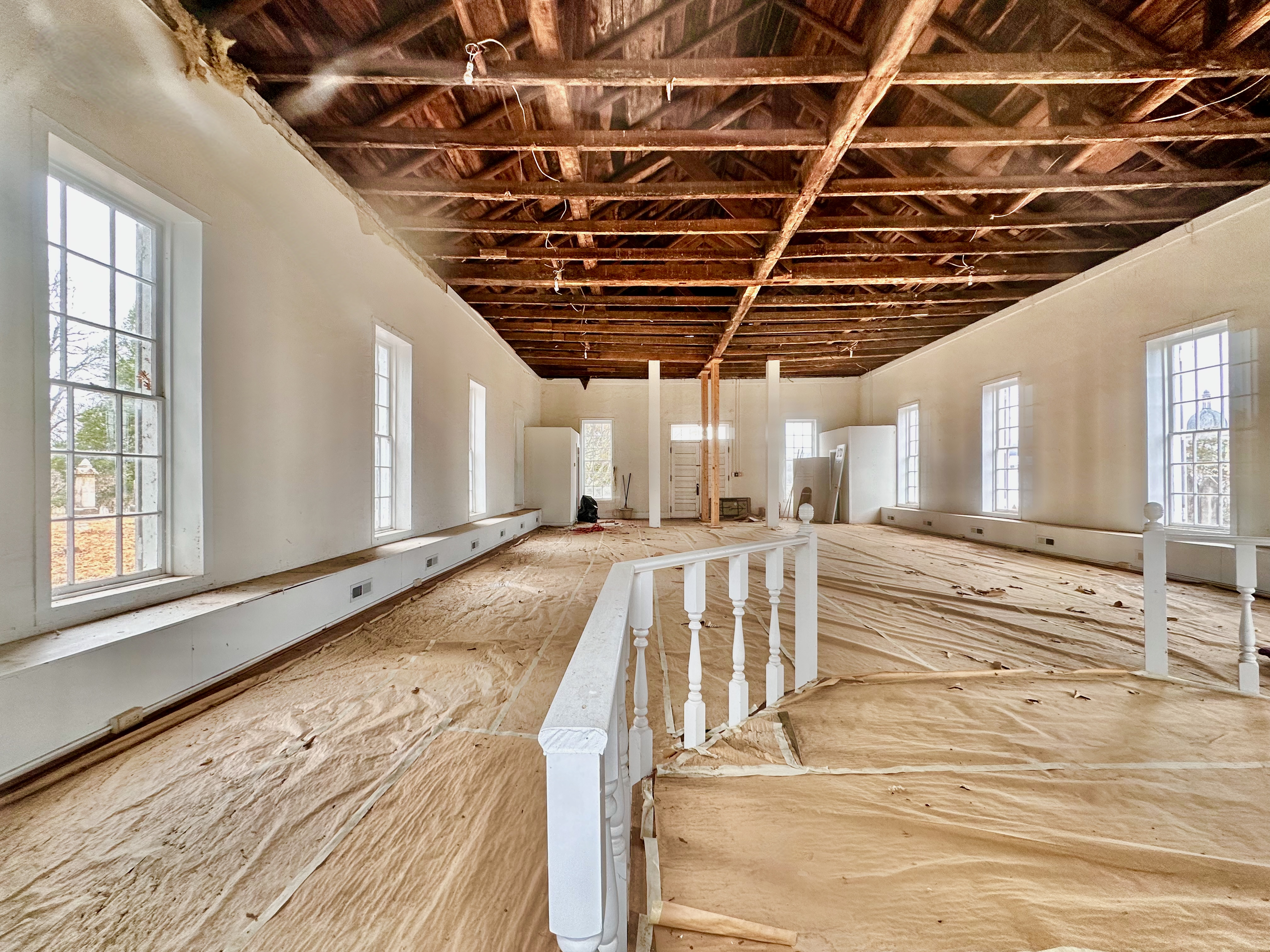
The interior of Harshaw Chapel in 2023

The property was listed on the National Register of Historic Places in 1984. By the start of the 21st century, the chapel was in disrepair. The roof was sagging, the steeple was leaning, and timbers in the attic and bell tower had rotted. There were fears the roof might collapse. In December 2019, the chapel's steeple was removed and roof covered until funds could be raised to make repairs. The steeple, bell, and other church furnishings were stored at an adjacent Cherokee Scout newspaper building for about five years. A $166,000 project to rebuild the church's roof and steeple, and reinstall the bell, took place in summer 2025. Renovation work was completed in November 2025 and the chapel officially reopened in May 2026.

== Notable burials ==
- Felix Axeley (1802–1858), Murphy's first lawyer, who entered the county before the Cherokee removal
- Felix Porter Axeley (1863–1908), North Carolina state legislator and Confederate Army captain
- Abram Enloe (1770–1840), rumored but unconfirmed biological father of Abraham Lincoln
- George Mercer Fain (1820–1893), first president of the Georgia and North Carolina Railroad
- Joshua Harshaw (1795–1855), prominent early settler for whom the chapel is named
- Nancy Elizabeth Crump Hayes (1809–1839), first wife of North Carolina politician George Washington Hayes
- Samuel Henry (1819–1899), established Murphy's first hotel
- Mary Turnbill (1823–1904), mother of the first pioneer child born in Murphy

== See also ==
- National Register of Historic Places listings in Cherokee County, North Carolina
