= 12th South Carolina Infantry Regiment =

Civil War military unit

- Flag of South Carolina
- Active: July 1, 1861, to April 9, 1865
- Country: Confederate States of America
- Allegiance: South Carolina
- Branch: Confederate States Army
- Type: Infantry
- Engagements: Port Royal; Gaines Mill; Frayser's Farm; Second Manassas; Ox Hill; Sharpsburg; Sheperdstown; Castleman's Ferry; Fredericksburg; Chancellorsville; Gettysburg; Williamsport; Bristoe Campaign; Mine Run Campaign; The Wilderness; Spotsylvania Courthouse; North Anna; Cold Harbour; Siege of Petersburg; Battle of Appomattox Court House

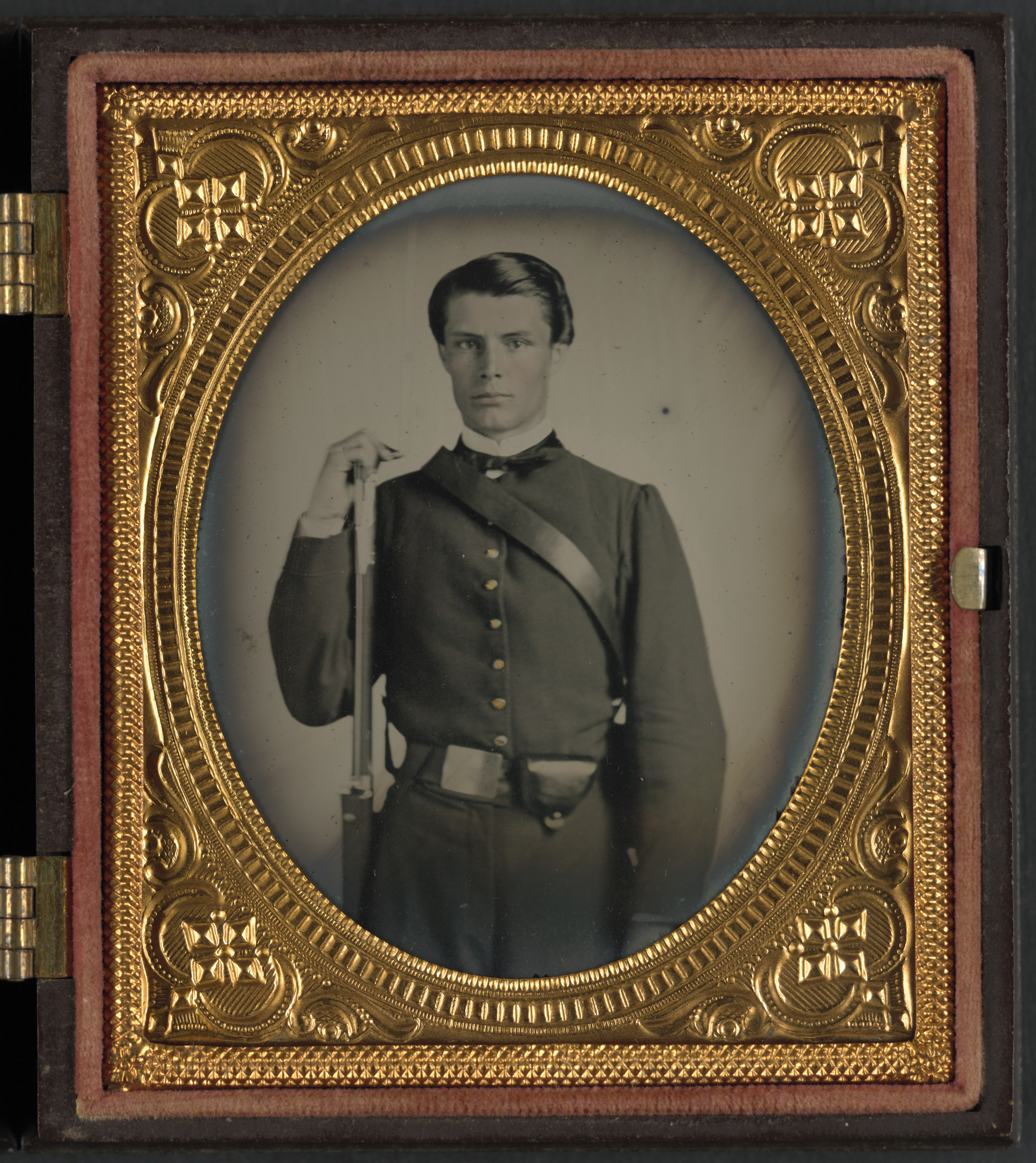
Private J.P. Robertson of Co. I, 12th South Carolina Infantry Regiment

The 12th South Carolina Infantry Regiment was an infantry regiment that served in the Confederate States Army during the American Civil War.

== Formation ==
In answer to the call of President of the Provisional Government of the Confederate States of America, Jefferson Davis, on or around the 1 July 1861, companies of volunteers from all over the Secessionist States began to bring themselves forward. The volunteers from South Carolina rendezvoused at Columbia, South Carolina, and were sent to a camp of instruction. This camp was located around five miles from Columbia, at Lightwoodknot Springs; there the men were allowed to elect their field officers. The first regiment to be formed was numbered as the 12th South Carolina Volunteers. The regiments' officers were, at its beginning:

Commanding Officer: Colonel R.G. Mills Dunovant

Second in Command: Lieutenant Colonel Dixon Barnes

Chief of Staff: Major Cadwallader Jones Jr.

== Companies ==
Company A (Bonham Rifles): York County

- Captain L.W. Grist
- Captain J.T. Parker
- Captain W.H. McCorkle

Company B (Campbell Rifles): York County

- Captain John Lucas Miller
- Captain W.S. Dunlop

Company C: Fairfield County

- Captain J.A. Hinnant
- Captain J.R. Thomas
- Captain H.C. Davis

Company D:

- Captain E.F. Bookter
- Captain J.H. Kinsler
- Captain J.C. Smith

Company E: Lancaster County

- Captain C.F. Hinson
- Captain T.F. Clyburn

Company F (Means Lights Infantry): Fairfield County

- Captain Hayne McMeekin
- Captain J.C. Bell

Company G: Pickens County

- Captain A.D. Gaillard
- Captain John M. McMoody

Company H: York County

- Captain Cadwallader Jones Jr.
- Captain G.E. McSteele
- Captain R.M. Kerr

Company I: Lancaster County

- Captain N.B. Vanlandingham
- Captain Dixon Barnes
- Captain William J. Stover

Company K: Pickens County

- Captain J.C. Nevill

== See also ==
- List of South Carolina Confederate Civil War units
