= Thomas L. Clingman =

American politician and officer (1812 – 1897)

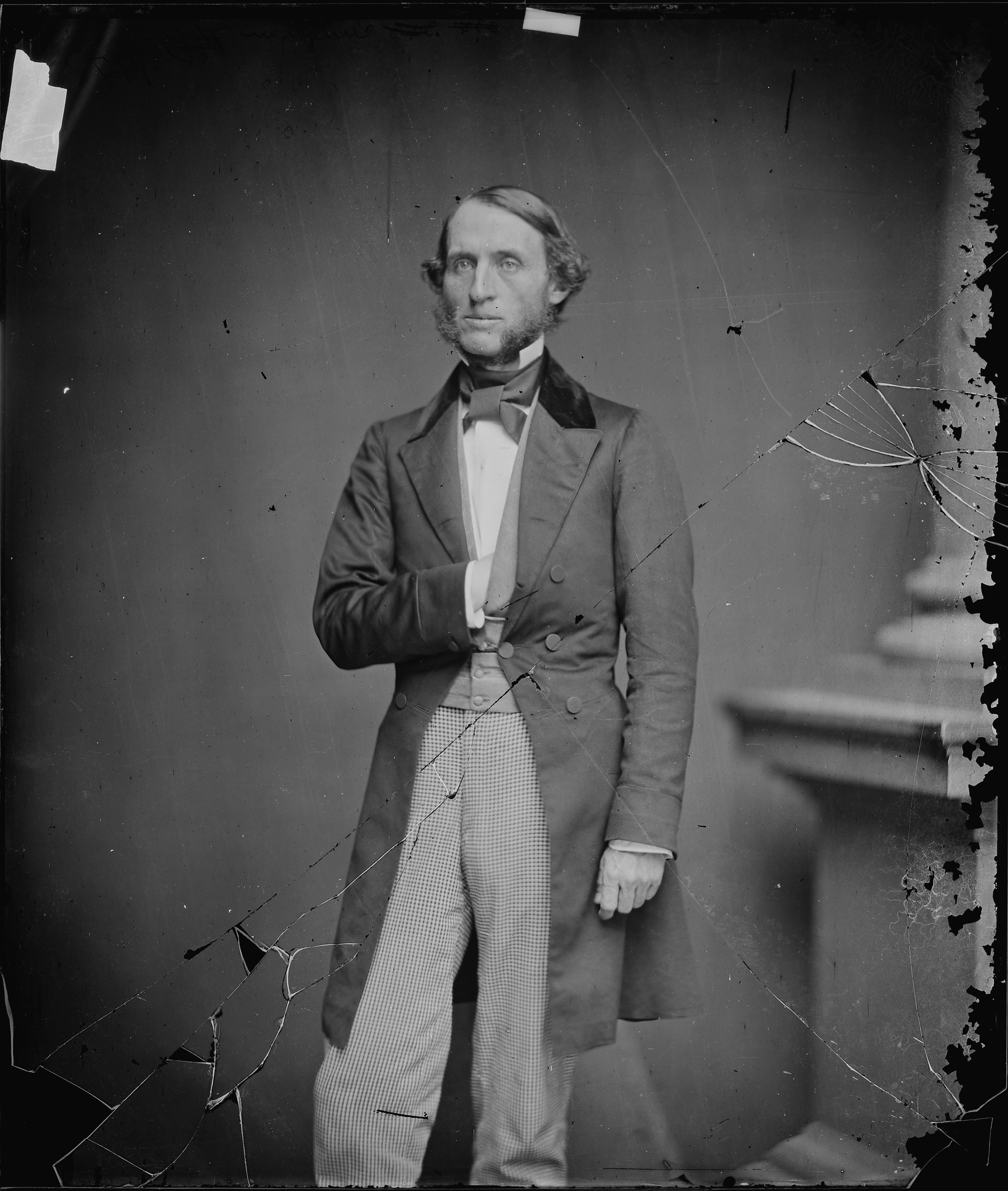
- Clingman photographed by Mathew Brady, c. 1860-65

United States Senator from North Carolina
- In office May 7, 1858 – March 11, 1861
- Preceded by: Asa Biggs
- Succeeded by: John Pool (1868)

Member of the U.S. House of Representatives from North Carolina
- In office March 4, 1853 – May 7, 1858
- Preceded by: Edward Stanly
- Succeeded by: Zebulon Vance
- Constituency: 8th district
- In office March 4, 1847 – March 3, 1853
- Preceded by: James Graham
- Succeeded by: Henry Shaw
- Constituency: 1st district
- In office March 4, 1843 – March 3, 1845
- Preceded by: Kenneth Rayner
- Succeeded by: James Graham
- Constituency: 1st district

Personal details
- Born: Thomas Lanier Clingham; July 27, 1812 Huntsville, North Carolina, U.S.
- Died: October 3, 1897 (aged 85) Morganton, North Carolina, U.S.
- Resting place: Riverside Cemetery
- Party: Democratic
- Education: University of North Carolina, Chapel Hill (BA)

Military service
- Allegiance: Confederate States
- Branch/service: Confederate States Army (Infantry)
- Years of service: 1861–1865
- Rank: Brigadier General
- Battles/wars: See list: American Civil War; Peninsula Campaign; Battle of Goldsborough Bridge; Battery Wagner; Drewry's Bluff; Battle of Cold Harbor; Siege of Petersburg; Battle of Globe Tavern; Fort Fisher; Battle of Bentonville

Thomas Lanier Clingman (July 27, 1812 – November 3, 1897), known as the "Prince of Politicians," was an American politician who was a Democratic member of the United States House of Representatives from 1843 to 1845 and from 1847 to 1858, and U.S. senator from the state of North Carolina between 1858 and 1861. During the Civil War, he refused to resign his Senate seat and was one of the many southern senators subsequently expelled from the Senate in absentia. He then served as a general in the Confederate States Army.

== Early life ==
Clingman, was born in Huntsville, a small community in present-day Yadkin County, North Carolina. His parents were Jacob and Jane Poindexter Clingman and he was named for Dr. Thomas Lanier, his half uncle. He was educated by private tutors and in the public schools in Iredell County, NC. Clingman graduated from the University of North Carolina in 1832, where he was a member of the Dialectic Senate of the Dialectic and Philanthropic Societies. He then studied law and was admitted to the bar in 1834 and began practice in Huntsville.

== Political career ==
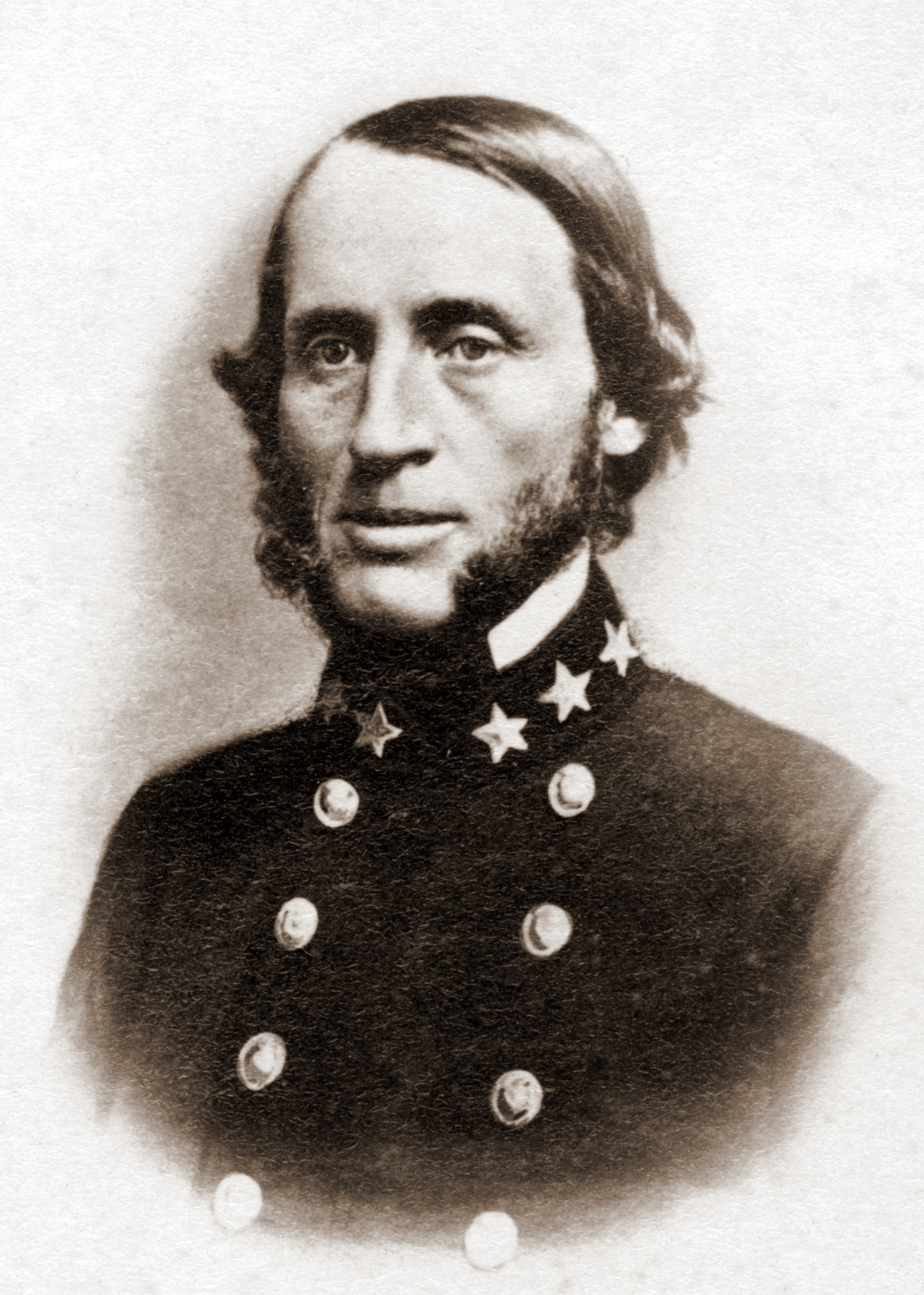
Clingman in uniform.

Clingman was elected to the North Carolina State House of Commons in 1835. In 1836 he moved to Asheville, North Carolina. He was a member of the North Carolina State Senate in 1840. In 1843 Clingman ran as a Whig and was elected to the 28th United States Congress, however he was defeated in his reelection bid in 1845. In 1845 he fought a duel with a fellow congressman William Lowndes Yancey of Alabama. In Yancey's maiden speech on the House floor, he had impugned his opponent's integrity. Both duelists had missed. In 1847 he regained the seat and won reelection in 1849, 1851, 1853, 1855 and 1857. On May 7, 1858, he resigned after becoming a United States senator as a Democrat the previous day, replacing the resigning Asa Biggs. He was reelected but was expelled from the Senate for support of the Confederacy.

== Civil War ==
When he first entered the War, Clingman was the commander of the 25th North Carolina Infantry and took part in the Peninsula Campaign. He later commanded a brigade of infantry. Clingman's Brigade consisted of the 8th, 31st, 51st and 61st North Carolina Infantry. Clingman's Brigade fought at Goldsborough, Battery Wagner, Drewry's Bluff, Cold Harbor, Petersburg, Globe Tavern, Fort Fisher, and Bentonville.

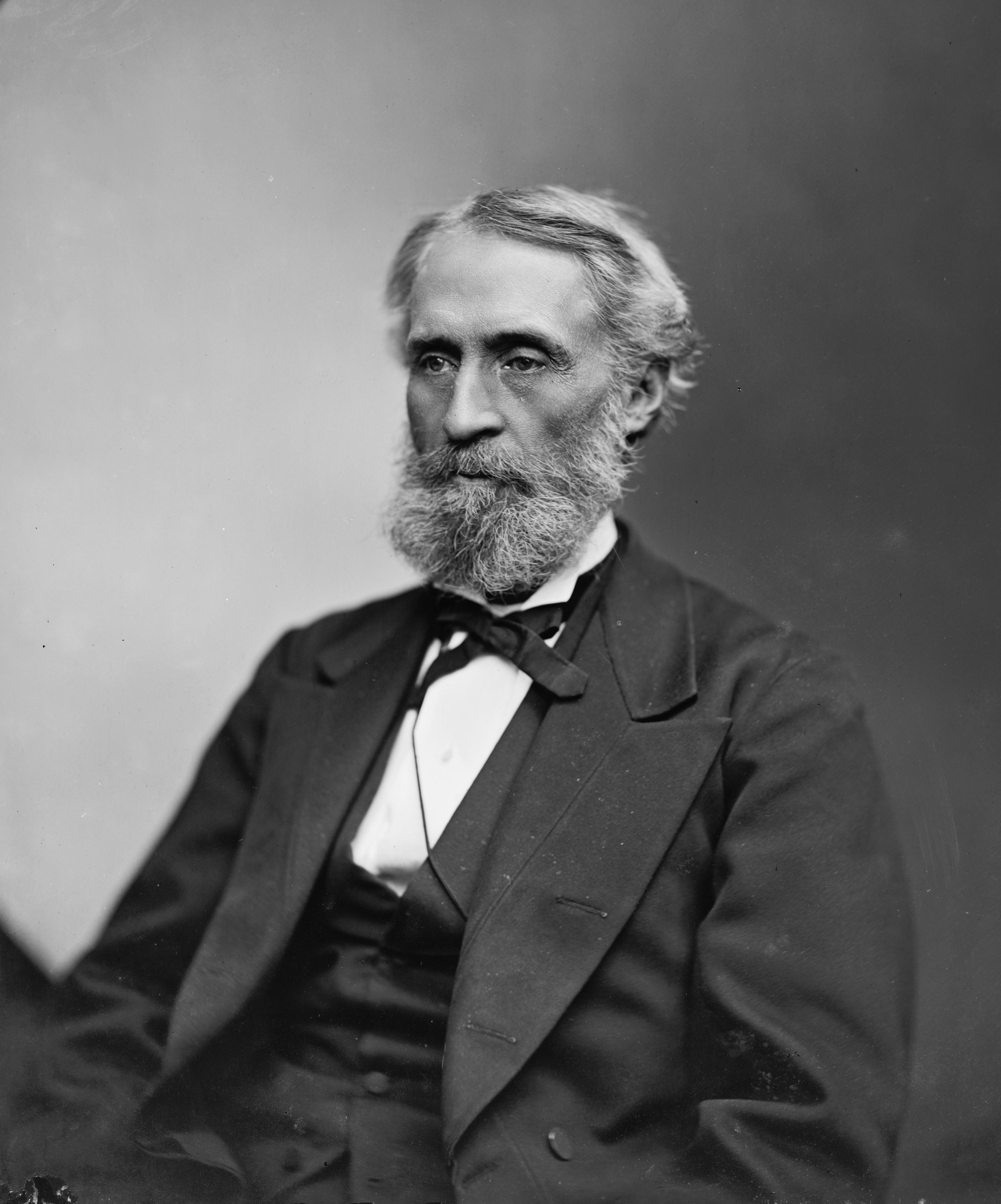
Clingman in his later years

== Personal life ==
Prior to the Civil War, Clingman explored and measured mountains in western North Carolina and eastern Tennessee. Kuwohi, Tennessee's highest mountain, shared with North Carolina, was renamed Clingman's Dome in his honor in 1859 as Kuwohi was one of the mountain elevations he had accurately measured using triangulation and barometers, being the first person to do so with the mountain top, all the while never stepping foot on the mountain. The mountain's name was changed back to Kuwohi in 2024. Clingman had explored, measured, and surveyed other mountains in the general Great Smoky Mountains area as well as other surrounding southern Appalachian mountains. He died in Morganton, North Carolina, and was buried in the Riverside Cemetery in Asheville, North Carolina.

== See also ==
- List of American Civil War generals (Confederate)
- List of United States senators expelled or censured

U.S. House of Representatives
Preceded by Kenneth Rayner	Member of the U.S. House of Representatives from North Carolina's 1st congressional district 1843–1845	Succeeded by James Graham
Preceded by James Graham	Member of the U.S. House of Representatives from North Carolina's 9th congressional district 1847–1853	Succeeded by Henry Shaw
Preceded by Edward Stanly	Member of the U.S. House of Representatives from North Carolina's 8th congressional district 1853–1858	Succeeded by Zebulon B. Vance
Preceded by Alexander C. M. Pennington	Chair of the House Foreign Affairs Committee; 1857–1858	Succeeded by George Washington Hopkins
U.S. Senate
Preceded by Asa Biggs	U.S. Senator (Class 3) from North Carolina; 1858–1861; Served alongside: David Reid, Thomas Bragg	Vacant Title next held by John Pool; 1868
