= Mount Hermon, Alamance County, North Carolina =

Mount Hermon
- Unincorporated community
- Location within the state of North Carolina
- Coordinates: 35°59′2″N 79°24′46″W
- Country: United States
- State: North Carolina
- County: Alamance
- Time zone: UTC-5 (Eastern (EST))
  - Summer (DST): UTC-4 (EDT)

Mount Hermon is an unincorporated community in Alamance County, North Carolina, United States. The community is centered between North Carolina Highway 87, and North Carolina Highway 49, in south-central Alamance County.

== Notable people ==
- John Stockard (died 1861), North Carolina state politician
