= George W. Hayes (North Carolina) =

American politician

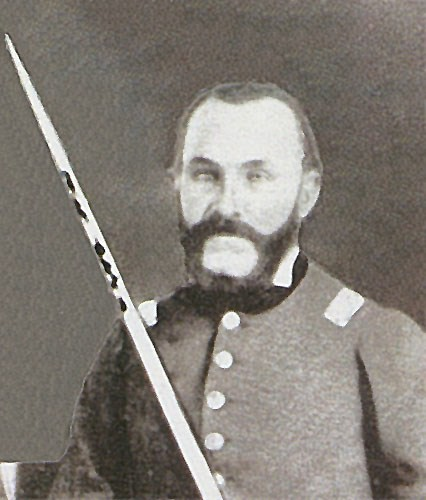
Captain George Washington Hayes of North Carolina

Captain George Washington Hayes (May 5, 1804 – October 26, 1864) was a 19th-century North Carolina politician. The town of Hayesville, North Carolina, is named for him.

== Early life ==
Hayes was born in Georgia and left an orphan as a young boy. He spent much of his childhood among Cherokee people in Haywood County and the Oconaluftee River valley where he learned their language at an early age. In 1832 he married Nancy Elizabeth Crump and had two children with her. Hayes moved to a home along the Hiwassee River in Cherokee County by 1838. During the Cherokee removal known as the Trail of Tears, Hayes served as an interpreter. As a result of his service, he was given 700 acres on the Valley River in Tomotla in 1839. Hayes was an active participant in abetting Cherokee resistance to deportation and aiding plans to enable some Cherokee communities to remain. Hayes' wife died in 1839. She was the first person to be buried in Hawshaw Chapel Cemetery in Murphy.

== Political career ==
While campaigning in 1840, Hayes met Elizabeth Hamilton Stewart in Valleytown, North Carolina, and they were married at Fort Defiance in Caldwell County on February 6, 1842. Hayes had ten children with her.

Hayes was first elected as a member of the North Carolina General Assembly in 1843 and served there through 1852. While in office he sponsored a bill to award citizenship and 337 acres in present-day Graham County to Cherokee leader Junaluska. Hayes also introduced the bill that brought the first public highways into western North Carolina. In 1855 Hayes built a log home in Tomotla. The home reportedly still stands today. He also had a store and mill on site. When Tomotla gained a post office in the late 1850s, Hayes was appointed the first postmaster.

While running for Cherokee County representative in the fall 1860 election, Hayes discovered that residents in southeast Cherokee County wanted to form their own county due to the difficulty of traveling to the distant county seat of Murphy. Hayes promised to introduce legislation to form a new county and won a seat in the North Carolina General Assembly of 1860–1861. In February 1861 legislation to organize a new county was introduced and passed. Clay County was named in honor of Kentucky statesman Henry Clay. The county seat was named Hayesville, for Hayes.

Hayes voted for North Carolina's secession from the union in 1861 and then enlisted in Confederate forces as captain of the 2nd North Carolina Cavalry regiment. In 1864, after poor performance at the Battle of New Bern, Hayes returned to Cherokee County on furlough. While there, he saw the need to attend a session of the general assembly in Raleigh to fight for protections of women and children. While spending the night with a friend in Franklin along the route, he fell seriously ill and died a few days later. In 1886, two years after her husband's death, Elizabeth donated the land on which Tomotla United Methodist Church was later built. One of Hayes’ sons, George W. Hayes Jr., also served a term in the N.C. legislature from Swain County. Another son, Jefferson T. Hayes, took over his father's duties as postmaster and became the second-longest serving postmaster in the United States.
