= Tomotla, North Carolina =

Unincorporated community in North Carolina, US

Coordinates: 35°08′05″N 83°59′04″W

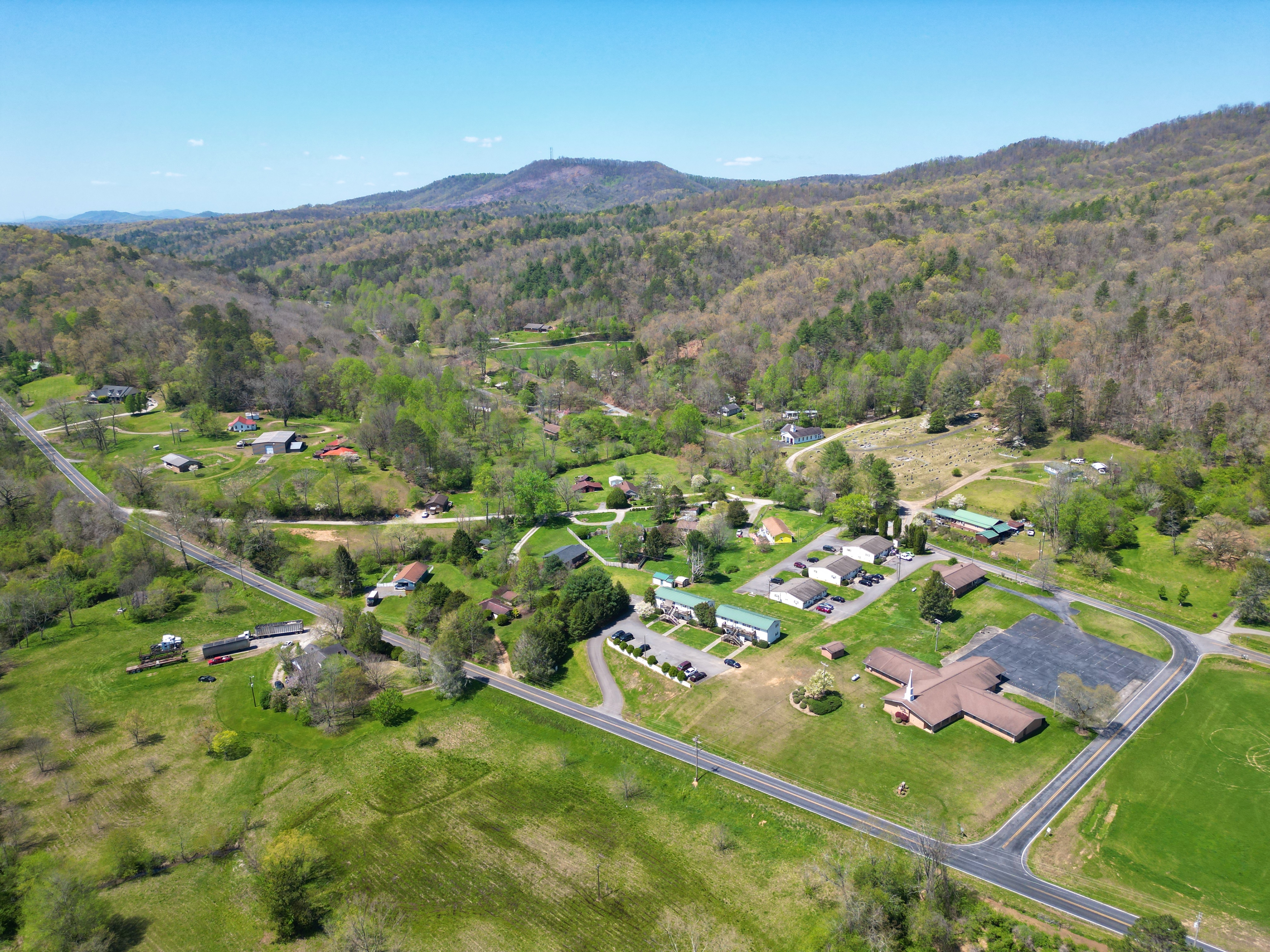
Tomotla in 2024

Tomotla is an unincorporated community along the Valley River in Cherokee County, in the U.S. state of North Carolina.

== History ==
A post office called Tomotla was established in 1848, and remained in operation until 1948. The name "Tomotla" is derived from the Yamasee Native Americans. The meaning of the name is unknown. The name variant "Tomotley" was also used for more than one historic Cherokee town.

== Notable people ==
- George Washington Hayes (1804–1864) – North Carolina politician who established Clay County and served as Tomotla's first postmaster
