= John Lucas Miller =

American politician (1831–1864)

John Lucas Miller, Jr. (1831 in Ebenezer, South Carolina – May 6, 1864) was an attorney and state legislator in South Carolina who served as a colonel in the Confederate States Army. He was killed at the Battle of the Wilderness during the American Civil War.

== Family ==
Miller's father, John Lucas Miller (1795–1838) and his uncle Stephen Decatur Miller both served as delegates to the Nullification Convention during the South Carolina Nullification Crisis of 1832–1833. His uncle also served as governor of South Carolina and United States Senator from South Carolina. Stephen Decatur Miller's daughter, and thus John Lucas Miller, Jr.'s cousin, was the noted Civil War diarist Mary Boykin Miller Chesnut.

== Legislator and lawyer ==
Miller served in the South Carolina House of Representatives in 1853, when he was 22 years old.

Miller was a native of York County, South Carolina and worked as an attorney in Yorkville, the county seat, for several years before the war.

== Civil War ==
Miller volunteered for military service for the Confederate States of America at the beginning of the Civil War, and organized a volunteer infantry company. Initially serving as a captain in the Army of Northern Virginia, he commanded a unit of skirmishers on September 17, 1862, during the Battle of Antietam (called the Battle of Sharpsburg in the south), assigned to locate Union Army positions.

After the Battle of Fredericksburg, he was promoted to colonel, and assigned to command the 12th South Carolina Infantry after the previous commander resigned. This unit was part of Colonel Abner Monroe Perrin's First Brigade of a division commanded by General William Dorsey Pender. Miller first led this unit at the Battle of Chancellorsville, and in the aftermath of this significant Confederate victory, was assigned to March 2000 Union prisoners to Richmond, Virginia. He completed this assignment without a single prisoner escaping.

General Pender was killed during the Battle of Gettysburg in July, 1863. Although his regiment had 20 men killed at Gettysburg, Miller survived the defeat and helped organize the Confederate retreat. In the days that followed, the 12th Regiment lost another 18 men killed in the Battles of Hagerstown and Falling Water during the retreat from Gettysburg.

Miller was killed at the Battle of the Wilderness along with 15 other men of his regiment. He was wounded by a minie ball in the bowels on May 5, 1864, and died in a field hospital before the following morning. It was said that he "commanded the respect of officers and men by his courage and conscientiousness, and acquired many friends by his affable and courteous deportment".
