= Herbert Sims =

English cricketer

Herbert Marsh Sims (15 March 1853 – 5 October 1885) was an English amateur first-class cricketer, who played eighteen matches for Cambridge University from 1873 to 1875, and five games for Yorkshire County Cricket Club from 1875 to 1877.

Born in Mount Tavy, Tavistock, Devon, Sims was educated at St Peter's School, York, and Jesus College, Cambridge. At cricket he was a right-arm fast bowler. He took 65 wickets at 19.42, with a best of 6 for 76 against the Gentlemen of England. He took five wickets in an innings three times in all, the other occasions being against Surrey and the Marylebone Cricket Club (MCC). All his bowling was for Cambridge University. He scored 484 runs at 15.12, with a highest score of 71 for Cambridge University against Surrey. He took eighteen catches in the field.

After graduating from Cambridge, Sims became a Church of England priest and was curate at St Peter's Church, Hunslet (a suburb of Leeds, Yorkshire) 1878–84. He was then appointed curate at St Cuthbert's, Hunslet, but died in October 1885 in Whitby, Yorkshire, aged 32.
