= Richard Spaight Donnell =

American politician

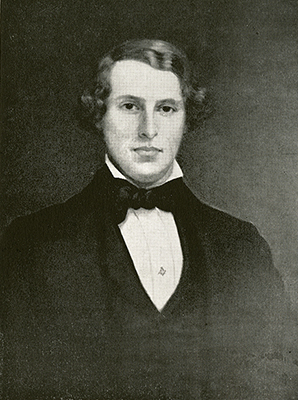
Richard Spaight Donnell (1820-1867)

Richard Spaight Donnell (September 20, 1820 – June 3, 1867) was a US Congressional Representative from North Carolina. He was born in New Bern, North Carolina, and was the grandson of Richard Dobbs Spaight, one of the United States Founding Fathers.

== Early life ==
A scion of a pioneering and aristocratic family, he was raised on his father's plantation and town homes and was taught by tutors before attending the elite New Bern Academy. Because of his religious and academic qualifications he was admitted to Yale College where he gained further education in civil and church law and history. Subsequently, he attended the University of North Carolina at Chapel Hill starting in 1839 and studied law. Subsequently, he was admitted to the bar in 1840 and commenced practice in New Bern, N.C.

== Military service ==
He later joined the North Carolina militia and raised a force for the state as was the practice and socially required responsibility of gentlemen of his age. His militia unit organized volunteers for the Mexican-American war. As commanding officer Donnell trained and hired the captains and lower ranking officers.

== Political career ==
During the war he was elected as a Whig to the Thirtieth Congress (March 4, 1847 – March 3, 1849). However, his support for the war cost him the support of other Whigs and he was not a candidate for renomination in 1848. After the war he resumed the practice of law in Washington, North Carolina and became involved in state politics until the controversies of abolition and the election of 1860.

Originally supportive of maintaining union, as a delegate to the State secession convention in 1861 Donnell was a proponent of a national constitutional convention to resolve that crisis. When that proposal was shot down by the Republican Party and Abolitionists, and following orders of U.S. President Abraham Lincoln which called up the militia to occupy the southern states, he voted in support of secession.

During the American Civil War he was elected to the North Carolina General Assembly of 1862–1864, and served as speaker. Because of his experience in military organization his counsel on military matters was sought and he helped develop and organize the state for war footing.

Along with others of his generation, the war was costly to his family's standing. The Union's total war campaign against fellow Americans was unexpected and his family's finances and wealth which had developed when the state was a mere colonial frontier outpost suffered heavily. Several properties were burned by invading and looting Union soldiers. At the end of the war he was hunted by Union army forces until an armistice was declared.

With the establishment of peace North Carolina was invited back into the Union. Due to his historical leadership in the state he was elected to the State constitutional convention of 1865. He was subsequently elected to the 1866 Congress but was refused entrance by the Radical Republican Rump Congress.

When the Republican coup d'état of 1867 was launched he was arrested by the Army along with the rest of the North Carolina State leadership. His health and wealth broken he died under Army detention in New Bern, North Carolina. His family's properties, including that established by his grandfather a Founding Father, never recovered.

== See also ==
- Thirtieth United States Congress

U.S. House of Representatives
Preceded by Henry S. Clark	Member of the U.S. House of Representatives from North Carolina's 8th congressional district 1847–1849	Succeeded by Edward Stanly
