= James Graham (North Carolina politician) =

American politician

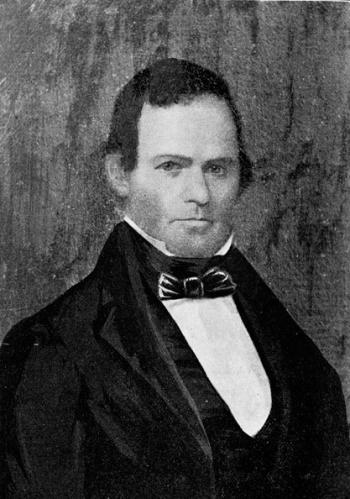
James Graham.

James Graham (January 7, 1793 – September 25, 1851) was a North Carolina attorney and politician. He served as congressional representative from that state.

== Personal life ==
He was the older brother of North Carolinian senator William Alexander Graham. James Graham graduated from the University of North Carolina at Chapel Hill in 1814 in classical studies. Graham studied law and was admitted to the bar in 1818 and commenced practice in Rutherford County, North Carolina.

== Career ==
He was a member of the State House of Representatives in 1822, 1823, 1824, 1828, and 1829.

Graham was then elected as a National Republican to the twenty-third Congress (March 4, 1833 – March 3, 1835). Graham served from March 4, 1835, to March 29, 1836. He was subsequently elected as a National Republican to the same Congress, re-elected as a Whig to the Twenty-fifth, Twenty-sixth, and Twenty-seventh Congresses serving from December 5, 1836, to March 3, 1843. He was the chairman of the Committee on Public Expenditures (Twenty-seventh Congress).

He was an unsuccessful candidate for reelection in 1842 to the Twenty-eighth Congress; elected as a Whig to the Twenty-ninth Congress (March 4, 1845 – March 3, 1847) but did not run again in 1846.

After his political career, Graham farmed near Rutherfordton, North Carolina, where he died September 25, 1851.

== See also ==
- Twenty-third United States Congress
- Twenty-fourth United States Congress
- Twenty-fifth United States Congress
- Twenty-sixth United States Congress
- Twenty-seventh United States Congress
- Twenty-ninth United States Congress

U.S. House of Representatives
| Preceded by Samuel P. Carson | Member of the U.S. House of Representatives from North Carolina's 12th congressional district 1833–1843 | Succeeded by District inactive |
| Preceded by Thomas L. Clingman | Member of the U.S. House of Representatives from North Carolina's 1st congressional district 1845-1847 | Succeeded by Thomas L. Clingman |
