= Giles Mebane =

American politician

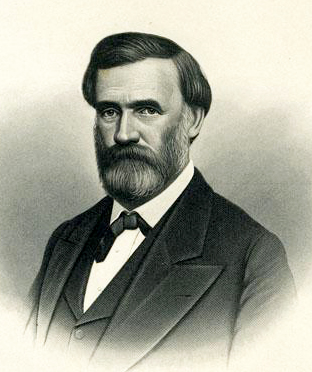
Senator Giles Mebane

Giles Mebane (1809–1899) was a North Carolina politician who served in the North Carolina General Assembly as Speaker of the North Carolina Senate during most of the American Civil War (1862–1865).

== Biography ==
He was the grandson of Congressman Alexander Mebane and the son of Speaker of the North Carolina House of Representatives James Mebane.

Mebane married Mary Yancey, the daughter of Bartlett Yancey, in 1837. He represented Orange County (later Alamance County after the latter county was formed in 1849) in the North Carolina House of Commons from 1844 through 1850 as a member of the Whig Party. He returned to the House in 1854 and 1858 before being elected to the Senate in 1861. At the end of the war he moved to Caswell County, where he was also later elected to the state Senate.

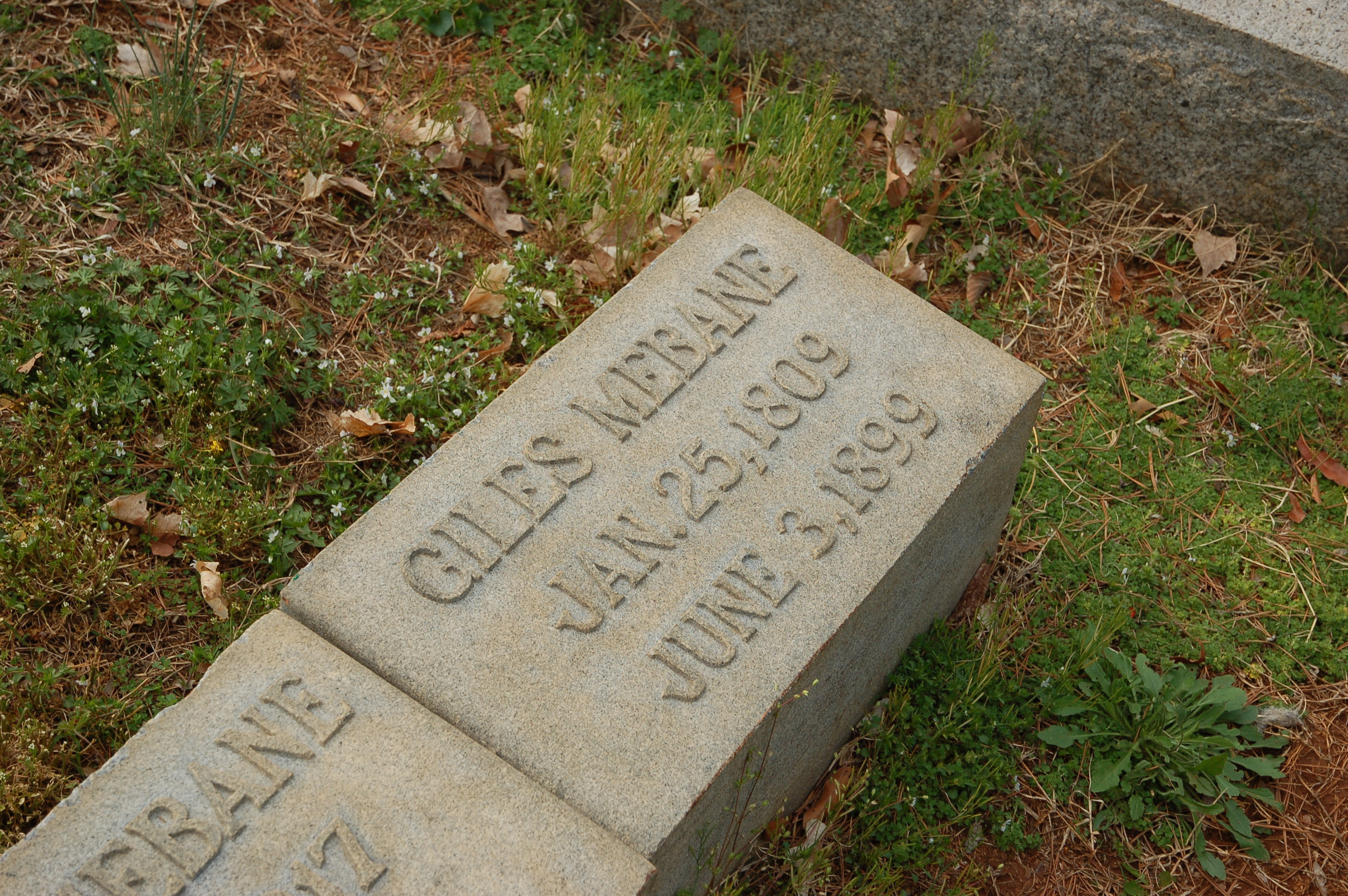
Tombstone of Giles Mebane, located in Linwood Cemetery in Graham, North Carolina.

Political offices
| Preceded by Henry Toole Clark | Speaker of the North Carolina Senate; 1862–1865 | Succeeded by Thomas Settle |
