= John Alston Barringer =

Mayor of Greensboro (1851–1931)

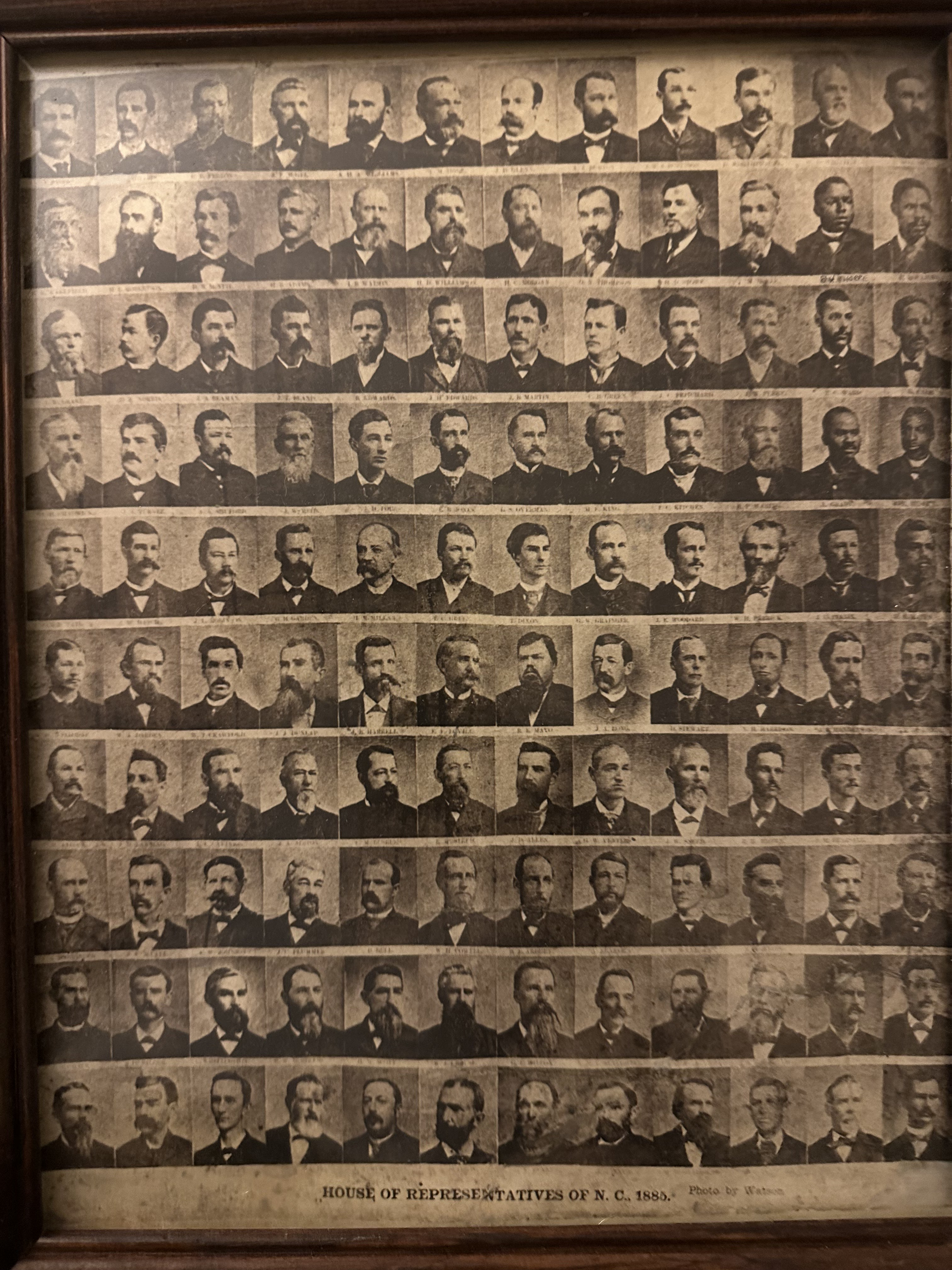
Members of the North Carolina House of Representatives in 1885

John Alston Barringer (August 30, 1851 – March 26, 1931) was a lawyer, state legislator and mayor in North Carolina. He served two terms as Mayor of Greensboro, North Carolina. He served in the North Carolina House of Representatives in 1885. He served in the North Carolina Senate in 1909.

He was born in 1851 on the Alston homestead, near Pittsboro, in Chatham County, North Carolina, the son of a Methodist minister. He graduated from Trinity College, now Duke University, in 1872, and attended Richmond Mumford Pearson's Pearson Law School. He married Martha Moderwell Sloan and they had a daughter.

Hr died on March 26, 1931, at St. Leo's Hospital, Greensboro, after a long illness.
