= John Gaston Grant =

American politician (1858–1923)

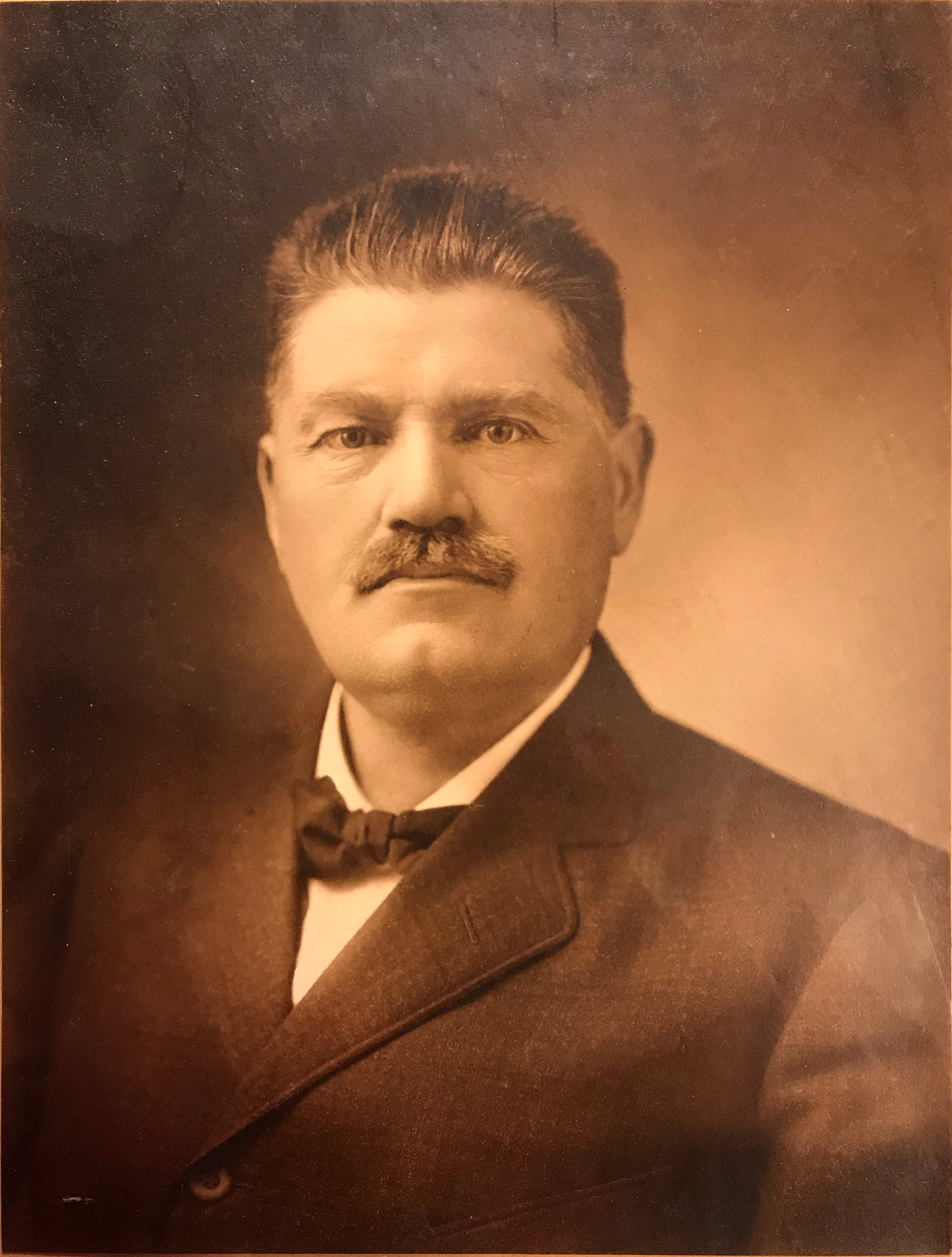
- Official portrait of John Gaston Grant while serving in U.S. Congress

Member of the U.S. House of Representatives from North Carolina's 10th district
- In office March 4, 1909 – March 3, 1911
- Preceded by: William T. Crawford
- Succeeded by: James M. Gudger, Jr.

Personal details
- Born: January 1, 1858 Edneyville, North Carolina, U.S.
- Died: June 21, 1923 (aged 65) Hendersonville, North Carolina, U.S.
- Party: Republican
- Spouse: Zsa Zura Edney (m. 1876)

John Gaston Grant (January 1, 1858 – June 21, 1923) was an American politician who served in the U.S. House of Representatives.

John Gaston Grant was born January 1, 1858, in a log cabin in Edneyville Township, Henderson County, North Carolina. He was the fifth child of William Colin and Sarah Elizabeth (Freeman) Grant, of Henderson County, North Carolina. He was self-educated and a lifelong "Radical" or Republican. He was called "Cornbread John" by local Democratic-leaning newspaper, The French Broad Hustler. He married Zsa Zura Edney on March 30, 1876, in Henderson County, North Carolina.

Grant was a Member of the North Carolina House of Representatives in 1889, but declined a renomination. He was the sheriff of Henderson County 1892–1896 and refused a renomination in 1896. He was elected as a Republican to the Sixty-first Congress (March 4, 1909 – March 3, 1911). He was an unsuccessful candidate for reelection in 1910 to the Sixty-second Congress after which he resumed agricultural pursuits.

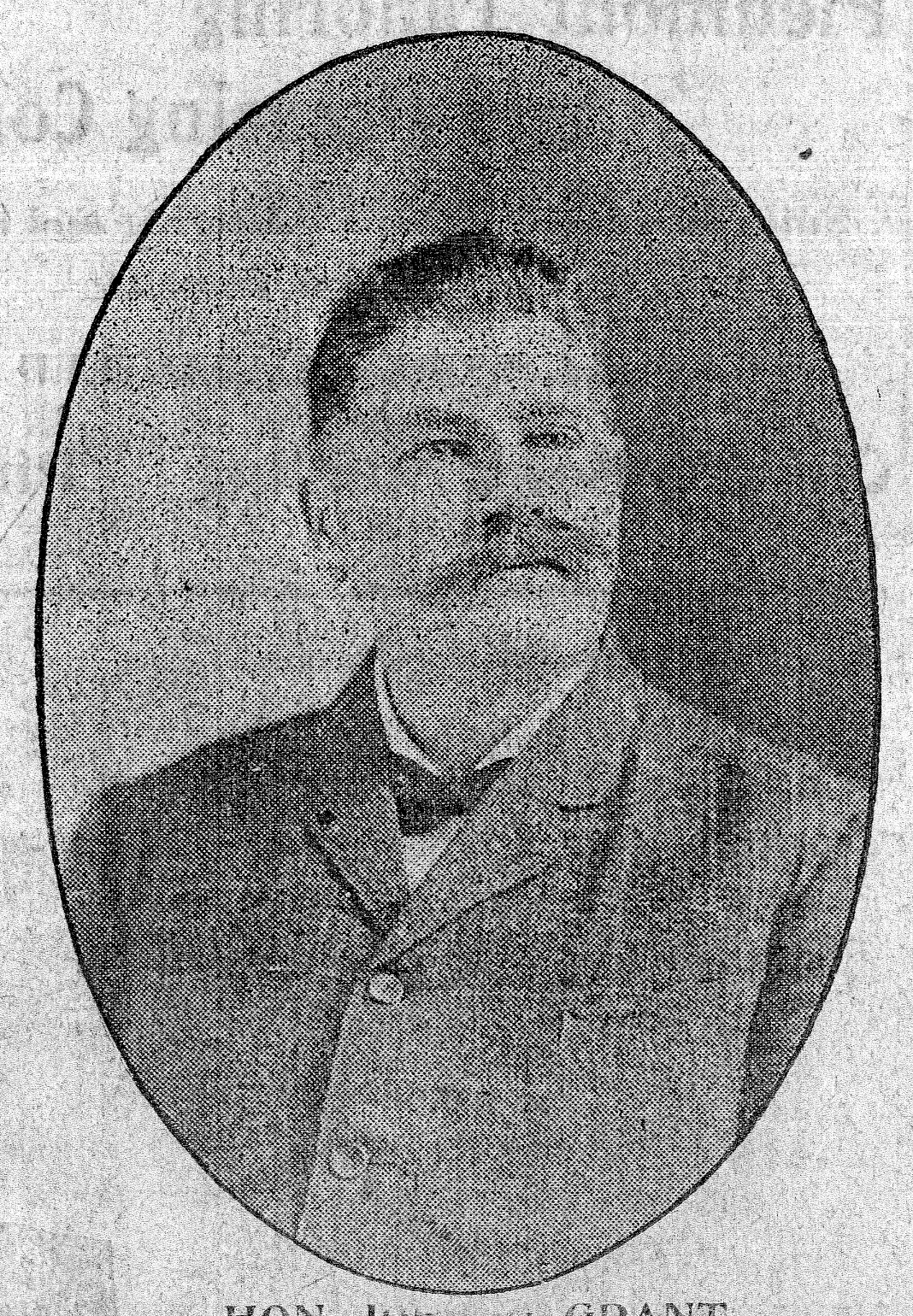
John Gaston Grant, c. 1908

Grant died in Hendersonville, North Carolina, on June 21, 1923.

U.S. House of Representatives
Preceded by William T. Crawford	Member of the U.S. House of Representatives from North Carolina's 10th congressional district 1909–1911	Succeeded by James M. Gudger, Jr.
