= William A. Hoke =

American politician (1851–1925)

Chief Justice of the North Carolina Supreme Court
- In office 1924 – March 1925
- Preceded by: Walter Clark
- Succeeded by: Walter P. Stacy

Associate Justice of the North Carolina Supreme Court
- In office 1905–1924

Member of the North Carolina House of Representatives
- In office 1889–1890

Personal details
- Born: William Alexander Hoke; October 25, 1851 Lincolnton, North Carolina, U.S.
- Died: September 13, 1925 (aged 73) Raleigh, North Carolina, U.S.
- Resting place: St. Luke's Episcopal Church Cemetery, Lincolnton, North Carolina, U.S.
- Party: Democratic
- Spouse: Mary McBee (m. 1897; died 1920)
- Education: Richmond Hill Law School
- Profession: Politician, jurist

William Alexander Hoke (October 25, 1851 – September 13, 1925) was a North Carolina politician and jurist who served as an associate justice (1905–1924) and chief justice (1924–1925) of the North Carolina Supreme Court.

Born in Lincolnton, North Carolina, Hoke's father was a cousin of General Robert Hoke. He studied law under Chief Justice Richmond Mumford Pearson at Richmond Hill Law School. A Democrat, "Alex" Hoke, as he was known, represented Lincoln County in the North Carolina House of Representatives in 1889 and was elected a state Superior Court judge the following year. He was elected to the state Supreme Court in 1904 as an associate justice. Re-elected in 1912 and 1920, Hoke was appointed chief justice on June 2, 1924, by Governor Cameron Morrison, upon the death of Walter Clark. Although he was elected chief justice in November 1924, Hoke resigned in March 1925 due to failing health. He died on September 13, 1925, and is buried in St. Luke's Episcopal Church Cemetery in Lincolnton, North Carolina.

A friend of Zebulon B. Vance, Hoke chaired the commission to provide a statue of Vance for Statuary Hall in the United States Capitol.

Legal offices
Preceded by Walter Clark	Chief Justice of North Carolina Supreme Court; 1924 - 1925	Succeeded by Walter P. Stacy
