= Hamilton G. Ewart =

American judge (1849–1918)

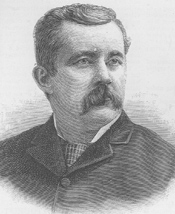

Judge of the United States District Court for the Western District of North Carolina
- In office April 13, 1899 – June 7, 1900
- Appointed by: William McKinley
- Preceded by: himself
- Succeeded by: James Edmund Boyd

Judge of the United States District Court for the Western District of North Carolina
- In office July 13, 1898 – March 3, 1899
- Appointed by: William McKinley
- Preceded by: Robert P. Dick
- Succeeded by: himself

Member of the U.S. House of Representatives from North Carolina's 9th district
- In office March 4, 1889 – March 3, 1891
- Preceded by: Thomas D. Johnston
- Succeeded by: William T. Crawford

Personal details
- Born: Hamilton Glover Ewart; October 23, 1849 Columbia, South Carolina
- Died: April 28, 1918 (aged 68) Chicago, Illinois
- Resting place: Oakdale Cemetery; Hendersonville, North Carolina
- Party: Republican

Hamilton Glover Ewart (October 23, 1849 – April 28, 1918) was a United States representative from North Carolina and a United States district judge of the United States District Court for the Western District of North Carolina.

== Education and career ==
Born on October 23, 1849, in Columbia, Richland County, South Carolina, Ewart attended private schools and moved with his parents to Hendersonville, Henderson County, North Carolina in 1862. He received a Bachelor of Laws in 1876 from the University of South Carolina School of Law. He was admitted to the bar and commenced practice in Hendersonville in 1870. He was a Referee in Bankruptcy for the United States District Court for the Western District of North Carolina starting in 1872. He was a delegate to the 1876 Republican National Convention. He was the Mayor of Hendersonville from 1878 to 1879. He was a member of the North Carolina House of Representatives from 1887 to 1889, and from 1895 to 1897.

== Congressional service ==
Ewart was elected as a Republican from North Carolina's 9th congressional district to the United States House of Representatives of the 51st United States Congress and served from March 4, 1889, to March 3, 1891. He was an unsuccessful candidate for reelection in 1890 to the 52nd United States Congress and for election in 1904.

== State judicial service ==
After his departure from Congress, Ewart served as a Judge of the Henderson County Criminal Court from 1895 to 1896. He was a Judge of the North Carolina Superior Court for the Twelfth Judicial District from 1897 to 1898.

== Federal judicial service ==
Ewart was nominated by President McKinley to the United States District Court for the Western District of North Carolina on January 27, 1898, but the United States Senate never voted on his nomination.

Ewart received a recess appointment from President William McKinley on July 13, 1898, to a seat on the United States District Court for the Western District of North Carolina vacated by Judge Robert P. Dick. He was nominated to the same position by President McKinley on December 13, 1898. His service terminated on March 3, 1899, after his nomination was not confirmed by the United States Senate, which never voted on his nomination. Ewart received a second recess appointment from President McKinley on April 13, 1899, to the seat vacated by himself. He was nominated to the same position by President McKinley on December 19, 1899. His service terminated on June 7, 1900, after his nomination was not confirmed by the Senate, which never voted on his nomination.

== Later career and death ==
Following his departure from the federal bench, Ewart resumed private practice in Hendersonville. He was a member of the North Carolina House of Representatives from 1911 to 1913. He continued private practice in Chicago, Illinois from 1916 to 1918. He died on April 28, 1918, in Chicago of diarrhea related dehydration. He was interred in Oakdale Cemetery in Hendersonville.

== See also ==
- Unsuccessful recess appointments to United States federal courts

== Sources ==
- "Hamilton G. Ewart". Biographical Directory of the United States Congress.

U.S. House of Representatives
Preceded by Thomas D. Johnston	Member of the U.S. House of Representatives from North Carolina's 9th congressional district 1889–1891	Succeeded by William T. Crawford
Legal offices
Preceded by Robert P. Dick	Judge of the United States District Court for the Western District of North Carolina; 1898–1899	Succeeded by himself
Preceded by himself	Judge of the United States District Court for the Western District of North Carolina; 1899–1900	Succeeded by James Edmund Boyd
