= Richmond Pearson =

American politician (1852–1923)

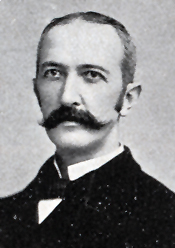
- Richmond Pearson, US Representative from North Carolina.

Member of the U.S. House of Representatives from North Carolina's 9th district
- In office March 4, 1895 – March 3, 1899
- Preceded by: William T. Crawford
- Succeeded by: William T. Crawford
- In office May 10, 1900 – March 3, 1901
- Preceded by: William T. Crawford
- Succeeded by: James M. Moody

Personal details
- Born: January 26, 1852 Richmond Hill, North Carolina, U.S.
- Died: September 12, 1923 (aged 71) Asheville, North Carolina, U.S.
- Party: Republican
- Spouse: Gabrielle Thomas (m. 1882)
- Children: 4

Richmond Mumford Pearson, Jr. (January 26, 1852 – September 12, 1923) was an American diplomat and member of the U.S. House of Representatives from North Carolina.

== Biography ==
Richmond Mumford Pearson, Jr. was born 26 January 1852 at Richmond Hill in Yadkin County, North Carolina, the fourth of five children of North Carolina Supreme Court Justice Richmond Mumford Pearson. US Army major general Richmond P. Davis was his nephew.

Pearson attended Horner Military Academy and Princeton College. He studied law and was admitted to the bar in 1874. The same year he was appointed United States consul to Verviers and Liège, Belgium, which he resigned in 1877.

In 1882, he married Gabrielle Thomas. They had four children.

Pearson was elected to one term (1884–86) in the North Carolina House of Representatives and later to two consecutive terms in the U.S. House, serving from 1895 to 1899. When he ran for re-election in 1898, he was initially declared the loser, and William T. Crawford the winner. But he successfully contested the election and was seated for the last half of the Fifty-sixth Congress (May 10, 1900 to March 1901).

President Theodore Roosevelt appointed Pearson consul to Genoa in 1901, ambassador to Persia in 1902, and ambassador to Greece and Montenegro in 1907. He retired from the diplomatic service in 1909, and lived most of his later life at his home in Asheville, North Carolina, called "Richmond Hill" (the same name as his father's home in Yadkin County). It was there that he died in 1923.

U.S. House of Representatives
Preceded by William T. Crawford	Member of the U.S. House of Representatives from North Carolina's 9th congressional district March 4, 1895 – March 3, 1899	Succeeded by William T. Crawford
Preceded by William T. Crawford	Member of the U.S. House of Representatives from North Carolina's 9th congressional district May 10, 1900 – March 3, 1901	Succeeded by James M. Moody
Diplomatic posts
Preceded by Lloyd C. Griscom	United States Minister to Persia; 1902–1907	Succeeded by John Brinkerhoff Jackson
Preceded by John Brinkerhoff Jackson	United States Minister to Greece; 1907–1909	Succeeded by George H. Moses
