= Frederick Nash =

American judge

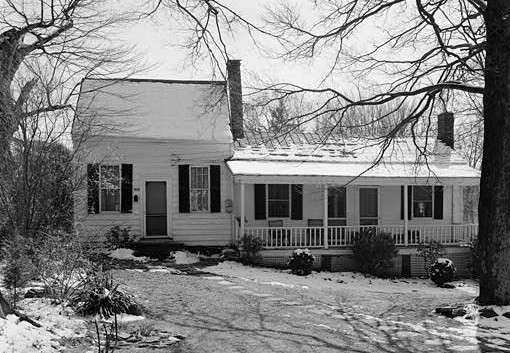
Nash Law Office, HABS photo, February 1965

Frederick Nash (February 9, 1781 – December 5, 1858) was an American lawyer and jurist from Hillsborough, North Carolina. He served on the North Carolina Supreme Court and was its chief justice from 1852 until his death.

Frederick was the son of Governor Abner Nash and Mary Jones Nash, Abner's second wife. He was born in New Bern, and attended Princeton University, graduating in 1799. He returned home to read law, and to set up a law practice in New Bern.

Nash moved to Hillsborough in 1807, and was elected to the North Carolina General Assembly, serving from 1813 to 1817. He was a judge of Superior Court from 1818 to 1824 and again from 1836 until his election as an associate judge of the state's Supreme Court in 1844. When Justice Thomas Ruffin resigned in 1852, Nash was raised to Chief Justice and held that post until his death.

He died at home in Hillsborough. Nash was married twice: first to Mary Kollock, then after her death to Anna Maria MacLean. After Frederick died, his daughters, Sally (1811–1893) and Maria (1819–1907), opened a school for young ladies in the family home at Hillsborough. His grandson, Francis "Frank" Nash (1855–1932), was for many years an assistant attorney general for North Carolina and clerk of the state Supreme Court.

His office at Hillsborough was listed on the National Register of Historic Places in 1971. It is located in the Hillsborough Historic District.

Legal offices
Preceded by Thomas Ruffin	Chief Justice of North Carolina Supreme Court; 1852 – 1858	Succeeded by Richmond Mumford Pearson
