= James Edmund Boyd =

American judge

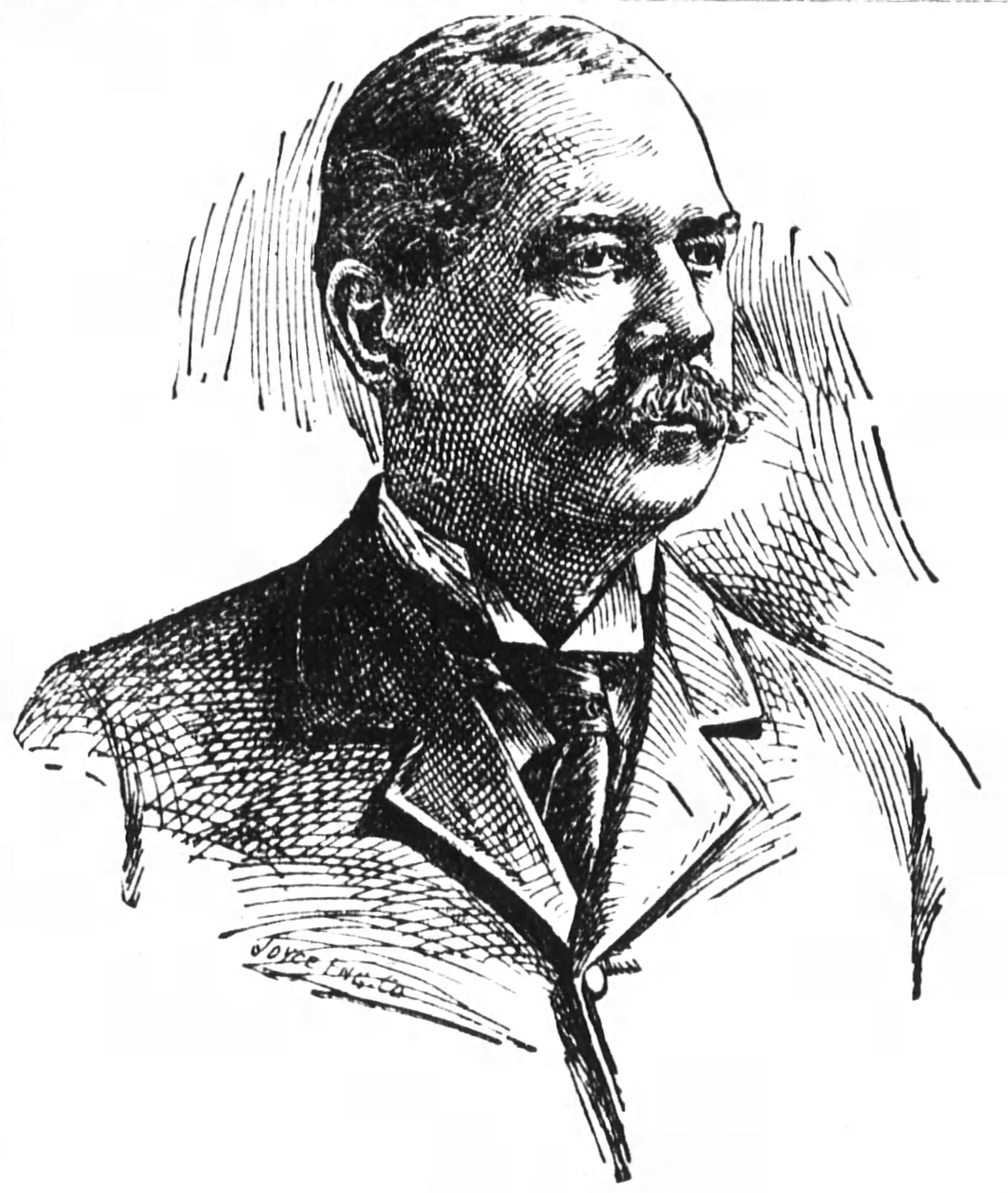

Judge of the United States District Court for the Western District of North Carolina
- In office July 11, 1900 – August 21, 1935
- Appointed by: William McKinley
- Preceded by: Hamilton G. Ewart
- Succeeded by: Seat abolished

Member of the North Carolina House of Representatives
- In office 1874-1875

Personal details
- Born: James Edmund Boyd; February 14, 1845 Alamance County, North Carolina
- Died: August 21, 1935 (aged 90) Greensboro, North Carolina
- Education: Davidson College read law

James Edmund Boyd (February 14, 1845 – August 21, 1935) was a United States district judge of the United States District Court for the Western District of North Carolina.

== Education and career ==
Boyd was born in Alamance County, North Carolina, a child of Archibald J. Boyd and Margaret Wetherly Brannock. He served in the American Civil War as a private in the Confederate States Army (13th North Carolina Infantry and 1st North Carolina Cavalry). Boyd attended Davidson College and read law in 1868. He was in private practice of law in North Carolina from 1868 to 1880. He was a member of the North Carolina House of Representatives from 1874 to 1875 and was a delegate to the North Carolina Constitutional Convention in 1875. He was the United States Attorney for the Western District of North Carolina from 1880 to 1885. He was again in private practice of law in North Carolina from 1885 to 1897. He was a United States Assistant Attorney General from 1897 to 1900.

Boyd supervised the federal investigations into the Wilmington massacre of 1898 in North Carolina and the Phoenix Election Riot in South Carolina. No white person accused of killing black citizens was prosecuted in either state. The December 8 issue of the Wilmington Messenger reported that Boyd was arrested by federal agents and accused of membership in the Ku Klux Klan.

== Federal judicial service ==
Boyd received a recess appointment from President William McKinley on July 11, 1900, to a seat on the United States District Court for the Western District of North Carolina vacated by Judge Hamilton G. Ewart. He was nominated to the same position by President McKinley on December 15, 1900. He was confirmed by the United States Senate on January 9, 1901, and received his commission the same day. On or about October 31, 1919, President Woodrow Wilson certified Boyd involuntarily as disabled in accordance with the act of February 25, 1919, 40 Stat. 1156, which authorized the President to appoint an additional judge for the court and provided that no successor to the judge certified as disabled would be appointed. Judge Edwin Y. Webb was appointed to the additional judgeship authorized by the statute. Boyd continued to render a reduced level of service to the court. His service terminated on August 21, 1935, due to his death in Greensboro, North Carolina.

== See also ==
- List of United States federal judges by longevity of service

== Sources ==
- Zucchino, David (2020). Wilmington's Lie: The Murderous Coup of 1898 and the Rise of White Supremacy. Atlantic Monthly Press. ISBN 9780802128386.

Legal offices
| Preceded by Hamilton G. Ewart | Judge of the United States District Court for the Western District of North Carolina; 1900–1935 | Succeeded by Seat abolished |
