= Richmond Hill Law School =

Historic school building in North Carolina, United States

- U.S. National Register of Historic Places
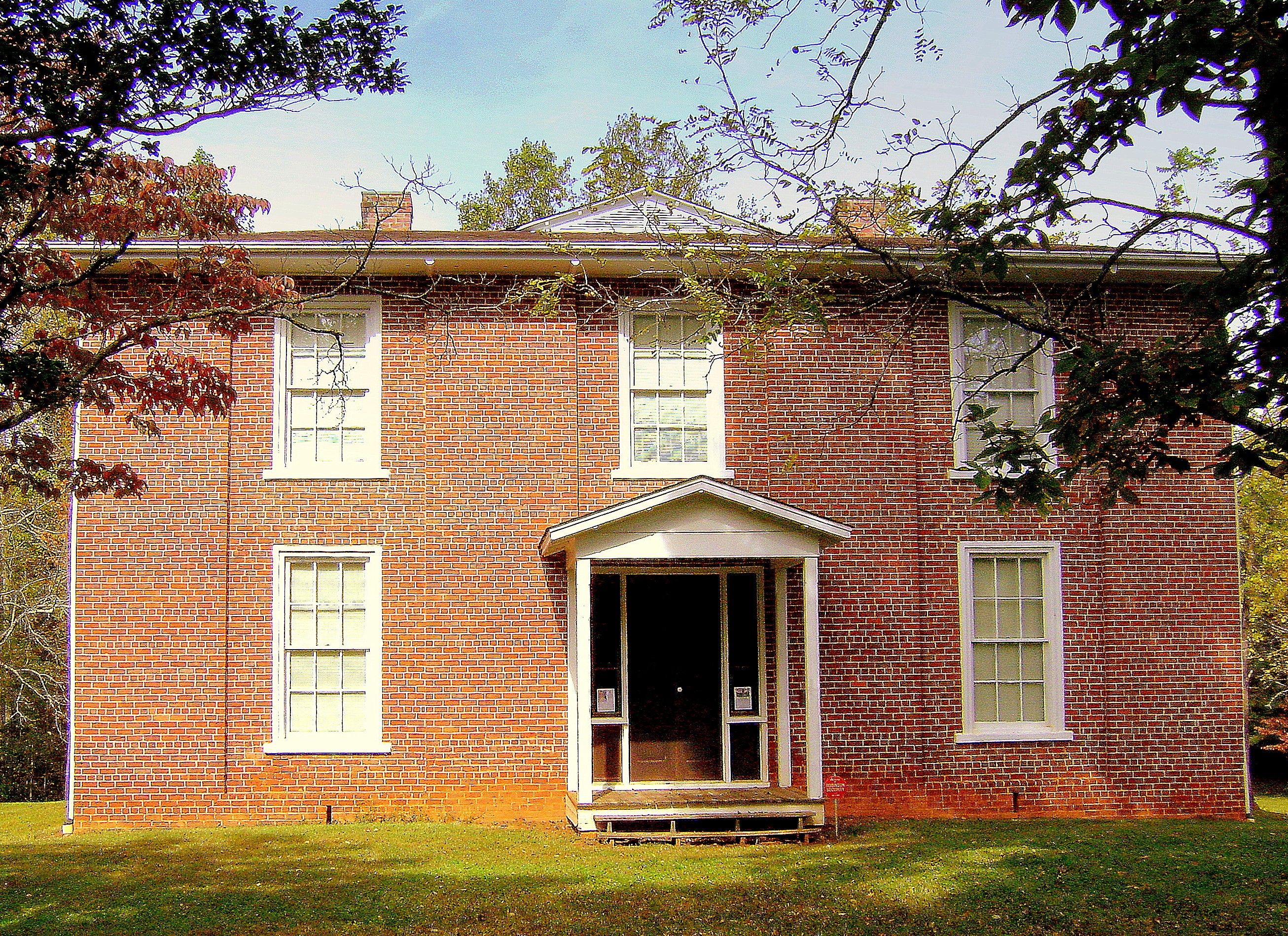
- Richmond Hill Law School, October 2011

- Location within North Carolina Location within the United States
- Location: North of Richmond Hill on SR 1530, near Richmond Hill, North Carolina
- Coordinates: 36°16′4″N 80°36′46″W
- Area: 9.5 acres (3.8 ha)
- Built: 1848
- NRHP reference No.: 70000483
- Added to NRHP: October 15, 1970

Richmond Hill Law School is a historic home and law school building located near Richmond Hill, Yadkin County, North Carolina. It was built in 1848, and is a two-story, three-bay, "T"-plan, brick building. It has a low hipped roof and deep overhang. It was built as the home and law school of jurist Richmond Mumford Pearson.

Among those who studied at the school were Secretary of the Interior Jacob Thompson, State Chief Justices William A. Hoke and David Furches, U.S. District Judge Thomas Settle, Congressman William H. H. Cowles, Governors John W. Ellis, Daniel Gould Fowle and Robert B. Glenn, and two-term Mayor of Charlotte, NC, William Johnston. The property is owned by the Yadkin County Historical Society.

It operated as a law school from 1848 until the death of Pearson in 1878.

It was listed on the National Register of Historic Places in 1970.

== See also ==
- List of defunct law schools in the United States
