= Robert P. Dick =

American judge

Robert Paine Dick

Judge of the United States District Court for the Western District of North Carolina
- In office June 7, 1872 – July 6, 1898
- Appointed by: Ulysses S. Grant
- Preceded by: Seat established by 17 Stat. 215
- Succeeded by: Hamilton G. Ewart

Personal details
- Born: Robert Paine Dick; October 5, 1823 Greensboro, North Carolina
- Died: September 12, 1898 (aged 74) Greensboro, North Carolina
- Education: University of North Carolina at Chapel Hill read law

Robert Paine Dick (October 5, 1823 – September 12, 1898) was a United States district judge of the United States District Court for the Western District of North Carolina.

== Education and career ==
Born on October 5, 1823, in Greensboro, North Carolina, Dick graduated from the University of North Carolina at Chapel Hill in 1843 and read law in 1845. He entered private practice in Wentworth, North Carolina from 1845 to 1848. He continued private practice in Greensboro from 1848 to 1853. He was the United States attorney for the Albemarle, Cape Fear, and Pamptico Districts of North Carolina from 1853 to 1861. He was a member of the North Carolina Council of State from 1862 to 1864. He was a member of the North Carolina Senate from 1864 to 1865. He resumed private practice in Greensboro from 1865 to 1868. He was an associate justice of the Supreme Court of North Carolina from 1868 to 1872.

== Federal judicial service ==
Dick received a recess appointment to the United States District Court for the Albemarle, Cape Fear and Pamptico Districts of North Carolina on May 29, 1865, but declined the appointment.

Dick was nominated by President Ulysses S. Grant on June 7, 1872, to the United States District Court for the Western District of North Carolina, to a new seat authorized by 17 Stat. 215. He was confirmed by the United States Senate on June 7, 1872, and received his commission the same day. His service terminated on July 6, 1898, due to his retirement.

== Death ==
Dick died on September 12, 1898, in Greensboro.

== Sources ==
- Lanman, Charles (May 7, 1887). Biographical Annals of the Civil Government of the United States: From Original and Official Sources. J.M. Morrison. p. 139 – via Internet Archive. "robert p dick nc supreme court."

Legal offices
Preceded by Seat established by 17 Stat. 215	Judge of the United States District Court for the Western District of North Carolina; 1872–1898	Succeeded by Hamilton G. Ewart
