= Richmond Hill Inn =

Historic house in Asheville, North Carolina, US

Coordinates: 35°36′43.39″N 82°34′50.65″W

The Richmond Hill Inn was a 25-room inn located on the historic Richmond Hill estate in Asheville, North Carolina. It was a Queen Anne style mansion that was built in 1889 and was destroyed by an arson fire in 2009. It served as the private residence of ambassador and congressman Richmond Pearson. Its name derives from a combination of its builder, Richmond Pearson, and the designer, James G. Hill. At the time of its construction, the mansion was one of the most elegant structures in Asheville, with running water, ten fireplaces, and a pulley-operated baggage elevator. It served as a center for social and political activity for many years during Pearson's life. The Estate is located on French Broad River, surrounded by rolling grounds with gardens.

== Relocation and renovation ==
In 1984, the Pearson heirs sold the Richmond Hill estate. The Preservation Society of Asheville & Buncombe County saved the mansion from demolition and had it moved 600 feet. The mansion underwent a $3 million restoration before being opened as part of an Inn in 1989. The second and third floors housed 12 guest rooms, while the first floor contained a restaurant called Gabrielle's, a grand Oak Hall, library, and front parlor.

Two other additions have been made since the initial reopening, both designed by architect Jim Samsel. A manicured croquet court with 8 cottages overlooking the greens were built in 1990. A new building called The Garden Pavilion was added in 1996, containing 16 guest rooms and overlooking a Victorian Parterre-style garden.

== 2009 fire ==
On March 19, 2009, a fire —officially ruled arson— destroyed the 120-year-old historic mansion. Due to the size of the fire, an arson investigation began immediately. Within days, Asheville officials confirmed the fire was intentionally set. Foreclosure proceedings had been underway at the time, heightening suspicions.

Within days of the blaze, officials with the Asheville Fire Department, confirmed the discovery of what they considered to be evidence indicating that the fire had been intentionally set. Further suspicions were aroused due to an ongoing legal battle which had led the Buncombe County Clerk of Court ordering that the inn be sold in a foreclosure auction on the Buncombe county court house steps. This foreclose notice was entered into three days before the 2009 fire. The owners at the time of the fire had failed to make mortgage payments on the property since August 2008. This failure to make payments led the previous owners, who had financed the purchase, to seek foreclosure. One day before the 2008 foreclose hearing Richmond Hill Inn (Hammock LLC) managing partner William G Gray and his half sister, The Hammocks LLC/Lake Norman pavilion LLC majority partner Virginia C Love (of the law firm Baker, Donelson, Bearman, Caldwell & Berkowitz, PC) filed suit against the former owners and mortgage holders for alleged faulty pipes on the property. In addition, the Buncombe county tax assessor was seeking over $64,000 in property taxes from 2008 .

=== Civil and criminal outcome ===
No arrests were ever made, but in December 2012, a federal jury ruled that the ownership company, The Hammocks LLC, was responsible for the fire, resulting in denial of the insurance claim.

The next transcript deals with testimony in regard to William Gray losing his license to practice medicine over charges of sexual misconduct with his under age male patients see medical board documents below.

The bankruptcy court for the Eastern District of North Carolina has granted a motion for the state lawsuit in regard to the alleged faulty pipes at the Richmond Hill Inn to proceed in state court.

=== OM Sanctuary and site today ===
In August 2011, Oshun Mountain Sanctuary (OM Sanctuary), a nonprofit, purchased the property to transform it into a holistic wellness retreat on approximately 54 acres. The cottages survived the fire, and the property continues to operate as a retreat center. No criminal charges were ever filed, but the insurance company prevailed in civil court.

=== Conservation and future development ===
Much of the surrounding land has been preserved. As of early 2025, conservation efforts have expanded Richmond Hill Park from 180 to nearly 263 acres, safeguarding forested land along the French Broad River.

== Bankruptcy court case, documents and transcripts ==
The Harleysville Mutual Insurance Company has filed a pleading in bankruptcy court for the Eastern District of North Carolina denying liability for the insurance claim for the arson and for the following reasons, quote "9. The Policy excludes recovery for loss where the loss is caused by criminal, fraudulent, dishonest, or illegal acts committed by the insured or those with an interest in the property. Document Page 2 of 9. 11. As alleged in greater detail in the Complaint, Harleysville believes, and expects to be able to prove at trial, that under these exclusions it has complete defenses to the Demand, including that (a) the fire was caused by the Debtor's arson and (b) that in applying for the Policy the Debtor made material misrepresentations. Document page 3 of 9 " end quote.

The Harleysville Mutual Insurance Company filed a petition in the bankruptcy court for the eastern district of North Carolina to remove the civil arson case from bankruptcy court to federal district court and to request a trial by jury. This has been so ordered by the court The Harleysville Mutual Insurance Company deposed (questioned) William Gilman Gray under oath on June 10 and 11 2009. The questions and answers where wide-ranging as follows, William Gray did not take a lie detector test at the request of the Ashville fire department so the identity of the one person who did is still a mystery . Under questioning William Gray testified to a letter his sister Virginia C love, The Hammocks LLC/Lake Norman pavilion LLC majority partner (of the law firm Baker, Donelson, Bearman, Caldwell & Berkowitz, PC) sent to a Jim Sloggart demanding money for failure to perform as a partner in The hammocks LLC William Gray was asked to speculate as to whom may have burned down the Richmond Hill Inn he stated that he could not imagine the following people would have "done it themselves" but may have had motive to do so, Jim Sloggart, Mrs Micheal(the note holder)and Bland Holland a former Richmond Hill Inn manager. At some point before the arson the night watchmen had been laid off The next transcript discuses Virginia c love's law firm Baker, Donelson, Bearman, Caldwell & Berkowitz, PC doing the accounting and tax returns for the Richmond hill Inn.this transcript also has William Gray stating that at an employee meeting held several days after the arson the entire staff of the kitchen and dining room resigned in mass.William gray testified that he provided copy's of an audit to all owners of the Hammocks LLC except his other sister Mary Mullins.William Gray testified that he knew at the time of the purchase of the Richmond Hill Inn that it was a financial failure The fourth transcript discusses the sell of the Richmond Hill Inn. Rockey Lapomardo from Florida is a friend of Virginia C love and has tried to sell the property so far without success. The Lapomardo firm still has images of the property for sell from before the arson the sixth transcript contains testimony from William Gray as to a call from Jim Sloggart right after the arson quote, "well, you know they are going to blame us for doing it' And I said, probably." The next transcript contains testimony in regard to allegations that William Gray lost his license to practice medicine due to sexual misconduct with his under age male patients. William Gray gives testimony in regard to 1977 California Medical Board allegations of sexual misconduct with male patients(the first California case) The bankruptcy court for the western district of North Carolina has granted a motion for the state lawsuit in regard to the alleged faulty pipes at the Richmond Hill Inn to proceed in state court.Further testimony was given in regard to whether William Gray told employees he was bipolar William Gray denied he made any such statement. Testimony on page 76 In a recently filed document in the Federal District Court for western North Carolina The Harleysville Mutual Insurance Company makes the statement that it believes that the arson was set by The Hammocks LLC's "Authorized agents" On January 20 in bankruptcy court for the western region of North Carolina there is a hearing scheduled to argue whether to convert the Richmond Hill Inn from a Chapter 11 to a chapter 7 liquidation, to decide whether to accept "the plan" submitted by the debtor, to appoint the US trustee for the estate and to examine the Hammocks LLC financial discloser statements.The US trustee an employee of the court has objected to the financial discloser statement, "the plan" and has asked the judge to convert the case to a liquidation bankruptcy. The US trustees motion to convert the case to a chapter 7 and/or appoint a chapter 11 trustee was denied in a hearing 20 January 2010 Thus The Hammocks LLC doing business as the Richmond Hill Inn shall remain as debtor in possession in till such time as there is a discharge from bankruptcy court.

It appears that the managing partners plan to shut down the Richmond Hill Inn soon under a chapter 11 "liquidation plan" and sell the real estate to satisfy the mortgage owed The bankruptcy court for the western district of North Carolina has objected to this plan as it is not transparent. It does not disclose partner compensation. It does not disclose timing of this "liquidation" It is noted it does not appear that employees or future guests have been notified of this plan. The Richmond hill Inn has closed for the winter but appears to be still taking reservations for April 2010. It is not known if Richmond hill inn is collecting deposits on wedding reservations. As of late February 2010 the Richmond Hill Inn website is reporting that it will not reopen in April 2010, due to arson by former employees.

== Controversy over media coverage of William Gilman Gray managing partner of Hammock LLC d/b/a Richmond Hill Inn ==
Local paper Asheville Citizen-Times ran an article on Richmond Hill Inn managing partner William G Gray on his past criminal arrest record for allegedly molesting boys in several states over the last three decades and surrendering his license to practice medicine in lieu of a hearing or after a hearing in many states. The article generated intense controversy in the community as to its content. There appear to be federal government documents that support the controversy in regard to William G Gray losing his DEA license to proscribe controlled substances for "his prescribing or dispensing various controlled substances to several individuals, two of whom were minors, without a legitimate medical purpose and outside the scope of professional practice" and there appear to be state of California, North Carolina and state of Virginia documents in regard to alleged criminal behavior in regard to minors And a Revocation of license to practice for a "mental abnormality" in regard to behavior towards his male minor patients It is a public policy question to note that William Gilmans Gray's 1977 surrender of his California license to practice medicine still does not appear on the California's medical board website.

The ownership management team at the Richmond Hill Inn did release a statement prepared by the public relations firm of Dan Kellerby Media of Nashville, TN. It tells of the hardships in the hotel industry in the last years of the economic crises and alleged forced cutbacks on staff and the ownership structure's family and emotional attachment to the community. This is an example of a case study of multi-media tourism marketing before the fire

== Continued Operation After Fire ==
The Richmond Hill Inn re-opened after the 2009 fire and continued to operate under chapter 11 bankruptcy protection , even though the mansion was destroyed and Gabrielle's Restaurant was destroyed due to the arson. In August 2011, Oshun Mountain Sanctuary (OM Sanctuary) purchased the Richmond Hill Inn to transform the property into a holistic education retreat center. It appears that this non profit has a website here http://www.omsanctuary.org/ the non profit's mission https://www.youtube.com/watch?v=n74W8aYVxY0
