= Walter P. Stacy =

American judge

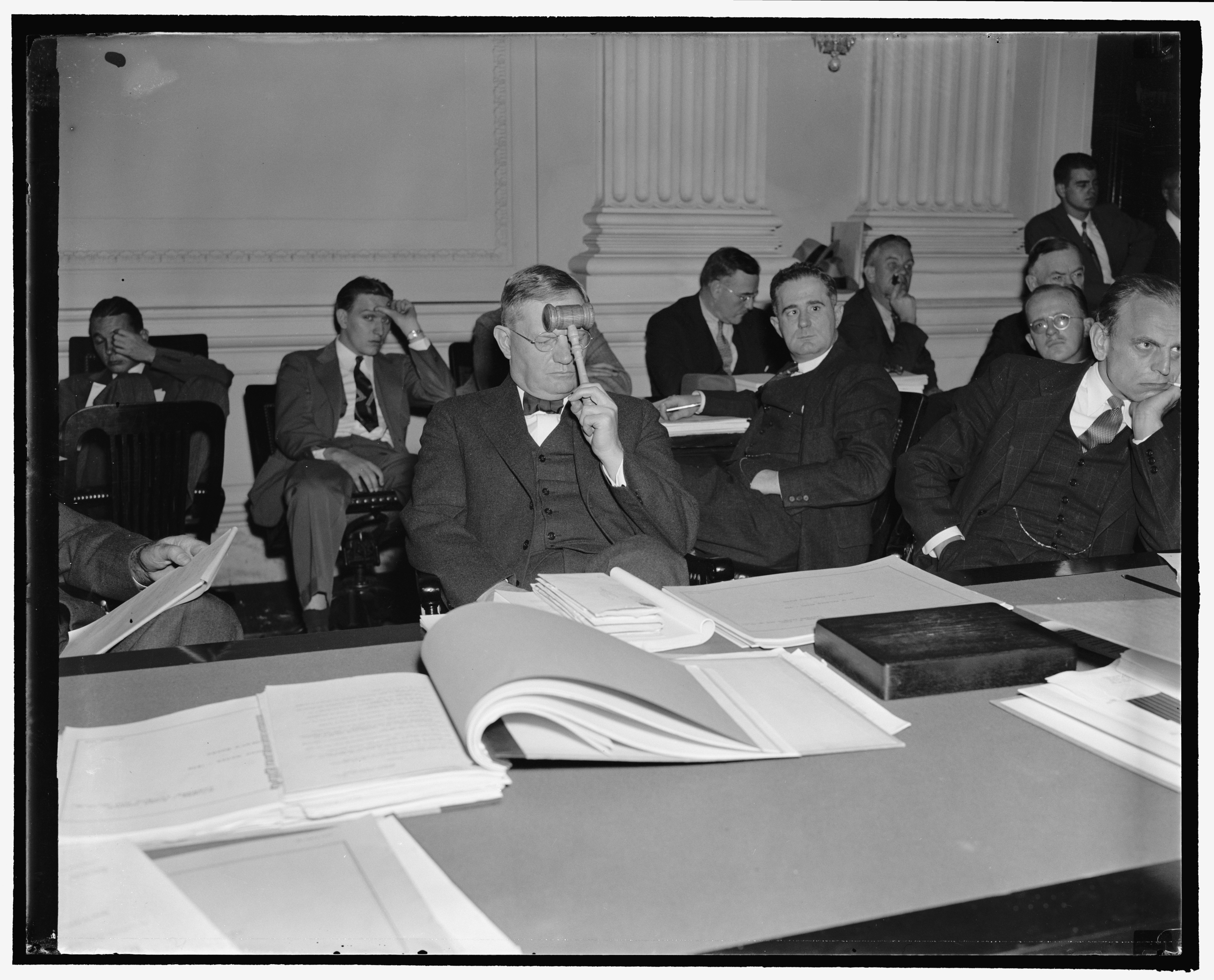

Chief Justice of the North Carolina Supreme Court
- In office 1925 – September 13, 1951
- Preceded by: William A. Hoke
- Succeeded by: William A. Devin

Personal details
- Born: Walter Parker Stacy; December 26, 1884 Ansonville, North Carolina, U.S.
- Died: September 13, 1951 (aged 66)
- Education: University of North Carolina at Chapel Hill
- Profession: Judge
- Known for: Longest serving chief justice of the North Carolina Supreme Court

Walter Parker Stacy (December 26, 1884 in Ansonville, North Carolina – September 13, 1951) was a chief justice of the North Carolina Supreme Court from 1925 until his death in 1951. He is the longest-serving chief justice in North Carolina history.

He attended Weaverville College and Morven High School.

Stacy was a 1908 graduate of the University of North Carolina at Chapel Hill, where a scholarship for law students was later established in his memory. He was president of the UNC General Alumni Association in 1925.

Stacy was elected to the North Carolina House of Representatives from New Hanover County for a term, then appointed to the North Carolina Superior Court, and elected as an associate justice of the North Carolina Supreme Court in 1920. In 1925, Governor Angus Wilton McLean appointed Stacy, by then the Court's senior associate justice, chief justice after the resignation of William A. Hoke. In 1926, Stacy was elected to continue in the post over Republican James J. Britt.

While Stacy was serving as chief justice, President Franklin D. Roosevelt appointed him to serve on key boards, including the National Steel Labor Relations Board and the Textile Labor Relations Board. In 1937, Roosevelt closely considered Stacy for an opening on the U.S. Supreme Court but in the end the appointment went to Hugo Black. Later, President Harry S. Truman appointed Stacy to a fact-finding board to consider a labor dispute between General Motors and the United Auto Workers and to a board on labor problems in government-possessed mines.

Legal offices
Preceded by William A. Hoke	Chief Justice of North Carolina Supreme Court; 1925 - 1951	Succeeded by William A. Devin
