= List of federal judges appointed by William McKinley =

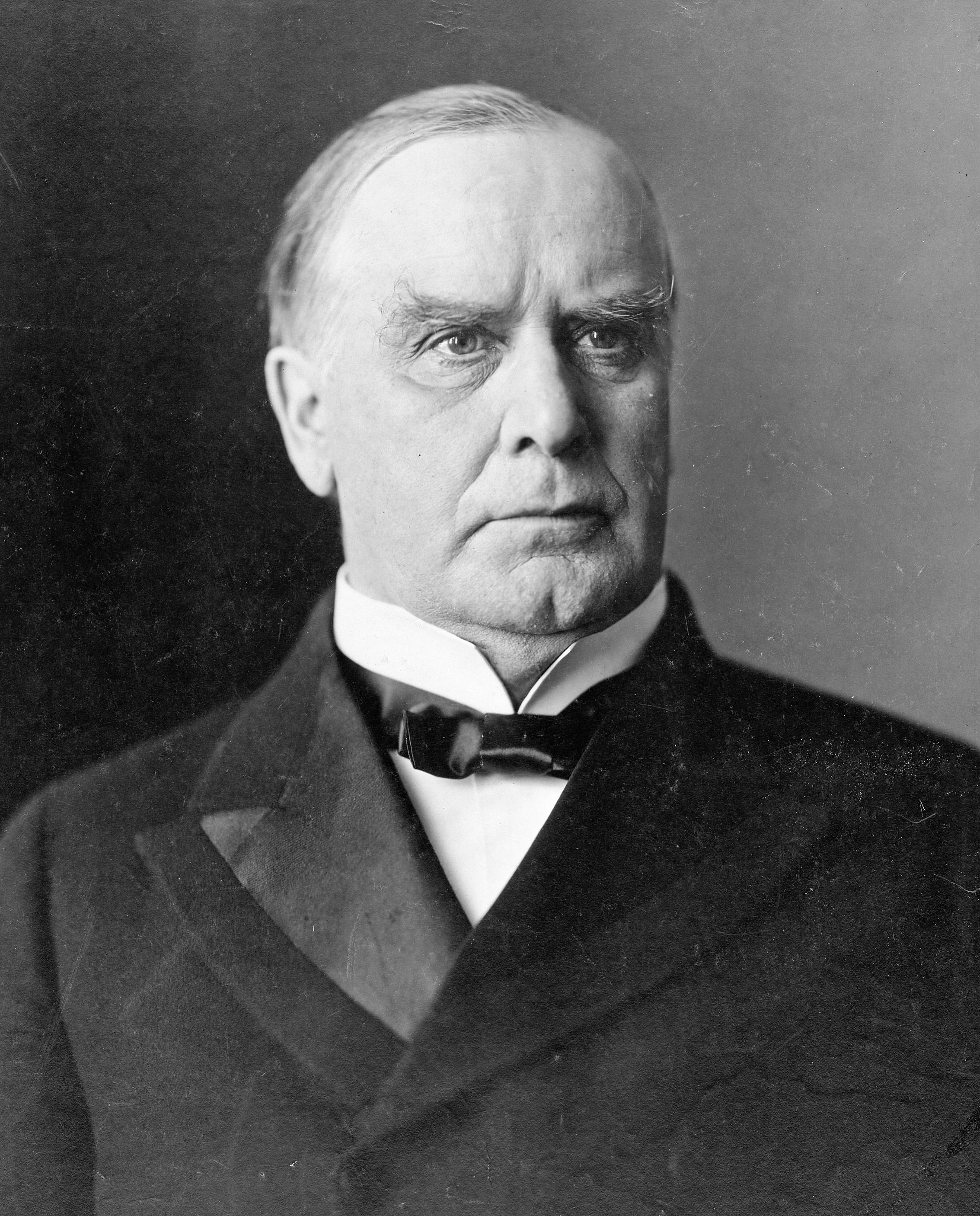
President William McKinley

Following is a list of all Article III United States federal judges appointed by President William McKinley during his presidency. In total McKinley appointed 35 Article III federal judges, including 1 Justice to the Supreme Court of the United States, 6 judges to the United States Courts of Appeals, and 28 judges to the United States district courts.

Additionally, McKinley appointed 3 members of the Article I tribunal Board of General Appraisers (later the United States Customs Court).

From the establishment of the United States courts of appeals on June 16, 1891, until the abolition of the United States circuit courts on December 31, 1911, all United States Circuit Judges where jointly appointed to both the United States court of appeal and the United States circuit court for their respective circuit. Starting January 1, 1912, United States Circuit Judges served only on the United States court of appeal for their respective circuit.

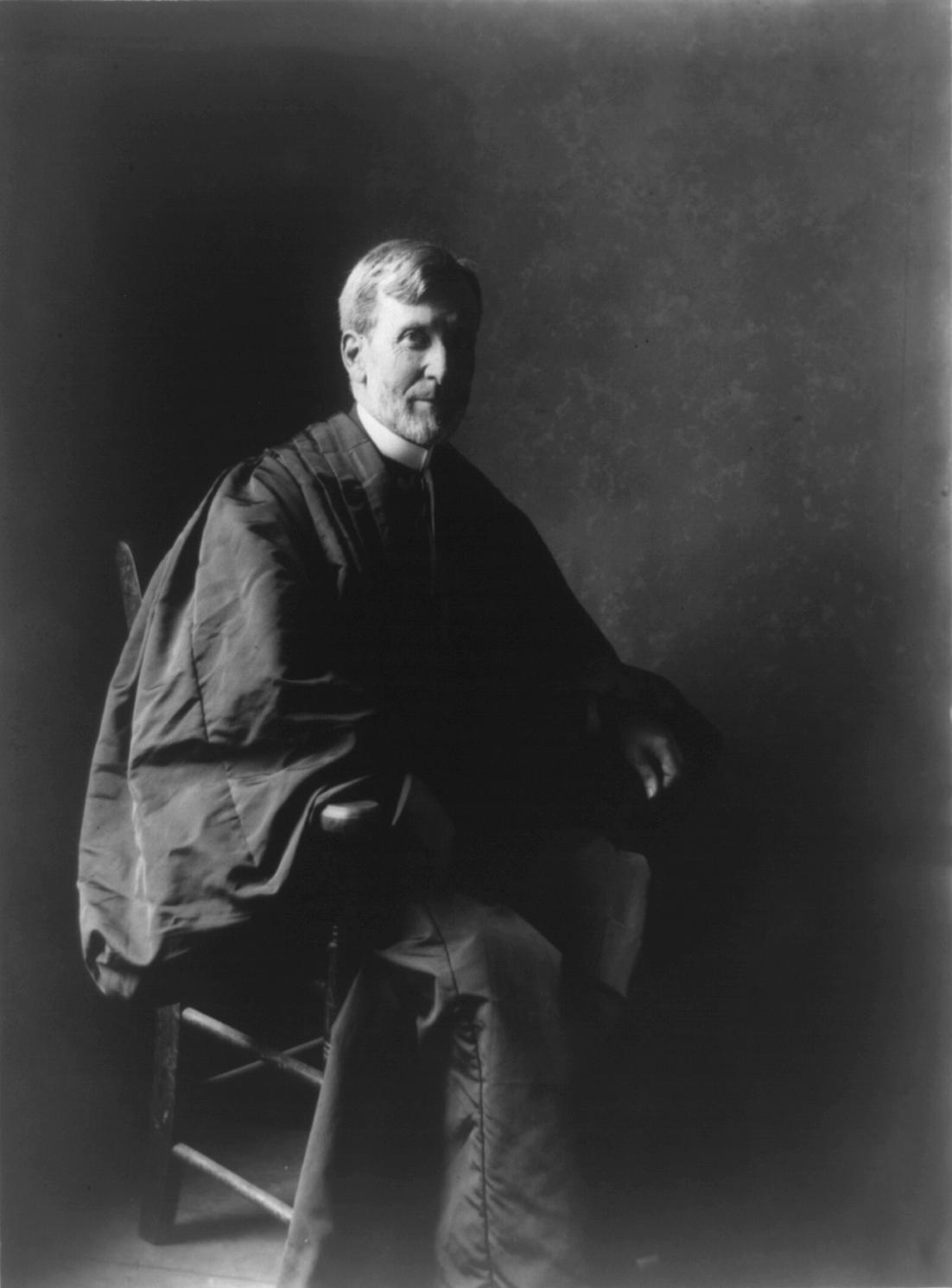
Joseph McKenna was McKinley's only appointment to the Supreme Court.

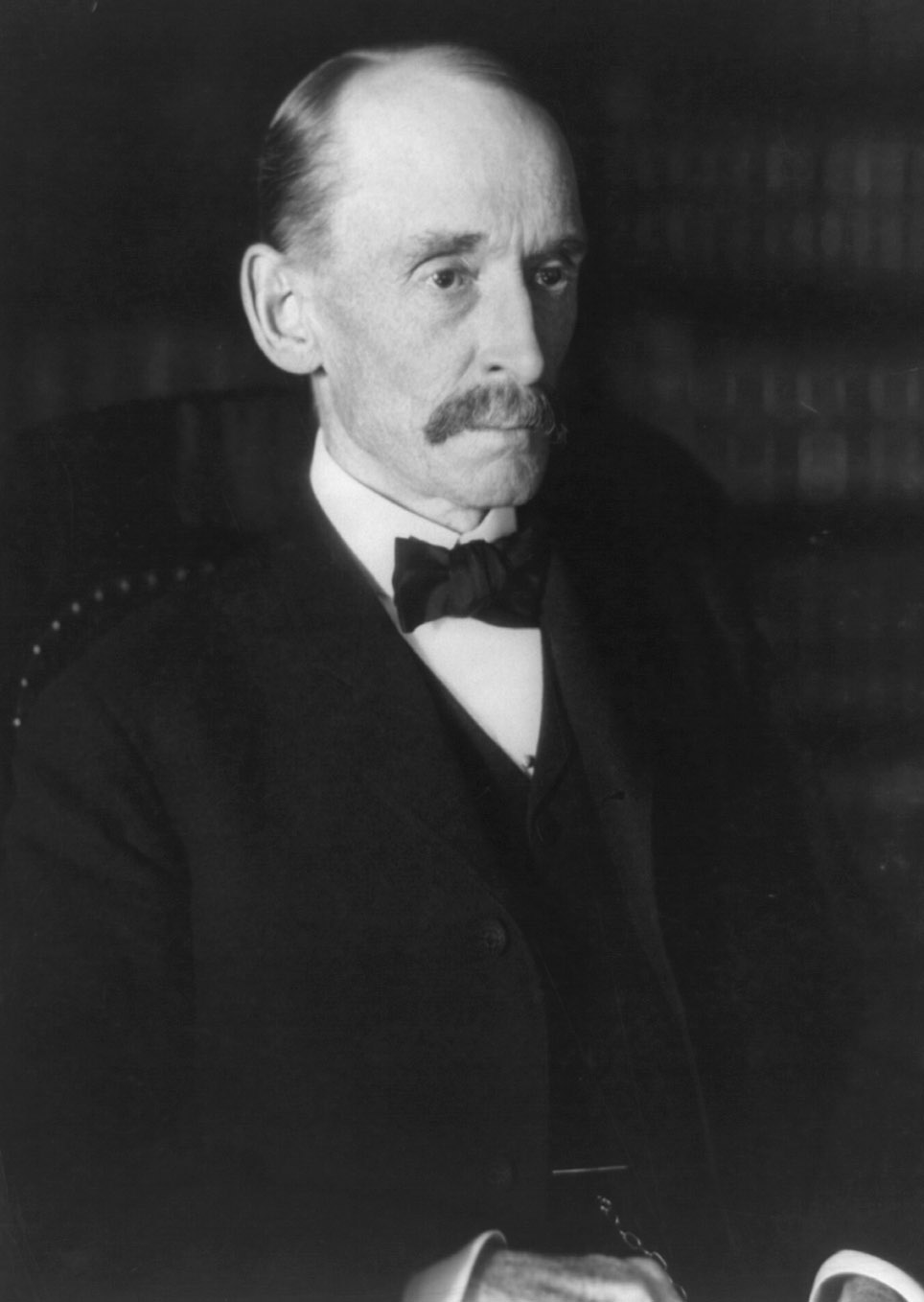
William R. Day, appointed by McKinley to the United States Court of Appeals for the Sixth Circuit, was later elevated to the Supreme Court.

== United States Supreme Court justices ==
#	Justice	Seat	State	Former justice	Nomination date	Confirmation date	Began active service	Ended active service
1	Joseph McKenna	9	California	Stephen Johnson Field	December 16, 1897	January 21, 1898	January 21, 1898	January 5, 1925

== Courts of appeals and circuit courts ==
The United States circuit courts were abolished on January 1, 1912, the final day of service being December 31, 1911.

#	Judge	Circuit	Nomination date	Confirmation date	Began active service	Ended active service	Ended senior status
1	William W. Morrow	Ninth	May 18, 1897	May 20, 1897	May 20, 1897	January 1, 1923	July 24, 1929
2	Peter S. Grosscup	Seventh	January 18, 1899	January 23, 1899	January 23, 1899	October 23, 1911	–
3	William R. Day	Sixth	February 25, 1899	February 28, 1899	February 28, 1899	February 23, 1903	Elevated
4	David Davie Shelby	Fifth	February 21, 1899	March 2, 1899	March 2, 1899	August 22, 1914	–
5	George Gray	Third	December 11, 1899	December 18, 1899	March 29, 1899	June 1, 1914	–
6	Henry Franklin Severens	Sixth	February 6, 1900	February 20, 1900	February 20, 1900	October 3, 1911	–

== District courts ==
#	Judge	Court (Note: See List of United States district and territorial courts)	Nomination date	Confirmation date	Began active service	Ended active service	Ended senior status
1	Thomas Richard Purnell	E.D.N.C.	April 26, 1897	May 5, 1897	May 5, 1897	December 19, 1908	–
2	Edward Green Bradford II	D. Del.	April 26, 1897	May 11, 1897	May 11, 1897	May 20, 1918	–
3	John J. De Haven	N.D. Cal.	June 1, 1897	June 8, 1897	June 8, 1897	January 26, 1913	–
4	Asa Wentworth Tenney	E.D.N.Y.	July 2, 1897	July 8, 1897	July 8, 1897	December 10, 1897	–
5	Francis Cabot Lowell	D. Mass.	January 5, 1898	January 10, 1898	January 10, 1898	April 15, 1905	Elevated
6	Edward B. Thomas	E.D.N.Y.	February 7, 1898	February 15, 1898	February 15, 1898	December 31, 1906	–
7	Edmund Waddill Jr.	E.D. Va.	March 10, 1898	March 22, 1898	March 22, 1898	June 9, 1921	Elevated
8	Hamilton G. Ewart	W.D.N.C.	January 27, 1898 (Note: Renominated on December 13, 1898.)	–	July 13, 1898	March 3, 1899	–
8.1	Hamilton G. Ewart	W.D.N.C.	December 19, 1899	–	April 13, 1899	June 7, 1900	–
9	Edward Roscoe Meek	N.D. Tex.	March 10, 1898	February 15, 1899	July 13, 1898	December 31, 1935	April 10, 1939
10	Albert C. Thompson	S.D. Ohio	December 13, 1898	December 20, 1898	September 23, 1898	January 26, 1910	–
11	William Cather Hook	D. Kan.	January 28, 1899	January 31, 1899	January 31, 1899	December 1, 1903	Elevated
12	Christian Cecil Kohlsaat	N.D. Ill.	February 23, 1899	February 28, 1899	February 28, 1899	March 24, 1905	Elevated
13	Harry M. Clabaugh	D.D.C.	February 21, 1899	March 2, 1899	March 2, 1899	May 1, 1903	–
14	John Bayard McPherson	E.D. Pa.	February 28, 1899	March 2, 1899	March 2, 1899	April 8, 1912	Elevated
15	Walter Evans	D. Ky. / W.D. Ky.	March 3, 1899	March 3, 1899	March 3, 1899	December 30, 1923	–
16	Job Barnard	D.D.C.	December 11, 1899	December 19, 1899	October 1, 1899	June 8, 1914	–
17	George P. Wanty	W.D. Mich.	March 7, 1900	March 13, 1900	March 13, 1900	July 9, 1906	–
18	Smith McPherson	S.D. Iowa	April 3, 1900	May 7, 1900	May 7, 1900	January 17, 1915	–
19	John R. Hazel	W.D.N.Y.	May 18, 1900	June 5, 1900	June 5, 1900	March 5, 1931	–
20	James Edmund Boyd	W.D.N.C.	December 15, 1900	January 9, 1901	July 11, 1900	August 21, 1935	–
21	Jacob Trieber	E.D. Ark.	December 4, 1900	January 9, 1901	July 26, 1900	September 17, 1927	–
22	Francis Joseph Wing	N.D. Ohio	January 21, 1901	January 23, 1901	January 23, 1901	February 1, 1905	–
23	J. Otis Humphrey	S.D. Ill.	March 7, 1901	March 8, 1901	March 8, 1901	June 14, 1918	–
24	Robert W. Archbald	M.D. Pa.	–	–	March 29, 1901	February 1, 1911	Elevated
25	Thomas H. Anderson	D.D.C.	–	–	April 23, 1901	October 1, 1916	–
26	Andrew McConnell January Cochran	E.D. Ky.	–	–	April 24, 1901	June 12, 1934	–
27	Benjamin Franklin Keller	S.D. W. Va.	–	–	June 18, 1901	August 8, 1921	–
28	George B. Adams	S.D.N.Y.	–	–	August 30, 1901	October 9, 1911	–

== Specialty courts (Article I) ==
=== Board of General Appraisers ===
#	Judge	Nomination date	Confirmation date	Began active service	Ended active service
1	William Barberie Howell	February 8, 1899	February 20, 1899	February 24, 1899	April 4, 1927
2	Israel F. Fischer	December 15, 1899	January 17, 1900	May 2, 1899	March 31, 1932
3	Marion De Vries	December 5, 1900	December 10, 1900	June 9, 1900	April 2, 1910

== Notes ==
Renominations

== Sources ==
- Federal Judicial Center
