= William T. Crawford =

American politician and lawyer (1856–1913)

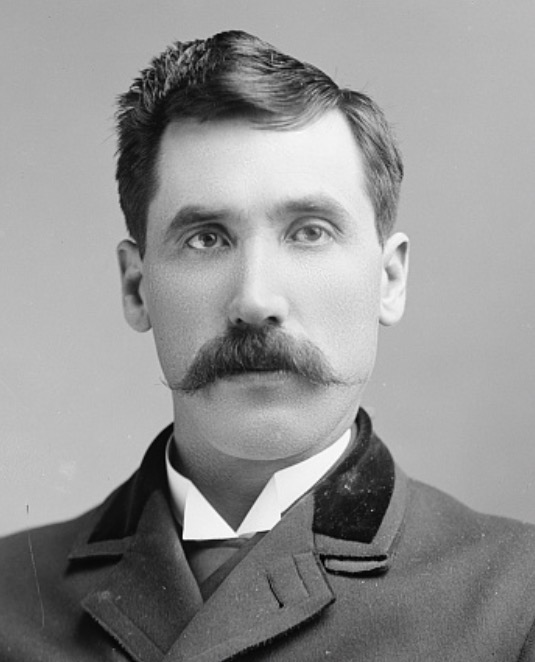
- Portrait of Crawford by Charles Milton Bell, taken between January 1891 and January 1894

Member of the U.S. House of Representatives from North Carolina
- In office March 4, 1891 – March 3, 1895
- Preceded by: Hamilton G. Ewart
- Succeeded by: Richmond Pearson
- Constituency: 9th district
- In office March 4, 1899 – May 10, 1900
- Preceded by: Richmond Pearson
- Succeeded by: Richmond Pearson
- Constituency: 9th district
- In office March 4, 1907 – March 3, 1909
- Preceded by: James M. Gudger Jr.
- Succeeded by: John Gaston Grant
- Constituency: 10th district

Member of the North Carolina House of Representatives from the Haywood County district
- In office 1884–1888

Personal details
- Born: William Thomas Crawford; June 1, 1856 Waynesville, North Carolina, US
- Died: November 16, 1913 (aged 57) Waynesville, North Carolina, US
- Resting place: Green Hill Cemetery
- Party: Democratic
- Children: 7, including Fred
- Occupation: Politician, lawyer

William Thomas Crawford (June 1, 1856 – November 16, 1913) was an American politician and lawyer. A Democrat, he was a member of the United States House of Representatives from North Carolina.

== Early life and education ==
Crawford was born on June 1, 1856, near Waynesville, North Carolina, to a poor family. As a child, he worked his family's farm. Educated at public schools, he attended the academy at Waynesville beginning in 1882. He afterward became a schoolteacher. He worked as a clerk for a general store, and in 1889, was an engrossing clerk of the North Carolina House of Representatives.

Crawford read law while a clerk for the general store. From 1889 to 1891, he studied at the University of North Carolina School of Law, and in 1891, was admitted to the bar, after which he began practicing law in Waynesville.

== Career ==
Crawford was a Democrat. From 1884 to 1888, he represented Haywood County in the North Carolina House of Representatives. He was a member of the United States House of Representatives, from March 4, 1891, to March 3, 1895. He lost the following election. He served as a member-elect from March 4, 1899, to May 10, 1900. He again served from March 4, 1907, to March 3, 1909, losing the following election.

In his first two House terms, Crawford represented North Carolina's 9th district, and in his final term, its 10th district. In 1893, he was a delegate to the American Bimetallic League. From 1900 to 1912, he was a delegate to the North Carolina Democratic conventions, and in 1908, was a delegate to the gubernatorial convention. He was a Presidential elector in the 1888 and 1904 elections. Ideologically, he was liberal. He supported the gold standard, low tariffs, and United States Senate elections decided by popular vote.

After serving in Congress, Crawford returned to practicing law in Waynesville. He was a member of the partnership Crawford & Hannah.

== Personal life and death ==
On November 30, 1892, Crawford married Inez Coman. They had seven children together, including football player Fred Crawford. He was Baptist. He died on November 16, 1913, aged 57, in Waynesville, and was buried at Green Hill Cemetery.

U.S. House of Representatives
Preceded by Hamilton G. Ewart	Member of the U.S. House of Representatives from North Carolina's 9th congressional district 1891–1895	Succeeded by Richmond Pearson
Preceded by Richmond Pearson	Member of the U.S. House of Representatives from North Carolina's 9th congressional district 1899–1900	Succeeded by Richmond Pearson
Preceded by James M. Gudger, Jr.	Member of the U.S. House of Representatives from North Carolina's 10th congressional district 1907–1909	Succeeded by John G. Grant
