= Walter Clark (judge) =

American judge

Walter McKenzie Clark
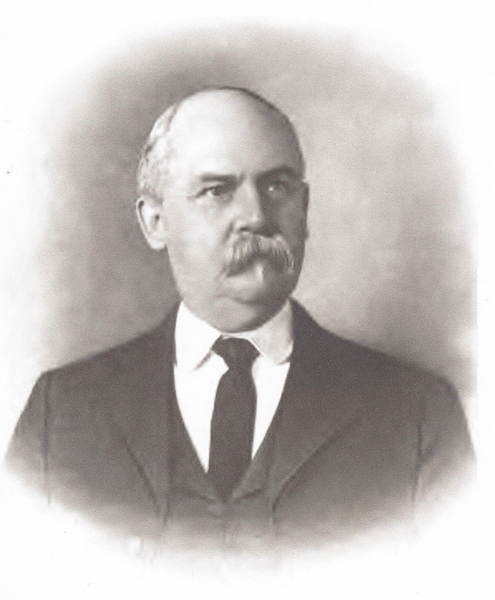

Chief Justice of the North Carolina Supreme Court
- In office 1903–1924
- Preceded by: David M. Furches
- Succeeded by: William A. Hoke

Associate Justice of the North Carolina Supreme Court
- In office 1889–1903

Personal details
- Born: August 19, 1846 Halifax County, North Carolina, US
- Died: May 19, 1924 (aged 77) Raleigh, North Carolina, US
- Spouse: Susan Washington Graham
- Education: University of North Carolina at Chapel Hill
- Occupation: Judge, Lawyer, Politician
- Military career
- Allegiance: Confederate States of America
- Branch: Confederate States Army
- Rank: Lt Colonel (CSA)
- Units: 22nd North Carolina Infantry; 35th North Carolina Infantry; 70th North Carolina Infantry
- Commands: 6th Battalion, North Carolina Junior Reserves
- Conflicts: American Civil War

Walter McKenzie Clark (August 19, 1846 – May 19, 1924) was a North Carolina politician and attorney who served as an associate justice (1889–1903) and chief justice (1903–1924) of the North Carolina Supreme Court.

== Early life ==
Walter McKenzie Clark was born on August 19, 1846 to David Clark II and Anna Maria Thorne at his maternal grandparent's plantation, Prospect Hill, in eastern North Carolina. He grew up at his father's plantation, Ventosa. At an early age he was educated by a tutor before being enrolled at academies near Clarksville, Ridgeway, and Hillsborough.

== Military career ==
In September 1860, Clark's father enrolled him at Hillsborough Military Academy, a prestigious school overseen by Colonel Charles C. Tew. In 1861, the American Civil War broke out, and the state of North Carolina seceded from the United States and joined the Confederate States of America. Colonel Tew's staff appointed Clark, aged 14, as drill master for the first group of volunteer troops assembling at Camp Ellis near Raleigh. In July, the 22nd North Carolina Infantry Regiment was organized under Colonel J. Johnston Pettigrew and Clark joined it as a second lieutenant and drill master. He served it in that capacity while it was encamped in Virginia until November, when he returned to Raleigh to serve as drill master for the 35th North Carolina Infantry Regiment at Camp Mangum.

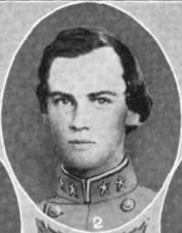
Clark as a Confederate States Army major

In 1862, the 25th Regiment was reassigned to New Bern, and Clark resigned from the unit to resume his studies at Hillsborough Military Academy. A few months later the 35th Regiment was reorganized under Colonel Matt W. Ransom, who appointed Clark adjutant. In August, the regiment was ordered to join the Army of Northern Virginia to participate in the Maryland campaign. Supplied with a slave bodyguard and two horses by his father, Clark served in the ensuing conflict and participated in the Battle of Harpers Ferry and the Battle of Antietam, during the latter of which he was wounded in his hand by a bullet. He thereafter served at the Battle of Fredericksburg. In 1863 the 35th Regiment was withdrawn from front line service to camp near Kenansville, North Carolina to recover from its losses. He resigned from the regiment in February.

Clark at the University of North Carolina at Chapel Hill in the spring of 1863. He read law there, though he conceded to his father that he had "no idea of entering any profession except the army", and graduated on June 2, 1864. (Note: Though provided with a law degree, Clark was not old enough to practice law in North Carolina's courts at the time of his graduation.) The following day he was made major of North Carolina's 5th Battalion, Junior Reserves. On July 4, the First and Sixth Battalions of the Junior Reserves were formed into a regiment, and Clark was made lieutenant colonel. The unit was soon thereafter reorganized and Clark was demoted to major, the rank he held for the rest of the war. He and the regiment were stationed in Weldon for several months to defend the Roanoke River Valley from federal raids. There was little fighting, and Clark was mostly preoccupied with training troops and administrative duties. In October, his unit was moved into Virginia before being reassigned to oversee defenses in Plymouth, North Carolina.

Clark fought with the reserves under General Joseph E. Johnston at the Battle of Bentonville in March 1865. Johnston eventually surrendered his force to federal troops on April 26, and Clark was paroled on May 2 near High Point.

== Postwar activities ==
Following his parole, Clark returned home to Ventosa, finding it had been burned and pillaged by federal troops. He found his parents staying at their summer home, Airlie. His father crippled by illness, Clark assumed a leading role in his family and sought to rebuild its wealth. He assumed control over the remains of Ventosa as well as the Riverside plantation near New Bern. Low on money and deprived of an enslaved labor force, Clark relied on loans from his uncles and merchants in Norfolk and Baltimore to finance planting, offering crops as collateral. He also traveled to different cities to recruit new laborers, though without much success. In December 1865, he wrote two letters published by the Raleigh Sentinel which expressed his view that the South needed to move on from slavery and embrace industrialization and white labor.

In 1866, Clark moved to New York City to further his study of law. Unable to attend a law school, he found work in the law firm of Weeks and Foster and enrolled in night classes at Bryant & Stratton College. While there he frequented different museums, libraries, and churches. He later enrolled at Columbian Law School in Washington, D.C. and completed a legal course there. In January 1867, Clark was authorized to practice law in the courts of Halifax County, North Carolina, and opened a law office in Scotland Neck. Upon turning 21, he was formally licensed to practice law throughout the state. Two years later he joined with another attorney and moved his practice to the county seat of Halifax. Upon becoming a lawyer he sold the Riverside plantation but continued to manage Ventosa. In the following years he argued several cases before the North Carolina Supreme Court and, in 1870, he became a director of the Raleigh and Gaston Railroad.

Clark moved to Raleigh in 1873. He married Susan Washington Graham, daughter of former governor William Alexander Graham and Susannah Sarah Washington Graham, in January 1874. They had eight children together, half of whom died in infancy. While in Raleigh he joined with Thomas Michael Holt in purchasing a controlling interest in a newspaper, the Raleigh News, for which he wrote several editorials. He also became involved in politics and served on the executive committee of the North Carolina Democratic Party. He also authored Clark's Code of Civil Procedure on civil procedure in the state.

== Judicial career ==
In April 1885, Governor Alfred M. Scales appointed Clark a judge of the superior court, and in 1889, Gov. Daniel G. Fowle elevated him to the state Supreme Court. He was elected to the Supreme Court in 1890, and in 1894, was re-elected with the support of not only his own Democratic Party, but also that of the Republicans and Populists.

Clark was elected chief justice in 1902 and re-elected several times. In 1912, he unsuccessfully ran for the United States Senate as a liberal reformer against fellow Democrat Furnifold Simmons. Clark died in office in Raleigh on May 19, 1924. He was buried at Oakwood Cemetery.

== Legacy ==
Clark's five children attended North Carolina State University. They include Walter Clark, Jr., who is considered to be the youngest person to ever graduate from the university, and David Clark, who later served on the University of North Carolina Board of Trustees. Clark Dining Hall and David Clark Labs are named after Walter and David, respectively.

Legal offices
Preceded by David M. Furches	Chief Justice of North Carolina Supreme Court; 1903 - 1924	Succeeded by William A. Hoke

== Works cited ==
- Brooks, Aubrey Lee (1944). Walter Clark: Fighting Judge. Chapel Hill: The University of North Carolina Press.
