= Thomas D. Johnston =

American politician (1840–1902)

Member of the U.S. House of Representatives from North Carolina's 9th district
- In office March 4, 1885 – March 3, 1889
- Preceded by: District re-established
- Succeeded by: Hamilton G. Ewart

Member of the North Carolina Senate
- In office 1876

Member of the North Carolina House of Representatives
- In office 1870–1874

Mayor of Asheville, North Carolina
- In office 1869
- Preceded by: S. G. Kerr
- Succeeded by: M. E. Carter

Personal details
- Born: Thomas Dillard Johnston; April 1, 1840 Waynesville, North Carolina, U.S.
- Died: June 22, 1902 (aged 62) Asheville, North Carolina, U.S.
- Resting place: Riverside Cemetery
- Party: Democratic
- Education: University of North Carolina at Chapel Hill
- Occupation: Politician, lawyer

Military service
- Allegiance: Confederate States of America
- Branch/service: Confederate States Army

Thomas Dillard Johnston (April 1, 1840 – June 22, 1902) was a U.S. representative from North Carolina.

Born in Waynesville, Haywood County, North Carolina, April 1, 1840; attended the common schools and Col. Stephen Lee’s Preparatory School, Asheville, N.C.; entered the University of North Carolina at Chapel Hill in 1858, but left in the spring of 1859 on account of failing health; studied law; entered the Confederate Army in the spring of 1861; was admitted to the bar in 1867 and commenced practice in Asheville; mayor of Asheville in 1869; member of the State house of representatives 1870-1874; declined to be a candidate for reelection; served in the State senate in 1876; elected as a Democrat to the Forty-ninth and Fiftieth Congresses (March 4, 1885 – March 3, 1889); was an unsuccessful candidate for reelection in 1888 to the Fifty-first Congress; resumed the practice of law; died in Asheville, N.C., on June 22, 1902; interment in Riverside Cemetery.

== Sources ==
- United States Congress. "Thomas D. Johnston (id: J000199)". Biographical Directory of the United States Congress.

U.S. House of Representatives
Preceded by District re-established	Member of the U.S. House of Representatives from North Carolina's 9th congressional district 1885-1889	Succeeded by Hamilton G. Ewart
