= Green Hill Cemetery (Waynesville, North Carolina) =

Historic site in Haywood County, North Carolina

- U.S. National Register of Historic Places
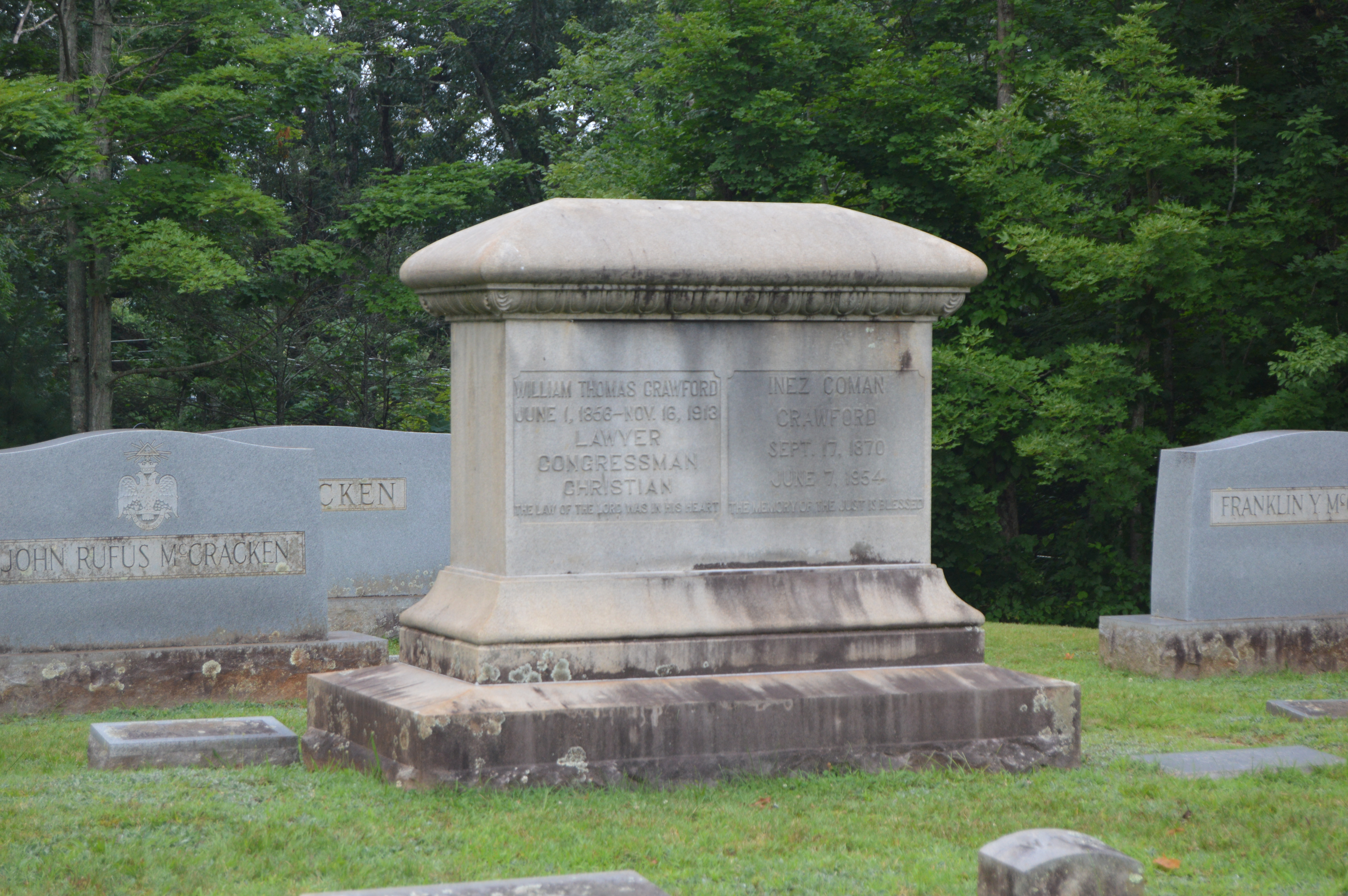
- William Thomas Crawford grave at Green Hill Cemetery

- Location within North Carolina
- Location: Golden Drive, Waynesville, North Carolina
- Coordinates: 35°29′1″N 82°59′27″W
- NRHP reference No.: 100000897
- Added to NRHP: June 1, 2018

Green Hill Cemetery is a historic cemetery located in Waynesville, North Carolina, where the town's first doctors, lawyers, politicians, preachers, and business people are buried. It is listed on the National Register of Historic Places. The cemetery is owned and operated by the Town of Waynesville.

Colonel James Robert Love, who donated the land and founded Waynesville and is a hero of the American Revolutionary War, is buried on the highest hill in the cemetery. The white chief of the Cherokee people, William Holland Thomas, is buried there. He was also the founder of Thomas' Legion, a group of local mountaineers and Cherokee who fought during the American Civil War in Kentucky, Virginia, Tennessee, and North Carolina. This placed the cemetery on the North Carolina Civil Wars Trail.

Some of the other notable pioneers are Congressmen James Moody and William T. Crawford and hotel owner and town promoter S. C. Satterthwaite. The cemetery hold the graves of individuals who succumbed to the Spanish flu of 1918. Buried there are five brothers who were Confederate soldiers that died during the American Civil War. William Greer, the chauffeur to five presidents, including John F. Kennedy on the day of his assassination, is buried at the cemetery.

Thomas Wolfe's father, William Oliver Wolfe, was a tombstone supplier and provided the cemetery's eight pieces of "funeral art", made of stone imported from Italy. An old mill stone was used in the grave marker for Barber's Orchard owner, R.N. Barber. There are other distinctive artistic grave markers in the cemetery. Local author and winner of the Pulitzer Prize for Fiction, Caroline Pafford Miller, is buried at Green Hill.
