= James M. Moody =

American politician

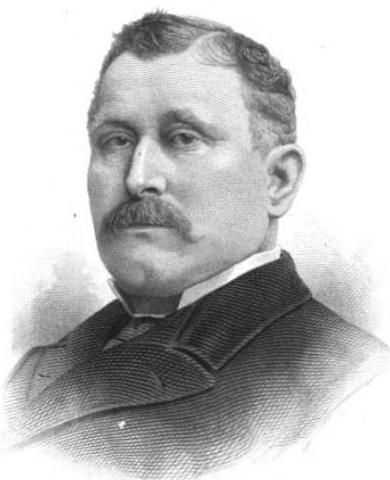
James M. Moody, US Representative from North Carolina

James Montraville Moody (February 12, 1858 – February 5, 1903) was a United States representative from North Carolina.

Moody was born near what is now Robbinsville, Graham (then Cherokee) County, North Carolina, February 12, 1858, and moved with his parents to Haywood County. He attended the common schools and Waynesville Academy, also Candler College, Buncombe County, North Carolina. He studied law and was admitted to the bar in 1881 and commenced practice in Waynesville, Haywood County, North Carolina.

He was a delegate to the Republican State conventions in 1888, 1892, 1896, and 1900 and to the Republican National Convention in 1896 and 1900. He served as prosecuting attorney of the twelfth judicial district of North Carolina 1886–1900. He was a member of the State senate 1894–1896.

During the Spanish–American War he served as major and chief commissary of United States Volunteers on the staff of brigadier general J. Warren Keifer. He was elected as a Republican to the Fifty-seventh United States Congress and served from March 4, 1901, until his death in Waynesville, North Carolina, February 5, 1903. His interment was in Green Hill Cemetery.

== See also ==
- List of members of the United States Congress who died in office (1900–1949)

Party political offices
Preceded by Jeter C. Pritchard	Republican nominee for Lieutenant Governor of North Carolina; 1892	Succeeded by Charles A. Reynolds
U.S. House of Representatives
Preceded by Richmond Pearson	Member of the U.S. House of Representatives from North Carolina's 9th congressional district 1901–1903	Succeeded by Edwin Y. Webb
