= James M. Gudger Jr. =

American politician (1855–1920)

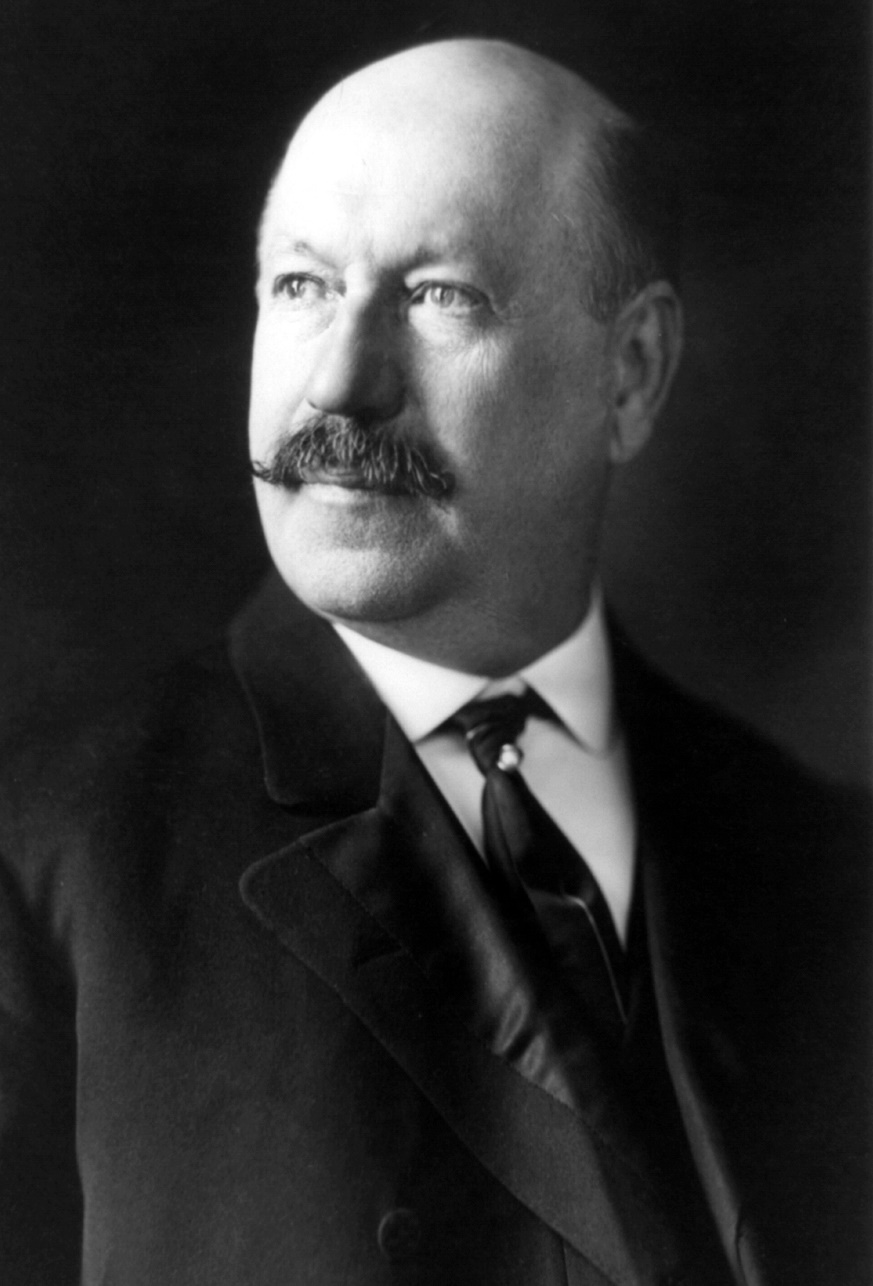
- Gudger c. 1912

Member of the U.S. House of Representatives from North Carolina's 10th district
- In office March 4, 1911 – March 3, 1915
- Preceded by: John Gaston Grant
- Succeeded by: James Jefferson Britt
- In office March 4, 1903 – March 3, 1907
- Preceded by: District re-established
- Succeeded by: William T. Crawford

Member of the North Carolina Senate
- In office 1900

Personal details
- Born: James Madison Gudger Jr. October 22, 1855 near Marshall, North Carolina, U.S.
- Died: February 29, 1920 (aged 64) Asheville, North Carolina, U.S.
- Resting place: Riverside Cemetery
- Party: Democratic
- Children: Katherine
- Occupation: Politician, lawyer

James Madison Gudger Jr. (October 22, 1855 – February 29, 1920) was an American lawyer and politician who served four terms as a U.S. representative from North Carolina from 1903 to 1907 and again from 1911 to 1915.

He was father of Katherine Gudger Langley.

== Biography ==
Born near Marshall, North Carolina, Gudger attended the common schools at Sand Hill, North Carolina, and Emory and Henry College, Emory, Virginia. He studied law in Pearson's Law School, Asheville, North Carolina. He was admitted to the bar and commenced practice in Marshall, North Carolina, in 1872. He served as member of the State senate in 1900. State solicitor of the sixteenth district in 1901 and 1902.

=== Congress ===
Gudger was elected as a Democrat to the Fifty-eighth and Fifty-ninth Congresses (March 4, 1903 – March 3, 1907). He resumed the practice of law at Asheville, North Carolina.

Gudger was elected to the Sixty-second and Sixty-third Congresses (March 4, 1911 – March 3, 1915). He served as chairman of the Committee on Expenditures in the Post Office Department (Sixty-third Congress). He was an unsuccessful candidate for reelection in 1914 to the Sixty-fourth Congress.

=== Later career and death ===
He again resumed the practice of his profession. He died in Asheville, North Carolina, February 29, 1920. He was interred in Riverside Cemetery.

== Sources ==
- United States Congress. "James M. Gudger Jr. (id: G000514)". Biographical Directory of the United States Congress.

U.S. House of Representatives
| Preceded by District re-established | Member of the U.S. House of Representatives from North Carolina's 10th congressional district 1903–1907 | Succeeded by William T. Crawford |
| Preceded by John G. Grant | Member of the U.S. House of Representatives from North Carolina's 10th congressional district 1911–1915 | Succeeded by James J. Britt |
