= Oakdale Cemetery (Hendersonville, North Carolina) =

Historic cemetery in Henderson County, North Carolina, US

- U.S. National Register of Historic Places
- U.S. Historic district
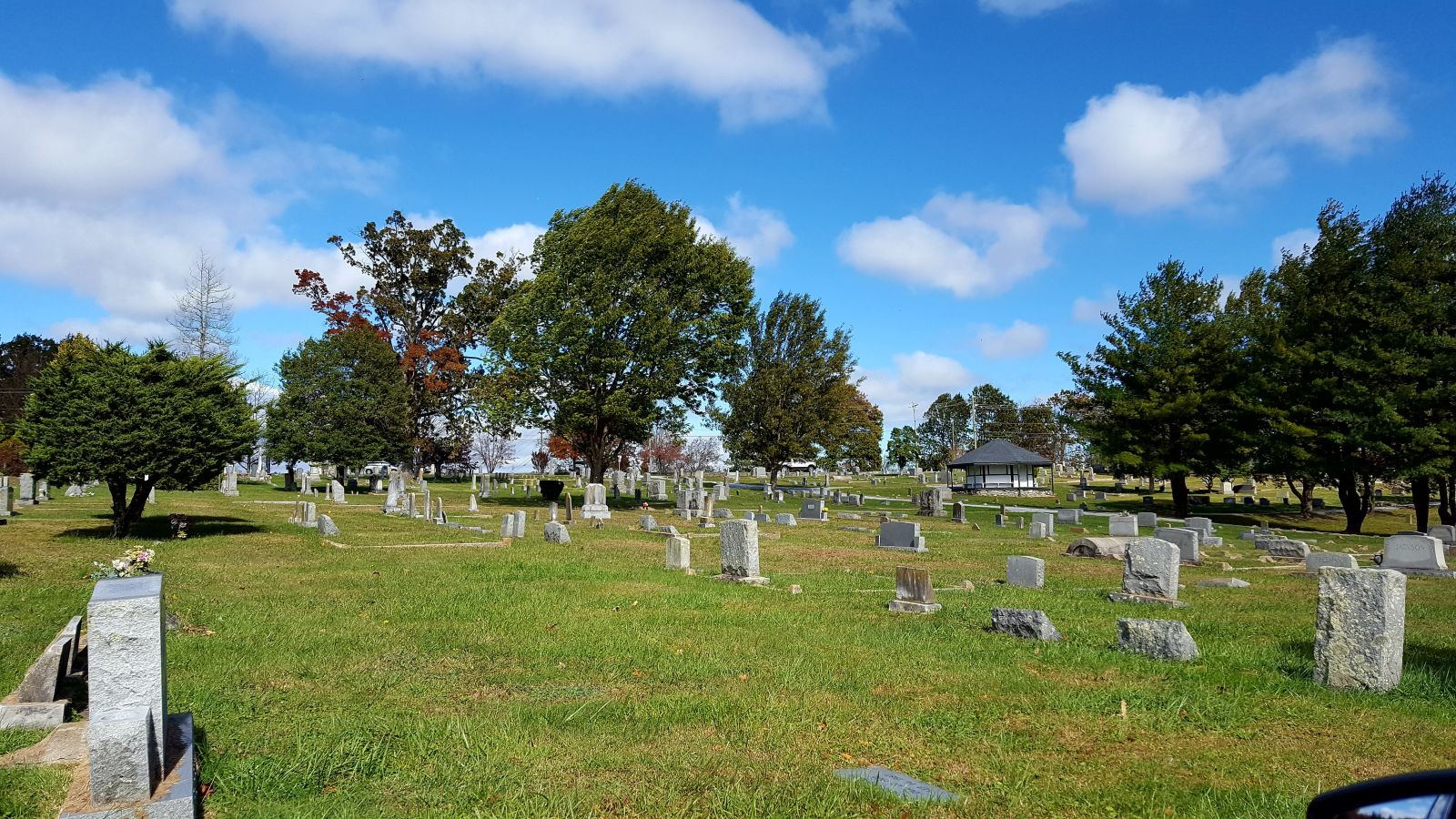
- 2017

- Location within North Carolina Location within the United States
- Location: N. & S. sides of 6th Ave., W., W. of Valley St., Hendersonville, North Carolina
- Coordinates: 35°19′11″N 82°28′27″W
- Area: 22 acres (8.9 ha)
- Built: 1885
- Built by: White, W. T.; Maunder and Campbell
- Architectural style: Late Victorian, Neoclassical
- NRHP reference No.: 13001158
- Added to NRHP: February 5, 2014

Oakdale Cemetery is a historic city cemetery and national historic district located at Hendersonville, Henderson County, North Carolina. It was established in 1885, and has approximately 5,400 burials. The property includes the original 1885 white section and 1885 African American section, along with a number of additions made into the 1950s. It includes a section for Agudas Israel Synagogue - Hendersonville's sole Jewish congregation. Historic contributing resources include the cemetery, a frame, octagonal pavilion dating from the turn of the 20th century; a 20th-century, rectangular brick mausoleum with a flat roof and terra cotta coping; a large Neoclassical concrete mausoleum, built in 1951; and a 1950s maintenance building. It includes the Italian marble angel statue which served as the inspiration for Thomas Wolfe's first novel, Look Homeward, Angel (1929).

It was listed on the National Register of Historic Places in 2014.

== Gallery ==
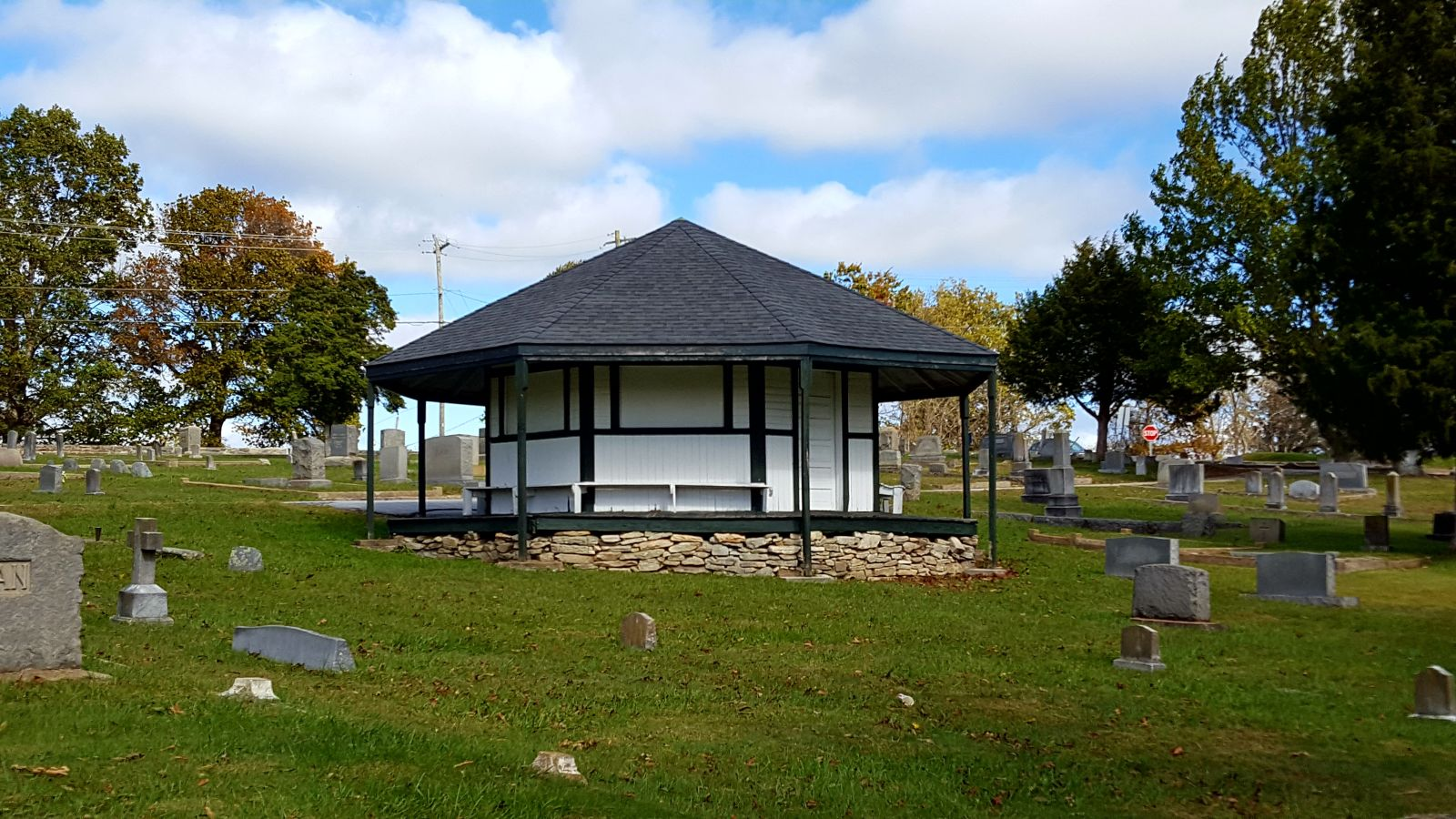
Pavillion, 2017

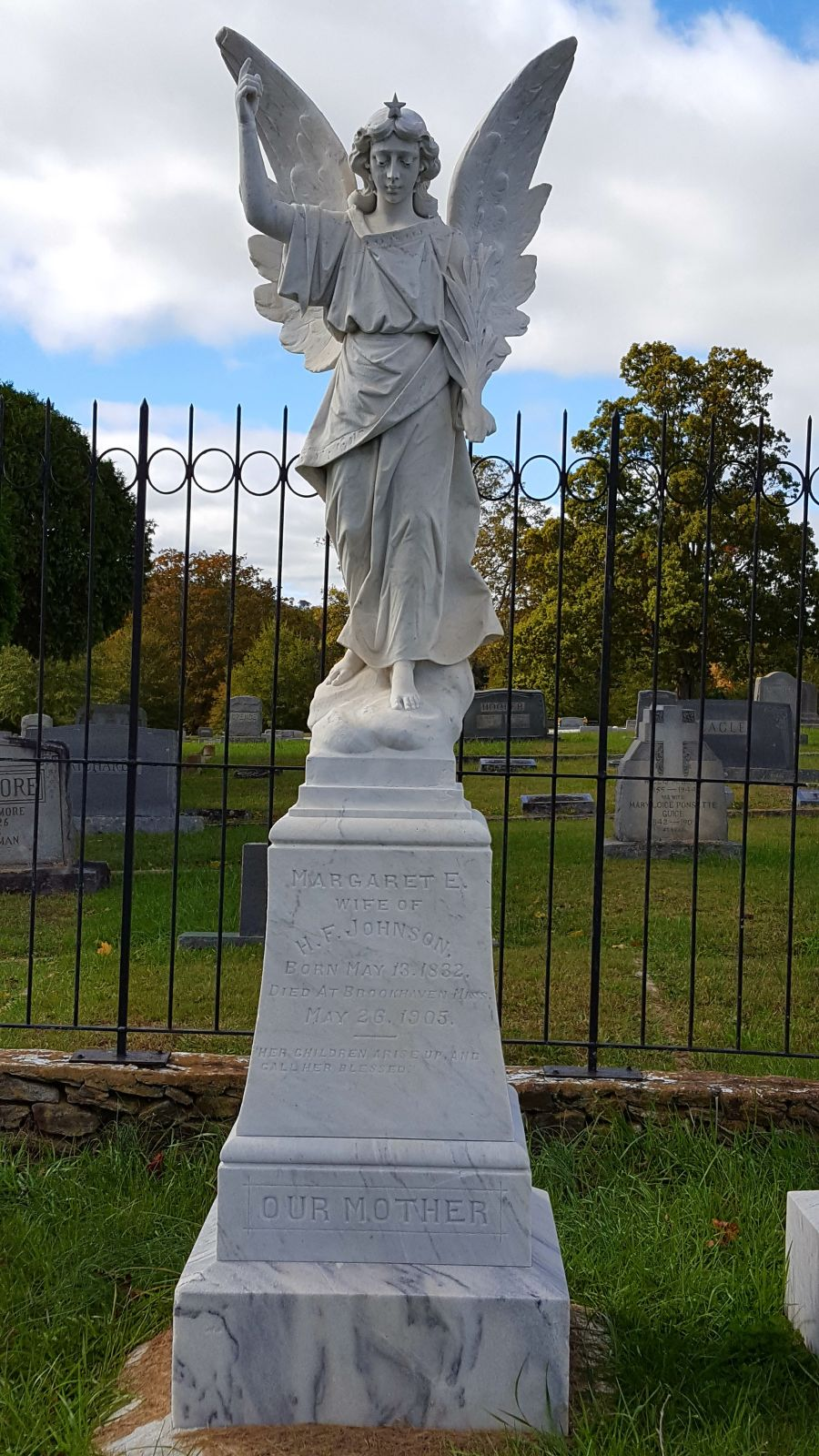
Statue that served as the inspiration of Look Homeward, Angel, 2017

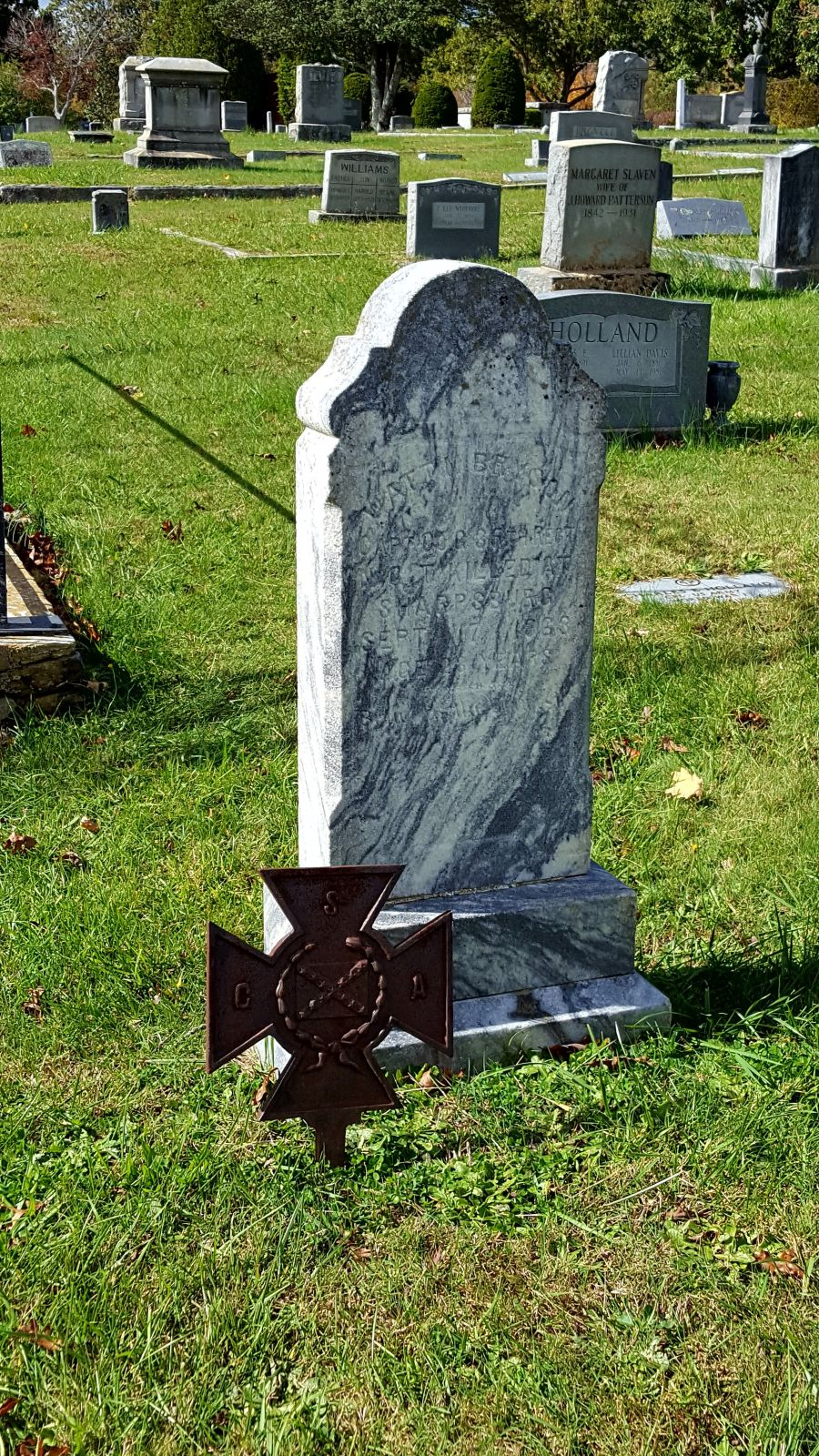
2017
