= Richmond Hill, North Carolina =

Richmond Hill
- Unincorporated community
- Location within the state of North Carolina
- Coordinates: 36°14′43″N 80°36′38″W
- Country: United States
- State: North Carolina
- County: Yadkin
- Elevation: 1,083 ft (330 m)
- Time zone: UTC-5 (Eastern (EST))
  - Summer (DST): UTC-4 (EDT)
- GNIS feature ID: 1022280

Richmond Hill is an unincorporated community in northern Yadkin County, North Carolina, United States, along the Yadkin River. The community is on the Yadkin County side of the river between the Surry County communities of Rockford and Siloam. It is located in the Boonville ZIP code area (27011).

== Overview ==
The community of Richmond Hill is named for the residence of the same name of Richmond Mumford Pearson, former Chief Justice of the North Carolina Supreme Court. Pearson established the Richmond Hill Law School in his home at Richmond Hill in 1848, which was conveniently near Rockford, then the county seat of a then combined Surry and Yadkin counties. The brick home of Pearson, built in 1861, was fully restored in the 1970s and is the centerpiece of the 30-acre (120,000 m^{2}) Richmond Hill Law School & Nature Park. It was listed on the National Register of Historic Places in 1970.

Richmond Hill Baptist, established in 1889, is also in the community.

The community was also home to New Creation Monastery, founded in 1994 by Father John Hoover, a former parish priest who lives as a Benedictine monk.
