= Edneyville, North Carolina =

- Census-designated place
- Location within North Carolina Location within the United States
- Coordinates: 35°24′09″N 82°20′14″W
- Country: United States
- State: North Carolina
- County: Henderson
- Named after: Samuel Edney

Area
  - Total: 10.75 sq mi (27.84 km^{2})
  - Land: 10.74 sq mi (27.81 km^{2})
  - Water: 0.0077 sq mi (0.02 km^{2})
- Elevation: 2,241 ft (683 m)

Population (2020)
  - Total: 2,395
  - Density: 223.0/sq mi (86.11/km^{2})
- Time zone: UTC-5 (Eastern (EST))
  - Summer (DST): UTC-4 (EDT)
- ZIP code: 28727
- Area code: 828
- GNIS feature ID: 2584316
- FIPS code: 37-20280

Edneyville is an unincorporated community and census-designated place (CDP) in Henderson County, North Carolina, United States. As of the 2020 census, Edneyville had a population of 2,395.

A post office called Edneyville has been in operation since 1828. Rev. Samuel Edney served as postmaster. He and his brother Asa were the two earliest settlers in the area. Samuel had 12 children and Asa had eight. Their descendants settled in the neighboring area, which led to the name Edneyville.

Since 1998 Edneyville is home of the North Carolina Justice Academy, a division of the North Carolina Department of Justice. The institution is currently located on the grounds and facilities of the former Edneyville High School.

== Geography ==
Edneyville is in northeastern Henderson County at an elevation of 2,246 feet (685 m) above sea level. The Eastern Continental Divide runs through the center of the CDP; the eastern side of the community drains via Reedypatch Creek to the Broad River, which flows through the Congaree and Santee River systems to the Atlantic Ocean, while the western side of the community drains to Clear Creek, which flows via Mud Creek to the French Broad River, then the Tennessee River, and finally the Mississippi River to the Gulf of Mexico.

U.S. Route 64 passes through Edneyville, leading southwest 9 miles (14 km) to Hendersonville and northeast 5 miles (8 km) to Bat Cave. Asheville is 25 miles (40 km) to the northwest via Terrys Gap Road.

According to the U.S. Census Bureau, the Edneyville CDP has a total area of 10.7 square miles (27.8 km^{2}), of which 0.01 square miles (0.02 km^{2}), or 0.08%, are water.

== Demographics ==
Historical population
Census	Pop.	Note	%±
2020	2,395		—
U.S. Decennial Census

=== 2020 census ===
As of the 2020 census, Edneyville had a population of 2,395. The median age was 40.9 years. 24.1% of residents were under the age of 18 and 16.8% of residents were 65 years of age or older. For every 100 females there were 103.5 males, and for every 100 females age 18 and over there were 99.2 males age 18 and over.

0.0% of residents lived in urban areas, while 100.0% lived in rural areas.

There were 923 households in Edneyville, of which 31.4% had children under the age of 18 living in them. Of all households, 46.2% were married-couple households, 20.3% were households with a male householder and no spouse or partner present, and 28.2% were households with a female householder and no spouse or partner present. About 27.0% of all households were made up of individuals and 12.4% had someone living alone who was 65 years of age or older.

There were 1,065 housing units, of which 13.3% were vacant. The homeowner vacancy rate was 2.1% and the rental vacancy rate was 7.5%.

Racial composition as of the 2020 census
Race	Number	Percent
White	1,816	75.8%
Black or African American	56	2.3%
American Indian and Alaska Native	10	0.4%
Asian	11	0.5%
Native Hawaiian and Other Pacific Islander	4	0.2%
Some other race	306	12.8%
Two or more races	192	8.0%
Hispanic or Latino (of any race)	526	22.0%
