= Richmond Mumford Pearson =

American judge (1805–1878)

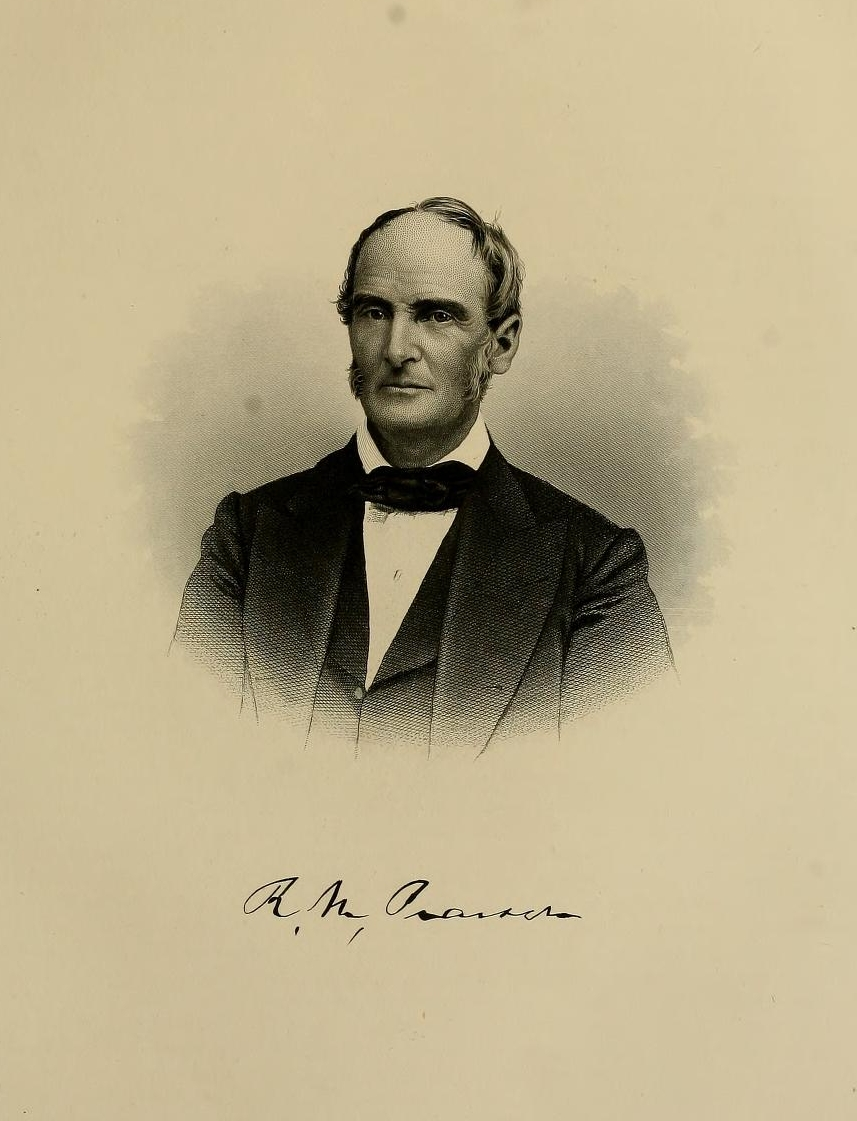

Chief Justice of the North Carolina Supreme Court
- In office 1859–1878
- Preceded by: Frederick Nash
- Succeeded by: William N. H. Smith

Personal details
- Born: June 28, 1805
- Died: January 5, 1878 (aged 72)
- Party: Whig; Republican
- Children: Richmond Pearson

Richmond Mumford Pearson (June 28, 1805 – January 5, 1878) was an American jurist who served as chief justice of the North Carolina Supreme Court from 1859 to 1878. He was the father of Congressman Richmond Pearson, grandfather of Major General Richmond P. Davis, and father-in-law of North Carolina Governor Daniel Gould Fowle.

Pearson lived much of his life in what is now Yadkin County, North Carolina and was a lawyer, state legislator, and Superior Court judge before being named by the state legislature as a Supreme Court associate judge in 1848. He was a prominent pro-Union Whig Party politician before the American Civil War and eventually became a Republican after the war.

As Chief Justice, the "domineering" Pearson helped the Court survive the Civil War, frequently ruling against the Confederacy on issues of exemption from conscription and habeas corpus, and saw it through the 1868 constitutional change that made the Court justices elected by popular vote, rather than by the General Assembly (legislature). Pearson had been serving for 10 years as chief justice by 1868 and was elected that year as the first popularly elected chief justice, nominated by both the Republican and Conservative (future Democratic) parties, though he soon after identified himself a Republican.

Pearson almost faced impeachment in 1870, after he was perceived by Democrats as acquiescing to Gov. William W. Holden's actions against the Ku Klux Klan. But the presence of many of Pearson's former students in the legislature is believed to have prevented him from being impeached. Instead, Pearson presided over Holden's impeachment trial, the only one in North Carolina history.

Pearson also started the Richmond Hill Law School in 1848 that lasted until 1878 in his Yadkin County estate called "Richmond Hill." The present day community of Richmond Hill in Yadkin County is named for the law school. Many of Pearson's students lived or worked across the Yadkin River in the village of Rockford in Surry County.

Legal offices
Preceded by Frederick Nash	Chief Justice of North Carolina Supreme Court; 1859–1878	Succeeded by William N. H. Smith
