= Thurmond and Lucy Chatham House =

Historic house in North Carolina, United States

- U.S. National Register of Historic Places
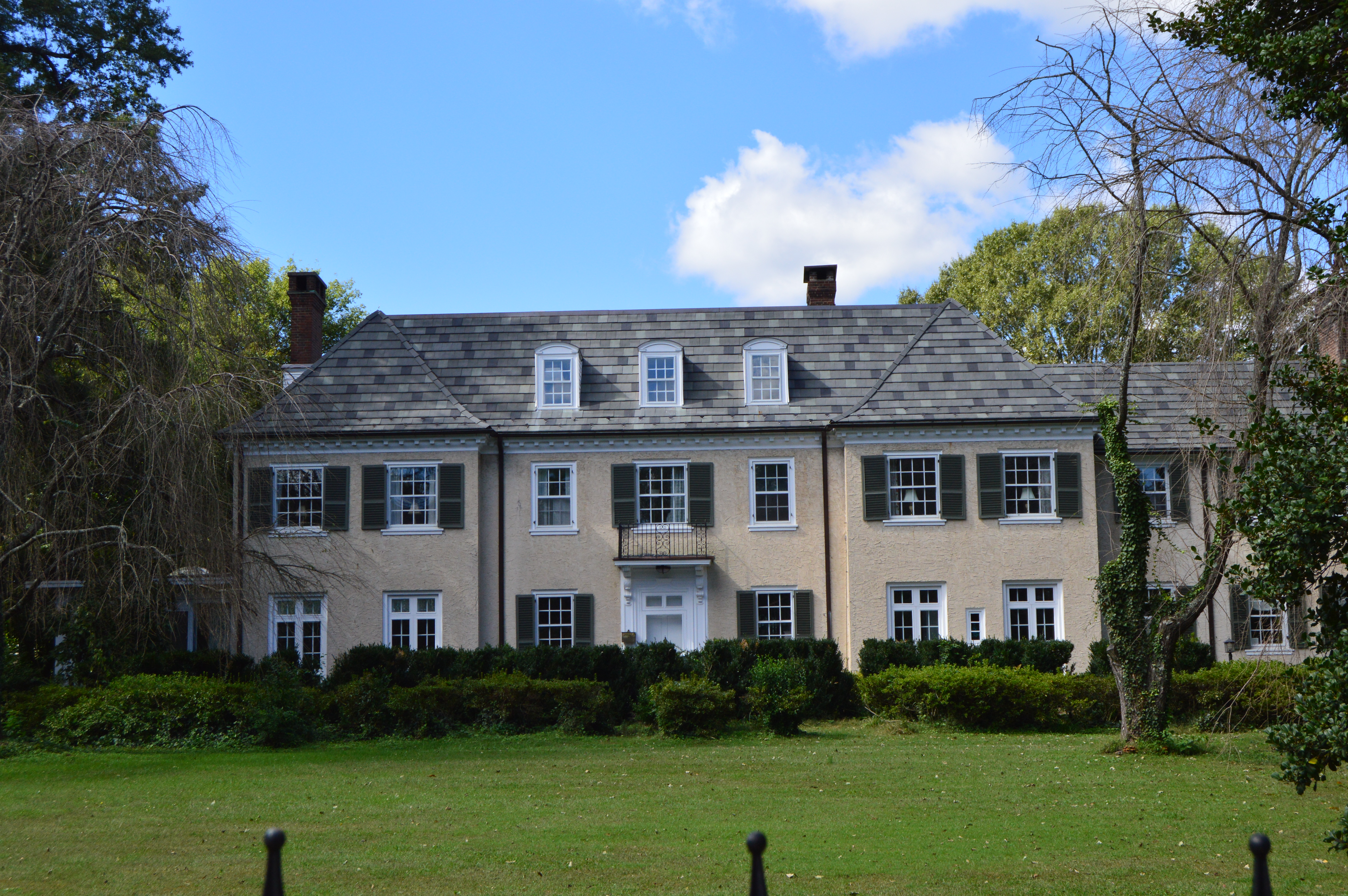
- Facade

- Location within North Carolina Location within the United States
- Location: 112 N. Stratford Rd., Winston-Salem, North Carolina
- Coordinates: 36°5′51″N 80°16′36″W
- Area: 2.72 acres (1.10 ha)
- Built: 1925
- Built by: McNeill Construction Company
- Architect: Keen and Wallace
- Architectural style: Classical Revival
- NRHP reference No.: 14000493
- Added to NRHP: August 18, 2014

The Thurmond and Lucy Chatham House is a historic home located at Winston-Salem, Forsyth County, North Carolina. It was built in 1925, and is a Classical Revival style stuccoed dwelling consisting of a 2 1/2-story main block flanked by two-bay-wide projecting hip-roofed sections. It has a tall hip roof and bluestone terrace that fills the rear courtyard of the H-shaped plan. The house encompasses 9,065-square-feet of living space. Also on the property is a contributing 1 1/2-story garage / apartment. It was built for Congressman and businessman Richard Thurmond Chatham (1896–1957), who also served as president of the Chatham Manufacturing Company and his wife, Lucy Hodgin Hanes.

It was listed on the National Register of Historic Places in 2014.
