= R. Thurmond Chatham =

American politician (1896–-1957)

Richard Thurmond Chatham
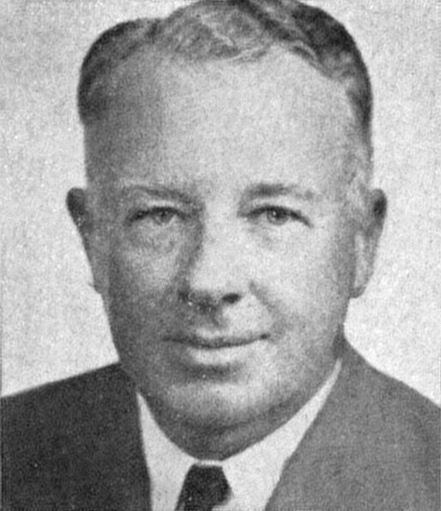

Member of the U.S. House of Representatives from North Carolina's 5th district
- In office January 3, 1949 – January 3, 1957
- Preceded by: John Hamlin Folger
- Succeeded by: Ralph James Scott

Personal details
- Born: August 16, 1896 Elkin, North Carolina, U.S.
- Died: February 5, 1957 (aged 60) Durham, North Carolina, U.S.
- Party: Democratic
- Spouse(s): Lucy Hodgin Hanes, Patricia Firestone
- Children: 3

Richard Thurmond Chatham (August 16, 1896 – February 5, 1957), who usually went by Thurmond Chatham, was an American industrialist, philanthropist and Democratic Party politician, who represented North Carolina in the U.S. House of Representatives from 1949 to 1957.

== Early life ==
Born in Elkin, North Carolina, Chatham was the only son of Hugh Gwyn Chatham and Martha Lenoir Chatham. His grandfather was Alexander Chatham, founder of Chatham Manufacturing Company. His other grandfather was R.J. Thurmond, who was a business associate of Colonel W.C. Falkner. The pair had a falling out, which culminated in Thurmond shooting Colonel Falkner dead outside of Thurmond's office in Ripley, Mississippi. Colonel Falkner was the great-grandfather of author William Faulkner, who referenced the shooting in his stories.

Chatham was educated in public schools and at Woodberry Forest School in Orange, Virginia. He attended the University of North Carolina from 1915–1916 and Yale University from 1916–1917, but left college to enter the United States Navy.

== Career ==
In July 1919, Chatham began working for his family's company, Chatham Manufacturing, which was the world's largest manufacturer of blankets. After serving as treasurer of the company, he became president in 1929 and chairman of the board of directors in 1945. During his presidency, the company experienced considerable growth in expansion in capacity and profits, as well as an increase in the variety of products.

=== Naval career ===
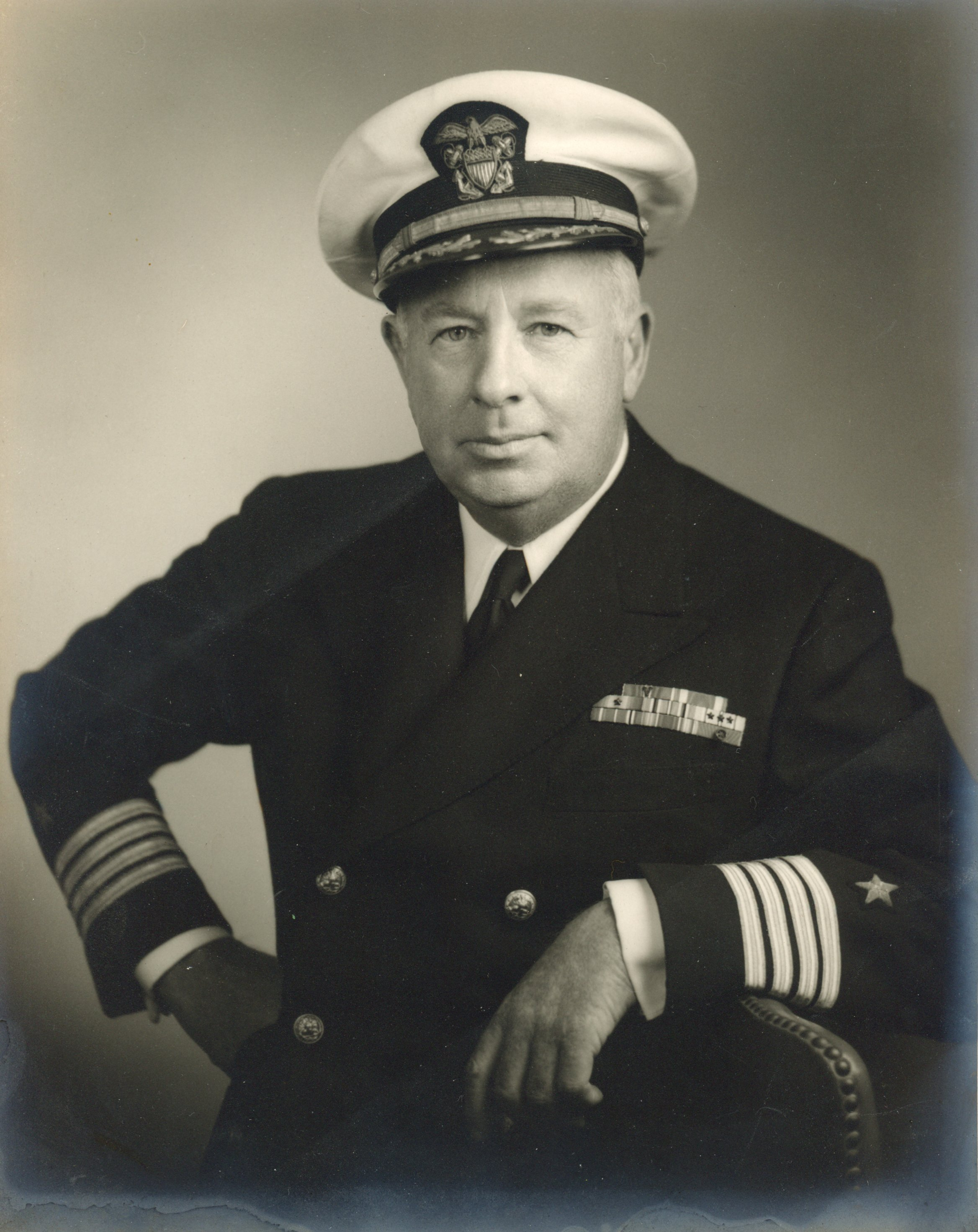
Commander Richard Thurmond Chatham

Chatham first entered the U.S. Navy as a seaman during World War I until he was discharged as an ensign in 1919. Afterwards, he served during World War II from February 1942 to November 1945, as an officer on the USS Phoenix (CL-46) in the Southwest Pacific and Atlantic. He fought in the New Guinea campaign, Battle of Cape Gloucester, Battle of Wakde, Admiralty Islands campaign and Battle of Hollandia. He worked with the Bureau of Ordnance and the office of the secretary of the navy, before being assigned to combat duty. He was named commander in the U.S. National Reserve, and was decorated with the Bronze Star Medal, the Secretary of the Navy's Commendation Medal, and the Royal Order of Orange-Nassau with Swords from the Dutch Government and earned the American Theater Ribbon, European Theater Ribbon, Asiatic Theater Ribbon with three battle stars, World War I Ribbon, and Victory Ribbon. He continued his service in the Naval Reserve, and in 1950 was appointed a Captain.

=== Political life ===
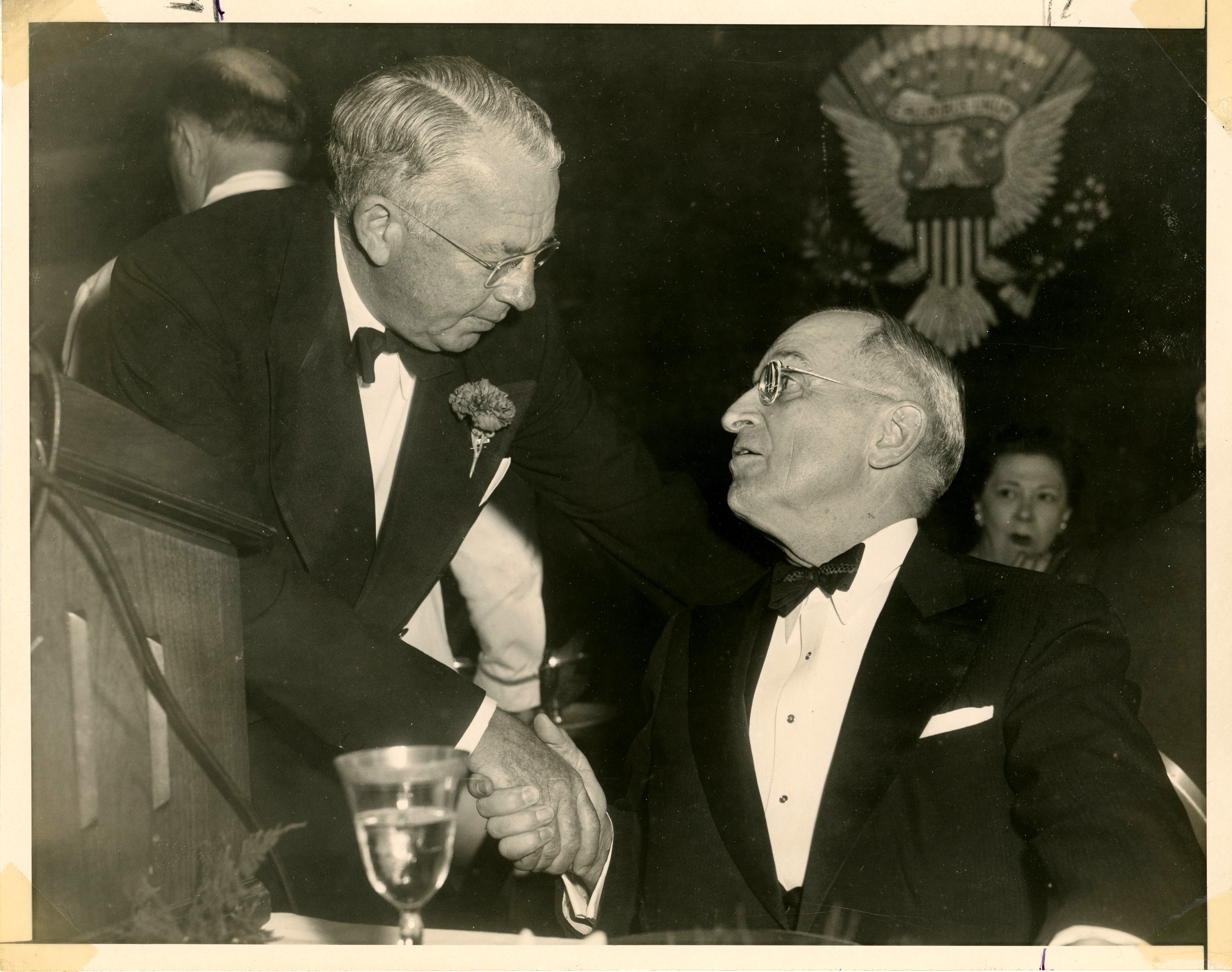
Chatham confers with President Truman

With his only previous political experience as a county commissioner in Forsyth County, North Carolina, Chatham was unsuccessful in his 1946 bid for the Democratic nomination for Congress. During the elections of 1948, Chatham proved that he was an active contributor of his party, and a strong supporter of President Harry S. Truman. He was first elected in 1948 and then re-elected for three more terms.

While in Congress, he was a member of the House Foreign Affairs Committee and was an advocate of recognition of China and support for the Marshall Plan.

Notably, he did not sign the 1956 Southern Manifesto despite school segregation being legally required in North Carolina prior to Brown v. Board of Education (1954). As a result, Chatham lost the Democratic Party primary to Ralph James Scott.

=== Later years ===
Chatham was a trustee of the University of North Carolina and of Woodberry Forest School; president of the Winston-Salem Chamber of Commerce; and a member of the National Association of Wool Manufacturers, the American Legion, and the Veterans of Foreign Wars. In 1948, he served on the North Carolina Board of Conservation and Development and was president of the North Carolina Dairymen's Association.

== Personal life ==
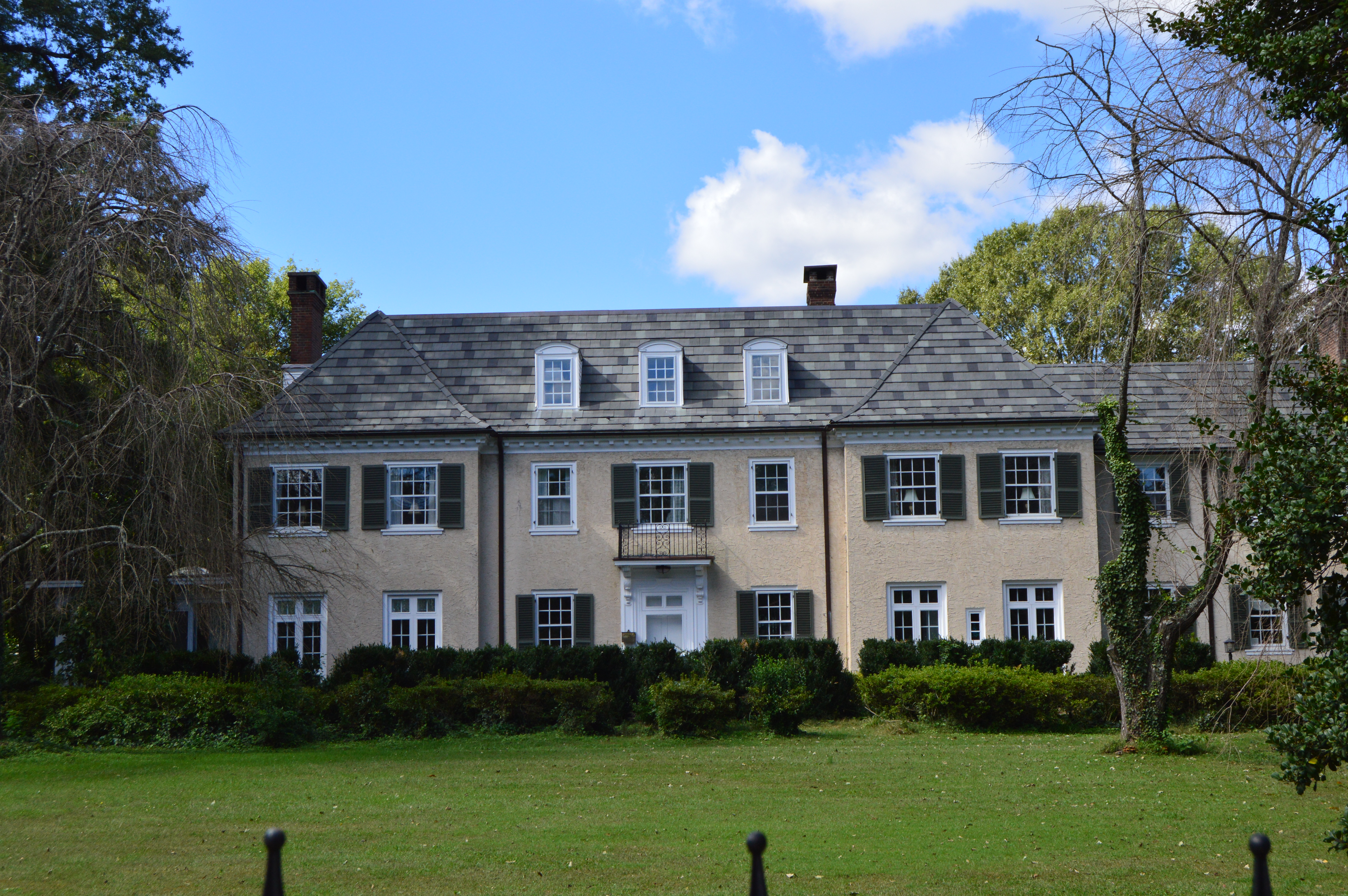
Chatham's Winston-Salem home

In 1919, Chatham married Lucy Hodgin Hanes (1895–1949), daughter of John Wesley Hanes. The couple had two sons, Hugh Gwyn II and Richard Thurmond, Jr. After Lucy died, Chatham married Patricia Firestone Coyner in 1950. In 1951 the couple purchased and remodeled Prospect House. The couple had one son, Walter Firestone, born in 1952. Chatham died in Durham, North Carolina and was buried in the Salem Cemetery in Winston-Salem, North Carolina. His estate was valued at almost $2,000,000, of which $250,000 was used to establish the Chatham Foundation, a charitable trust supporting education.

The Thurmond and Lucy Chatham House at Winston-Salem was listed on the National Register of Historic Places in 2014.

U.S. House of Representatives
Preceded by John H. Folger	Member of the U.S. House of Representatives from North Carolina's 5th congressional district 1949-1957	Succeeded by Ralph J. Scott
