= Franklin Wills Hancock Jr. =

American politician

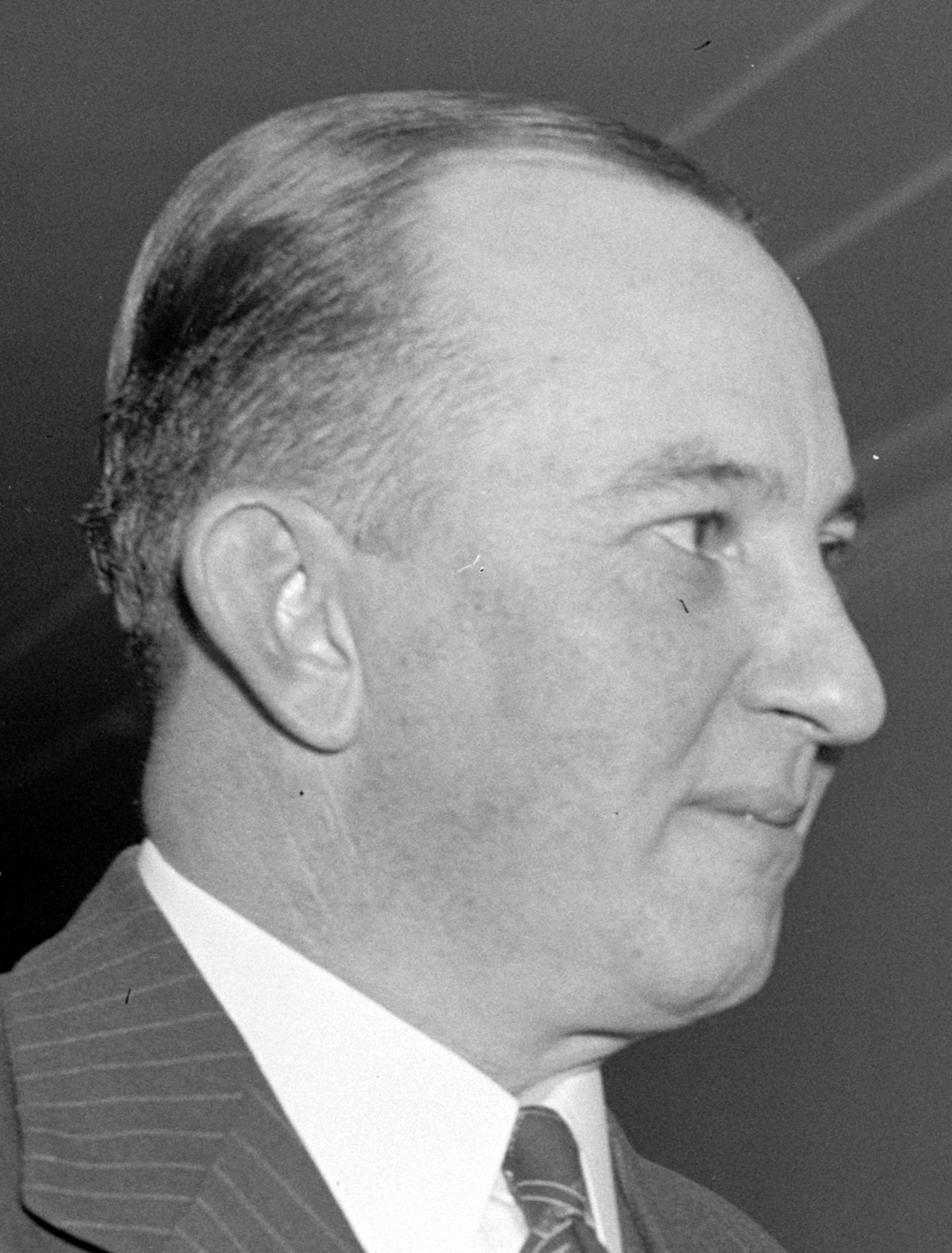

Member of the U.S. House of Representatives from North Carolina's 5th district
- In office November 4, 1930 – January 3, 1939
- Preceded by: Charles M. Stedman
- Succeeded by: Alonzo D. Folger

Personal details
- Born: Franklin Willis Hancock, Jr. November 1, 1894 Oxford, North Carolina, U.S.
- Died: January 23, 1969 (aged 74) Oxford, North Carolina, U.S.
- Resting place: Elmwood Cemetery
- Party: Democratic
- Spouse: Lucy Landis Hancock
- Children: 7
- Education: University of North Carolina at Chapel Hill
- Occupation: Lawyer

Frank Willis Hancock Jr. (November 1, 1894 – January 23, 1969) was a U.S. representative from North Carolina between 1930 and 1939 for the Democratic Party.

== Early life and education ==
Franklin Wills Hancock Jr. was born in Oxford, North Carolina, on November 1, 1894. He was the only son and one of four children of Franklin Wills and Lizzie Hobgood Hancock. His father was a descendant of William Hancock. (Note: Previous wiki-bio incorrectly stated that William is the brother of Declaration of Independence signer John Hancock - this is untrue as the only brother John had was Ebenezer. It is more likely that "William Hancock" is referencing either Captain William Hancock II of Neuse Settlement, the first Hancock to come to North Carolina, or his son William Hancock III, both of whom were members of the North Carolina colonial assembly).) He attended the local public schools and Horner Military Academy in Oxford. He then matriculated at the University of North Carolina at Chapel Hill, where he earned a law degree. He was admitted to the bar in 1916 and commenced practice in Oxford.

Hancock had additional business interests in insurance and real estate.

== World War I ==
During the First World War, he attended officers' training camp at Fort Oglethorpe, Georgia.

== Political career ==
He was chairman of the Granville County Democratic Executive Committee in 1924. He was then elected to the North Carolina State Senate and served in from 1926 to 1928. Afterwards, he was a member of the state House of Representatives from 1928 to 1930.

Hancock was also a trustee of the Colored Orphanage of North Carolina at Oxford from 1920 to 1937. In 1940, he was a delegate to the Democratic National Convention.

=== Congress ===
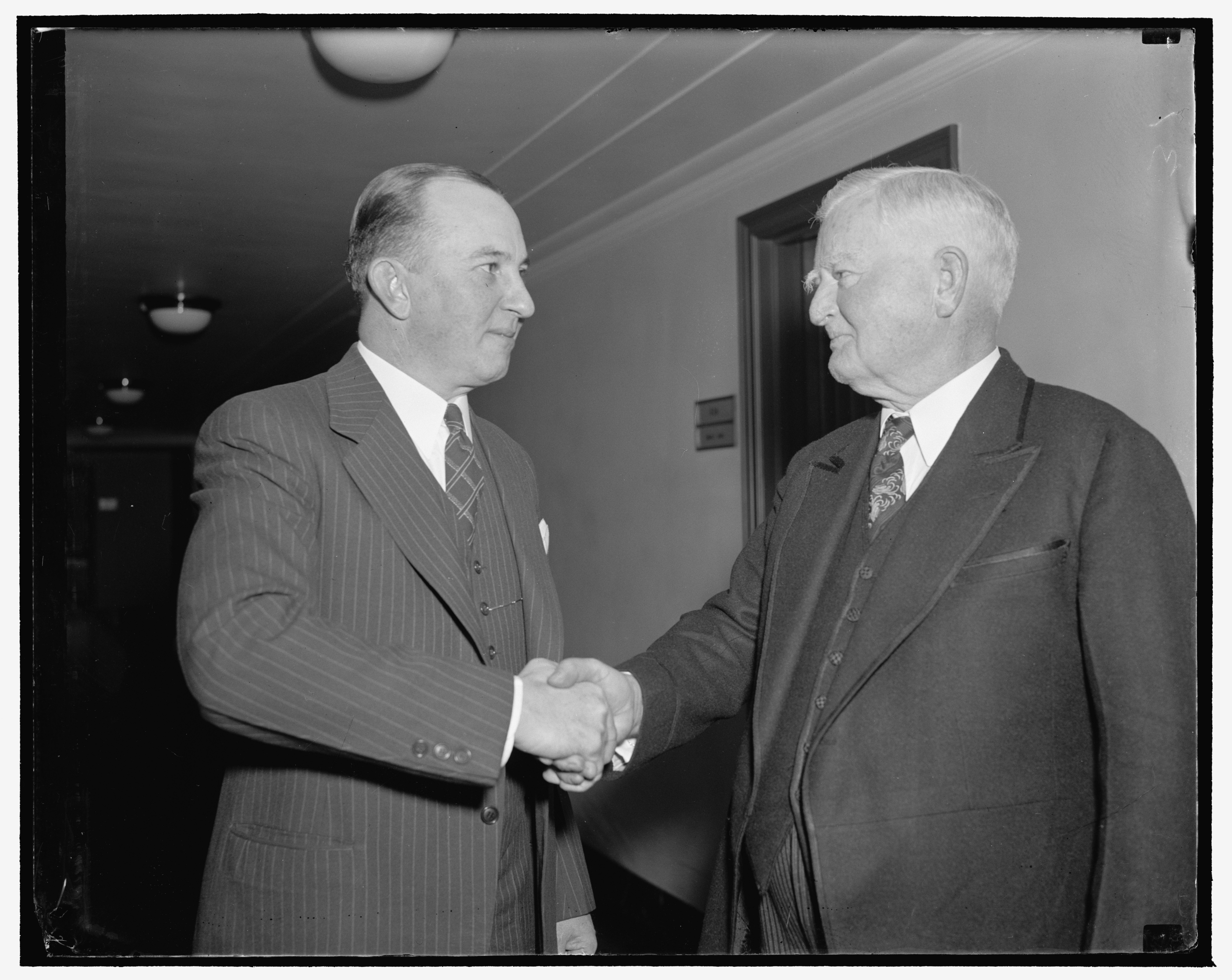
Hancock with Vice President John Nance Garner in 1939.

He was elected as a Democrat to the 71st U.S. Congress, filling the vacancy caused by the death of Charles M. Stedman. In a separate election on the same day, he was elected to the 72nd U.S. Congress. He was subsequently reelected to the three succeeding sessions of Congress, serving from November 4, 1930, to January 3, 1939. Hancock did not seek renomination in 1938 but was an unsuccessful candidate for the Democratic nomination for U.S. Senator that same year.

In 1938, Hancock was recruited by President Franklin D. Roosevelt to challenge incumbent Democratic senator Robert R. Reynolds in the Democratic primary. Hancock was unsuccessful, losing by a fairly wide margin.

While a member of Congress in the 1930s, Hancock supported passage of the Bankhead-Jones Farm Tenant Act, which provided low-interest loans to share-croppers and tenant farmers. The administration of these rural relief programs was located in the Farm Security Administration, which he would later be appointed to lead.

== Later career ==
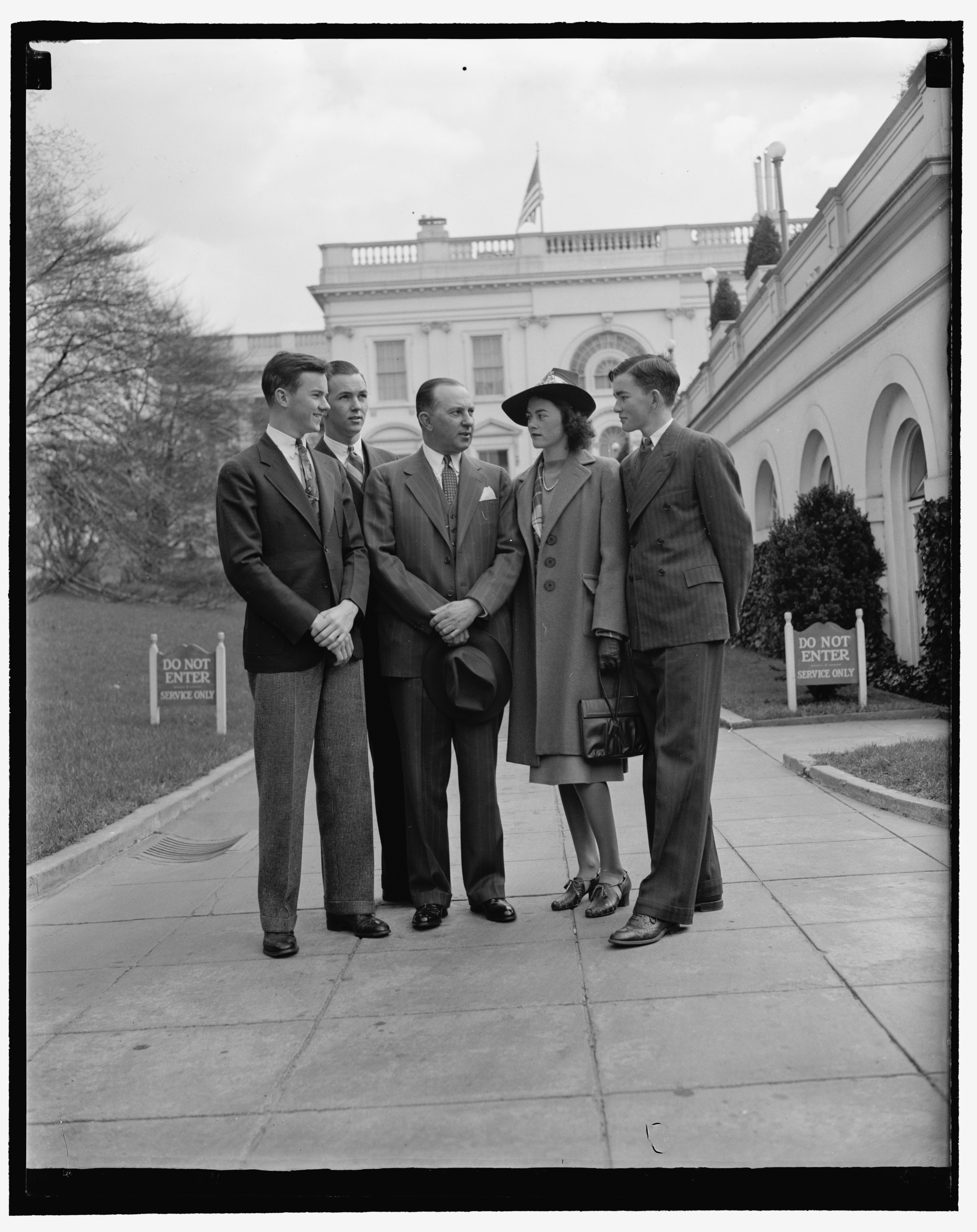
Congressman Frank Hancock at the White House with his children during the FDR Administration.

He later served in several posts in the Roosevelt administration. He was a member of the Federal Home Loan Bank Board from January 4, 1939, to April 24, 1942, and was appointed special representative of the Reconstruction Finance Corporation, serving until June 1943. He was also the administrator of the Farm Security Administration from November 1943 to November 1945. He was president of the Commodity Credit Corporation from December 1944 to August 1945, when he resumed the general practice of law at Oxford, North Carolina. He was elected judge of Granville County Recorder's Court in 1950 and 1952.

== Death ==
Frank W. Hancock Jr. died in Oxford, North Carolina, on January 23, 1969. His remains are interred in Elmwood Cemetery.

== Family ==
Hancock was married to Lucy Landis Hancock. The two had seven children, including Franklin W. Hancock III, who was a longtime member of the North Carolina legislature. F.W. Hancock III's granddaughter, Mary Wills Bode, was elected to the North Carolina Senate in 2022.

F.W. Hancock Jr.’s grandson, Richard Hancock Moore, served two terms as North Carolina State Treasurer (2001–2009) and was a candidate for Governor in 2008, but lost the Democratic primary to Bev Perdue.

U.S. House of Representatives
Preceded by Charles M. Stedman	Member of the U.S. House of Representatives from North Carolina's 5th congressional district November 4, 1930 – January 3, 1939	Succeeded by Alonzo D. Folger
