= Ralph James Scott =

American politician

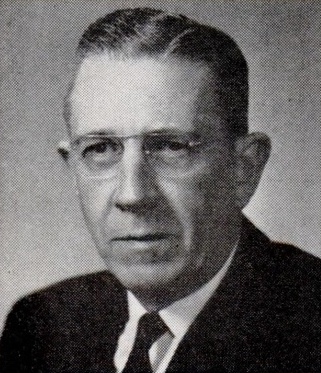

Member of the U.S. House of Representatives from North Carolina's 5th district
- In office January 3, 1957 – January 3, 1967
- Preceded by: Richard T. Chatham
- Succeeded by: Nick Galifianakis

Member of the North Carolina House of Representatives from Stokes County
- In office 1937–1939
- Preceded by: S. Gilmer Sparger
- Succeeded by: William F. Marshall

Personal details
- Born: October 15, 1905 near Pinnacle, North Carolina, U.S.
- Died: August 5, 1983 (aged 77) Danbury, North Carolina, U.S.
- Party: Democratic
- Education: Wake Forest University
- Occupation: lawyer

Ralph James Scott (October 15, 1905 – August 5, 1983) was a Democratic U.S. Representative from North Carolina between 1957 and 1967.

== Biography ==
Born near Pinnacle, North Carolina in Surry County, Scott attended public schools and then Wake Forest University, where he studied law. He was admitted to the bar in 1930 and practiced in Danbury, North Carolina.

Scott was elected to the North Carolina House of Representatives in 1936, serving for one term, and was a delegate to state Democratic Party conventions from 1936 to 1968. He chaired the Executive Committee of the Stokes County, North Carolina Democratic Party from 1936 to 1970, during that time serving as the solicitor of the twenty-first judicial district of North Carolina (1938–1956) and a member of the U.S. House of Representatives (for five terms, serving (January 3, 1957 – January 3, 1967).

Scott did not stand for election to a sixth term in 1966 and returned to his law practice; he lived in Danbury until his 1983 death, and is buried in the Pinnacle Baptist Church cemetery.

U.S. House of Representatives
Preceded by Richard T. Chatham	Member of the U.S. House of Representatives from North Carolina's 5th congressional district 1957-1967	Succeeded by Nick Galifianakis
