= North Carolina's 5th congressional district =

U.S. House district for North Carolina

Coordinates: 36.23°N 81.08°W

- Interactive map of district boundaries since January 3, 2025 (Note: As the mid-decade redistricting bill (S249) enacted on October 22, 2025 only changed the compositions of North Carolina's 1st and 3rd congressional districts, boundaries of other districts will not change at the 2026 elections.)
- Representative: Virginia Foxx; R–Banner Elk
- Population (2025): 769,682
- Median household income: $66,919
- Ethnicity: 68.0% White; 17.7% Black; 7.9% Hispanic; 3.4% Two or more races; 2.2% Asian; 0.7% other
- Cook PVI: R+9

North Carolina's 5th congressional district covers the central western portion of North Carolina from the Appalachian Mountains to the northern suburbs of the Piedmont Triad as well as the bulk of the city of Greensboro. The district borders Tennessee and Virginia, with the bulk of its territory in the mountains; it stretches just far enough to the east to grab most of Greensboro.

The district is overwhelmingly Republican. Large portions were controlled by Republicans even during the "Solid South" era as much of northwestern North Carolina was Quaker or mountaineer and therefore resisted secession. Wilkes County has never voted for the Democratic Party before the Second Party System. For the 2024 election the district has been updated per Senate Bill 757 enacted by the NC General Assembly on October 25, 2023, becoming Session Law 2023–145. District boundaries are based on 2020 census tabulation blocks.

The fifth district is currently represented by Virginia Foxx, a Republican.

== Counties and communities ==
For the 119th and successive Congresses (based on the districts drawn following a 2023 legislative session), the district contains all or portions of the following counties and communities.

Alexander County (4)

All four communities

Alleghany County (1)

Sparta

Ashe County (3)

All three communities

Caldwell County (10)

All ten communities

Guilford County (5)

Greensboro (part; also 6th and 9th), Kernersville (part; also 6th; shared with Forsyth County), Oak Ridge, Stokesdale, Summerfield (part; also 9th)

Rockingham County (8)

All eight communities

Stokes County (7)

All seven communities

Surry County (8)

All eight communities

Watauga County (7)

All seven communities

Wilkes County (11)

All 11 communities

== Recent election results from statewide races ==
Year	Office	Results
2008	President	McCain 51% - 47%
2008	Senate	Hagan 52% - 44%
2008	Governor	Perdue 50% - 47%
2010	Senate	Burr 58% - 40%
2012	President	Romney 54% - 46%
2012	Governor	McCrory 58% - 40%
2014	Senate	Tillis 52% - 44%
2016	President	Trump 55% - 41%
2016	Senate	Burr 56% - 41%
2016	Governor	McCrory 52% - 46%
2016	Lt. Governor	Forest 56% - 41%
2016	Secretary of State	LaPaglia 51% - 49%
2016	Auditor	Stuber 54% - 46%
2016	Treasurer	Folwell 57% - 43%
2016	Attorney General	Newton 53% - 47%
2020	President	Trump 57% - 42%
2020	Senate	Tillis 54% - 41%
2020	Governor	Forest 53% - 46%
2020	Lt. Governor	Robinson 58% - 42%
2020	Secretary of State	Sykes 55% - 45%
2020	Auditor	Street 56% - 44%
2020	Treasurer	Folwell 58% - 42%
2020	Attorney General	O'Neill 56% - 44%
2022	Senate	Budd 58% - 40%
2024	President	Trump 58% - 41%
2024	Governor	Stein 48% - 47%
2024	Lt. Governor	Weatherman 55% - 42%
2024	Secretary of State	Brown 56% - 44%
2024	Auditor	Boliek 56% - 41%
2024	Treasurer	Briner 59% - 41%
2024	Attorney General	Bishop 55% - 45%

== List of members representing the district ==
Member (Residence)	Party	Years	Cong ress	Electoral history	District location
District established June 16, 1790
John Sevier (Southwest Territory)	Pro-Administration	June 16, 1790 – March 3, 1791	1st	Elected in 1790. District ceded by the state to the Federal government in 1789 but permitted to serve anyway although he wasn't representing any part of a state.	1790–1791 "Western division"
William B. Grove (Fayetteville)	Pro-Administration	March 4, 1791 – March 3, 1793	2nd	Elected in 1791. Redistricted to the 7th district after original district ceded to federal government to later become Tennessee.	1791–1793 "Cape Fear division"
Nathaniel Macon (Warrenton)	Anti-Administration	March 4, 1793 – March 3, 1795	3rd 4th 5th 6th 7th	Redistricted from the 2nd district and re-elected in 1793. Re-elected in 1795. Re-elected in 1796. Re-elected in 1798. Re-elected in 1800. Redistricted to the 6th district.	1793–1803 [data missing]
Nathaniel Macon (Warrenton)	Democratic-Republican	March 4, 1795 – March 3, 1803	3rd 4th 5th 6th 7th	Redistricted from the 2nd district and re-elected in 1793. Re-elected in 1795. Re-elected in 1796. Re-elected in 1798. Re-elected in 1800. Redistricted to the 6th district.	1793–1803 [data missing]
James Gillespie (Kenansville)	Democratic-Republican	March 4, 1803 – March 3, 1805	8th	Elected in 1803. Re-elected in 1804. Died.	1803–1813 "North Carolina congressional district map (1803–13)".
Thomas Kenan (Kenansville)	Democratic-Republican	March 4, 1805 – March 3, 1811	9th 10th 11th	Elected August 8, 1805 to begin Gillespie's term. Re-elected in 1806. Re-elected in 1808. Retired.	1803–1813 "North Carolina congressional district map (1803–13)".
William R. King (Wilmington)	Democratic-Republican	March 4, 1811 – November 4, 1816	12th 13th 14th	Elected in 1810. Re-elected in 1813. Re-elected in 1815. Resigned.	1803–1813 "North Carolina congressional district map (1803–13)".
William R. King (Wilmington)	Democratic-Republican	March 4, 1811 – November 4, 1816	12th 13th 14th	Elected in 1810. Re-elected in 1813. Re-elected in 1815. Resigned.	1813–1823 "North Carolina congressional district map (1813–43)".
Vacant		November 4, 1816 – December 2, 1816	14th		1813–1823 "North Carolina congressional district map (1813–43)".
Charles Hooks (Dublin)	Democratic-Republican	December 2, 1816 – March 3, 1817	14th	Elected to finish King's term. Lost re-election.	1813–1823 "North Carolina congressional district map (1813–43)".
James Owen (Elizabethtown)	Democratic-Republican	March 4, 1817 – March 3, 1819	15th	Elected in 1817. Lost re-election.	1813–1823 "North Carolina congressional district map (1813–43)".
Charles Hooks (Dublin)	Democratic-Republican	March 4, 1819 – March 3, 1823	16th 17th 18th	Elected in 1819. Re-elected in 1821. Re-elected in 1823. Lost re-election.	1813–1823 "North Carolina congressional district map (1813–43)".
Charles Hooks (Dublin)	Democratic-Republican	March 4, 1823 – March 3, 1825	16th 17th 18th	Elected in 1819. Re-elected in 1821. Re-elected in 1823. Lost re-election.	1823–1833 "North Carolina congressional district map (1813–43)".
Gabriel Holmes (Clinton)	Jacksonian	March 4, 1825 – September 26, 1829	19th 20th 21st	Elected in 1825. Re-elected in 1827. Re-elected in 1829. Died.	1823–1833 "North Carolina congressional district map (1813–43)".
Vacant		September 26, 1829 – November 10, 1829	21st		1823–1833 "North Carolina congressional district map (1813–43)".
Edward B. Dudley (Wilmington)	Jacksonian	November 10, 1829 – March 3, 1831	21st	Elected November 10, 1829 to finish Holmes's term and seated December 14, 1829. [data missing]	1823–1833 "North Carolina congressional district map (1813–43)".
James I. McKay (Elizabethtown)	Jacksonian	March 4, 1831 – March 3, 1837	22nd 23rd 24th 25th 26th 27th	Elected in 1831. Re-elected in 1833. Re-elected in 1835. Re-elected in 1837. Re-elected in 1839. Re-elected in 1841. Redistricted to the 6th district.	1823–1833 "North Carolina congressional district map (1813–43)".
James I. McKay (Elizabethtown)	Jacksonian	March 4, 1831 – March 3, 1837	22nd 23rd 24th 25th 26th 27th	Elected in 1831. Re-elected in 1833. Re-elected in 1835. Re-elected in 1837. Re-elected in 1839. Re-elected in 1841. Redistricted to the 6th district.	1833–1843 "North Carolina congressional district map (1813–43)".
James I. McKay (Elizabethtown)	Democratic	March 4, 1837 – March 3, 1843	22nd 23rd 24th 25th 26th 27th	Elected in 1831. Re-elected in 1833. Re-elected in 1835. Re-elected in 1837. Re-elected in 1839. Re-elected in 1841. Redistricted to the 6th district.	1833–1843 "North Carolina congressional district map (1813–43)".
Romulus M. Saunders (Raleigh)	Democratic	March 4, 1843 – March 3, 1845	28th	Redistricted from the 8th district and re-elected in 1843. [data missing]	1843–1853 [data missing]
James C. Dobbin (Fayetteville)	Democratic	March 4, 1845 – March 3, 1847	29th	Elected in 1845. [data missing]	1843–1853 [data missing]
Abraham W. Venable (Bronwsville)	Democratic	March 4, 1847 – March 3, 1853	30th 31st 32nd	Elected in 1847. Re-elected in 1849. Re-elected in 1851. [data missing]	1843–1853 [data missing]
John Kerr Jr. (Yanceyville)	Whig	March 4, 1853 – March 3, 1855	33rd	Elected in 1853. [data missing]	1853–1861 [data missing]
Edwin G. Reade (Roxboro)	Know Nothing	March 4, 1855 – March 3, 1857	34th	Elected in 1855. [data missing]	1853–1861 [data missing]
John A. Gilmer (Greensboro)	Know Nothing	March 4, 1857 – March 3, 1859	35th 36th	Elected in 1857. Re-elected in 1859. [data missing]	1853–1861 [data missing]
John A. Gilmer (Greensboro)	Opposition	March 4, 1859 – March 3, 1861	35th 36th	Elected in 1857. Re-elected in 1859. [data missing]	1853–1861 [data missing]
Vacant		March 3, 1861 – July 20, 1868	36th 37th 38th 39th 40th	Civil War and Reconstruction	
Israel G. Lash (Salem)	Republican	July 20, 1868 – March 3, 1871	40th 41st	Elected to finish the short term. Re-elected in 1868. [data missing]	1868–1873 [data missing]
James M. Leach (Lexington)	Democratic	March 4, 1871 – March 3, 1875	42nd 43rd	Elected in 1870. Re-elected in 1872. [data missing]	1868–1873 [data missing]
James M. Leach (Lexington)	Democratic	March 4, 1871 – March 3, 1875	42nd 43rd	Elected in 1870. Re-elected in 1872. [data missing]	1873–1883 [data missing]
Alfred M. Scales (Greensboro)	Democratic	March 4, 1875 – December 30, 1884	44th 45th 46th 47th 48th	Elected in 1874. Re-elected in 1876. Re-elected in 1878. Re-elected in 1880. Re-elected in 1882. Re-elected in 1884. Resigned when elected governor of North Carolina.	1873–1883 [data missing]
Alfred M. Scales (Greensboro)	Democratic	March 4, 1875 – December 30, 1884	44th 45th 46th 47th 48th	Elected in 1874. Re-elected in 1876. Re-elected in 1878. Re-elected in 1880. Re-elected in 1882. Re-elected in 1884. Resigned when elected governor of North Carolina.	1883–1893 [data missing]
Vacant		December 30, 1884 – January 28, 1885	48th		1883–1893 [data missing]
James W. Reid (Wentworth)	Democratic	January 28, 1885 – December 31, 1886	48th 49th	Elected to finish Scales's term. Resigned.	1883–1893 [data missing]
Vacant		December 31, 1886 – March 3, 1887	49th		1883–1893 [data missing]
John M. Brower (Mount Airy)	Republican	March 4, 1887 – March 3, 1891	50th 51st	Elected in 1886. Re-elected in 1888. [data missing]	1883–1893 [data missing]
Archibald H. A. Williams (Oxford)	Democratic	March 4, 1891 – March 3, 1893	52nd	Elected in 1890. [data missing]	1883–1893 [data missing]
Thomas Settle III (Reidsville)	Republican	March 4, 1893 – March 3, 1897	53rd 54th	Elected in 1892. Re-elected in 1894. [data missing]	1893–1903 [data missing]
William W. Kitchin (Roxboro)	Democratic	March 4, 1897 – January 11, 1909	55th 56th 57th 58th 59th 60th	Elected in 1896. Re-elected in 1898. Re-elected in 1900. Re-elected in 1902. Re-elected in 1904. Re-elected in 1906. Resigned when elected governor of North Carolina.	1893–1903 [data missing]
William W. Kitchin (Roxboro)	Democratic	March 4, 1897 – January 11, 1909	55th 56th 57th 58th 59th 60th	Elected in 1896. Re-elected in 1898. Re-elected in 1900. Re-elected in 1902. Re-elected in 1904. Re-elected in 1906. Resigned when elected governor of North Carolina.	1903–1913 [data missing]
Vacant		January 11, 1909 – March 3, 1909	60th		1903–1913 [data missing]
John M. Morehead (Spray)	Republican	March 4, 1909 – March 3, 1911	61st	Elected in 1908. [data missing]	1903–1913 [data missing]
Charles M. Stedman (Greensboro)	Democratic	March 4, 1911 – September 23, 1930	62nd 63rd 64th 65th 66th 67th 68th 69th 70th 71st	Elected in 1910. Re-elected in 1912. Re-elected in 1914. Re-elected in 1916. Re-elected in 1918. Re-elected in 1920. Re-elected in 1922. Re-elected in 1924. Re-elected in 1926. Re-elected in 1928. Died.	1903–1913 [data missing]
Charles M. Stedman (Greensboro)	Democratic	March 4, 1911 – September 23, 1930	62nd 63rd 64th 65th 66th 67th 68th 69th 70th 71st	Elected in 1910. Re-elected in 1912. Re-elected in 1914. Re-elected in 1916. Re-elected in 1918. Re-elected in 1920. Re-elected in 1922. Re-elected in 1924. Re-elected in 1926. Re-elected in 1928. Died.	1913–1933 [data missing]
Vacant		September 23, 1930 – November 4, 1930	71st		1913–1933 [data missing]
Franklin W. Hancock Jr. (Oxford)	Democratic	November 4, 1930 – January 3, 1939	71st 72nd 73rd 74th 75th	Elected to finish Stedman's term. Re-elected in 1930. Re-elected in 1932. Re-elected in 1934. Re-elected in 1936. [data missing]	1913–1933 [data missing]
Franklin W. Hancock Jr. (Oxford)	Democratic	November 4, 1930 – January 3, 1939	71st 72nd 73rd 74th 75th	Elected to finish Stedman's term. Re-elected in 1930. Re-elected in 1932. Re-elected in 1934. Re-elected in 1936. [data missing]	1933–1943 [data missing]
Alonzo D. Folger (Mount Airy)	Democratic	January 3, 1939 – April 30, 1941	76th 77th	Elected in 1938. Re-elected in 1940. Died.	1933–1943 [data missing]
Vacant		April 30, 1941 – June 14, 1941	77th		1933–1943 [data missing]
John H. Folger (Mount Airy)	Democratic	June 14, 1941 – January 3, 1949	77th 78th 79th 80th	Elected to finish his brother's term. Re-elected in 1942. Re-elected in 1944. Re-elected in 1946. [data missing]	1933–1943 [data missing]
John H. Folger (Mount Airy)	Democratic	June 14, 1941 – January 3, 1949	77th 78th 79th 80th	Elected to finish his brother's term. Re-elected in 1942. Re-elected in 1944. Re-elected in 1946. [data missing]	1943–1953 [data missing]
Richard T. Chatham (Winston-Salem)	Democratic	January 3, 1949 – January 3, 1957	81st 82nd 83rd 84th	Elected in 1948. Re-elected in 1950. Re-elected in 1952. Re-elected in 1954. [data missing]	1943–1953 [data missing]
Richard T. Chatham (Winston-Salem)	Democratic	January 3, 1949 – January 3, 1957	81st 82nd 83rd 84th	Elected in 1948. Re-elected in 1950. Re-elected in 1952. Re-elected in 1954. [data missing]	1953–1963 [data missing]
Ralph J. Scott (Danbury)	Democratic	January 3, 1957 – January 3, 1967	85th 86th 87th 88th 89th	Elected in 1956. Re-elected in 1958. Re-elected in 1960. Re-elected in 1962. Re-elected in 1964. [data missing]	1953–1963 [data missing]
Ralph J. Scott (Danbury)	Democratic	January 3, 1957 – January 3, 1967	85th 86th 87th 88th 89th	Elected in 1956. Re-elected in 1958. Re-elected in 1960. Re-elected in 1962. Re-elected in 1964. [data missing]	1963–1973 [data missing]
Nick Galifianakis (Durham)	Democratic	January 3, 1967 – January 3, 1969	90th	Elected in 1966. Redistricted to the 4th district.	1963–1973 [data missing]
Vinegar Bend Mizell (Winston-Salem)	Republican	January 3, 1969 – January 3, 1975	91st 92nd 93rd	Elected in 1968. Re-elected in 1970. Re-elected in 1972. [data missing]	1963–1973 [data missing]
Vinegar Bend Mizell (Winston-Salem)	Republican	January 3, 1969 – January 3, 1975	91st 92nd 93rd	Elected in 1968. Re-elected in 1970. Re-elected in 1972. [data missing]	1973–1983 [data missing]
Stephen L. Neal (Winston-Salem)	Democratic	January 3, 1975 – January 3, 1995	94th 95th 96th 97th 98th 99th 100th 101st 102nd 103rd	Elected in 1974. Re-elected in 1976. Re-elected in 1978. Re-elected in 1980. Re-elected in 1982. Re-elected in 1984. Re-elected in 1986. Re-elected in 1988. Re-elected in 1990. Re-elected in 1992. Retired.	1973–1983 [data missing]
Stephen L. Neal (Winston-Salem)	Democratic	January 3, 1975 – January 3, 1995	94th 95th 96th 97th 98th 99th 100th 101st 102nd 103rd	Elected in 1974. Re-elected in 1976. Re-elected in 1978. Re-elected in 1980. Re-elected in 1982. Re-elected in 1984. Re-elected in 1986. Re-elected in 1988. Re-elected in 1990. Re-elected in 1992. Retired.	1983–1993 [data missing]
Stephen L. Neal (Winston-Salem)	Democratic	January 3, 1975 – January 3, 1995	94th 95th 96th 97th 98th 99th 100th 101st 102nd 103rd	Elected in 1974. Re-elected in 1976. Re-elected in 1978. Re-elected in 1980. Re-elected in 1982. Re-elected in 1984. Re-elected in 1986. Re-elected in 1988. Re-elected in 1990. Re-elected in 1992. Retired.	1993–2003 [data missing]
Richard Burr (Winston-Salem)	Republican	January 3, 1995 – January 3, 2005	104th 105th 106th 107th 108th	Elected in 1994. Re-elected in 1996. Re-elected in 1998. Re-elected in 2000. Re-elected in 2002. Retired to run for U.S. Senator.	1993–2003 [data missing]
Richard Burr (Winston-Salem)	Republican	January 3, 1995 – January 3, 2005	104th 105th 106th 107th 108th	Elected in 1994. Re-elected in 1996. Re-elected in 1998. Re-elected in 2000. Re-elected in 2002. Retired to run for U.S. Senator.	2003–2013
Virginia Foxx (Banner Elk)	Republican	January 3, 2005 – present	109th 110th 111th 112th 113th 114th 115th 116th 117th 118th 119th	Elected in 2004. Re-elected in 2006. Re-elected in 2008. Re-elected in 2010. Re-elected in 2012. Re-elected in 2014. Re-elected in 2016. Re-elected in 2018. Re-elected in 2020. Re-elected in 2022. Re-elected in 2024. Lost re-election.	2003–2013
Virginia Foxx (Banner Elk)	Republican	January 3, 2005 – present	109th 110th 111th 112th 113th 114th 115th 116th 117th 118th 119th	Elected in 2004. Re-elected in 2006. Re-elected in 2008. Re-elected in 2010. Re-elected in 2012. Re-elected in 2014. Re-elected in 2016. Re-elected in 2018. Re-elected in 2020. Re-elected in 2022. Re-elected in 2024. Lost re-election.	2013–2017
Virginia Foxx (Banner Elk)	Republican	January 3, 2005 – present	109th 110th 111th 112th 113th 114th 115th 116th 117th 118th 119th	Elected in 2004. Re-elected in 2006. Re-elected in 2008. Re-elected in 2010. Re-elected in 2012. Re-elected in 2014. Re-elected in 2016. Re-elected in 2018. Re-elected in 2020. Re-elected in 2022. Re-elected in 2024. Lost re-election.	2017–2021
Virginia Foxx (Banner Elk)	Republican	January 3, 2005 – present	109th 110th 111th 112th 113th 114th 115th 116th 117th 118th 119th	Elected in 2004. Re-elected in 2006. Re-elected in 2008. Re-elected in 2010. Re-elected in 2012. Re-elected in 2014. Re-elected in 2016. Re-elected in 2018. Re-elected in 2020. Re-elected in 2022. Re-elected in 2024. Lost re-election.	2021–2023 Static map of 2021-3 congressional district
Virginia Foxx (Banner Elk)	Republican	January 3, 2005 – present	109th 110th 111th 112th 113th 114th 115th 116th 117th 118th 119th	Elected in 2004. Re-elected in 2006. Re-elected in 2008. Re-elected in 2010. Re-elected in 2012. Re-elected in 2014. Re-elected in 2016. Re-elected in 2018. Re-elected in 2020. Re-elected in 2022. Re-elected in 2024. Lost re-election.	2023–2025
Virginia Foxx (Banner Elk)	Republican	January 3, 2005 – present	109th 110th 111th 112th 113th 114th 115th 116th 117th 118th 119th	Elected in 2004. Re-elected in 2006. Re-elected in 2008. Re-elected in 2010. Re-elected in 2012. Re-elected in 2014. Re-elected in 2016. Re-elected in 2018. Re-elected in 2020. Re-elected in 2022. Re-elected in 2024. Lost re-election.	2025–present
Chuck Hubbard (Wilkesboro)	Democratic	Taking office on January 3, 2027		Elected in 2026.	2025–present

== Past election results ==
=== 2004 ===
2004 North Carolina's 5th congressional district election
Party	Candidate	Votes	%
Republican	Virginia Foxx	167,546	58.83
Democratic	Jim A. Harrell Jr.	117,271	41.17
Total votes		284,817	100
Republican hold			

=== 2006 ===
2006 North Carolina's 5th congressional district election
Party	Candidate	Votes	%
Republican	Virginia Foxx (Incumbent)	96,138	57.16
Democratic	Roger Sharpe	72,061	42.84
Total votes		168,199	100
Republican hold			

=== 2008 ===
2008 North Carolina's 5th congressional district election
Party	Candidate	Votes	%
Republican	Virginia Foxx (Incumbent)	190,820	58.37
Democratic	Roy Carter	136,103	41.63
Total votes		326,923	100
Republican hold			

=== 2010 ===
2010 North Carolina's 5th congressional district election
Party	Candidate	Votes	%
Republican	Virginia Foxx (Incumbent)	140,525	65.89
Democratic	Billy Kennedy	72,762	34.11
Total votes		213,287	100
Republican hold			

=== 2012 ===
2012 North Carolina's 5th congressional district election
Party	Candidate	Votes	%
Republican	Virginia Foxx (Incumbent)	200,945	57.54
Democratic	Elisabeth Motsinger	148,252	42.46
Total votes		349,197	100
Republican hold			

=== 2014 ===
2014 North Carolina's 5th congressional district election
Party	Candidate	Votes	%
Republican	Virginia Foxx (incumbent)	139,279	61.0
Democratic	Joshua Brannon	88,973	39.0
Total votes		228,252	100.0
Republican hold			

=== 2016 ===
2016 North Carolina's 5th congressional district election
Party	Candidate	Votes	%
Republican	Virginia Foxx (incumbent)	207,625	58.4
Democratic	Josh Brannon	147,887	41.6
Total votes		355,512	100.0
Republican hold			

=== 2018 ===
2018 North Carolina's 5th congressional district election
Party	Candidate	Votes	%
Republican	Virginia Foxx (Incumbent)	159,917	57.0
Democratic	Denise D. Adams	120,468	43.0
Total votes		280,385	100
Republican hold			

=== 2020 ===
2020 North Carolina's 5th congressional district election
Party	Candidate	Votes	%
Republican	Virginia Foxx (incumbent)	257,843	66.9
Democratic	David Brown	119,846	31.1
Constitution	Jeff Gregory	7,555	2.0
Total votes		385,244	100.0
Republican hold			

=== 2022 ===
2022 North Carolina's 5th congressional district election
Party	Candidate	Votes	%
Republican	Virginia Foxx (incumbent)	175,279	63.15%
Democratic	Kyle Parrish	102,269	36.85%
Total votes		277,548	100.00%
Republican hold			

=== 2024 ===
2024 North Carolina's 5th congressional district election
Party	Candidate	Votes	%
Republican	Virginia Foxx (incumbent)	238,304	59.5
Democratic	Chuck Hubbard	162,390	40.5
Total votes		400,694	100.0
Republican hold			

== Historical district boundaries ==
North Carolina's 5th congressional district was created in 1789 as "the Western division; ... which shall be formed by annexing two of the Superior Court districts together, in the following manner: that is ... the districts of Washington and Mero shall form the Western division". The district of Mero consisted of the counties of Davidson, Sumner and Tennessee.

The boundaries have changed multiple times. The 2020 election the district has been updated per House Bill 1029 enacted by the NC General Assembly on November 15, 2019, becoming Session Law 2019-249, with district boundaries based on 2010 census tabulation blocks.

== See also ==
- List of United States congressional districts
- North Carolina's congressional districts
