= Alonzo Dillard Folger =

American politician (1888–1941)

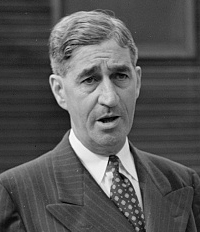
- Folger in 1940

Member of the U.S. House of Representatives from North Carolina's 5th district
- In office January 3, 1939 – April 30, 1941
- Preceded by: Franklin W. Hancock Jr.
- Succeeded by: John H. Folger

Personal details
- Born: Alonzo Dillard Folger; July 9, 1888 Dobson, North Carolina, U.S.
- Died: April 30, 1941 (aged 52) Mount Airy, North Carolina, U.S.
- Resting place: Dobson Cemetery
- Party: Democratic
- Education: University of North Carolina at Chapel Hill
- Occupation: lawyer

Alonzo Dillard Folger (July 9, 1888 – April 30, 1941) was a Democratic U.S congressman, serving one term from North Carolina between 1939 and 1941.

== Biography ==
Born in Dobson, North Carolina, Folger attended public schools in Surry County and attended the University of North Carolina at Chapel Hill. Folger graduated from UNC with a bachelor's degree in 1912 and a law degree in 1914.

=== Early career ===
He was admitted to the bar and opened a law practice in Dobson in 1914, relocating to Mount Airy to practice law there. From 1932 to 1938, he was a trustee of the University of North Carolina, and was named to the state's Superior Court in 1937.

Folger had served only two months as a judge when he resigned to serve on the Democratic National Committee; he was a member of the Committee from 1936 until his death in 1941.

=== Congress ===
As a Democrat, he was elected to the 76th United States Congress in 1938 and re-election to the 77th U.S. Congress in 1940, but his second term was cut short by his death in a car accident in Mount Airy on April 30, 1941.

In a special election, his brother John Hamlin Folger was chosen to succeed him on Congress.

=== Burial ===
Alonzo Folger is buried in Dobson Cemetery in his hometown of Dobson.

== See also ==
- List of members of the United States Congress who died in office (1900–1949)

U.S. House of Representatives
Preceded by Franklin W. Hancock Jr.	Member of the U.S. House of Representatives from North Carolina's 5th congressional district 1939–1941	Succeeded by John H. Folger
