= John Hamlin Folger =

American politician from North Carolina (1880–1963)

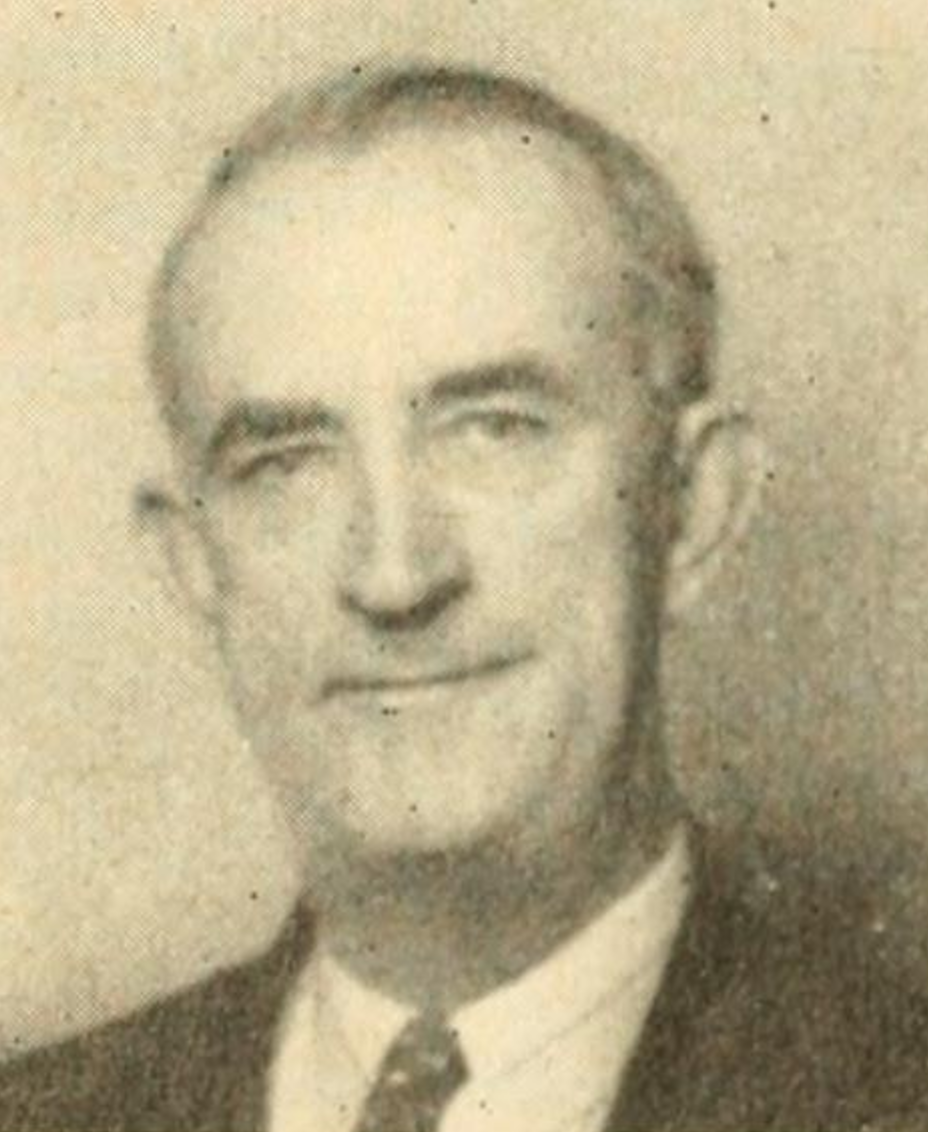

Member of the U.S. House of Representatives from North Carolina's 5th district
- In office June 14, 1941 – January 3, 1949
- Preceded by: Alonzo D. Folger
- Succeeded by: Richard T. Chatham

Member of the North Carolina Senate from the 23rd district
- In office 1931–1932
- Preceded by: Robert T. Joyce
- Succeeded by: S. Gilmer Sparger

Member of the North Carolina House of Representatives from Surry County
- In office 1927–1928
- Preceded by: Harry H. Barker
- Succeeded by: Holman Bernard

Mayor of Mount Airy, North Carolina
- In office May 3, 1909 – May 4, 1911
- Preceded by: Jesse H. Prather
- Succeeded by: W. G. Sydnor

Personal details
- Born: December 18, 1880 Rockford, North Carolina, U.S.
- Died: July 19, 1963 (aged 82) Clemmons, North Carolina, U.S.
- Party: Democratic
- Education: Guilford College; University of North Carolina at Chapel Hill
- Occupation: lawyer
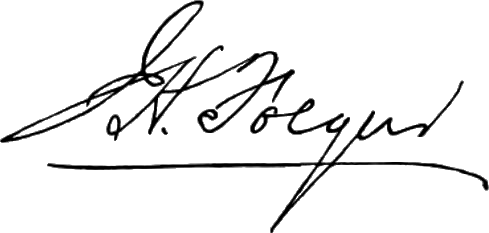
- Signature

John Hamlin Folger (December 18, 1880 – July 19, 1963) was a Democratic U.S. Congressman from North Carolina between 1941 and 1949.

Born in Rockford, North Carolina, Folger attended public schools in Surry County. He graduated from Guilford College in Greensboro, North Carolina and studied law at the University of North Carolina at Chapel Hill.

Admitted to the bar in 1901, Folger opened a law practice in Dobson, North Carolina. He was elected mayor of the town of Mount Airy, North Carolina from 1909, serving until 1911. He was sent to the North Carolina House of Representatives from 1927 to 1928 and to the North Carolina State Senate from 1931 to 1932.

Active in the North Carolina Democratic Party, Folger was a delegate to state Democratic conventions between 1924 and 1940 and to the Democratic National Conventions in 1932 and 1944. After the death of his brother, Rep. Alonzo D. Folger, John Folger was sent to Congress in a special election called to fill the vacancy. He was re-elected three more times, serving in the 77th, 78th, 79th, and 80th United States Congresses.

Folger did not stand for reelection in 1948 and returned to his law practice in Mount Airy, North Carolina, from which he retired in 1959. He died in Clemmons, North Carolina in 1963 and is buried in Mount Airy's Oakdale Cemetery.
