= Chatham Manufacturing Company =

American woolen mill

Coordinates: 36.2449°N 80.8447°W

Chatham MFG Co.
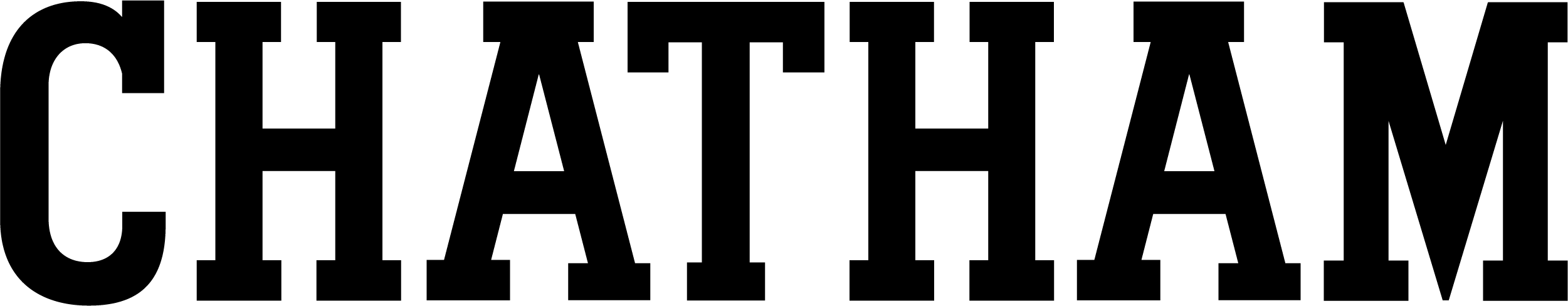
- Company type: Private
- Industry: Retail
- Predecessor: Chatham Manufacturing Company
- Founded: 1877 in North Carolina
- Founder: Alexander Chatham
- Headquarters: New York, NY, U.S.
- Area served: International
- Key people: Alexander Chatham
- Products: Outdoor apparel; blankets
- Owner: Alexander Chatham
- Website: www.chathammfg.com

Chatham Manufacturing Company is an American textile brand founded in 1877 that has made automobile upholstery, jeans, and flannels. Its most famous product is the Chatham Blanket. It was the largest blanket manufacturer in the world at its height.

== History ==
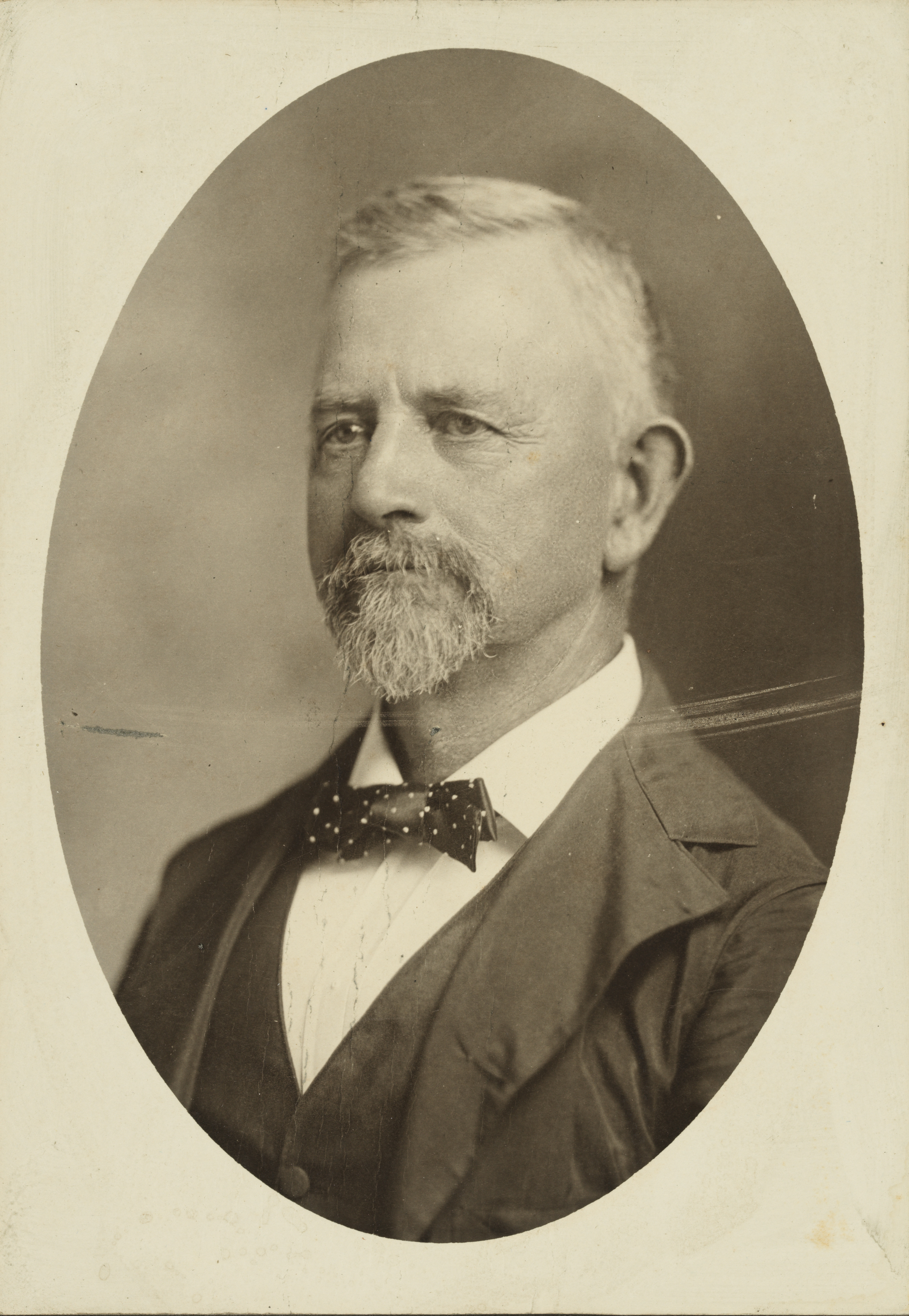
Alexander Chatham

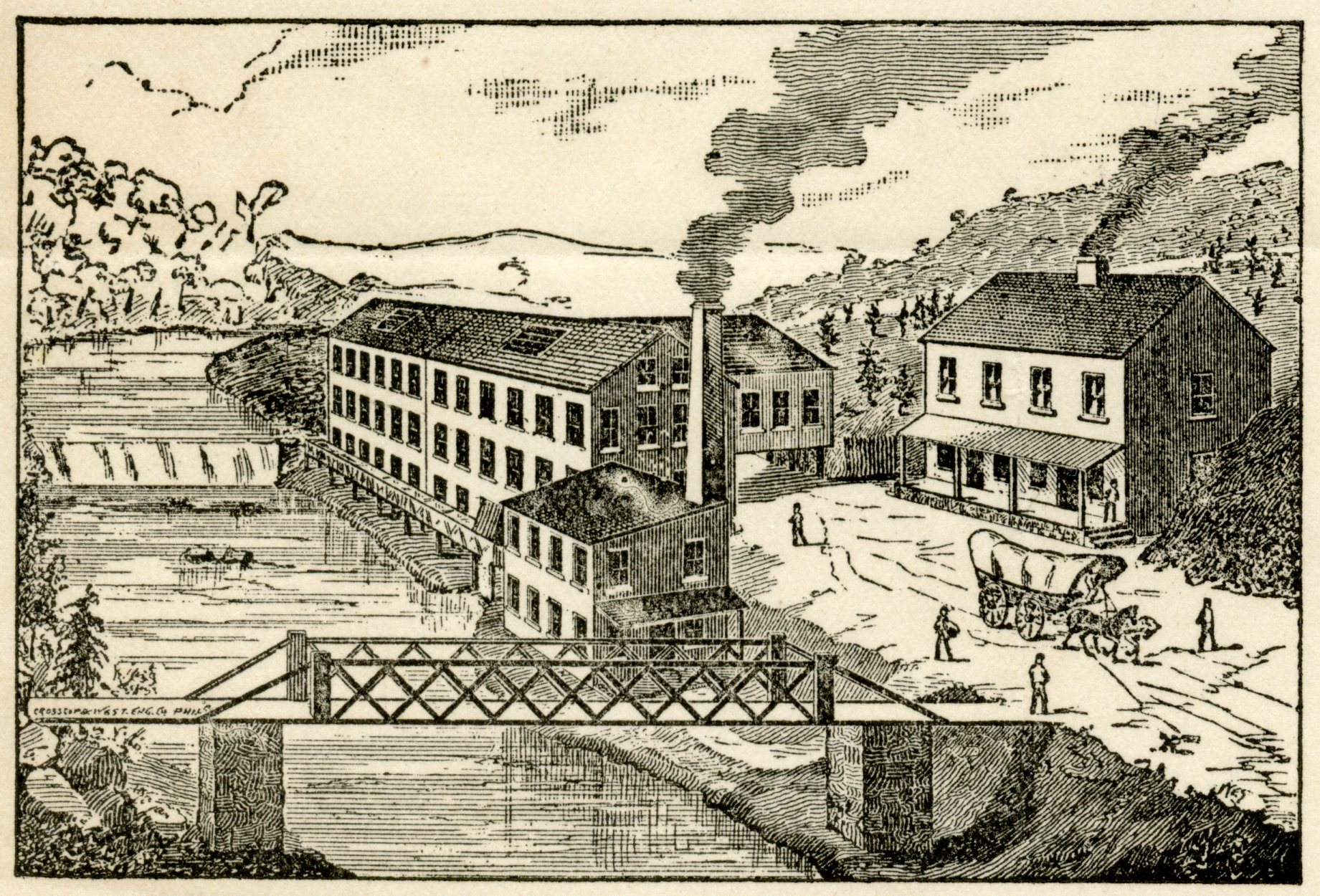
An engraving of the original Elkin Valley Woolen Mill, later Chatham Manufacturing Mill in the 1800s.

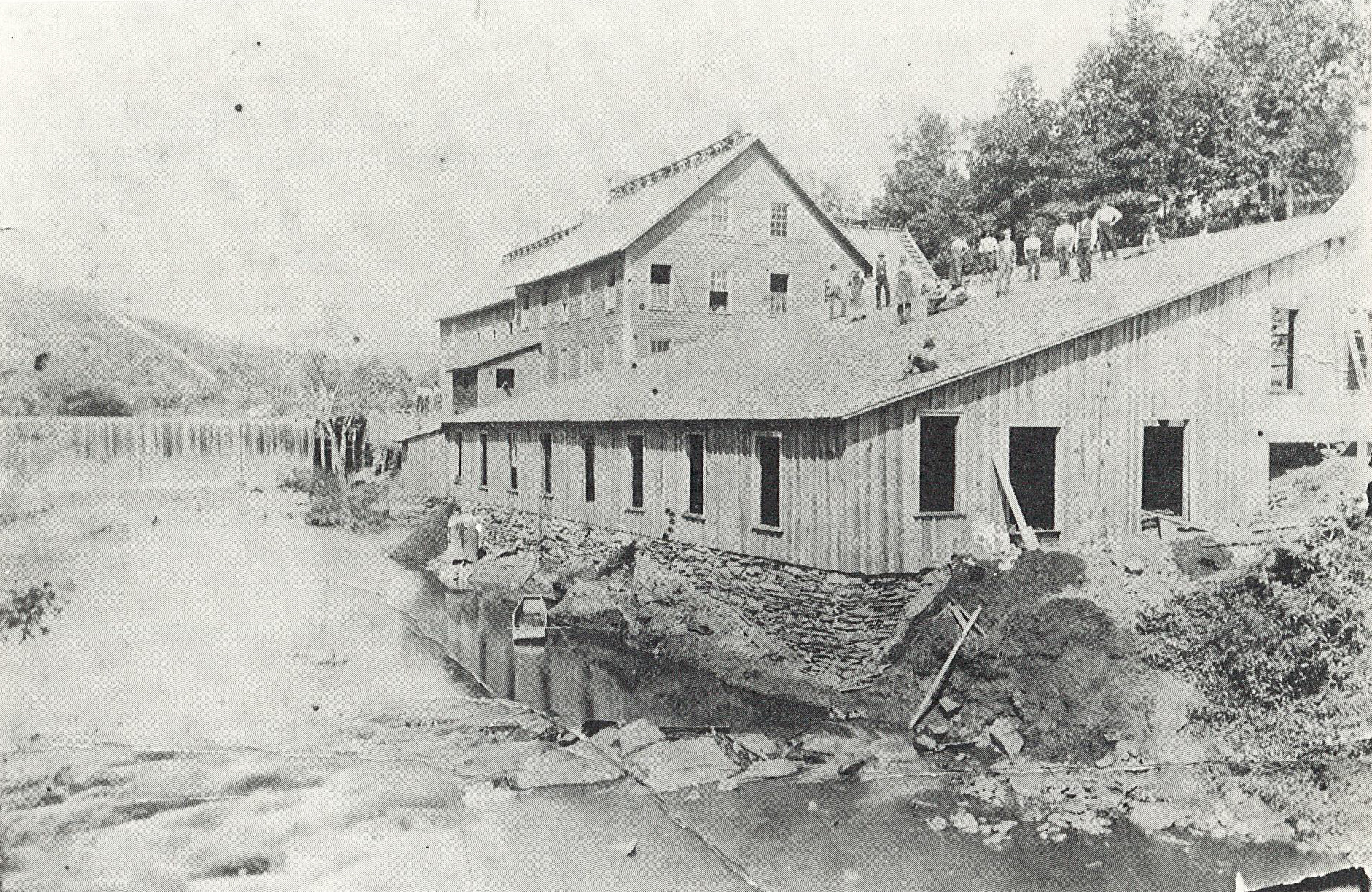
The Elkin Valley Woolen Mill in 1877

Alexander Chatham went to work as a clerk at the Gwyn Mill in 1858. Richard Gwyn built the grist mill along the Elkin Creek in Elkin North Carolina. It was powered by water from the creek and local farmers brought their corn to him to be ground into flour. The mill had a store and was a focal point for trade in the area. Cash was scarce in the area after the Civil War and sheep were abundant, so wool became the most common currency in the local barter economy. The Gwyn Mill had to accept wool in trade, cart it 60 miles away in order to sell the raw fiber which was then sent by rail to distant mills. The amount of wool being traded continued to increase so much that in the 1870s, the company bought a wool carding machine in order to process the wool. It was installed in the grist mill and powered by the same water wheel. This, in turn, brought in more wool from the mountains of North Carolina and the surrounding area. In 1877, Richard Gwyn and Alexander Chatham took over operation of the mill. They added a textile mill to the grist and carding mill and named the operation the “Elkin Valley Woolen Mill”. In the first years of the woolen mill operation, it employed only four people. In 1878, Gwyn and Chatham travelled to Philadelphia and recruited a machinist, Gilvin T Roth.

In 1890 the railroad arrived in Elkin. The North Carolina Railroad ran along the Yadkin River, and Gwyn and Chatham quickly made plans to move their factory to be alongside it. That same year, Thomas Gwyn sold his interest to Alexander Chatham and the company was renamed the Chatham Manufacturing Company. The new mill no longer needed water power, but instead used steam engines to power generators. The mill made only yarn until 1893 when they began to produce fabrics as well. That was the year that they made the first Chatham Blanket. In 1895 the company started making wool suiting fabric and brought a tailor from New York to make suits.

In 1907 the Chatham Manufacturing company reorganized. They built another factory in Winston-Salem. Alexander's son, Hugh Gwyn Chatham became the president.

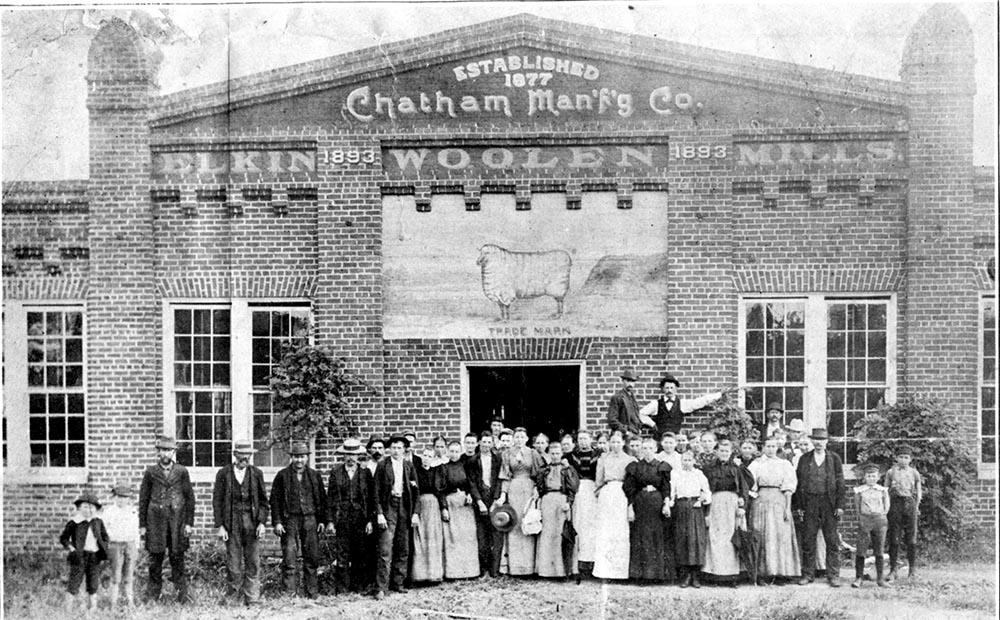
The second Chatham Mill, built in 1893.

In 1916 Elkin flooded, including the Chatham Manufacturing Company. The flood was devastating to the mill, and the company began work on a new mill on higher ground above the old one.

In 1929, Richard Thurmond Chatham took over the company from his father, Hugh Gwyn Chatham. He entered Chatham Manufacturing into the automotive upholstery business in 1936 with interiors for Packard. In 1939 the company moved its Winston-Salem Factory to Elkin to have everything in a single Place. Richard Thurmond Chatham was a naval officer and commanded a cruiser, the USS Phoenix, during World War 2. While he was at sea, the company produced blankets for the armed forces and was awarded the Army/ Navy Award of Excellence for wartime production.

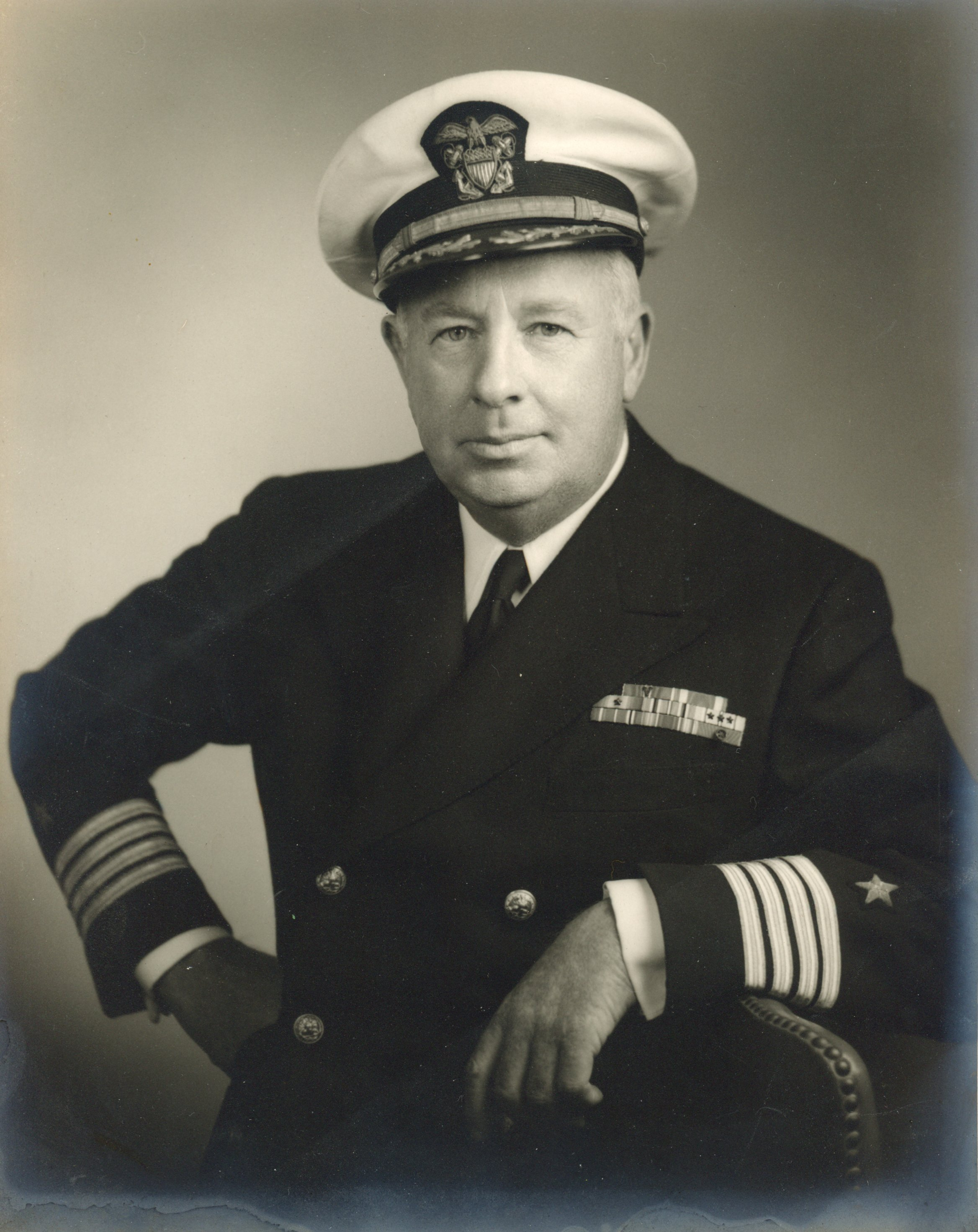
Richard Thurmond Chatham in his Naval portrait during World War 2.

In 1955, Hugh G. Chatham II, the older of R.T. Chatham's two sons, became president.

In 1970, Richard T. Chatham Jr. succeeded his brother as president.

== Chatham Blankets ==
In 1893 Chatham wove its first blanket. The first dozen were bound on a sewing machine by Mrs RL Hubbard. Although Chatham manufactured fabrics for many applications, Chatham Blankets were the only product with the name "Chatham" on them and the thing that the company would be most known for. During the first part of the 20th century, the primary focus of company sales were wool blankets. The Chatham Blanket became famous all over the United States. Wool blankets are soft, warm and naturally moisture wicking. The Chatham blanket process started with local, North Carolina Wool. The raw wool was washed in water from the Yadkin River and then carded to align the fibers. The carded wool was spun into threads and dyed. The wool threads were then warped and woven into cloth. The cloth was then napped and washed, then cut to size and bound. The finished blankets were warm in winter, breathable in summer, moisture wicking and self cleaning.

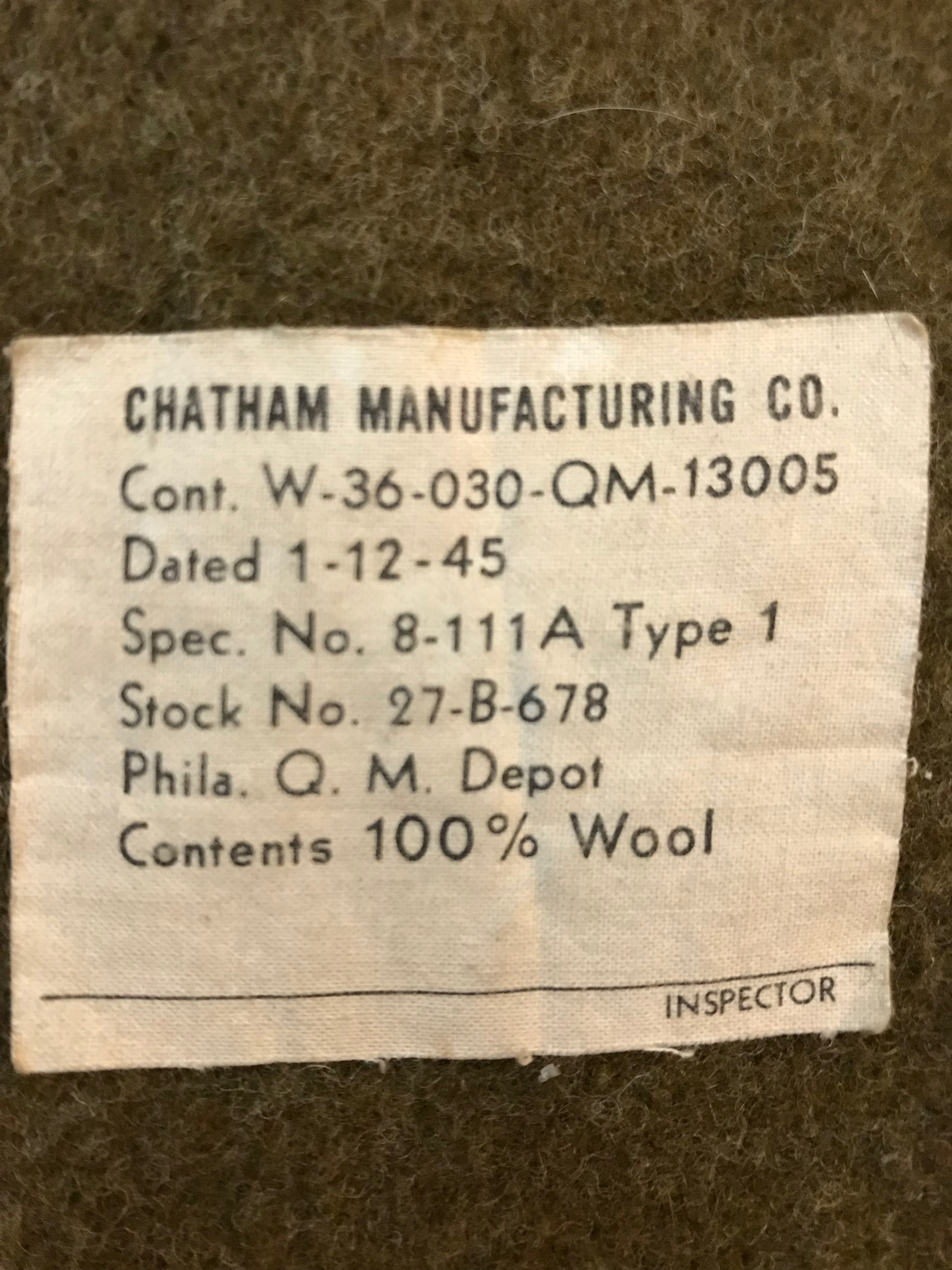
A Chatham Army Blanket

Around 1910, Chatham was the largest blanket manufacturer in the South, and by the 1940s and 1950s, they were the largest blanket manufacturer in the world. They manufactured millions of blankets for all branches of the armed forces in both world wars. The company was awarded the Army/ Navy Award of Excellence for wartime production for its military blankets.

== Automotive upholstery ==
In the 1930s the company started producing automotive upholstery. Studebaker, Packard, and Ford were among their automotive clients. The company built a finishing plant for Upholstery in Winston-Salem, NC but eventually moved it to Elkin to adjoin their main plant. Chatham designed the interior of the 1947 Studebaker Starlight designed by Raymond Loewy. They worked with famed textile designer Marianne Strengell on designs for automotive textiles. Chatham did not only work with American manufacturers; in 1980 they designed the interior for the Nissan Cedric SGL-F, a car only ever marketed in Japan.

== Chatham Blanketeers ==
Chatham Manufacturing organized a semi-professional baseball team called the Chatham Blanketeers. They represented North Carolina at The National Semi-Pro Baseball Tournament in Wichita, Kan., in 1937. The team won the North Carolina semi-pro championship in Asheboro in 1948 and in 1949 they went to the National Baseball Congress World Series.

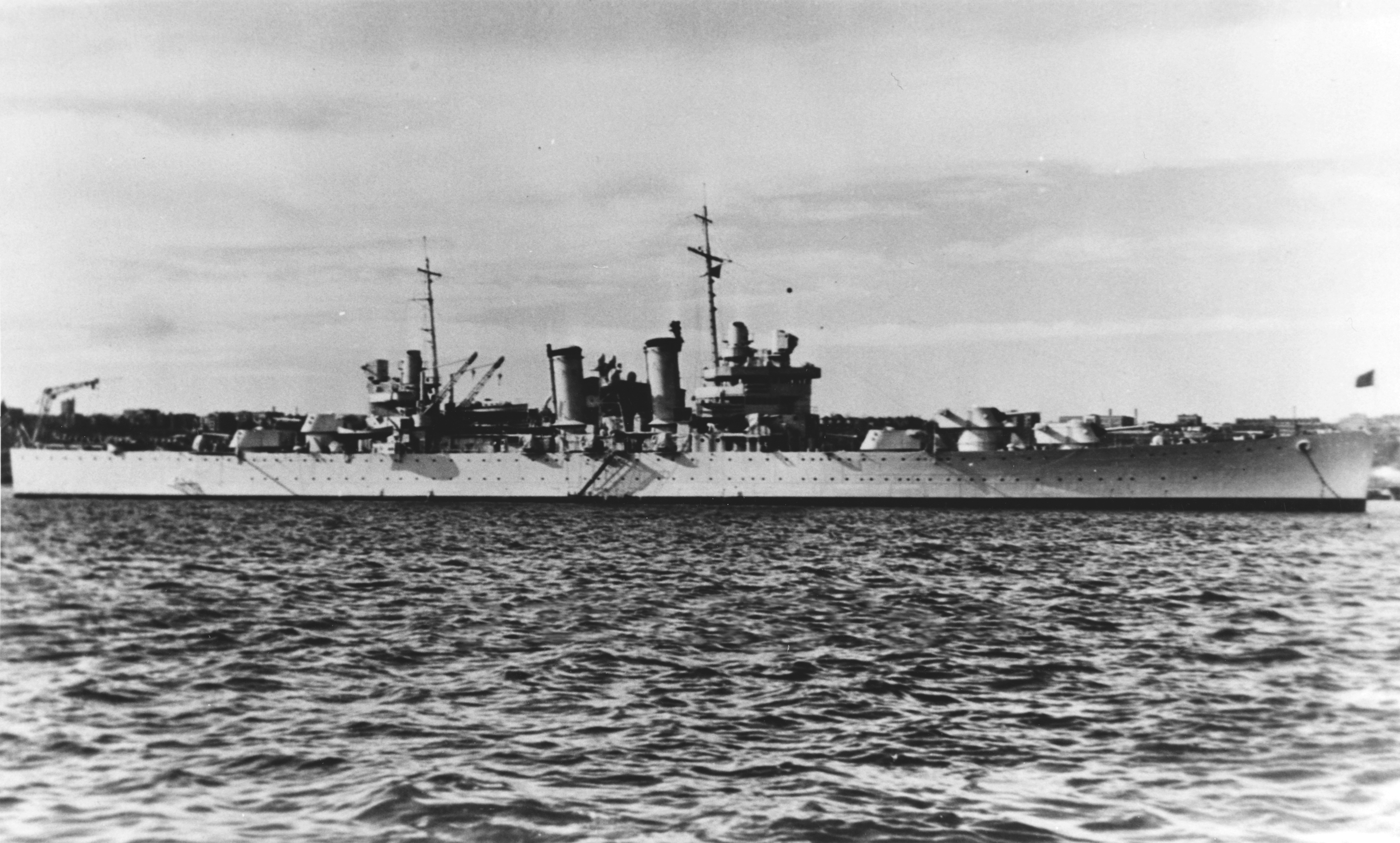
USS Phoenix in 1939

== Turmoil ==
In the late 1980s, Chatham Manufacturing owned plants in Elkin, Eden, and Charlotte. About two-thirds of the company's more than $125 million in sales in 1987 derived from upholstery products, while most of the rest of the company's revenues were from the sale of bedding products, including blankets. A majority of the company's stock was still owned by descendants of Alexander Chatham. However, in 1988, Northern Feather, Ltd., a Danish textile maker, outbid family members and senior management for control of Chatham Manufacturing and purchased the blanket-maker for more than $92 million.

== Ownership ==
The company has been revived by Alex Chatham, an Industrial Designer and the great-great-grandson of the original founder. He is on a mission to position the company as American made luxury by focusing on high quality craftsmanship and excellent materials.
