= National Register of Historic Places listings in Onslow County, North Carolina =

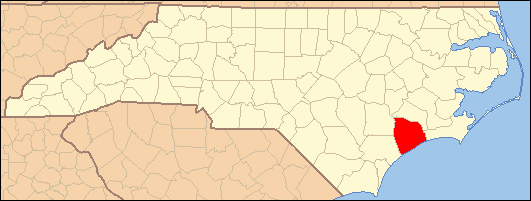

This list includes properties and districts listed on the National Register of Historic Places in Onslow County, North Carolina. Click the "Map of all coordinates" link to the right to view a Google map of all properties and districts with latitude and longitude coordinates in the table below.

== Current listings ==
This National Park Service list is complete through NPS recent listings posted March 14, 2025.

	Name on the Register	Image	Date listed	Location	City or town	Description
1	Alum Spring		January 31, 1990 (#89002349)	SR 1211, 1.6 miles south of SR 1001; 34°47′53″N 77°33′54″W	Catherine Lake	
2	Avirett-Stephens Plantation	Avirett-Stephens Plantation	April 18, 1991 (#91000465)	U.S. Route 258/North Carolina Highway 24, 0.25 miles north of NC 1227; 34°51′01″N 77°32′02″W	Richlands	
3	Bank of Onslow and Jacksonville Masonic Temple	Bank of Onslow and Jacksonville Masonic Temple	November 13, 1989 (#89001850)	214-216 Old Bridge St. 34°45′02″N 77°25′54″W	Jacksonville	
4	Catherine Lake Historic District		November 13, 1989 (#89001853)	Junction of SR 1001 and 1211; 34°49′01″N 77°33′44″W	Catherine Lake	
5	Futral Family Farm		November 13, 1989 (#89001851)	SR 1210, 1 mile southeast of its junction with SR 1209; 34°48′28″N 77°38′12″W	Fountain	
6	William Edward Mattocks House		March 22, 1989 (#89000166)	109 Front St. 34°41′14″N 77°07′05″W	Swansboro	
7	Mill Avenue Historic District	Mill Avenue Historic District	March 16, 1990 (#90000439)	Roughly bounded by Bluff, College, Court, W. Railroad, Wantland, Mill, and 1st 34°44′56″N 77°26′03″W	Jacksonville	
8	Palo Alto Plantation	Palo Alto Plantation	October 10, 1979 (#79003338)	SR 1434; 34°48′02″N 77°12′49″W	Palopato	
9	Pelletier House and Wantland Spring	Pelletier House and Wantland Spring	November 13, 1989 (#89001852)	Old Bridge St. at the New River; 34°45′05″N 77°26′02″W	Jacksonville	
10	Richlands Historic District	Richlands Historic District	March 16, 1990 (#90000441)	Roughly bounded by Foy, Trenton, Hargett, Wilmington, Franck, and Church Sts. 34°54′00″N 77°32′49″W	Richlands	
11	Southwest Historic District		November 13, 1989 (#89001854)	North Carolina Highway 53 and SR 1217; 34°44′25″N 77°30′22″W	Waltons Store	
12	Swansboro Historic District		March 16, 1990 (#90000440)	Roughly bounded by Walnut, Main, and Elm Sts., North Carolina Highway 24, the White Oak River, and Church, Water, and Broad Sts. 34°41′13″N 77°07′13″W	Swansboro	
13	Taylor Farm		January 27, 1999 (#99000063)	337 Comfort Rd. 34°55′18″N 77°31′53″W	Richlands	
14	Venters Farm Historic District	Venters Farm Historic District	May 7, 1987 (#86003504)	U.S. Route 258 and NC 1229; 34°51′46″N 77°32′56″W	Richlands	
15	Yopps Meeting House	Yopps Meeting House	July 22, 1999 (#99000868)	North Carolina Highway 172 at its junction with Sneads Ferry Rd. 34°33′30″N 77°24′16″W	Sneads Ferry	

== See also ==
- National Register of Historic Places listings in North Carolina
- List of National Historic Landmarks in North Carolina
