= Mattocks (surname) =

Mattocks is a surname. Notable people with the surname include:

- Charles Mattocks (1840-1910), American colonel in Union Army
- Christopher Sutton-Mattocks (born in 1951), English barrister and cricketer
- Claude Mattocks (born in 1980), Italian footballer
- Darren Mattocks (born in 1990), Jamaican footballer
- Doug Mattocks (1944-1999), English cricketer
- Gary Mattocks (born in 1931), American football coach
- George Mattocks (1735-1804), British stage actor and singer
- Isabella Mattocks (1746-1826), British actress and singer
- John Mattocks (1777-1847), American politician from Vermont
- Samuel Mattocks (1739-1804), American politician in Vermont
- Valerie Sutton-Mattocks (1920-2014), early female British aviation medicine researcher who co-authored pioneering long-haul cabin crew fatigue studies and pilot stress studies alongside H. P. Ruffell Smith. and a childhood friend of the DNA co-discoverer Rosalind Franklin.

== See also ==
- Mattock (surname)
- William Edward Mattocks House, a historic house in North Carolina
