= Southwest Historic District =

Southwest Historic District may refer to:

- Southwest Holly Springs Historic District, Holly Springs, MS, listed on the NRHP in Mississippi
- Southwest Historic District (Waltons Store, North Carolina), listed on the NRHP in North Carolina
- Hickory Southwest Downtown Historic District, Hickory, NC, listed on the NRHP in North Carolina
- Southwest Historic District (Roanoke, Virginia), listed on the NRHP in Virginia
- Southwest Mountains Rural Historic District, Keswick, VA, listed on the NRHP in Virginia
- Southwest Virginia Museum Historical State Park, Big Stone Gap, VA, listed on the NRHP in Virginia
- Southwest Historic District (Ripon, Wisconsin), listed on the NRHP in Wisconsin
- Southwest Side Historic District, Stoughton, WI, listed on the NRHP in Wisconsin
