= Valentine Howe =

American politician (1841–1904)

Valentine Howe Sr. (c. 1841–1904) was an African American builder and state legislator in North Carolina. He was elected in 1887 to the North Carolina House of Representatives, after defeating Alfred Moore Waddell. Hailing from a prominent family of carpenters and builders, Howe served as an alderman, vestryman, volunteer with the Cape Fear Fire Company, and was an Odd Fellow. He died at age 63 in 1904.

== See also ==
- African American officeholders from the end of the Civil War until before 1900
