= Fountaintown =

Fountaintown may refer to some places in the United States:

- Fountaintown, Indiana, an unincorporated town in Van Buren Township
- Fountaintown, North Carolina, a community in Duplin County
