= Mattock (surname) =

Mattock is a surname. Notable people with the surname include:

- Joe Mattock (born 1990), English footballer
- John Mattock (1926–2017), English rose grower
- John Mattock (c.1571–1612), Archdeacon of Lewes
- Jon Mattock, English musician

Fictional characters:

- Lilly Mattock, fictional soap character

== See also ==
- Mattocks (surname)
