= John W. Shackelford =

American politician

John Williams Shackelford
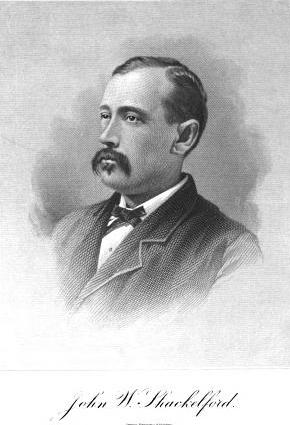

Member of the U.S. House of Representatives from North Carolina's 3rd district
- In office March 4, 1881 – January 18, 1883
- Preceded by: Daniel L. Russell
- Succeeded by: Wharton J. Green

Personal details
- Born: November 16, 1844 Richlands, North Carolina, U.S.
- Died: January 18, 1883 (aged 38) Washington, D.C., U.S.
- Resting place: Wallace Graveyard, Richlands, North Carolina
- Party: Democratic

Military service
- Allegiance: Confederate States of America
- Branch/service: Confederate States Army
- Rank: Lieutenant
- Unit: 3rd North Carolina; 35th North Carolina
- Battles/wars: American Civil War

John Williams Shackelford (November 16, 1844 – January 18, 1883) was a Confederate Civil War veteran who served one term as a Democratic U.S. congressman from North Carolina between 1881 and 1883.

== Biography ==
Shackelford was born in Richlands, North Carolina, the descendant of an early Virginia family which had settled at Shacklefords, Virginia.

=== Civil War ===
He enlisted in the Confederate Army at the age of 17 and rose to the rank of lieutenant during the war.

=== State legislature ===
In 1872, he was elected to the North Carolina House of Representatives, where he served for six years, when he was elected to the North Carolina Senate. He served a single two-year term in the Senate, before running for Congress

=== Congress ===
He was elected to the 47th United States Congress in 1880. Shackelford died in Washington, D.C., during his first and only term in office, in January 1883.

He is buried in his hometown of Richlands.

== See also ==
- List of members of the United States Congress who died in office (1790–1899)

U.S. House of Representatives
Preceded by Daniel L. Russell	Member of the U.S. House of Representatives from North Carolina's 3rd congressional district 1881–1883	Succeeded by Wharton J. Green
