= USS Burns (DD-588) =

Fletcher-class destroyer

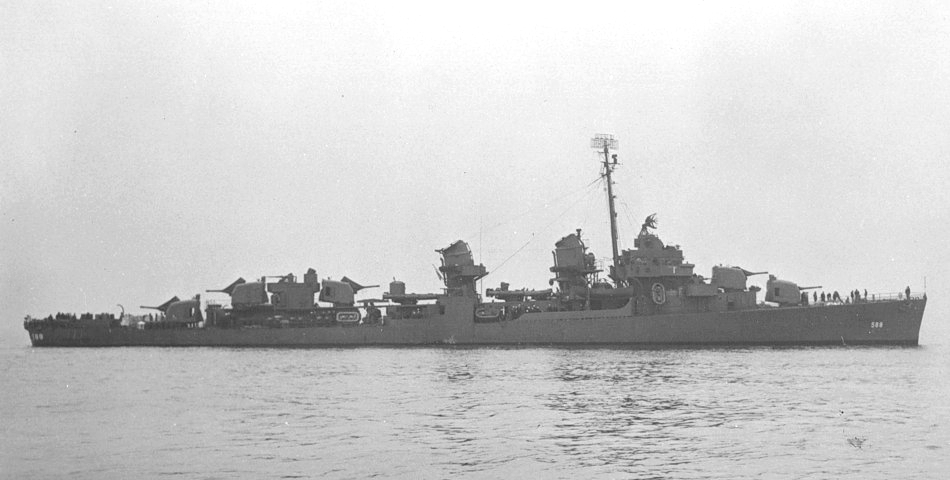
- USS Burns (DD-588) at sea c1945

History

United States
- Name: USS Burns (DD-588)
- Namesake: Hugh Otway Burns
- Builder: Charleston Navy Yard
- Laid down: 9 May 1942
- Launched: 8 August 1942
- Sponsored by: Mrs. Harry L. Smith
- Commissioned: 3 April 1943
- Decommissioned: 25 June 1946
- Stricken: 1 November 1972
- Fate: Sunk as a target, 20 June 1974

General characteristics
- Class & type: Fletcher-class destroyer
- Displacement: 2,050 tons
- Length: 376 ft 6 in (114.76 m)
- Beam: 39 ft 8 in (12.09 m)
- Draft: 17 ft 9 in (5.41 m)
- Propulsion: 60,000 shp (45,000 kW) × 2 propellers
- Speed: 35 kn (65 km/h; 40 mph)
- Range: 6,500 nmi (12,000 km; 7,500 mi) at 15 kn (28 km/h; 17 mph)
- Complement: 329
- Armament: 5 × 5-inch 38 caliber; 4 × 40 mm AA guns; 4 × 20 mm AA guns; 10 × 21 inch (533 mm) torpedo tubes; 6 × depth charge projectors; 2 × depth charge tracks

USS Burns (DD-588), was a Fletcher-class destroyer, the second ship of the United States Navy to be named for Captain Hugh Otway Burns (1775–1850), a privateer in the War of 1812.

Hugh Burns was launched 8 August 1942 by Charleston Navy Yard; sponsored by Mrs. Harry L. Smith, great-granddaughter of Captain Hugh Burns; and commissioned 3 April 1943.

== Service history ==
Burns arrived at Pearl Harbor 17 September 1943 and after a few weeks of training, embarked upon an outstanding World War II career. Between October 1943 and July 1945, with the exception of a stateside yard period (February–April 1945), Burns participated in the following operations, acting as anti-submarine escort, picket ship, fighter director ship, and aircraft rescue ship:

- Wake Island raid (5–6 October 1943),
- Gilbert Islands campaign (20 November – 8 December);
- Marshall Islands campaign
  - occupation of Kwajalein and Majuro Atolls (29 January – 8 February 1944),
  - raids on
    - Truk (16–17 February)
    - Palau-Yap-Ulithi-Woleai (30 March – 1 April) and
    - Truk-Satawan-Ponape (29 April – 1 May);
- Hollandia operation (21–24 April);
- Mariana and Palau Islands campaign (15 June – 6 August) which included
- the 1st, 2nd, 3rd, and 4th Bonins raids,
  - the Battle of the Philippine Sea,
  - the battles of Saipan and of Guam, and
  - the Palau-Yap-Ulithi raid;
- western Caroline Islands operation which included
  - the capture of the southern Palau Islands and
  - the assaults on the Philippine Islands (6 September – 14 October);
- Leyte operations including
  - the 3rd Fleet supporting operations against Okinawa, Luzon, and Formosa (10 October – 14 November);
  - Lingayen Gulf landings (4–18 January 1945); and
  - the Borneo operations, including
    - the Brunei Bay operation and
    - the Balikpapan operation (7 June – 7 July).

On 30 January 1944, after picking up three downed American aviators, Burns was off Ujae Atoll en route to rejoin her task group when she came upon a small Japanese convoy. During the ensuing 34-minute battle she succeeded in sinking all four Japanese vessels, a small cargo ship, a medium tanker, and two small, either cargo or escort, ships.

Shortly thereafter Burns, as a unit of Task Group 50.9 (TG 50.9), took part in a surface action off Truk, Caroline Islands (17 February 1944). She assisted in sinking Katori at 07°45' N. 151°20' E., and a trawler before being ordered to track down and dispose of the CH-24, which was accomplished at 1655 in 07°24' N., 150°30' E. Six Japanese survivors were rescued.

After the cessation of hostilities Burns remained in the Far East on occupation duty until December 1945. During this period she operated in the Yellow Sea supporting the occupation of Korea and China. She departed the Western Pacific 29 December 1945 and arrived at San Francisco 8 January 1946. She then reported to the 19th Fleet for inactivation and was placed out of commission in reserve 25 June 1946 at San Diego.

Burns was stricken from the Naval Vessel Register 1 November 1972, and sunk as a target 20 June 1974.

== Awards ==
Burns received 11 battle stars for her World War II service.
