= 1896 North Carolina gubernatorial election =

- November 3, 1896
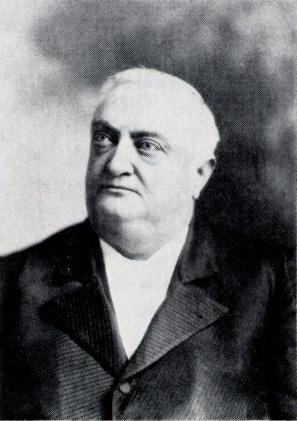

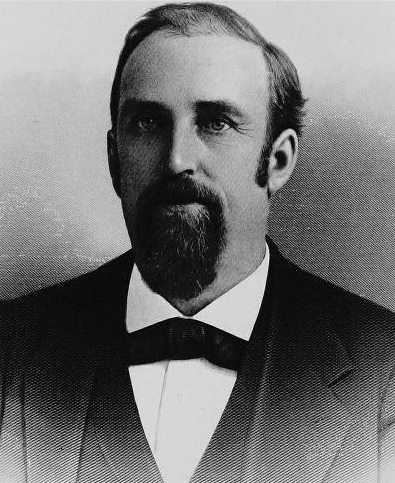

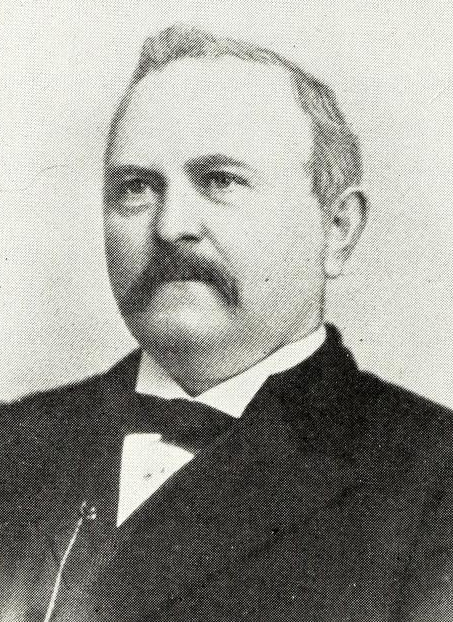
Nominee	Daniel Lindsay Russell	Cyrus B. Watson	William A. Guthrie
Party	Fusion	Democratic	Populist
Popular vote	154,025	145,286	30,943
Percentage	46.52%	43.89%	9.35%
- County results Russell: 30–40% 40–50% 50–60% 60–70% 70–80% Watson: 30–40% 40–50% 50–60% 60–70% Guthrie: 30–40%
Governor before election
Elias Carr
Democratic
Elected Governor
Daniel Lindsay Russell
Republican

The 1896 North Carolina gubernatorial election was held on November 3, 1896. Republican nominee Daniel Lindsay Russell defeated Democratic nominee Cyrus B. Watson with 46.52% of the vote. This was the only election in North Carolina between 1872 and 1972 in which the Republican nominee won the governor's office.

== Democratic convention ==
The state Democratic Party convention was held on June 25, 1896.

=== Candidates ===
- Cyrus B. Watson, former State Representative and former State Senator
- Walter Clark, Associate Justice of the North Carolina Supreme Court
- James C. MacRae
- Lee Slater Overman, State Representative

=== Results ===
Democratic convention results
Party	Candidate	Votes	%
Democratic	Cyrus B. Watson	592	65.41
Democratic	Walter Clark	173	19.12
Democratic	James C. MacRae	133	14.70
Democratic	Lee Slater Overman	7	0.77
Total votes		905	100.00

== Republican convention ==
The state Republican Party convention was held on May 15, 1896.

=== Candidates ===
- Daniel Lindsay Russell, former U.S. Representative
- Oliver H. Dockery, former U.S. Representative
- James E. Boyd
- James M. Moody, State Senator

=== Results ===
Republican convention results
Party	Candidate	Votes	%
Republican	Daniel Lindsay Russell	120	42.71
Republican	Oliver H. Dockery	113	40.21
Republican	James E. Boyd	22	7.83
Republican	James M. Moody	22	7.83
Total votes		281	100.00

== General election ==
=== Candidates ===
Major party candidates

- Daniel Lindsay Russell, Republican
- Cyrus B. Watson, Democratic

Other candidates

- William A. Guthrie, People's
- James R. Jones, National Prohibition
- Jeremiah W. Holt, Prohibition

=== Results ===
1896 North Carolina gubernatorial election
Party	Candidate	Votes	%	±%
Republican	Daniel Lindsay Russell	154,025	46.52%	
Democratic	Cyrus B. Watson	145,286	43.89%	
Populist	William A. Guthrie	30,943	9.35%	
Independent	James R. Jones	553	0.17%	
Prohibition	Jeremiah W. Holt	246	0.07%	
Majority		8,739		
Turnout				
Republican gain from Democratic		Swing		
