= Daniel Lindsay Russell =

49th Governor of North Carolina (1897–1901)

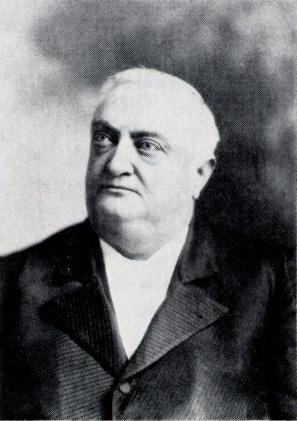

49th Governor of North Carolina
- In office January 12, 1897 – January 15, 1901
- Lieutenant: Charles A. Reynolds
- Preceded by: Elias Carr
- Succeeded by: Charles Brantley Aycock

Member of the U.S. House of Representatives from North Carolina's 3rd district
- In office March 4, 1879 – March 3, 1881
- Preceded by: Alfred Moore Waddell
- Succeeded by: John Williams Shackelford

Member of the North Carolina House of Commons from Brunswick County
- In office 1862–1866
- Preceded by: Thomas D. Meares
- Succeeded by: D.C. Allen

Personal details
- Born: August 7, 1845 Brunswick County, North Carolina, U.S.
- Died: May 14, 1908 (aged 62) near Wilmington, North Carolina, U.S.
- Party: Republican
- Other political affiliations: Greenback (1878)
- Spouse: Sarah Amanda Sanders
- Occupation: Attorney, judge

Daniel Lindsay Russell Jr. (August 7, 1845 – May 14, 1908) was an American politician who served as the 49th governor of North Carolina, from 1897 to 1901. An attorney and judge, he had also been elected as state representative and to the United States Congress, serving from 1879 to 1881. Although he fought with the Confederacy during the Civil War, Russell and his father were both Unionists. After the war, Russell joined the Republican Party in North Carolina, which was an unusual affiliation for one of the planter class. In the postwar period he served as a state judge, as well as in the state and national legislatures.

Elected on a fusionist ticket in 1896, a collaboration between Republicans and Populists that was victorious over the Democrats, Russell was the first Republican elected as governor in North Carolina since the end of the Reconstruction era in 1877. During his term, he approved legislation to extend the franchise by reducing the property requirement; it benefited the white majority in the state as well as blacks.

To prevent such a political coalition from being successful again, in the 1898 elections Democrats conducted a campaign of fear, stressing white supremacy, and regained power in the state legislature. Democrats in the Wilmington massacre of 1898, which took place in the largest city, overthrew the elected, biracial government headed by a white mayor and majority white council, beginning two days after the election. Russell's efforts to suppress the white riot were unsuccessful, and mobs attacked black neighborhoods, driving so many blacks permanently from the city that it became majority white.

The following year Democrats in the state legislature passed a new constitution over Russell's opposition and without submitting it to voters. It effectively disfranchised nearly all blacks and many poor whites. As a result, Russell was the last Republican to serve as governor of the state until 1973.

== Early life and education ==
Born on Winnabow Plantation in Brunswick County near Wilmington, North Carolina, Russell Jr. was the son of Daniel Lindsay Russell and Elizabeth Caroline Sanders, daughter of a prominent planter family. Following his mother's death three months after his birth, Russell Jr. lived at his mother's family's Palo Alto Plantation for six years before leaving for the Bingham School in Orange County, North Carolina. Russell attended the University of North Carolina at Chapel Hill, but left soon after the outbreak of the American Civil War. In college he was a member of the Delta Psi fraternity (aka St. Anthony Hall) He was commissioned as a captain in the Confederate Army and served in the war.

== Career ==
Russell was elected to the North Carolina General Assembly House of Commons (the lower house of the legislature) in North Carolina General Assembly of 1862-1864 during the Civil War. During that time, he also studied law, and was admitted to the bar in 1866. He set up practice in Wilmington. He and his father had both been Union sympathizers during the war, and Russell joined the Republican Party during Reconstruction.

In 1868, Russell was appointed a Superior Court judge in the 4th judicial circuit, a post he held until 1874. Russell angered Democrats when he ruled that white shopkeepers did not have a right to prohibit black people from entering their shops. In 1871 he was a delegate to a state constitutional convention. In 1876, he was a delegate to the 1876 Republican National Convention, and was again elected to the legislature.

Around this time, the paramilitary white supremacist "Red Shirts" fought to suppress the Republican Party and black voting in North Carolina. Their goal was to gain political control through the Democratic Party.

After the 1876 presidential election, Reconstruction ended and Federal troops were withdrawn from the South. Despite this loss of protection, Republicans and their black supporters remained active in North Carolina.

In 1878, Russell ran for U.S. Representative as a "fusion" candidate of the Republican and Greenback parties. In a close election, he defeated the Democratic incumbent Alfred M. Waddell by 11,611 votes to 10,730. Russell served one term in the 46th United States Congress (March 4, 1879 – March 4, 1881) and did not stand for renomination in 1880.

For the next decade, Russell practiced law and remained active in the Republican party. Then in the 1890s, the new Populist Party appeared. Though in most of the U.S., the Populists were allied with the Democrats, they allied with the Republicans in North Carolina, as common foes of the dominant Democratic Party organization. The alliance ran "fusion" candidates for many offices.

In 1896, the two parties held separate state conventions to allow the Populists to nominate presidential electors pledged to Democrat William J. Bryan. At the Republican state convention in Raleigh on May 16, 1896, Russell was nominated for Governor of North Carolina on the seventh ballot over former U.S. Representative Oliver H. Dockery. Disgruntled, Dockery convinced the Populists to run a separate statewide slate of candidates, with William A. Guthrie for Governor and Dockery for Lieutenant Governor. The Republicans and Populists ran joint candidates for the other state-wide offices.

Despite this breakdown of the alliance, many Populists supported Russell anyway, and some disgruntled Democrats voted for Guthrie. This allowed Russell to win the November 3 election with 153,787 votes (46.5%) to 145,266 votes for Democrat Cyrus B. Watson, 31,143 for Populist William A. Guthrie, and 809 for others. He served one four-year term. The Republican candidate for Lt. Governor was also elected, and the fusion ticket swept the other state-wide offices.

The Republican-Populist alliance had continued in elections to the legislature, and fusionists won control. They extended the franchise for the first time since Reconstruction by reducing property requirements for voters. This benefited many whites, who were the majority in the state, but also blacks. Russell signed the bill. With the broadened franchise, a number of blacks were elected to the legislature and to local government offices.

Although Russell was not up for election in 1898, Democrats used him as a foil in their campaign that year. They attacked him for undermining "white supremacy" and fanned fears of "negro rule", and regained control of the legislature.

=== Wilmington massacre of 1898 ===
On November 8, 1898, a part-black fusion slate won elections in Wilmington, then the state's largest city and with a black majority. Alfred Waddell, whom Russell had defeated for Congress in 1878, led thousands of white rioters in the Wilmington massacre of 1898; they seized the city government by force, and destroyed the only black-owned newspaper in the state.

The mob went on to attack the city's African-American neighborhoods, particularly Brooklyn, killing some people and chasing hundreds out of town. Governor Russell ordered the Wilmington Light Infantry (WLI) and federal Navy Reserves to quell the riot; instead they became involved. Because of the attacks, nearly 2,100 blacks left the city permanently, and its demographics were changed to a white majority.

To prevent "fusionist" coalitions or Republicans winning office again, in 1899 the Democrats used their control of the state legislature to pass an amendment that effectively disenfranchised blacks and many poor whites. Because the North Carolina governor did not have veto power until 1996, Russell was powerless to stop the Democratic state legislature from implementing the disenfranchisement laws. As a result, voter rolls dropped dramatically, blacks were excluded from the political system, and the Republican Party was crippled in the state. This condition lasted until the 1960s, when Federal civil-rights legislation restored black voting rights and white Southerners began to abandon their reflexive loyalty to the Democrats.

Russell was the last Republican elected as governor until 1972, when this transformation was well under way.

After finishing his term, Russell resumed the practice of law in Wilmington and operated his Belville Plantation. He died at his plantation near Wilmington in 1908. He was interred in the family burying ground in Onslow County, North Carolina.

Party political offices
Preceded by David M. Furches	Republican nominee for Governor of North Carolina; 1896	Succeeded by Spencer B. Adams
U.S. House of Representatives
Preceded by Alfred M. Waddell	Member of the U.S. House of Representatives from North Carolina's 3rd congressional district 1879–1881	Succeeded by John W. Shackelford
Political offices
Preceded by Elias Carr	Governor of North Carolina; 1897–1901	Succeeded by Charles Brantley Aycock
