= Christopher Sutton-Mattocks =

English cricketer

- Born: Christopher John Sutton-Mattocks; 10 July 1951 (age 75); Hammersmith, London, England
- Education: St Edmund Hall, Oxford
- Occupations: Barrister, coroner
- Years active: 1975–present
- Known for: Inquest rulings, legal practice
- Political party: SDP–Liberal Alliance (former)
- Spouse: Helen Chardin (m. 1985)
- Cricket career

Cricket information
- Batting: Left-handed

Domestic team information
- Years: Team
- 1972–1973: Oxford University
- 1975: Surrey Second XI

Career statistics
Competition	First-class	List A
Matches	6	4
Runs scored	107	33
Batting average	8.91	8.25
100s/50s	0/0	0/0
Top score	37	13
Balls bowled	–	–
Wickets	–	–
Bowling average	–	–
5 wickets in innings	–	–
10 wickets in match	–	–
Best bowling	–	–
Catches/stumpings	2/–	2/–
- Source: Cricinfo, 4 March 2020

Christopher John Sutton-Mattocks (born 10 July 1951) is a British-Maltese barrister, coroner, judge and first-class cricketer.

== Early life and education ==
He was born at Hammersmith in July 1951. He was educated at Winchester College before going up to St Edmund Hall, Oxford.

== Cricket career ==
While studying at Oxford, he played first-class cricket for Oxford University 1972 and 1973, making six appearances. He scored 107 runs in his six matches, at an average of 8.91 and a high score of 37. Sutton-Mattocks also played List A cricket for Oxford in the 1973 Benson & Hedges Cup, making four appearances. With Oxford University, he played alongside cricketers such as later Sussex cricketer Mark Faber in June 1972 against Lancashire and in June 1973 alongside the Pakistan international and later Prime Minister of Pakistan Imran Khan. Following his university career, Sutton-Mattocks went on to play for the Surrey Second XI in the 1975 Second Eleven Championship. He also appeared for club sides, including representing the Marylebone Cricket Club (MCC) in 1974 when he was caught by his former university teammate Imran Khan.

== Legal and public career ==
=== Barristerial and judicial work ===
A member of the Middle Temple, he was called to the bar in July 1975. He practiced in criminal law from King's Bench Walk. As a defence barrister, his work included acting as lead counsel in the case of R v O & Ors at Snaresbrook Crown Court, which involved a long-running trial and re-trial centred on charges of kidnapping, false imprisonment and grievous bodily harm where victims were burned with irons over a failed drug deal.

He was appointed a recorder, a part-time circuit judge in 1996. He presided in courts including Maidstone Crown Court. He stepped down in March 1998 after he was fined £500 by a Bar Council disciplinary tribunal for professional misconduct involving harassment.

=== Coronial law ===
Sutton-Mattocks served as HM Assistant Coroner for Surrey and for Kent and Medway. In this role, he presided over several inquests. He led the 2020 inquest into the death of baby Harry Richford, which was later referenced in the independent review of maternity services in East Kent. The Care Quality Commission later prosecuted East Kent Hospitals University NHS Foundation Trust for failures in mother and baby’s care. His other coroner rulings include presiding over the 2021 unlawful killing inquest of the Ford twins, and issuing Regulation 28 "Prevention of Future Deaths" reports to Surrey County Council regarding cycling road safety defects following the death of Ralph Brazier and to Her Majesty's Prison and Probation Service recommending the development of protocols to deny vulnerable inmates access to razor blades at HMP Elmley. As counsel to the inquest, he also participated in major structural inquiries, including the 2011 Swanscombe Channel Tunnel Rail Link locomotive fire inquest. In July 2009, he presided over a military inquest into the death of Corporal Ivano Violino of the 36 Engineer Regiment, who was killed after his vehicle struck an improvised explosive device in Helmand Province during the war in Afghanistan. Sutton-Mattocks issued a verdict that Corporal Violino was killed in action. In 2010, the Ministry of Defence introduced a new armoured truck for essential engineering tasks on the front line in Afghanistan that provided enhanced blast protection against roadside bombs, using an Urgent Operational Requirement contract.

=== Politics and public role ===
He stood for the SDP–Liberal Alliance in Maidstone in the 1987 general election, finishing second to Ann Widdecombe. At the Maidstone Liberals' annual meeting held at the Old Palace, Sutton-Mattocks outlined the Alliance's main aims as getting people back to work and improving health and education. He said the Alliance wanted the national income from North Sea oil and gas to be reinvested into long-term economic development rather than short-term political spending. During the 1987 election campaign, healthcare emerged as a local debate after regional doctors, encouraged by the British Medical Association, petitioned the parliamentary candidates over a 12 percent annual increase in local hospital waiting times. In his response to the practitioners' committee, Sutton-Mattocks criticised regional appointment waiting lists that stretched up to 32 weeks and joined the Labour candidate Kevin Brooks in opposing a tenfold rise in national Prescription charges under the sitting Thatcher government. He also campaigned on local environmental preservation, aligning with a campaign by Friends of the Earth in publicly opposing a Department of Energy decision to grant licences for exploratory oil drilling near Leeds Castle, arguing that industrial growth should not place internationally renowned heritage sites in jeopardy. Outside of politics, he previously served as a governor at Sevenoaks Preparatory School in Sevenoaks, Kent between 2010 and 2022. In December 2023, the Malta Government Gazette confirmed that he had been naturalised or registered as a citizen of Malta during the 2022 calendar year.

== Family ==
In September 1985, Christopher married Helen Chardin, a linguist and public relations officer from Cambridge, at St Mary's Church, Barnes. Chardin worked with Moët & Chandon and provided factual assistance for Anthony Hogg's 1985 publication, Everybody's Wine Guide. Following their marriage, the couple lived in Loose, Kent. The Chardin family in England have origins in Huguenot Protestant refugees who fled religious persecution in France and arrived in Great Britain and Ireland during the 17th and 18th centuries. Historical members included Charles II's jeweller and traveller to Persia Jean Chardin and his brother, Daniel Chardin the Mayor of Madras. They partnered closely with colonial administrator Elihu Yale in the diamond trade alongside the East India Company.

Christopher is the son of solicitor "Terry" Terence Montmirail Sutton-Mattocks and aviation researcher Valerie Marguerite Sutton-Mattocks. Both of his parents came from a legal and cricketing background. Terence practiced for 50 years at the law firm, Sutton-Mattocks & Co, which was founded in 1929. In December 2023, the firm was acquired by Bindmans LLP. He was also a cricketer, playing for the Law Society between 1938 and 1958, as well as appearing for amateur clubs including The Forty Club and the Marylebone Cricket Club. During the Second World War, he served as a lieutenant in the Royal Naval Volunteer Reserve (RNVR) and was mentioned in despatches in December 1945. Terence was the son of Francis George Sutton-Mattocks (1887–1972), a Mauritius-born solicitor and local politician who served as the Mayor of the Municipal Borough of Barnes from 1946 to 1947. During the First World War, Francis served as a lieutenant in the Royal Field Artillery (Special Reserve) and was appointed a Chevalier of the French Légion d'honneur in January 1920. The award followed a recommendation by the 3rd Belgian Division for conspicuous gallantry under fire while he was commanding a supporting 30th Division medium trench mortar battery in no man's land in September 1918. The report noted that "he kept coolly walking from one mortar to another, fully exposed, encouraging his gunners with cheerful words and by his utter contempt of extreme peril." He was awarded the Freedom of the Borough of Richmond upon Thames in 1965. He was married to Bertha May Sutton-Mattocks. She was appointed a Member of the Order of the British Empire (MBE) in the 1962 Birthday Honours for political and public services in Richmond and Barnes. Other members of the family served in the military in British India, such as Lieutenant-Colonel Frederick Sutton-Mattocks MBE, who was born in the Crown Colony of Malta. He served with the Royal Engineers, Indian Army and was recognised in the 1925 Birthday Honours. Frederick served as Staff Officer to the Deputy Chief Engineer for the Buildings and Roads Branch in India, a precursor to the modern Public Works Department (PWD).

Christopher's mother Valerie Sutton-Mattocks co-authored a landmark cabin crew workload study alongside H. P. Ruffell Smith and the BOAC medical director. She was born in The Cottage, Kew Gardens and was a childhood friend of the DNA co-discoverer Rosalind Franklin. She was active in post-war club women's cricket, playing for the Civil Service Cricket Club and co-founding the Riverside Women's Cricket Club in 1946. Her father, Lewis Walter Taylor (d. 1950) was a London solicitor who operated the firm Lewis W. Taylor & Co. out of Gray's Inn. Lewis W. Taylor & Co. instructed counsel including Cyril Salmon QC (later Baron Salmon) in the 1953 Court of Appeal case In the Estate of Park, decd. Park v Park, which established a precedent in English law regarding the capacity to contract a marriage. The firm also served as the primary legal representatives for the feminist author Dora Russell in her complex domestic and educational disputes against her husband, the philosopher Bertrand Russell, 3rd Earl Russell. The judge, legal theorist and Liberal parliamentary candidate Heber Leonidas Hart KC acted as the best man at Lewis Taylor's wedding in Hammersmith to Dora Patterson of Royal Gardens, Kew. Dora was the daughter of George Dobson Patterson, a government architect and clerk of works at Kew Palace and Kew Gardens who worked closely under the Principal Architect of the Office of Works, Sir Henry Tanner. Her brother was Gray's Inn barrister and later civil servant William Henry Leonard Patterson CBE who served as Assistant Secretary at the Board of Trade. He was Controller of the Import Licensing Department from 1945 to 1948 and then appointed Commander of the Order of the British Empire in the 1948 Honours. He was a member of the National Liberal Club. Dora was the first cousin of Elizabeth Havelock Patterson, the wife of Labour MP and Newcastle Lord Mayor David Adams. A high-profile parliamentary supporter of the anti-fascist International Brigades in the Spanish Civil War, Adams featured on the Nazi "Black Book" invasion list.
