= USS Burns (DD-171) =

Wickes-class destroyer

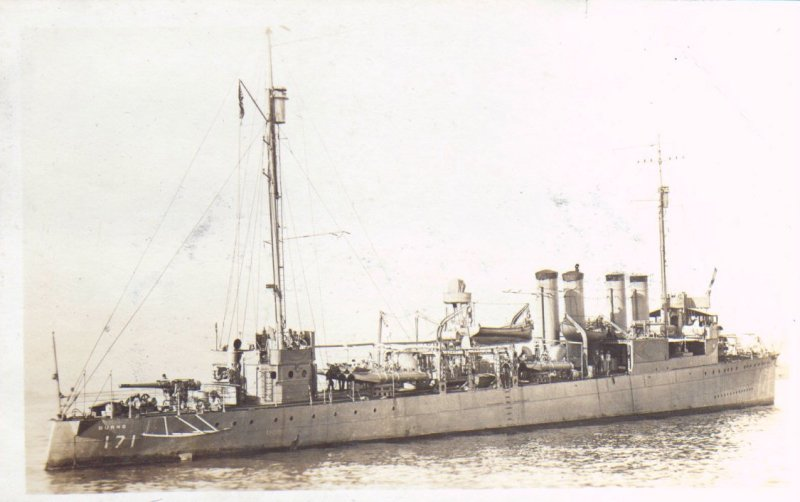
- USS Burns (DD-171)

History

United States
- Name: USS Burns (DD-171)
- Namesake: Otway Burns
- Builder: Union Iron Works, San Francisco, California
- Laid down: 15 April 1918
- Launched: 4 July 1918
- Sponsored by: Miss Alice H. Palmer
- Commissioned: 7 August 1919
- Decommissioned: 2 June 1930
- Reclassified: 15 March 1921, as DM-11
- Stricken: 30 November 1930
- Fate: Sold for scrapping, 22 April 1932

General characteristics
- Class & type: Wickes-class destroyer
- Displacement: 1,202–1,208 long tons (1,221–1,227 t) (standard); 1,295–1,322 long tons (1,316–1,343 t) (deep load)
- Length: 314 ft 4 in (95.8 m)
- Beam: 30 ft 11 in (9.42 m)
- Draught: 9 ft 10 in (3.0 m)
- Installed power: 27,000 shp (20,000 kW); 4 water-tube boilers
- Propulsion: 2 shafts, 2 steam turbines
- Speed: 35 knots (65 km/h; 40 mph) (design)
- Range: 2,500 nautical miles (4,600 km; 2,900 mi) at 20 knots (37 km/h; 23 mph) (design)
- Complement: 6 officers, 108 enlisted men
- Armament: 4 × single 4-inch (102 mm) guns; 2 × single 1-pounder AA guns; 4 × triple 21 inch (533 mm) torpedo tubes; 2 × depth charge rails

USS Burns (DD-171) was a Wickes-class destroyer built for the United States Navy during World War I.

== Description ==
The Wickes class was an improved and faster version of the preceding Caldwell-class. Two different designs were prepared to the same specification that mainly differed in the turbines and boilers used. The ships built to the Bethlehem Steel design, built in the Fore River and Union Iron Works shipyards, mostly used Yarrow boilers that deteriorated badly during service and were mostly scrapped during the 1930s. The ships displaced 1,202–1,208 long tons (1,221–1,227 t) at standard load and 1,295–1,322 long tons (1,316–1,343 t) at deep load. They had an overall length of 314 feet 4 inches (95.8 m), a beam of 30 feet 11 inches (9.4 m) and a draught of 9 feet 10 inches (3.0 m). They had a crew of 6 officers and 108 enlisted men.

Performance differed radically between the ships of the class, often due to poor workmanship. The Wickes class was powered by two steam turbines, each driving one propeller shaft, using steam provided by four water-tube boilers. The turbines were designed to produce a total of 27,000 shaft horsepower (20,000 kW) intended to reach a speed of 35 knots (65 km/h; 40 mph). The ships carried 225 long tons (229 t) of fuel oil which was intended gave them a range of 2,500 nautical miles (4,600 km; 2,900 mi) at 20 knots (37 km/h; 23 mph).

The ships were armed with four 4-inch (102 mm) guns in single mounts and were fitted with two 1-pounder guns for anti-aircraft defense. Their primary weapon, though, was their torpedo battery of a dozen 21 inch (533 mm) torpedo tubes in four triple mounts. In many ships a shortage of 1-pounders caused them to be replaced by 3-inch (76 mm) anti-aircraft (AA) guns. They also carried a pair of depth charge rails. A "Y-gun" depth charge thrower was added to many ships.

== Construction and career ==
Burns, named for Otway Burns, was launched 4 July 1918 by Union Iron Works, San Francisco, California; sponsored by Miss Alice H. Palmer, and commissioned 7 August 1919.

Burns was attached to Destroyer Force, Pacific, until March 1920 when she was ordered to special duty as a tender for NC Seaplane Division. On 15 March 1921 she was reclassified DM-11 and on 5 May she was assigned to the Mine Force, Pacific. She was at Mare Island Navy Yard 11 July undergoing conversion and overhaul when her home yard was changed and she departed for Naval Station Pearl Harbor, where she completed the yard period. Thereafter, attached to Mine Squadron 2 Pacific Fleet, she served throughout her active service in the vicinity of the Hawaiian Islands except for periodic concentrations of the Fleet in other areas for maneuvers and Fleet problems.

In 1925 she joined the Fleet for a tour of Australia and New Zealand. In the summers of 1926, 1927, and 1928 she conducted training cruises for Naval Reservists. In 1927 Burns returned to San Diego with her squadron for inspection, training, and recreation. Returning to Pearl Harbor, she participated in mining and gunnery practice, and acted as a high-speed target for submarines in Hawaiian waters until November 1929. Arriving at San Diego 26 November, Burns was decommissioned 2 June 1930. On 11 June she was towed to Mare Island Navy Yard where she was used as a barracks ship. She was later scrapped and her material sold 22 April 1932.
