= William A. Guthrie =

American politician (1846–1916)

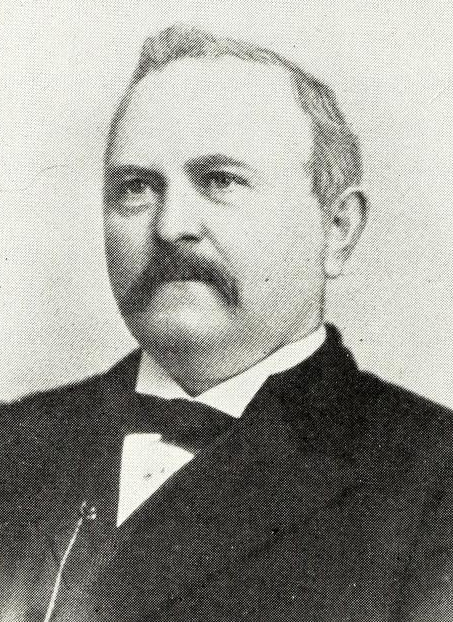
William A. Guthrie

William Anderson Guthrie (February 6, 1846 – October 14, 1916) was an American lawyer and politician. Born in Chatham County, North Carolina, he attended the University of North Carolina at Chapel Hill and served in the Confederate States Army during the American Civil War. After the war, Guthrie married and moved to Fayetteville to practice law. He moved his practice to Durham in 1884.

Guthrie was initially a member of the Republican Party, but left and joined the Populist Party after it formed in the 1890s. In 1896 the Populists nominated him as their candidate for that year's gubernatorial election. Shortly thereafter, Populist leaders reached a deal with North Carolina Republicans to combine their state tickets in a Fusionist coalition to defeat Democrats. Despite this, both parties continued to formally back their own gubernatorial candidates. Guthrie was opposed to Fusion and focused his campaign around support for free silver and other national issues, largely resembling the style of the Democratic candidate in the race. Feeling rejected by his own party and wary of a Republican victory, Guthrie endorsed the Democrat late in the campaign and urged Populists to fuse with the Democratic ticket. The Populist vote split in the election, with the Republican winning and Guthrie placing third, earning a majority in only one county. He joined the Democratic Party in 1898 but spent most of his later life focused on his law practice.

== Early life ==
William Anderson Guthrie was born on February 6, 1846, in Chatham County, North Carolina, United States. After graduating from the University of North Carolina at Chapel Hill, he enlisted in the Confederate States Army to fight in the American Civil War. In 1864 he joined Company G, Third North Carolina Cavalry, as a private. Captured that December, he was held in the federal prisoner of war camp at Point Lookout, Maryland, until being paroled in March 1865.

In November 1866 Guthrie married Mary Ella Carr, a sister of Julian Carr. He and his wife subsequently moved to Fayetteville, where he opened a law practice. He worked there until he moved to Durham in 1884, where he continued to practice law and eventually formed a legal partnership with his son.

== Political career ==
=== Early activities ===
Guthrie was initially a member of the Republican Party, but left and joined the Populist Party after it formed in the 1890s. Within North Carolina and nationally, the Populist Party had risen out of discontent among struggling farmers who sought government action to redress their grievances. Guthrie later explained that he left the Republican Party because he believed its best qualities were gone and he supported election law reforms, saying, "The interests of the black man and the white men are identical." During the Populists' first statewide convention in 1892 he was nominated as a candidate for an associate justice's seat on the North Carolina Supreme Court.

=== 1896 gubernatorial candidacy ===
In order to dislodge the Democratic Party politicians which had controlled state affairs since the end of Reconstruction, the Republicans and Populists cooperated with one another during the 1894 state legislative elections in a process Democrats derided as "Fusion". The Fusionist coalition of Republicans and Populists won a majority in the North Carolina General Assembly and used their power to liberalize election laws, thus expanding suffrage in the state.

Despite their joint support of certain reforms, the Republican and Populist coalition was strained by differences between the two parties which became more acute in anticipation of the 1896 United States presidential election. In April 1896, state leaders of both parties met to discuss possible Fusion for that year's state elections but deadlocked over several key issues, including the fact that both parties wanted to reserve the right to choose their own candidate for the office of governor of North Carolina. At their contentious state convention the following month, the Republicans nominated a pro-Fusion slate of candidates for state offices, with Daniel L. Russell as their choice for governor. The ticket was left incomplete to allow for the Populists to choose some of the candidates at their convention. Some dissident black Republicans held their own convention in early July and nominated Guthrie as their gubernatorial candidate.

The Populists held their state convention in August and, largely ignoring overt discussion of the Fusion issue, nominated a full slate of state candidates. Largely at the initiative of U.S. Senator Marion Butler, Guthrie was given the gubernatorial nomination with the hope that he could attract the votes of free silver Democrats. In September, the party's leaders formulated a Fusion agreement with the Republicans to defeat the Democrats. The agreement did not involve withdrawing Guthrie's candidacy, and rumors proliferated that Russell would withdraw from the race and thus allow the Guthrie to become the single Fusion candidate for governor. Guthrie, distrustful of the Republicans, was opposed to Fusion and doubted that Russell would ever withdraw, which Russell eventually confirmed to him in a private meeting.

Reassured by the national Democratic Party's embrace of free silver, Butler pushed for North Carolina Populists to repudiate their earlier agreement with Republicans and work with Democrats. State Democratic leaders offered to support Guthrie as a candidate for lieutenant governor or U.S. Senator but would not back a Populist for governor. Largely on this basis, the Populist leaders rejected cooperation with the Democrats, to Guthrie's dismay. With Russell and Guthrie remaining in the contest, the gubernatorial election evolved into a three-way race between the two of them and Democratic nominee Cyrus B. Watson. Watson and Guthrie largely ran similar campaigns, with both focusing on their support for presidential candidate William Jennings Bryan (who had been nominated by both the national Democratic and Populist parties), free silver, and largely ignoring state concerns. Many North Carolinian Populists were disturbed by Guthrie's strategy.

Though his nomination had not been formally impacted by the Fusion agreement between the Republicans and Populists, Guthrie felt he had been rejected by his own party. Seeking to avoid the election of a Republican, on October 27 he endorsed Watson and urged Populists to pursue Fusion with Democrats. Many Populists following him eventually divided their vote between Russell and Watson. Russell won the November election with 153,787 votes. Watson placed second with 145,266 votes, and Guthrie placed last with 31,143 votes, having earned a majority in only one county and underperforming the Populists' 1892 gubernatorial candidate. His break with his own party deeply embarrassed the Populists.

=== Later activities ===
In 1898, Guthrie joined the Democratic Party. He chaired a pro-Democrat "White Men's Mass Meeting" in Goldsboro during that year's election cycle.

== Later life ==
In his later life Guthrie avoided politics and focused on his law practice. His wife died in April 1915. He suffered a stroke in early October 1916. His health failed to improve and he died early in the morning on October 14 at his home in Durham. A funeral was held at St. Phillips Episcopal Church in Durham and his body was buried next to his wife in Fayetteville.

== Works cited ==
- Beeby, James M. (2008). Revolt of the Tar Heels: The North Carolina Populist Movement, 1890-1901. University Press of Mississippi. ISBN 9781604733242.
- Biographical sketches of the members of the legislature of North Carolina, session 1897. Raleigh: D. C. Mangum. 1897. OCLC 1041625672.
- Crow, Jeffrey J.; Durden, Robert F. (1977). Maverick Republican in the Old North State : A Political Biography of Daniel L. Russell. Baton Rouge: Louisiana State University Press. ISBN 9780807102916.
- Edmonds, Helen G. (2013). The Negro and Fusion Politics in North Carolina, 1894-1901 (revised ed.). Chapel Hill: The University of North Carolina Press. ISBN 9781469610955.
- Hunt, James L. (2003). Marion Butler and American Populism. Chapel Hill: University of North Carolina Press. ISBN 9780807862506.

Party political offices
Preceded by Wyatt P. Exum	Populist nominee for Governor of North Carolina; 1896	Vacant
