= Otway Burns =

American politician (c. 1775–1850)

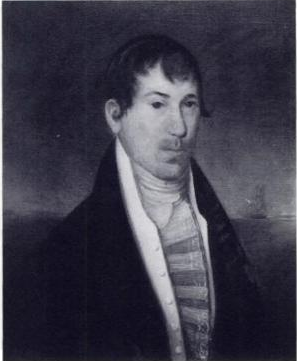

North Carolina General Assembly

Member of the U.S. House of Representatives from 's Carteret County district
- In office 1821 – (served 7 terms)

North Carolina Senate
- In office 4 terms – [date?]

Personal details
- Born: c. 1775 Queen's Creek, near Swansboro, North Carolina
- Died: August 25, 1850 Portsmouth, North Carolina
- Spouse(s): Joanna Grant, m. 1809, d. 1814; Jane Hall, m. 1814
- Relations: Grandson, Walter Francis Burns
- Children: Son, Owen, Daughter, Harriet Hall Burns (Born: February 28, 1827)
- Occupation: Privateer, shipbuilder, politician, businessman

Military service
- Allegiance: United States
- Branch/service: Privateer
- Rank: Captain
- Commands: Snap Dragon
- Wars: War of 1812

Otway Burns (c. 1775 – August 25, 1850) was an American privateer during the War of 1812 and later, a North Carolina State Senator.

== Early life ==
Burns was born at Queen's Creek, near Swansboro, North Carolina. He became a seaman after learning the trade at the ports in Swansboro and Beaufort, a nearby town situated in Carteret County. After acquiring the skills needed to become a merchant captain, Burns sailed along the East Coast of the United States, all the way north up to Maine. After his voyage, he married his cousin, Joanna Grant, on July 6, 1809. The next year, the couple moved to Swansboro. There, Joanna gave birth to Owen, the couple's only child.

Burns received financial support for his trading activities from Edward Pasteur, a physician and local political leader from New Bern. In the summer of 1812, just a month after the War of 1812 had commenced, Burns and Pasteur purchased a vessel in New York City for eight thousand US dollars, which Burns intended to use for privateering along the coast of The Carolinas. The 147-ton vessel, named Zephyr, had been constructed four years earlier on the West River in Maryland. Zephyr measured 85.5 feet (26.1 m) from bow to stern, had a beam of 22.5 feet (6.9 m) and a depth of almost nine feet (2.7 m). The vessel was armed with one pivot gun and between five and seven gun carriages. Also on board were a number of small arms: cutlasses, pistols, muskets, boarding pikes, pickaxes and blunderbusses. After rechristening the vessel as Snap Dragon, Burns and Pasteur obtained official letters of marque for the vessel in New York on August 27, 1812. After sailing back to New Bern, the men sold their 50 shares in the ship at a price of US$260 per share to eight other investors from New Bern, Tarboro and Edenton.

== Privateering career ==
Pasteur and Burns, on Snap Dragon, headed to New Bern to recruit men to join the vessel's crew. To their surprise, some of New Bern's political leaders treated privateering like piracy, and they tried to complicate matters for the two privateers. The leaders convinced new recruits to borrow money, upon which, they would be arrested for their debt. Burns twice retaliated against the politicians. In one incident, the crew of Snap Dragon sank a boat with constables who were planning on boarding the ship. Subsequently, a local attorney labeled the vessel as a "licensed robber". Burns responded by rowing to land and throwing the lawyer into a river.

With a 25-man crew, Burns left New Bern for Norfolk, Virginia. On October 14, 1812, Snap Dragon and another vessel, Revenge, sailed south. The vessels separated a week later.

Snap Dragon encountered success early in the cruise. In one situation, she outran a British frigate and sloop. A few days later, Snap Dragon captured its first prize, a British merchant ship armed with 14 guns. Soon after, Burns and Pasteur led the vessel to St. Thomas in the Virgin Islands. To fool enemy British ships, they disguised Snap Dragon as a merchant ship by putting up old, ragged sails and moving the guns out of view. Snap Dragon ran into five British men of war. One of the ships, the frigate HMS Garland, fired a warning shot and signaled the other ships to chase down Snap Dragon. For over two hours, Burns led Snap Dragon away from danger, toward Ship Rock passage, which unknowingly, was blocked by two British brigs. HMS Sophie immediately launched an attack on Snap Dragon. Burns told his crew to lie down on the deck while the vessel was being fired upon. Burns was able to escape from the British ships unscathed. The next morning, Burns and his crew encountered HMS Dominica, another British man of war, but again they successfully escaped. The crew of Snap Dragon made their way to St. Croix, where they made "several small captures" of coastal traders.

Burns commanded Snap Dragon on her next two cruises, during which he had several encounters with British men-of-war and took numerous prizes.

== Life after privateering ==
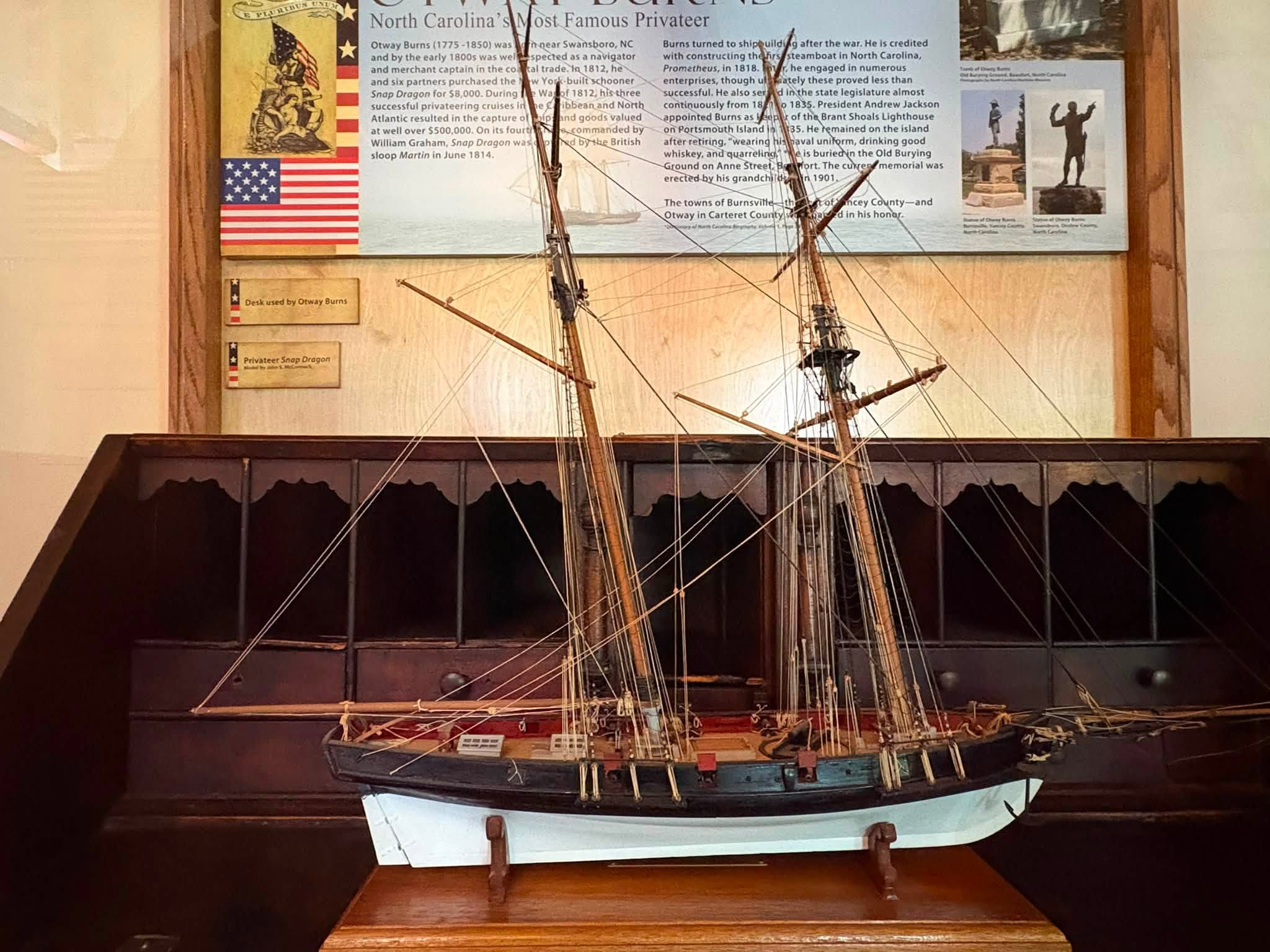
Display on Otway Burns in the Charles R. McNeill Library at the North Carolina Maritime Museum at Beaufort

Months before he completed his third cruise in 1814, Burns's wife Joanna and son Owen left him to live with relatives in Jones County. In September, Joanna died, leaving her son in the custody of her family for five years before Burns obtained legal guardianship over Owen.

Three months later, Burns married Jane Hall, a 20-year-old from Beaufort, North Carolina. In April 1815, Burns purchased a property in Beaufort, on which he built a house, that would be his family's residence for the next 20 years.

=== Business ===
From the wealth he gained from privateering, Burns became a shipbuilder at Swansboro, North Carolina, and made investments in local businesses. In 1818, he built Prometheus at his shipyard in Swansboro near the mouth of the White Oak River (NC Historical Marker #54), the first steamboat in North Carolina, which operated on the Cape Fear River. In 1823, he built Warrior in Beaufort, followed by the brig Henry, eight years later.

During much of the 1820s, he managed a store and taproom on his Beaufort property, and also had a partnership in a Taylor's Creek salt distribution company. Burns possessed a number of vessels, such as a schooner, seiner, sailboat and a mullet boat. Among other things, he also co-owned brick kilns used by the federal government to build Fort Macon, in the largest public works project in the history of the area, and enslaved 11 people, whose forced labor was used for his businesses and on his 340-acre (1.4 km^{2}) plantation in Carteret County.

=== Political career ===
Burns's political career started with his 1821 election to represent Carteret County in the North Carolina House of Commons and his appointment to serve as the commissioner of a local canal connecting Neuse and Newport Rivers. He served 11 terms in the legislature—seven in the House of Representatives and four in the Senate—over a course of 14 years.

=== Later life ===
In 1835 President Andrew Jackson appointed him keeper of the Brant Island Shoal Light, a position he held until his death. He is buried in the Old Burying Ground at Beaufort.

== Honors ==
Two destroyers have been named in his honor: USS Burns (DD-171) and USS Burns (DD-588), in service during World War I and II, respectively. In 1834, Burnsville, North Carolina was founded and named in his honor. A statue of him was placed in the town square in 1909. The town of Otway, in Carteret County, North Carolina, is also named for him. He has descendants living today in the areas of Beaufort, Swansboro and Atlantic Beach, North Carolina, and in the immediate area of his birth near Queens Creek, North Carolina.

Captain Burns's life is the basis of a historical novel by Ruth P. Barbour, The Cruise of the Snap Dragon.
