= Theophilus Weeks =

Early American settler

Theophilus Weeks (1708 – January 1772) was an early settler in the British colony of Province of North Carolina. He served as a soldier in the French and Indian War, and he was the founder of the town of Swansboro, North Carolina.

== Early life ==
Theophilus Weeks was born 1708 in Falmouth, Massachusetts. His parents were Benjamin and Mary Chase Weeks. In 1730, Benjamin Weeks moved the family to North Carolina, settling on Hadnots Creek.

At about the same time, another group from Falmouth, Jonathan Green, Sr., his brother Isaac Green, and their families, settled on the other side of the White Oak River, in what is now Onslow County (Onslow was formed from New Hanover and Carteret counties in 1734). The White Oak River forms the boundary between Onslow and Carteret counties.

Jonathan Green, Sr., died about 1735, at the age of about 35 years. On 7 October 1735, Theophilus Weeks married his widow, Grace, and moved into the Green plantation. In time, he bought out Isaac Green’s half interest in the property and the latter returned to Massachusetts. The plantation was located on the Onslow (west) side of the mouth of the White Oak River, and was named “The Wharf.” Theophilus and Grace had at least four children. It is likely that he must have had a daughter or two, although their names are not known. At a court held 5 April 1743, Theophilus proved rights for eight white persons belonging to his family.

The religious affiliation of Theophilus Weeks is not known, however, he is descended from the Reverend John Robinson, pastor of the Pilgrims in Holland. Considering that many other members of the Weeks family in the Hadnots Creek area were deeply involved in the early Baptist movement, it is probable that Theophilus Weeks and his family were among them.

In January 1741 (New Style), he recorded his livestock branding, which indicated agricultural interests. In 1747 he borrowed some £200 from Colonel John Starkey, and used the land he had purchased from Isaac Green as security. Weeks repaid this loan repaid by the end of the next year. Weeks received two land grants in Onslow County on 6 April 1745, for 100 acres (0.40 km^{2}) each. On 10 April 1761, four additional grants totaling 640 acres (2.6 km^{2}), and on 4 May 1769, an additional 31 acres (130,000 m^{2}) were received.

In 1754 the Onslow Regiment of Militia was organized in response to the French and Indian Wars. The regiment was divided into four companies, and Theophilus Weeks became a sergeant in Captain Stephen Lee’s company of Colonel John Starkey’s Onslow Regiment of Militia. He is listed on a unit roster dated 12 March 1754. It was to meet at Jonathan Milton’s residence on New River for a general muster.

In 1751 Weeks petitioned the Onslow Court for permission to operate an ordinary, and he did receive a license to “keep an ordinary at his now dwelling place.” The White Oak River flows into Bogue Inlet, and this suggests that port activity was thriving at the mouth of the river, and that the Weeks’ plantation was a favorite place for seafarers to visit. He was appointed inspector of exports for Bogue Inlet in 1757, and he held that position for the rest of his life.

== Origins of Swansboro ==
Probably the greatest accomplishment of his life came with the founding of the town of Swansboro. His plantation, The Wharf, was an ideal location for trade and navigation, and as commerce increased, he saw the advantage it offered as a seaport.

It is not known exactly when he decided to establish a town on his property. It is possible that he considered the idea for years. His plans were finalized early in 1771, or possibly the year before.

The settlement was laid out with six streets, and contained forty-eight lots. The lots were arranged in three tiers, with sixteen lots each. Three of the streets ran basically north and south, and the other three east and west. They are known today as Front, Water, Elm, Moore, Main (originally Broad), and Church Streets. A county road extended northeastward from Broad Street to the Onslow Courthouse (which no longer exists, as the Onslow county seat is now at Jacksonville). All the streets were thirty feet (9.1 m) wide, except Front and Broad Streets, which were 40 feet (12 m). All the original lots were 60 x 200 feet (61 m), except on the north side of Front Street. These seven water lots (numbers 10-16) extended across it to the river.

Sale of the lots went slowly, and only five of the forty-eight had been sold when Theophilus died. The Weeks home was on the west side of Broad Street (now Main), lot #7, somewhere between Front and Water Streets, just up from the wharf so he could see the ships as they came in. A dock was located nearby where ships tied up for him to inspect their cargo. Lot #6 was sold to Edward Starkey on 11 May 1771, and Lots #2 and #5 were sold to Ezekiel Hunter. Lot #11 was sold to Mrs. Mary Pitts, who received the deed for what was called "lot number 11 in the plan of a town laid out by Theophilus Weeks." One of the town’s original houses, that of Jonathan Green, Jr.’s son, Samuel, is still standing.

The town was known by several names during its early years. Some people referred to it as Weeks Point, Weeks Landing, Weeks Wharf, The Wharf, and others as New Town. In one petition, it is called "New Town upon Bogue." It was generally called Bogue during the Revolutionary War era. The confusion was finally settled in 1783, when it was incorporated and an act of the General Assembly officially named it Swansborough, in honor of Samuel Swann, Speaker of the colonial assembly and official representative of Onslow in the Assembly. The name was later shortened to Swansboro.

== Later life ==
The exact date and cause of Theophilus Weeks’ death are unknown. It was probably in early January, 1772. He last appears in the public records on 1 January 1772, when he and his wife sold 0.5-acre (2,000 m^{2}) to Archibald Gillespie. When the Onslow Court met a few days later, Gillespie was appointed inspector for Bogue Inlet, “in the room of Theophilus Weeks, deceased.” His wife, Grace, died in August 1792.

Swansboro celebrated its bicentennial in 1983. About 150 people were on hand, of whom 85 were descendants of him or his brother, Jabez. As part of the Fourth of July celebration, a memorial marker was dedicated to Theophilus Weeks as founder of Swansboro.
