= Alum Spring =

- U.S. National Register of Historic Places
- Location within North Carolina Location within the United States
- Location: SR 1211 1.6 mi. S of SR 1001, Catherine Lake, North Carolina
- Coordinates: 34°47′53″N 77°33′54″W
- Area: 14.9 acres (6.0 ha)
- Built: c. 1850
- MPS: Onslow County MPS
- NRHP reference No.: 89002349
- Added to NRHP: January 31, 1990

Alum Spring is a historic sulphur spring located at Catherine Lake, Onslow County, North Carolina. The spring was the site of the county poorhouse during the post-American Civil War period. After the poorhouse moved, the county-wide "Big August" picnic social gathering was held at Alum Spring until 1933.

It was listed on the National Register of Historic Places in 1990.
