= Swansboro Historic District =

Historic district in North Carolina, United States

- U.S. National Register of Historic Places
- U.S. Historic district
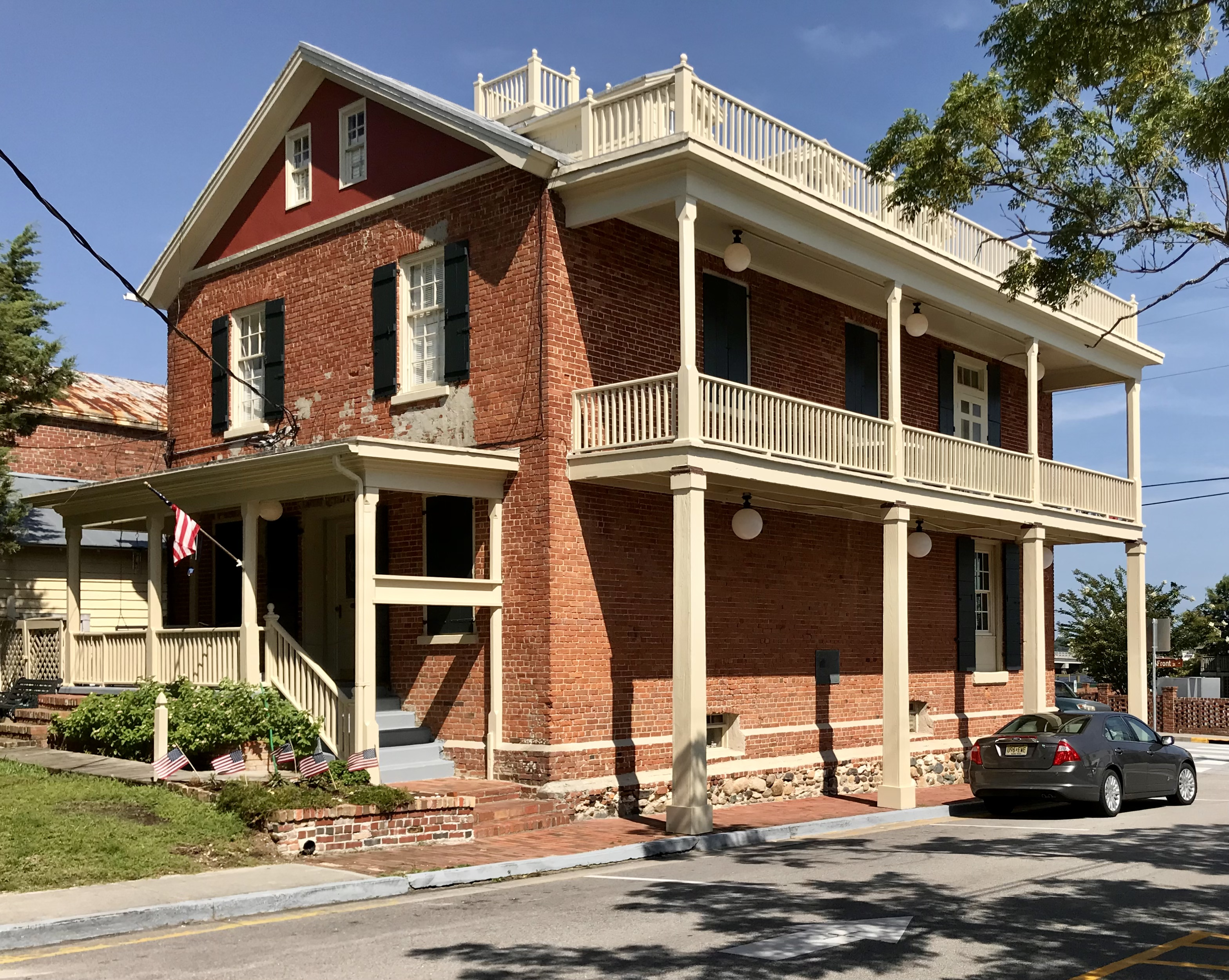
- William Pugh Ferrand Store

- Location within North Carolina Location within the United States
- Location: Roughly bounded by Walnut, Main, and Elm Sts., NC 24, White Oak River, and Church, Water, and Broad Sts., Swansboro, North Carolina
- Coordinates: 34°41′13″N 77°07′13″W
- Area: 30 acres (12 ha)
- Built: 1770
- Architect: Smith, Robert Lee
- Architectural style: Bungalow/craftsman, Greek Revival, Federal
- MPS: Onslow County MPS
- NRHP reference No.: 90000440
- Added to NRHP: March 16, 1990

Swansboro Historic District is a national historic district located at Swansboro, Onslow County, North Carolina. The district encompasses 74 contributing buildings and 1 contributing site in the central business district and surrounding residential sections of Swansboro. The district largely developed between 1890 and 1925 and includes notable examples of Federal, Greek Revival, and Bungalow / American Craftsman style architecture. Notable contributing buildings include the Jonathan Green House, Beaufort House, Bazel Hawkins House, George E. Bell House, James Elijah Parkin House (1893), William Pugh Ferrand Store (1839), the Robert Spence McLean Store, Watson and Parkin "double store" (1910), Jim Kennedy Fish House (1930s), Baptist Church (1897), and the Emmerton School (1920s).

It was listed on the National Register of Historic Places in 1990.
