= Yopps Meeting House =

Historic church in North Carolina, United States

- U.S. National Register of Historic Places
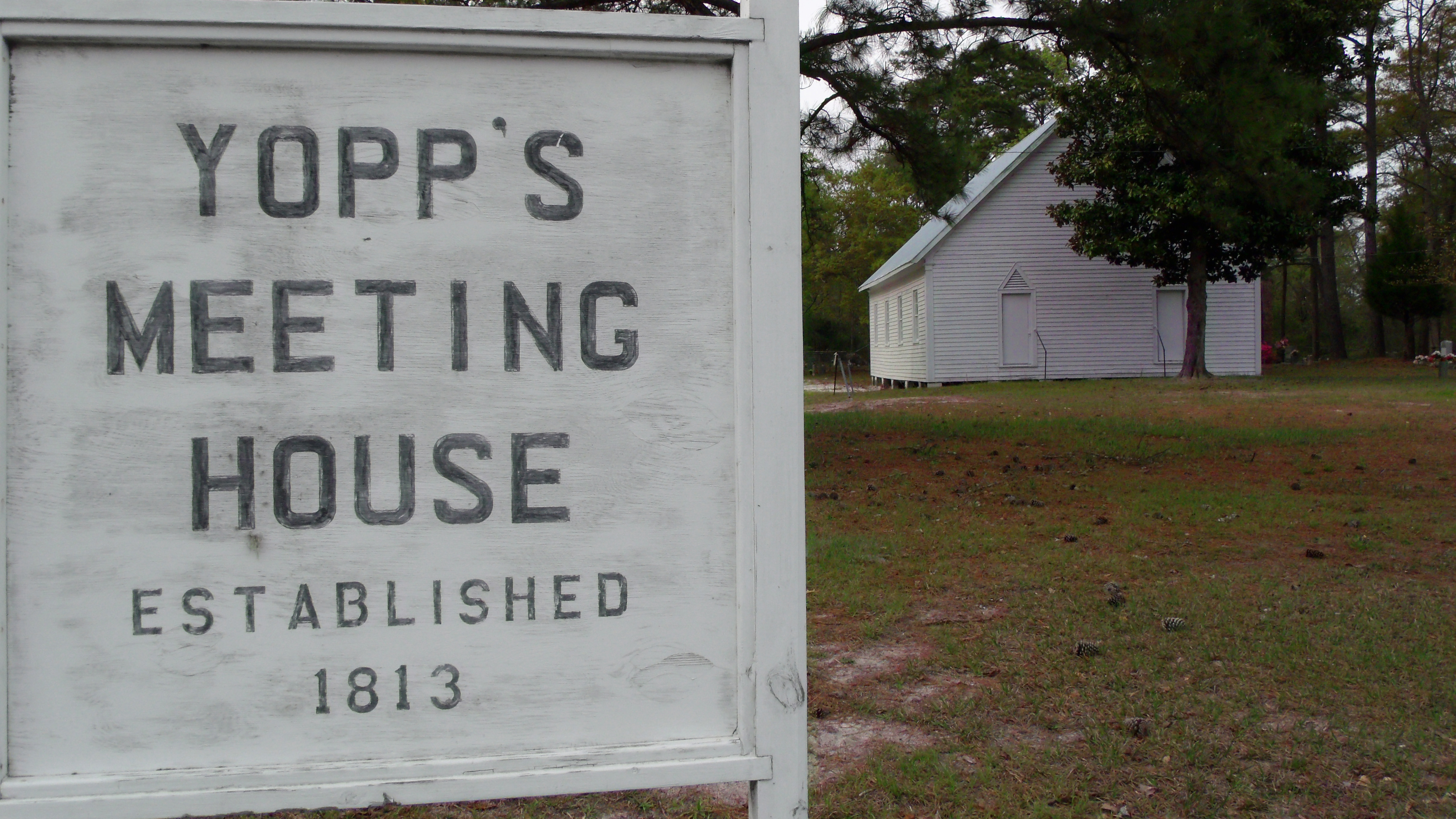

- Location within North Carolina Location within the United States
- Location: NC 172, jct. with Sneads Ferry Rd., near Sneads Ferry, North Carolina
- Coordinates: 34°33′30″N 77°24′16″W
- Area: 3.7 acres (1.5 ha)
- Built: 1890
- Architectural style: Greek Revival
- MPS: Onslow County MPS
- NRHP reference No.: 99000868
- Added to NRHP: July 22, 1999

Yopps Meeting House, also known as Yopps Primitive Baptist Church, is a historic Primitive Baptist church located at Sneads Ferry, Onslow County, North Carolina. The current building was built around 1890, however the Friends of Yopp's Meeting House organization claims there may have been a log precursor built as early as 1813. The meeting house is a one-story, rectangular, frame building with a steep, gable-front roof and Greek Revival style design elements. Also on the property are two contributing cemeteries, one for white and one for African-American parishioners. Some of the plots are surrounded by iron fencing.

It was listed on the National Register of Historic Places in 1999.
