= Alfred Moore Waddell =

American politician (1834–1912)

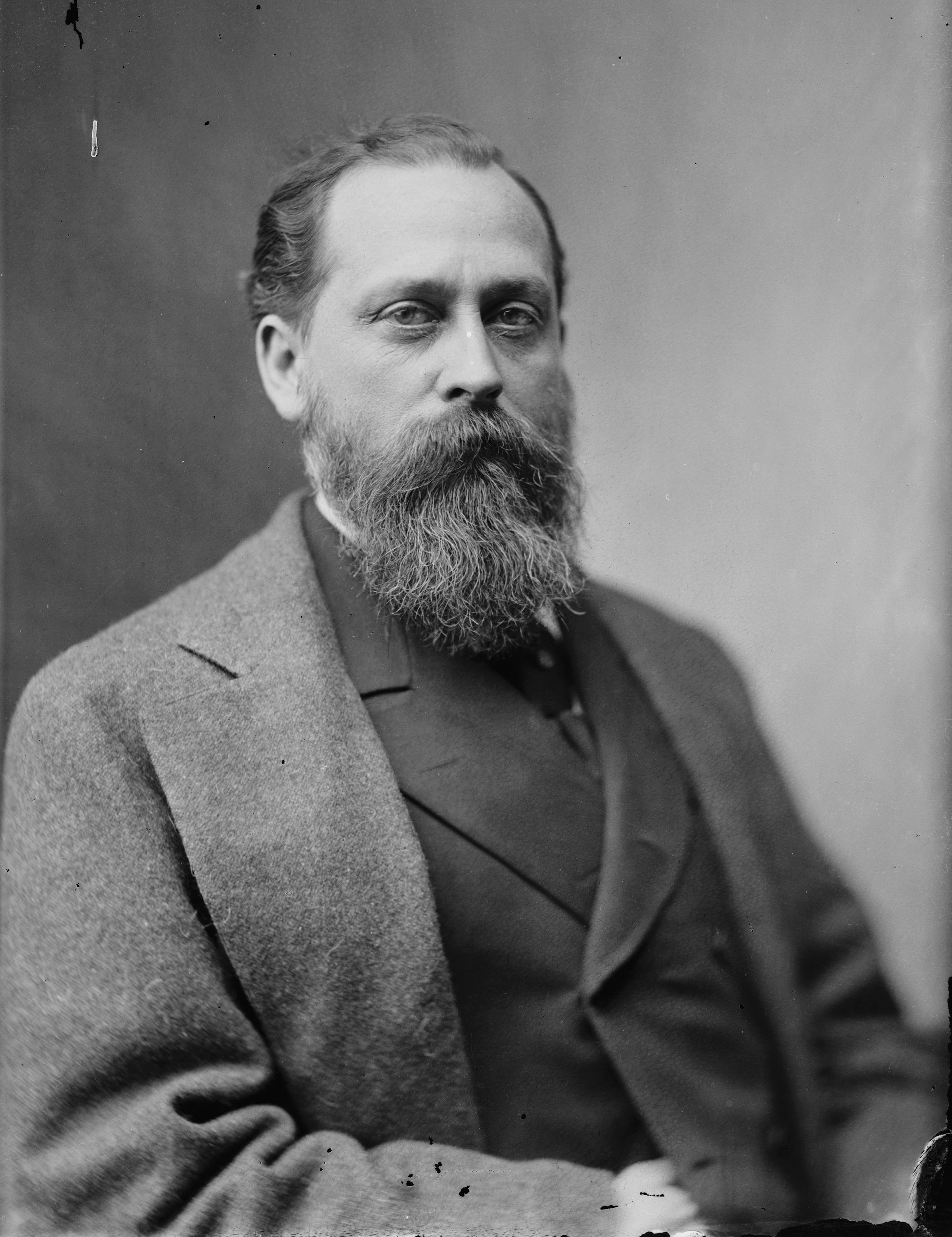
- Waddell c. 1865–1880

Mayor of Wilmington, North Carolina
- de facto, unlawful (Note: Waddell seized the office of mayor after holding his predecessor at gunpoint to force his resignation, as part of the Wilmington massacre.)
- In office November 10, 1898 – 1906
- Preceded by: Silas P. Wright
- Succeeded by: William E. Springer

Member of the U.S. House of Representatives from North Carolina's 3rd district
- In office March 4, 1871 – March 3, 1879
- Preceded by: Oliver H. Dockery
- Succeeded by: Daniel L. Russell

Personal details
- Born: September 16, 1834 Hillsborough, North Carolina, U.S.
- Died: March 17, 1912 (aged 77) Wilmington, North Carolina, U.S.
- Party: American (until 1860); Constitutional Union (1860–1861); Democratic (from 1870)
- Spouse(s): Julia Savage (1857); Ellen Savage (1878); Gabrielle de Rosset (1896)
- Relations: Hugh Waddell; Francis Nash; Alfred Moore
- Children: Elizabeth Savage; Alfred M. Waddell Jr.
- Occupation: politician, lawyer, publisher
- Known for: led only coup d'état on U.S. soil

Alfred Moore Waddell (September 16, 1834 – March 17, 1912) was an American politician. A member of the Democratic Party, he served as a U.S. representative from North Carolina between 1871 and 1879 and became mayor of Wilmington, North Carolina from 1898 to 1906, after he led the Wilmington insurrection and massacre of 1898.

Waddell was a leader of the Wilmington massacre of 1898, in which a violent, coordinated mob of about 2,000 white men massacred up to 90 African-Americans, destroyed the property and businesses of African-Americans, and overthrew the elected Fusion government of the city of Wilmington, North Carolina; and Waddell became mayor of Wilmington after holding his predecessor at gunpoint and forcing him to resign. This event is considered to be the only successful coup d'état to have taken place on U.S. soil, and helped to initiate an era of severe racial segregation and disenfranchisement of African-Americans throughout the South.

== Family and education ==
Waddell was born in Hillsboro, North Carolina, to Hugh Waddell, a prominent lawyer and president of the North Carolina Senate in 1836, and Susan Moore. He was the great-great-great-grandson of General Hugh Waddell, and great-grandson of both Brigadier General Francis Nash and U. S. Supreme Court Justice Alfred Moore. He attended Bingham's School and Caldwell Institute before enrolling in the University of North Carolina at Chapel Hill, graduating in 1853. After being admitted to the bar, he began practicing law in Wilmington in 1855. While he was a good lawyer, he was said to have not liked being one. In 1857, he married Julia Savage. They had two children – Elizabeth and Alfred Jr. Following Julia's death, he married her sister, Ellen Savage. Waddell also wedded a third time, marrying Gabrielle de Rosset, in 1896.

== Publisher ==
In July 1860, Waddell purchased the most influential Whig newspaper in the Cape Fear region, the Wilmington Daily Herald, and used it as a platform to promote his views opposing secession. He left publishing about a year later; however, he returned in 1881 and 1882, as editor of the Charlotte Journal. He left publishing for good, and returned to practicing law, in 1883. However, he would go on to author, and publish, several books including a biography of his great-great-grandfather, a historical work on the Cape Fear Region, and an autobiography published in 1908, "Some Memories of My Life."

== Military career ==
During The Civil War, Waddell joined the Confederacy as an adjutant, in 1861, rising to the rank of lieutenant colonel in the Third Cavalry, which later became known as the Forty-First North Carolina Regiment. His regiment bounced around throughout a stretched field of operations, executing duties as independent cavalry and rangers.

Waddell resigned in 1864 due to poor health.

== Political career ==
In 1856, Waddell supported the American Party and opposed secession in the years leading up to the Civil War. In 1860, he was a delegate to the Constitutional Union National Convention.

In 1870, Waddell ran for Congress as a Conservative Democrat. He was elected to the 42nd United States Congress; he was re-elected three times, serving on the Ku Klux Klan committee and as the chairman of the Committee on Post Offices and Post Roads during his final term. He was known as being one of the "ablest of the Southern members" of Congress until he was defeated for re-election by Daniel L. Russell in 1878.

Waddell remained active in the Democratic Party after his defeat, becoming a highly sought after political speaker and campaigner. He was a delegate to the Democratic National Conventions in 1880, where he supported Union General Winfield Scott Hancock for president and was also a member of the platform committee. In 1888, he was an elector-at-large and canvassed for Grover Cleveland's presidential campaign. In 1896, he was, again, a delegate at the 1896 Democratic National Convention. And when a statewide White Supremacy campaign began, in 1898, Waddell was at its forefront, in Wilmington.

== Leader in the "Party of the White Man" ==
=== Background ===
Following The Civil War, in 1868, North Carolina ratified the 14th Amendment, resulting in the recognition of Reconstruction, and in the state legislature and governorship falling under Republican rule. Democrats greatly resented this "radical" change, which they deemed as being brought about by blacks, Unionist carpetbaggers, and race traitors. Democrats developed a plan to restore "home rule," which was a return to the antebellum status quo. They began circumventing legislation by taking over the state's judiciary, and adopted 30 amendments to the state constitution including lowering the number of judges on the state supreme court, putting the lower courts and local governments under the control of the state legislature, rescinding the votes of certain types of criminals, mandating segregated public schools, outlawing interracial relationships and granting the General Assembly the power to modify or nullify any local government. By adopting these things, the Conservative Democrats became celebrated as bastions for white Americans. However, their control was largely limited to the western part of the state, within counties where there were few blacks.

As the Democrats chipped away at Republican rule, things came to a head with the 1876 gubernatorial campaign of Zebulon B. Vance, a former Confederate soldier and governor. Vance called the Republican party "begotten by a scalawag out of a mulatto and born in an outhouse." Through Vance, the Democrats saw their biggest opening to begin implementing their agenda in the eastern part of the state.

However, in that region, poor white cotton farmers, fed up with the capitalism of big banks and railroad companies, had aligned themselves with the labor movement. They had turned on the Democratic Party, founding The People's Party (also known as The Populists). As the US plunged into an economic depression, the Populists banded with black Republicans who shared their hardships, forming an interracial coalition with a platform of self-governance, free public education and equal voting rights for black men, called the Fusion Coalition.

In the 1894 and 1896, the Fusion party won every statewide office, including the governorship. This shift of power horrified white Democrats, who sought to capitalize on some cracks between the Fusion alliance, of black Republicans and white Populists, that began to show in 1898.

=== Rise to leadership ===
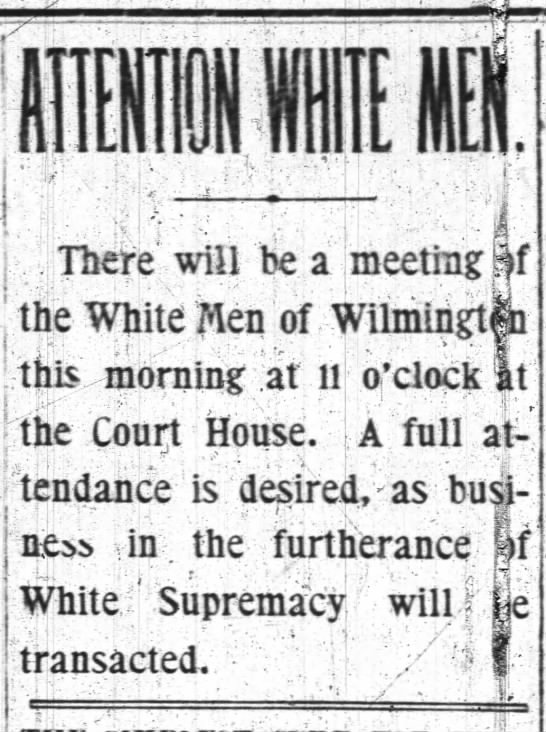
"Wilmington Messenger." Nov. 9, 1898

Democratic Party Chairman, Furnifold Simmons, was tasked with developing a strategy for the Democrats 1898 campaign. He decided to build a campaign around the issue of white supremacy.

Simmons created a speakers bureau, stacking it with talented orators who he could deploy to deliver the message across the state. One of those orators was Waddell, a skilled speaker, who had developed a reputation as "the silver tongued orator of the east" and as an "American Robespierre."

Waddell aligned with the Democrats and their campaign to "redeem North Carolina from Negro domination." With the aid of Josephus Daniels, the editor of the influential Raleigh newspaper, News & Observer, Waddell, and the other orators, began inciting white citizens with sexualized images of black men, insinuating their uncontrollable lust for white women, running newspaper stories and delivering speeches of "black beasts" who threatened to deflower white women.

Leading up to the November election, in August 1898, white men began to abandon the Fusion coalition when Alexander Manly, the owner of Wilmington's sole black newspaper, "The Daily Record," wrote an editorial responding to a speech supporting lynchings, by printing that many white women were not raped by black men, but willingly slept with them. This provided an opening for Democrats, now referring to themselves as "The "white man's party," as "evidence" supporting their claims of predatory blacks.

In a packed Wilmington auditorium, while sharing the stage with 50 of the city's most prominent white men, such as Robert Glenn, Thomas Jarvis, Cameron Morrison and Charles Aycock, Waddell declared that white supremacy was the only issue of importance for white men, and advocated punishment for race-traitors. However, Waddell set himself apart from the other speakers through his rousing ability to incite through propaganda, which he cemented with a blistering closing to his speech when he proclaimed, "We will never surrender to a ragged raffle of Negroes, even if we have to choke the Cape Fear River with carcasses."

His closing became a rallying cry. Portions of it were printed, sent around the state, and "quoted by speakers on every stump." Waddell's speech had made Wilmington a cause for all white men. Shortly after delivering it, The Red Shirts began riding through the state, on horseback, terrorizing black citizens and voters.

=== Leader ===
Following Waddell's speech, the "Secret Nine" – nine elite men who were funding the White Supremacist Campaign – tapped Waddell to lead a "Committee of Twenty-Five." The committee was tasked with "directing the execution of the provisions of the resolutions" within "The White Declaration of Independence," a document authored by the Secret Nine which called for the removal of voting rights for blacks, and for the overthrow of the newly elected interracial government.

With his new power, Waddell delivered speeches across the state to galvanize white men, such as the one he delivered in Goldsboro to crowd of 8,000.

The day before the election, Waddell excited a large crowd at Thalian Hall when he told them:

"You are Anglo-Saxons. You are armed and prepared and you will do your duty ... Go to the polls tomorrow, and if you find the negro out voting, tell him to leave the polls and if he refuses, kill him, shoot him down in his tracks. We shall win tomorrow if we have to do it with guns."

Democrats won the election in Wilmington by 6,000 votes, a sizable shift from the Fusion Party's 5,000-vote edge just two years prior. However, the Fusion Party remained intact in Wilmington, the North Carolina city with the greatest concentration of black wealth and economic power.

On November 9, Waddell went to the county courthouse where he unveiled The White Declaration of Independence with its goal of "asserting the supremacy of the white man." He proclaimed, to the raucous crowd of 600, that the U.S. Constitution "did not anticipate the enfranchisement of an ignorant population of African origin," that "never again will white men of New Hanover County permit black political participation" that "the Negro stop antagonizing our interests in every way, especially by his ballot," and that the city "give to white men a large part of the employment heretofore given to Negroes."

== Wilmington massacre ==
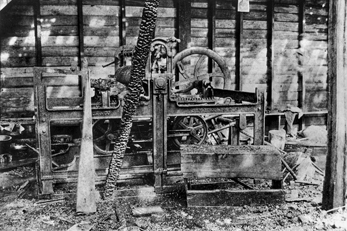
Remains of "The Daily Record", 1898

The following morning, Nov. 10th, Waddell helmed a well-coordinated government overthrow, coinciding with other violence occurring around the state.

At 8:15am, Waddell accompanied about 2,000 white men to the Wilmington armory. After heavily arming themselves with rifles, and a $1,200 Gatling gun, they then went to the two-story publishing office of "The Daily Record." For publishing a "defamatory" article about white women, the mob broke into Manley's publishing press, vandalized the premises, doused the wood floors with kerosene, set the building on fire, and gutted the remains. At the same time, black newspapers all over the state were also being destroyed. In addition, blacks, along with white Republicans, were denied entrance to city centers throughout the state.

Following the fire, white vigilantes went into black Wilmington neighborhoods, destroying black businesses and property, and assaulting black inhabitants with a mentality of killing "every damn nigger in sight."

As the violence spread, Waddell lead a group to Republican Mayor Silas P. Wright. Waddell forced Wright, the board of aldermen, and the police chief to resign at gunpoint. Around 4:00pm, Waddell was declared Wilmington's mayor, a position he retained until 1906.

It is estimated that, by the end of the day, Waddell's orders led to the murder of between 60 and 300 black people, and to the banishment of about 20 more.

== "Race riot" ==
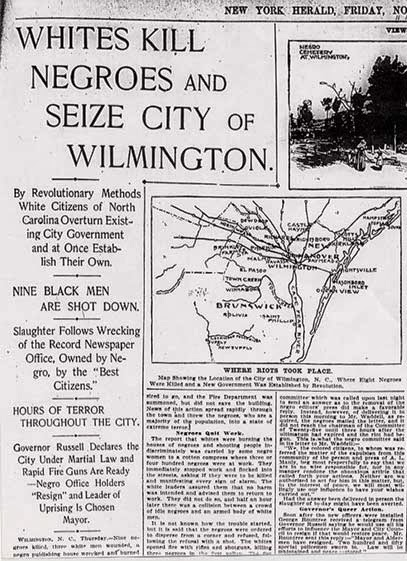
New York Herald - Nov. 11, 1898

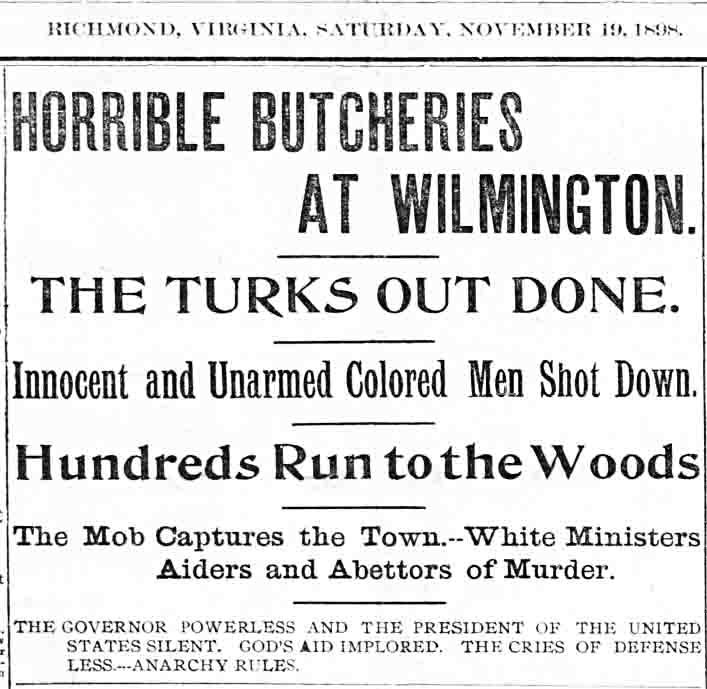
Wilmington coup, described in the Richmond Planet. Nov. 19, 1898

On November 26, 1898, Collier's Weekly published an article in which Waddell wrote about the government overthrow entitled, "The Story of The Wilmington, North Carolina, Race Riots"

Despite vowing to "choke the Cape Fear River with carcasses," and the fact that some members of the white mob posed for a photograph in front of the charred remnants of "The Daily Record," Waddell painted himself in the article as a reluctant non-violent leader – or accidental hero – "called upon" to lead under "intolerable conditions." He painted the white mob not as murderous lawbreakers, but as peaceful, law-abiding citizens who simply wanted to restore law and order. He also portrayed any violence committed by whites as either being accidental or executed in self-defense, effectively laying blame on both sides:

"Demand was made for the negroes to reply to our ultimatum to them [to destroy the black newspaper and leave town forever, or have it destroyed/be removed by force], and their reply was delayed or sent astray (whether purposely or not, I do not know), and that caused all the trouble. The people came to me. Although two other men were in command, they demanded that I should lead them. I took my Winchester rifle, assumed my position at the head of the procession, and marched to the "Record" office. We designed merely to destroy the press. I took a couple of men to the door, when our demand to open was not answered, and burst it in. Not I personally, for I have not the strength, but those with me did it.

We wrecked the [newspaper] house. I believe that the fire which occurred was purely accidental; it certainly was unintentional on our part...

I then marched the column back through the streets down to the armory, lined them up, and stood on the stoop and made a speech to them. I said: "Now you have performed the duty which you called on me to lead you to perform. now let us go quietly to our homes, and about our business, and obey the law, unless we are forced, in self-defense, to do other wise." I came home...In about an hour, or less time, the trouble commenced over in the other end of town, by the negroes starting to come over here. I was not there at the time...

Then they got seven of the negro leaders, brought them downtown, and put them in jail. I had been elected mayor by that time. It was certainly the strangest performance in American history, though we literally followed the law, as the Fusionists made it themselves. There has not been a single illegal act committed in the change of government. Simply, the old board went out, and the new board came in — strictly according to law. In regard to those men who had been brought to the jail a crowd said that they intended to destroy them; that they were the leaders, and that they were going to take the men out of the jail...I stayed up the whole night myself, and the forces stayed up all night, and we saved those wretched creatures' lives.

I waited until next morning at nine o'clock and then I made the troops form a hollow square in front of the jail. We placed the scoundrels in the midst of the square and marched them to the railroad station. I bought and gave them tickets to Richmond, and told them to go and to never show up again. That bunch were all negroes...

The negroes here have always professed to have faith in me. When I made the speech in the Opera House they were astounded. One of the leaders said: 'My God! when so conservative a man as Colonel Waddell talks about filling the river with dead niggers, I want to get out of town!' Since this trouble many negroes have come to me and said they are glad I have taken charge...

As to the government we have established, it is a perfectly legal one. The law, passed by the Republican Legislature itself, has been complied with. There was no intimidation used in the establishment of the present city government. The old government had become satisfied of their inefficiency and utterly helpless imbecility, and believed if they did not resign they would be run out of town...

I believe the negroes are as much rejoiced as the white people that order has been evolved out of chaos."

Waddell's account, and his effective label of "race riot," ignored the fact that the overthrow was a carefully planned conspiracy, turned the coup into an event that "spontaneously happened," helped usher in the Solid South, and set the precedent for the application of the term "race riot," that is still used today. He defined the historical narrative of the coup.

== Death ==
Waddell died in Wilmington in 1912. Newspapers reported that he suffered an "attack of angina pectoris" or a heart attack. His funeral was held in Saint James' episcopal Church in Wilmington. He is buried in Oakdale cemetery, Wilmington.

U.S. House of Representatives
Preceded by Oliver H. Dockery	Member of the U.S. House of Representatives from North Carolina's 3rd congressional district 1871–1879	Succeeded by Daniel L. Russell
