= Futral Family Farm =

Historic farm in North Carolina, United States

- U.S. National Register of Historic Places
- U.S. Historic district
- Location within North Carolina Location within the United States
- Location: SR 1210, 1 miles SE of jct. with SR 1209, near Fountain, North Carolina
- Coordinates: 34°48′28″N 77°38′12″W
- Area: 48.5 acres (19.6 ha)
- Built: c. 1885, 1906
- Built by: Futral, David; Futral, Amos
- Architectural style: Coastal plain cottage
- MPS: Onslow County MPS
- NRHP reference No.: 89001851
- Added to NRHP: November 13, 1989

Futral Family Farm is a historic farm complex and national historic district located in Richlands, Onslow County, North Carolina. The main house was built about 1885, and is a one-story saddle-notched log hall-parlor plan dwelling. It was enlarged about 1906, with the addition of a frame garret, side room, rear shed rooms, and a semi-detached kitchen and dining room to form a coastal plain cottage with an engaged front porch.

It was listed on the National Register of Historic Places in 1989.
