= Avirett–Stephens Plantation =

Historic district in North Carolina, United States

- U.S. National Register of Historic Places
- U.S. Historic district
- Location within North Carolina Location within the United States
- Location: US 258/24 .25 miles N of NC 1227, near Richlands, North Carolina
- Coordinates: 34°51′04″N 77°32′07″W
- Area: 83 acres (34 ha)
- Built: 1851
- Architectural style: Greek Revival
- MPS: Onslow County MPS
- NRHP reference No.: 91000465
- Added to NRHP: April 18, 1991

Avirett–Stephens Plantation is a historic slave plantation complex and national historic district located near Richlands, Onslow County, North Carolina. The plantation house was built in 1851, and is a two-story, five-bay, double-pile Greek Revival style frame dwelling. It is sheathed in pine board-and-batten and sits on a brick pier foundation. It features a wide two-tiered porch with a shallow hipped roof. Other contributing resources are antebellum cistern, family cemetery, and surrounding farmland.

It was listed on the National Register of Historic Places in 1991.
