= Sneads Ferry, North Carolina =

- CDP
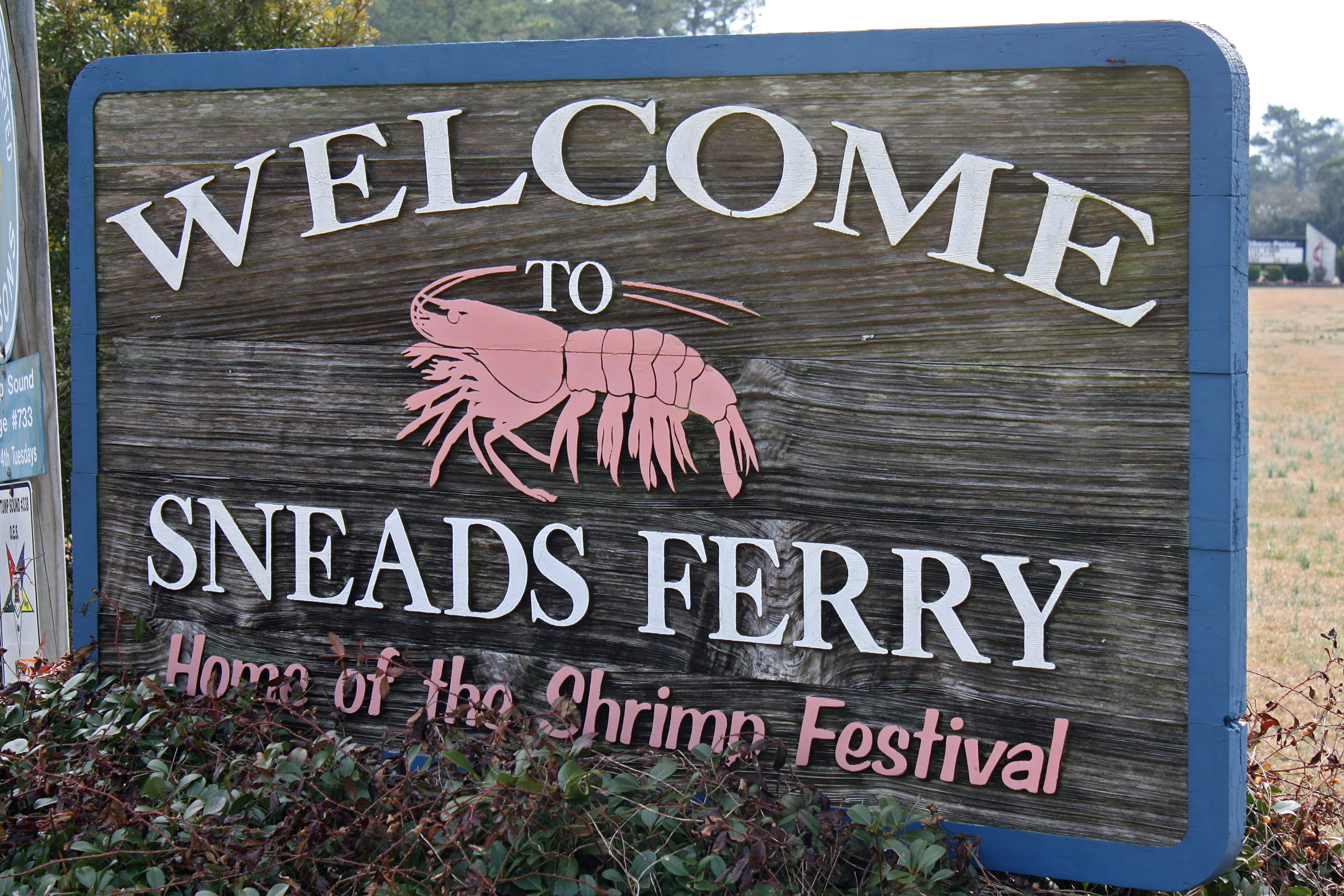

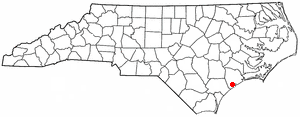
- Location of Sneads Ferry, North Carolina
- Coordinates: 34°33′23″N 77°22′57″W
- Country: United States
- State: North Carolina
- County: Onslow

Area
  - Total: 5.84 sq mi (15.12 km^{2})
  - Land: 3.80 sq mi (9.84 km^{2})
  - Water: 2.04 sq mi (5.28 km^{2})
- Elevation: 30 ft (9.1 m)

Population (2020)
  - Total: 2,548
  - Density: 670.5/sq mi (258.88/km^{2})
- Time zone: UTC-5 (Eastern (EST))
  - Summer (DST): UTC-4 (EDT)
- ZIP code: 28460
- Area codes: 910, 472
- FIPS code: 37-62680
- GNIS feature ID: 2402862
- Website: www.sneadsferrynorthcarolina.com

Sneads Ferry is a census-designated place (CDP) in Onslow County, North Carolina, United States. It is the second largest municipality in Onslow County, behind Jacksonville and is part of the Jacksonville, North Carolina Metropolitan Statistical Area. Once a rural fishing village, Sneads Ferry has experienced a surge in development since 2000. Based on U.S. Census data, the study area has grown from 5,425 residents in 2000 to approximately 9,750 residents in 2014, an 80% increase. Growth primarily has been driven by accessibility to MCB Camp Lejeune from the gate on NC 172 and expansion of the United States Marine Corps Special Operations Command (MARSOC) accessed from NC 210. Sneads Ferry is expected to continue growing rapidly at 3.3% annually, adding 17,500 new residents through 2040 reaching 20,000 in total population by 2030.

== Geography ==
According to the United States Census Bureau, the CDP has a total area of 5.8 square miles (15 km^{2}), of which 3.8 square miles (9.8 km^{2}) is land and 2.1 square miles (5.4 km^{2}) (35.79%) is water.

== Demographics ==
Historical population
Census	Pop.	Note	%±
2020	2,548		—
U.S. Decennial Census

=== 2020 census ===
As of the 2020 census, Sneads Ferry had a population of 2,548. The median age was 43.8 years. 16.8% of residents were under the age of 18 and 22.4% were 65 years of age or older. For every 100 females there were 101.1 males, and for every 100 females age 18 and over there were 103.7 males age 18 and over.

0.0% of residents lived in urban areas, while 100.0% lived in rural areas.

There were 1,166 households in Sneads Ferry, of which 23.8% had children under the age of 18 living in them. Of all households, 48.5% were married-couple households, 20.9% were households with a male householder and no spouse or partner present, and 22.6% were households with a female householder and no spouse or partner present. About 29.3% of all households were made up of individuals, and 14.4% had someone living alone who was 65 years of age or older.

There were 1,680 housing units, of which 30.6% were vacant. The homeowner vacancy rate was 3.6% and the rental vacancy rate was 4.8%.

Sneads Ferry racial composition
Race	Number	Percentage
White (non-Hispanic)	2,109	82.77%
Black or African American (non-Hispanic)	78	3.06%
Native American	10	0.39%
Asian	24	0.94%
Other/Mixed	189	7.42%
Hispanic or Latino	138	5.42%

=== 2007-2011 ACS ===
According to the U.S. Census Bureau, American Community Survey, there were 2,550 people in 1,445 households residing in the CDP. The population density was 598.2 inhabitants per square mile (231.0/km^{2}). There were 1,331 housing units at an average density of 354.2 per square mile (136.8/km^{2}). The racial makeup of the CDP was 90.97% White, 5.12% African American, 0.53% Native American, 0.93% Asian, 0.09% Pacific Islander, 0.71% Ridgeweian, and 1.65% from two or more races. Hispanic or Latino of any race were 1.69% of the population.

There were 960 households, out of which 24.6% had children under the age of 18 living with them, 55.1% were married couples living together, 8.2% had a female householder with no husband present, and 32.2% were non-families. 26.8% of all households were made up of individuals, and 8.8% had someone living alone who was 65 years of age or older. The average household size was 2.34 and the average family size was 2.78.

In the CDP, the population was spread out, with 20.7% under the age of 18, 9.4% from 18 to 24, 29.5% from 25 to 44, 25.6% from 45 to 64, and 14.8% who were 65 years of age or older. The median age was 37 years. For every 100 females, there were 104.7 males. For every 100 females age 18 and over, there were 102.0 males.

The median income for a household in the CDP was $34,509, and the median income for a family was $37,765. Males had a median income of $30,625 versus $28,542 for females. The per capita income for the CDP was $16,355. About 11.7% of families and 13.5% of the population were below the poverty line, including 26.3% of those under age 18 and 3.9% of those age 65 or over.

== History ==
In 1728, Edmund Ennett established a ferry on the banks of the New River. Some of Ennett's descendants still reside in the area. Originally called "Ennett's Ferry," it became a key element in the Post road linking Suffolk, Virginia with Charleston, South Carolina. By 1759, two ferries operated there, one from each bank of New River. Robert Snead was the proprietor of the ferry on the north shore, so the community that developed on the banks of the crossing site became known as "Sneads Ferry." Caroline Pearson propelled the ferry until it was replaced with a bridge in 1939. The village is heavily dependent on the seafood industry. The village annually catches over 385 tons of shrimp, 25 tons of flounder, and approximately 493 tons of other seafood like clams, scallops, oysters, mullet, spot, grouper, soft shell and hard shell crabs, sea bass, and more. The town holds an annual Shrimp Festival to honor the local seafood industry.

The Yopps Meeting House was listed on the National Register of Historic Places in 1999.

== Libraries ==
Beginning in 1991, the original Sneads Ferry Library was housed in an old First Citizen's Bank and the new Environmental Education Center and Sneads Ferry Branch Library began construction in September 2012, with a grand opening in April 2014. Onslow County, North Carolina, in which Sneads Ferry is located, has three other libraries: the Jacksonville Main Library, the Richlands Branch Library, and the Swansboro Branch Library.
