= William Edward Mattocks House =

Historic house in North Carolina, United States

- U.S. National Register of Historic Places
- Location within North Carolina Location within the United States
- Location: 109 Front St., Swansboro, North Carolina
- Coordinates: 34°41′14″N 77°7′5″W
- Area: 0.4 acres (0.16 ha)
- Built: 1901, 1931
- Architect: Mattocks, William Edward; Smith, Robert Lee
- Architectural style: Colonial Revival, Vernacular Colonial Revival
- NRHP reference No.: 89000166
- Added to NRHP: March 22, 1989

William Edward Mattocks House is a historic home located at Swansboro, Onslow County, North Carolina. It was started in 1901 and completed in the 1910s. It is a 1 1/2-story, Colonial Revival style frame dwelling. It has board-and-batten siding, a steeply pitched gable roof with dormers, and two-tier engaged porch. Also on the property is a similar 1 1/2-story frame house built about 1931 and operated as a cafe.

It was listed on the National Register of Historic Places in 1989.
