= Palo Alto Plantation (Palopato, North Carolina) =

Historic house in North Carolina, United States

- U.S. National Register of Historic Places
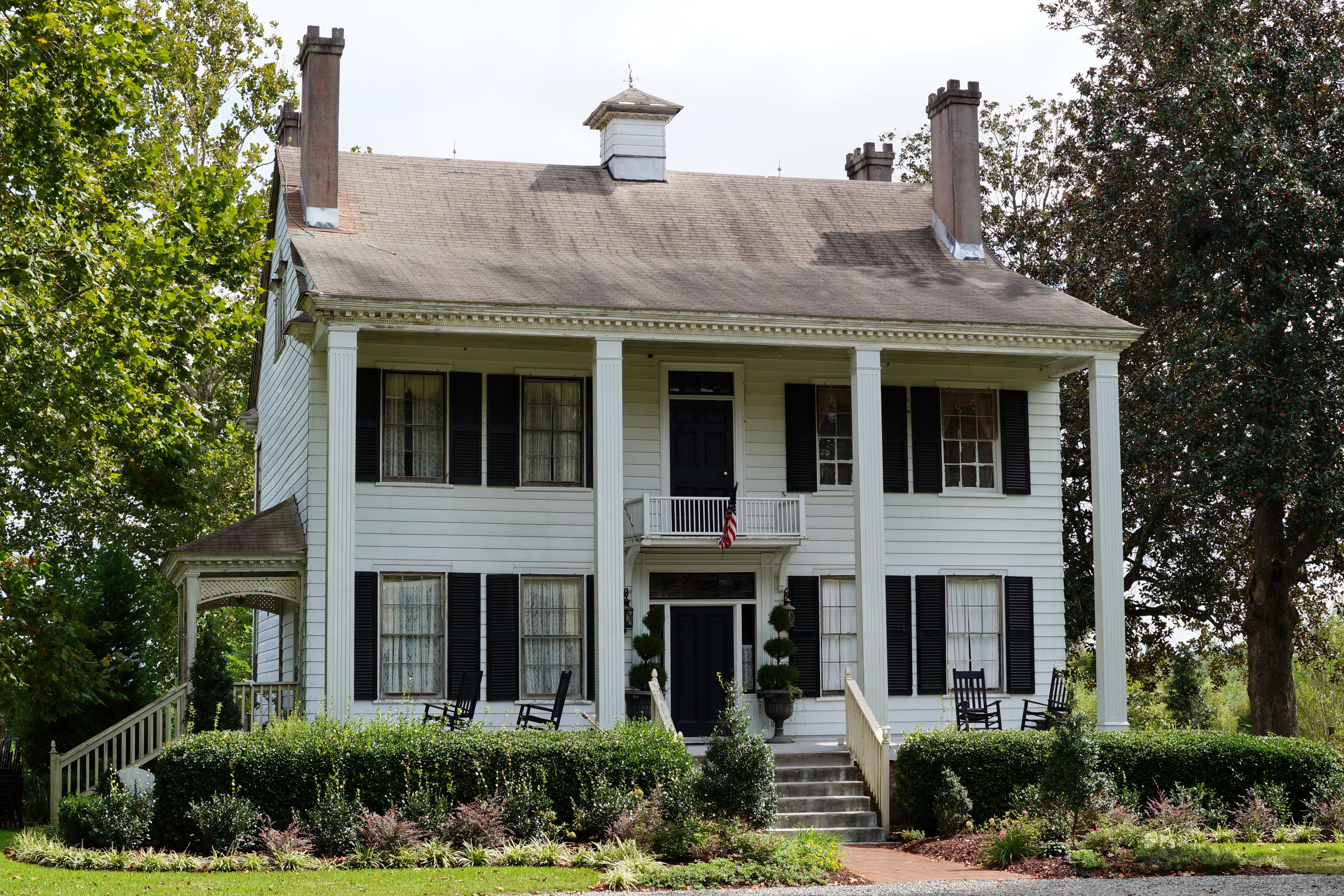
- Palo Alto Plantation, September 2014

- Location within North Carolina Location within the United States
- Location: SR 1434, Palopato, North Carolina
- Coordinates: 34°48′02″N 77°12′49″W
- Area: 25 acres (10 ha)
- Built: 1836-1840
- Architectural style: Greek Revival, Federal
- NRHP reference No.: 79003338
- Added to NRHP: October 10, 1979

Palo Alto Plantation is a historic plantation house located at Palopato, Onslow County, North Carolina. It was built between about 1836 and 1840, and is a two-story, five-bay, double-pile frame dwelling with vernacular Federal and Greek Revival style design elements. It has a gable roof with cupola, two-tiered engaged porch, and Palladian windows on the gable ends. It was the childhood home of Daniel L. Russell Jr. (1845–1908), governor of North Carolina, 1897–1901.

It was listed on the National Register of Historic Places in 1979.
