= Fountaintown, North Carolina =

Unincorporated community in North Carolina, US

Fountaintown
- Unincorporated community
- Location within North Carolina Location within the United States
- Coordinates: 34°50′28″N 77°40′22″W
- Country: United States
- State: North Carolina
- County: Duplin
- Founded: by the Fountain family

Fountaintown is an unincorporated community in Duplin County, North Carolina, United States.

The town's name is sometimes written as two words, Fountain Town, or simply as Fountain. Fountaintown was founded by the Fountain family from a land grant from the King of England.

The Futral Family Farm was listed on the National Register of Historic Places in 1989.
