= Venters Farm Historic District =

Historic farm in North Carolina, United States

- U.S. National Register of Historic Places
- U.S. Historic district
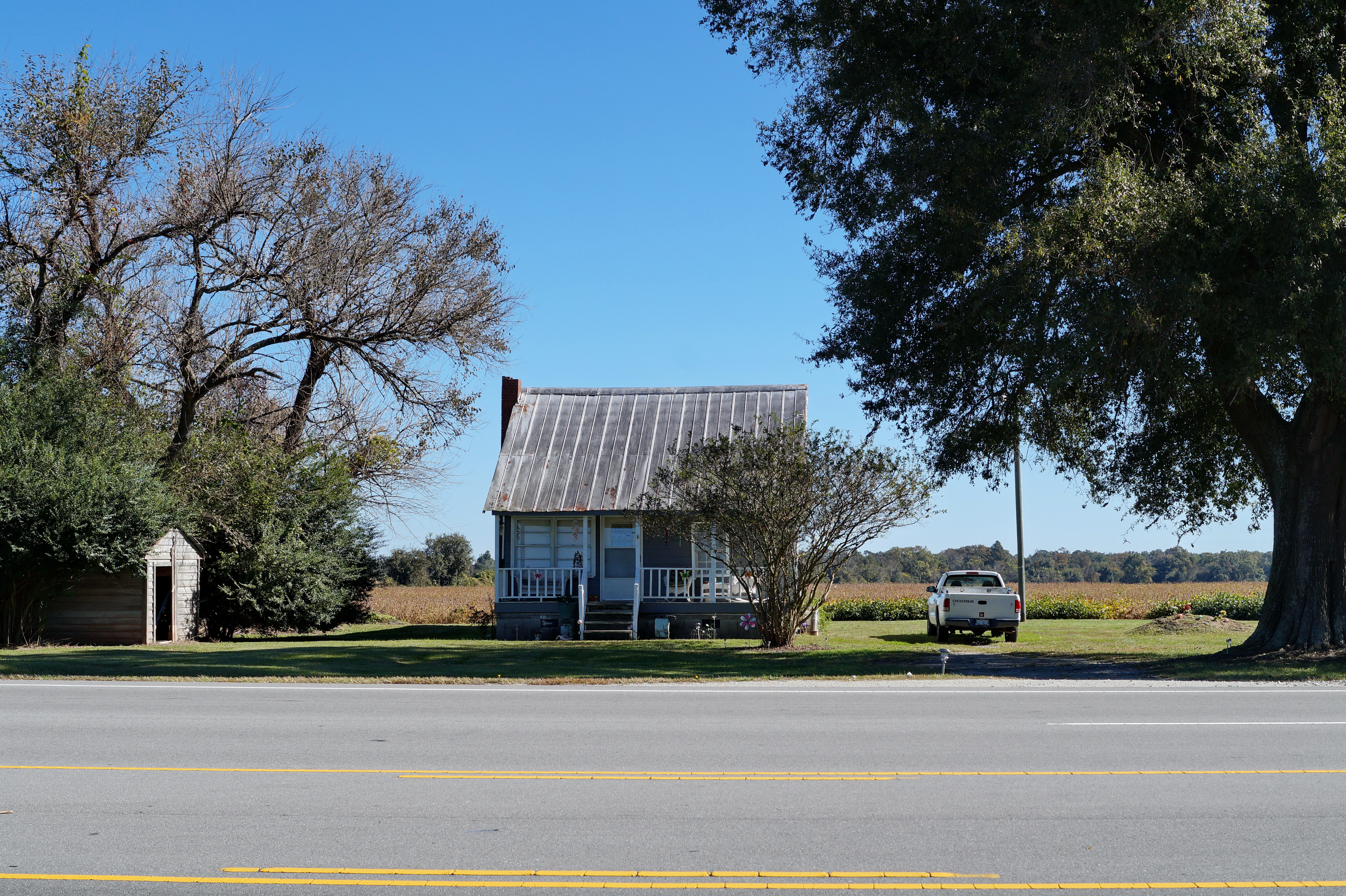
- Tenant House, Venters Farm Historic District, October 2014

- Location within North Carolina Location within the United States
- Location: US 258 and NC 1229, near Richlands, North Carolina
- Coordinates: 34°51′46″N 77°32′56″W
- Area: 536 acres (217 ha)
- NRHP reference No.: 86003504
- Added to NRHP: May 7, 1987

Venters Farm Historic District is a historic farm complex and national historic district located near Richlands, Onslow County, North Carolina. The complex includes 23 contributing buildings. The main house was built about 1896, and is two-story frame, late Victorian farm house with a detached kitchen. Other contributing buildings include a corn barn (c. 1896), a carriage house (c. 1896), a smokehouse (c. 1896), mule / hay barn (c. 1920s), cow / pig barn (c. 1920s), eight tobacco barns, a brooder house (c. 1946), and seven tenant houses.

It was listed on the National Register of Historic Places in 1987.
