= Catherine Lake Historic District =

Historic district in North Carolina, United States

- U.S. National Register of Historic Places
- U.S. Historic district
- Location within North Carolina Location within the United States
- Location: Jct. SR 1001 and 1211, Catherine Lake, North Carolina
- Coordinates: 34°49′01″N 77°33′44″W
- Area: 19 acres (7.7 ha)
- Built: c. 1850-1900
- Architectural style: Greek Revival, Italianate
- MPS: Onslow County MPS
- NRHP reference No.: 89001853
- Added to NRHP: November 13, 1989

Catherine Lake Historic District is a national historic district located at Catherine Lake, Onslow County, North Carolina. The district encompasses eight contributing buildings in the mid- to late-19th century community of Catherine Lake. The district developed between about 1850 and 1900 and includes notable examples of Greek Revival and Italianate style architecture. Notable contributing buildings include the John A. Avirett house (c. 1850), the Jay Franklin Boggs House (c. 1873), and the Rodolph Duffy house (1896).

It was listed on the National Register of Historic Places in 1989.
