= Richlands Historic District (Richlands, North Carolina) =

Historic district in North Carolina, United States

- U.S. National Register of Historic Places
- U.S. Historic district
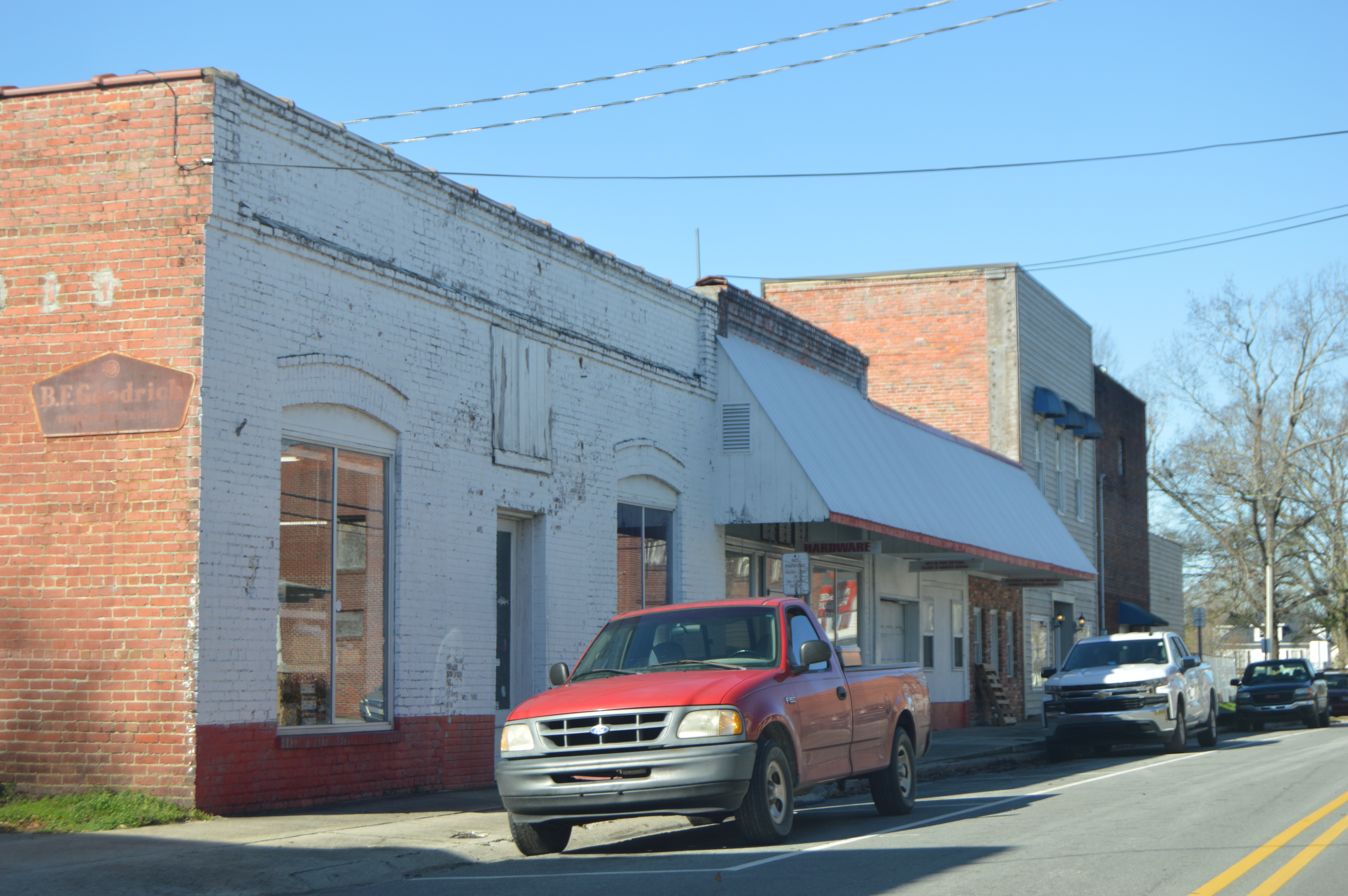
- Commercial district on Hargett Street

- Location within North Carolina Location within the United States
- Location: Roughly bounded by Foy, Trenton, Hargett, Wilmington, Franck, and Church Sts., Richlands, North Carolina
- Coordinates: 34°54′00″N 77°32′49″W
- Area: 48 acres (19 ha)
- Built: c. 1880
- Architect: Benjamin Findeisen, Joseph Coston
- Architectural style: I-House, late Victorian millwork
- MPS: Onslow County MPS
- NRHP reference No.: 90000441
- Added to NRHP: March 16, 1990

Richlands Historic District is a national historic district located at Richlands, Onslow County, North Carolina. The district encompasses 90 contributing buildings, 2 contributing structures, and 2 contributing objects in the central business district and surrounding residential sections of Richlands. The district largely developed after 1880 and includes notable examples of Late Victorian and I-house style residential architecture. Notable contributing buildings include the Robert D. Thompson House (1908), Daniel Webster Murrill House (1908), the Del Barbee House (1910), the Edwards-Cox House (1915), Isaac Koonce House (1918), George Brooks House (1915), Franck House (1914), Richlands Theater (1936), J. F. Mohn Building (1936), Richlands Supply Company Building (1905), M. B. Steed Store (1911), Peoples Bank Building (c. 1904), Bank of Richlands (1927), First Baptist Church (1920s), and Richlands United Methodist Church (1939).

It was listed on the National Register of Historic Places in 1990.
