= Swansboro, North Carolina =

Swansboro
- Town
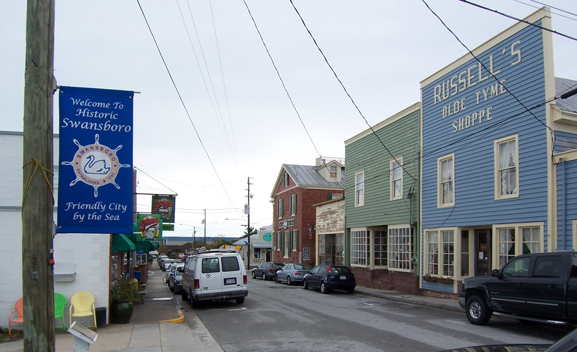
- Downtown Swansboro

- Flag Seal
- Motto: "The Friendly City by the Sea"
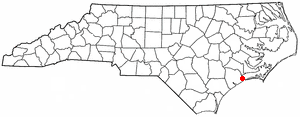
- Location within the state of North Carolina

- Location in the United States
- Coordinates: 34°41′48″N 77°07′13″W
- Country: United States
- State: North Carolina
- County: Onslow

Government
  - Mayor: William Justice

Area
  - Total: 2.38 sq mi (6.16 km^{2})
  - Land: 2.24 sq mi (5.79 km^{2})
  - Water: 0.14 sq mi (0.37 km^{2})
- Elevation: 30 ft (9.1 m)

Population (2020)
  - Total: 3,744
  - Density: 1,675/sq mi (646.9/km^{2})
- Time zone: UTC-5 (Eastern (EST))
  - Summer (DST): UTC-4 (EDT)
- ZIP code: 28584
- Area codes: 910, 472
- FIPS code: 37-66360
- GNIS feature ID: 2406700
- Website: swansboro-nc.org

Swansboro is a resort town in Onslow County, North Carolina, United States. It is located along the Crystal Coast. The population was 3,744 at the 2020 census.

== History ==
Swansboro started as a settlement around the plantation of Theophilus Weeks. In 1783, Swansboro was incorporated as a town, taking its name from Samuel Swann, a Speaker in the North Carolina House of Commons and a resident of Onslow County. In 1818, Otway Burns built the Prometheus, the first river steamboat constructed in North Carolina.

The town, originally spelled Swannsborough, is sometimes called "The Friendly City by the Sea". M.N. Lisk, a popular Swansboro mayor, initiated the annual Mullet Festival, one of the first coastal seafood festivals in North Carolina.

The town is featured as the setting of Nicholas Sparks' novel The Guardian.

The Swansboro Historic District was listed on the National Register of Historic Places in 1990.

In 2018, Swansboro was among the hardest hit cities by Hurricane Florence. A record 30.58 inches (77 cm) of rain fell at Swansboro, North Carolina, breaking the previous state record of 24.06 inches (61 cm).

== Geography ==
According to the United States Census Bureau, the town has a total area of 1.3 square miles (3.4 km^{2}), of which 1.2 square miles (3.1 km^{2}) is land and 0.1 square miles (0.26 km^{2}) (8.96%) is water.

== Town government ==
The Town of Swansboro is governed by the mayor and five commissioners (who form the Board of Commissioners). The commissioners are elected for four-year and two-year terms. The Mayor is elected for a four-year term. They are elected as Town-wide representatives. The mayor presides at all meetings as the chairman of the Board of Commissioners, and votes only to break a tie. The mayor pro tem is appointed by the commissioners and presides over meetings in the absence of the mayor.

== Demographics ==
Historical population
| Census | Pop. | Note | %± |
|---|---|---|---|
| 1850 | 801 | | — |
| 1870 | 141 | | — |
| 1880 | 128 | | −9.2% |
| 1890 | 233 | | 82.0% |
| 1900 | 265 | | 13.7% |
| 1910 | 390 | | 47.2% |
| 1920 | 420 | | 7.7% |
| 1930 | 394 | | −6.2% |
| 1940 | 454 | | 15.2% |
| 1950 | 559 | | 23.1% |
| 1960 | 1,104 | | 97.5% |
| 1970 | 1,207 | | 9.3% |
| 1980 | 976 | | −19.1% |
| 1990 | 1,165 | | 19.4% |
| 2000 | 1,426 | | 22.4% |
| 2010 | 2,663 | | 86.7% |
| 2020 | 3,744 | | 40.6% |
U.S. Decennial Census

=== 2020 census ===
Swansboro racial composition
| Race | Number | Percentage |
|---|---|---|
| White (non-Hispanic) | 3,091 | 82.56% |
| Black or African American (non-Hispanic) | 121 | 3.23% |
| Native American | 14 | 0.37% |
| Asian | 77 | 2.06% |
| Pacific Islander | 4 | 0.11% |
| Other/Mixed | 201 | 5.37% |
| Hispanic or Latino | 236 | 6.3% |

As of the 2020 census, there were 3,744 people, 1,360 households, and 755 families residing in the town. The median age was 40.2 years. 22.5% of residents were under the age of 18 and 19.3% of residents were 65 years of age or older. For every 100 females there were 85.8 males, and for every 100 females age 18 and over there were 82.6 males age 18 and over.

100.0% of residents lived in urban areas, while 0.0% lived in rural areas.

Of households in Swansboro, 31.5% had children under the age of 18 living in them. Of all households, 52.1% were married-couple households, 14.6% were households with a male householder and no spouse or partner present, and 28.9% were households with a female householder and no spouse or partner present. About 27.0% of all households were made up of individuals and 13.9% had someone living alone who was 65 years of age or older.

There were 1,821 housing units, of which 14.4% were vacant. The homeowner vacancy rate was 3.5% and the rental vacancy rate was 6.0%.

=== 2000 census ===
As of the census of 2000, there were 1,426 people, 655 households, and 419 families residing in the town. The population density was 1,168.2 inhabitants per square mile (451.0/km^{2}). There were 770 housing units at an average density of 630.8 per square mile (243.6/km^{2}). The racial makeup of the town was 90.18% White, 4.63% African American, 0.21% Native American, 0.77% Asian, 0.91% from other races, and 3.30% from two or more races. Hispanic or Latino of any race were 2.81% of the population.

There were 655 households, out of which 28.9% had children under the age of 18 living with them, 44.6% were married couples living together, 15.0% had a female householder with no husband present, and 36.0% were non-families. 32.4% of all households were made up of individuals, and 13.1% had someone living alone who was 65 years of age or older. The average household size was 2.18 and the average family size was 2.72.

In the town, the population was spread out, with 24.4% under the age of 18, 7.6% from 18 to 24, 28.1% from 25 to 44, 23.1% from 45 to 64, and 16.8% who were 65 years of age or older. The median age was 38 years. For every 100 females, there were 83.5 males. For every 100 females age 18 and over, there were 81.2 males.

The median income for a household in the town was $37,740, and the median income for a family was $45,357. Males had a median income of $32,188 versus $25,556 for females. The per capita income for the town was $19,625. About 10.3% of families and 11.9% of the population were below the poverty line, including 18.9% of those under age 18 and 7.6% of those age 65 or over.

== Education ==
- Queens Creek Elementary School
- Swansboro Elementary School
- Sand Ridge Elementary (Swansboro Town Ship)
- Swansboro Middle School
- Swansboro High School

== Tourism ==
Swansboro sits across the Intracoastal Waterway from Hammocks Beach State Park and is a popular destination for tourists, outdoor enthusiasts and recreational fishermen.

The Rotary Club of Swansboro is active in the community and regularly hosts events such as the annual King Mackerel Tournament and numerous fundraising gatherings. The Mullet Festival is the most notable and longest running Annual festival of 68 years that features a parade, street vendors, and live music.

== Notable person ==
- Otway Burns, (c. 1775–1850), privateer and North Carolina State Senator, was born at Queen's Creek near Swansboro
