= Southwest Historic District (Waltons Store, North Carolina) =

Historic district in North Carolina, United States

- U.S. National Register of Historic Places
- U.S. Historic district
- Location within North Carolina Location within the United States
- Location: NC 53 and SR 1217, near Waltons Store, North Carolina
- Coordinates: 34°44′25″N 77°30′22″W
- Area: 55 acres (22 ha)
- Architectural style: Coastal plain cottage
- MPS: Onslow County MPS
- NRHP reference No.: 89001854
- Added to NRHP: November 13, 1989

Southwest Historic District, also known as Waltons Store Historic District, is a national historic district located near Waltons Store, Onslow County, North Carolina. The district encompasses 14 contributing buildings and 2 contributing sites surrounding the crossroads community of Waltons Store. The district includes the Southwest Primitive Baptist Church, Southwest School (c. 1913), two cemeteries, and three farmsteads associated with the Walton family.

It was listed on the National Register of Historic Places in 1989.
