= H. P. Ruffell Smith =

British Royal Air Force officer and physician (1911–1980)

Hugh Patrick Ruffell Smith
- Born: 19 June 1911
- Died: 4 August 1980 (aged 69); Thatcham, Berkshire
- Military career
- Allegiance: United Kingdom
- Branch: Royal Air Force
- Service years: 1938–1961
- Rank: Group Captain
- Conflicts: Second World War
- Awards: Air Force Cross & Two Bars

Group Captain Hugh Patrick Ruffell Smith, AFC & Two Bars (19 June 1911 – 4 August 1980) was a British physician, pilot, and Royal Air Force officer. He is best known for revolutionizing the study of human factors integration into aviation safety, particularly with his work in crew resource management, culminating in a landmark technical memorandum for NASA titled "A simulator study of the interaction of pilot workload with errors, vigilance, and decisions".

In the early 1970s, Ruffell Smith collaborated with researchers from the Royal Air Force and the British Overseas Airways Corporation (BOAC), which merged to form British Airways in 1974, on studies regarding flight crew stress and fatigue. In 1970, he co-authored a study utilising cardiac data to map the physiological workloads and psychological stress experienced by airline training captains during line operations and simulator flights. Following this, he teamed again with aviation researcher Valerie Marguerite Sutton-Mattocks, alongside BOAC medical director Dr Frank S. Preston, for a 14-week study tracking cumulative sleep loss in airline cabin crews operating long-haul Boeing 707 and Vickers VC10 jet airliners. Executed during an era when aerospace medicine and military aviation research were almost exclusively male-dominated fields, this investigation co-authored by Valerie Sutton-Mattocks proved that sleep deprivation degraded emergency readiness. By evaluating cabin staff as safety-critical operators rather than service personnel, their findings provided a baseline for modern international flight and duty time limitations (FTL), ensuring cabin crew rest was regulated alongside cockpit pilots.

His obituary in The Times stated: "few aircraft flying today do not carry some evidence of his research into instrument presentation or cockpit layout". He was awarded the Air Force Cross three times.
