= Richlands, North Carolina =

Richlands
- Town
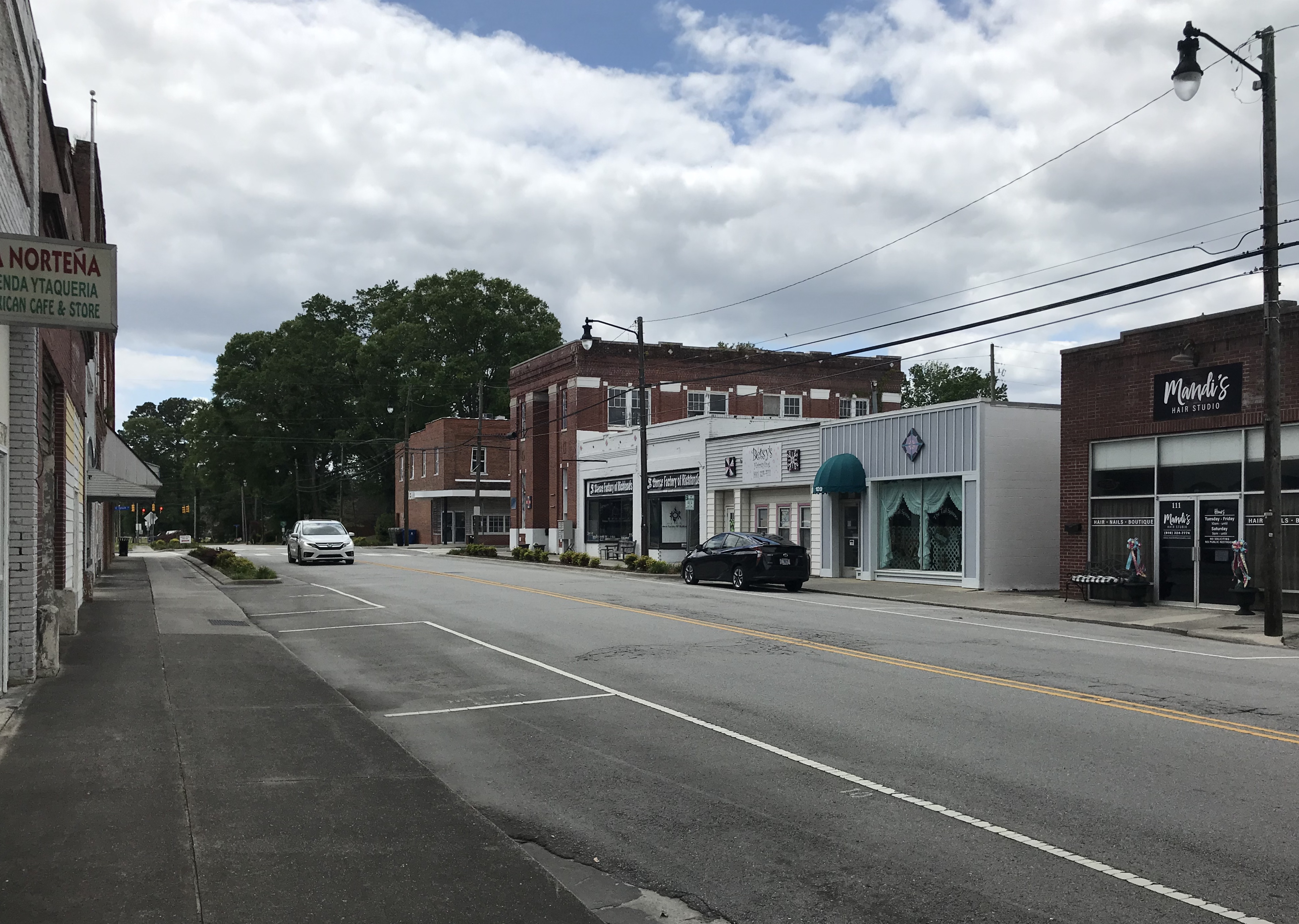
- North Wilmington Street

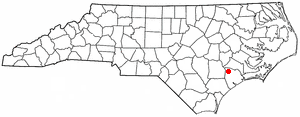
- Coordinates: 34°54′01″N 77°32′34″W
- Country: United States
- State: North Carolina
- County: Onslow

Area
  - Total: 1.65 sq mi (4.28 km^{2})
  - Land: 1.65 sq mi (4.28 km^{2})
  - Water: 0 sq mi (0.00 km^{2})
- Elevation: 52 ft (16 m)

Population (2020)
  - Total: 2,287
  - Density: 1,385/sq mi (534.8/km^{2})
- Time zone: UTC-5 (Eastern (EST))
  - Summer (DST): UTC-4 (EDT)
- ZIP code: 28574
- Area codes: 910, 472
- FIPS code: 37-56360
- GNIS feature ID: 2407208
- Website: https://www.richlandsnc.gov/

Richlands is a town in Onslow County, North Carolina, United States. As of the 2020 census, Richlands had a population of 2,287. It is included in the Jacksonville, North Carolina Metropolitan Statistical Area. Incorporated on March 29, 1880, it was the first town in Onslow County to have its own library and museum (home of the Onslow County Museum). Richlands was also the first town in Onslow County to have a female mayor, Annette Hargett.

Richlands is located 12 miles northwest of Jacksonville.

== History ==
A post office called Richlands has been in operation since 1806. The town was so named on account of its rich soil.

The Avirett-Stephens Plantation, Richlands Historic District, Taylor Farm, and Venters Farm Historic District are listed on the National Register of Historic Places.

== Geography ==
According to the United States Census Bureau, the town has a total area of 1.2 square miles (3.1 km^{2}), all land.

== Demographics ==
Historical population
Census	Pop.	Note	%±
1890	198		—
1900	160		−19.2%
1910	445		178.1%
1920	548		23.1%
1930	503		−8.2%
1940	688		36.8%
1950	877		27.5%
1960	1,079		23.0%
1970	935		−13.3%
1980	825		−11.8%
1990	996		20.7%
2000	928		−6.8%
2010	1,520		63.8%
2020	2,287		50.5%
U.S. Decennial Census

=== 2020 census ===
Richlands racial composition
Race	Number	Percentage
White (non-Hispanic)	1,430	62.53%
Black or African American (non-Hispanic)	384	16.79%
Native American	16	0.7%
Asian	31	1.36%
Pacific Islander	4	0.17%
Other/Mixed	191	8.35%
Hispanic or Latino	231	10.1%

As of the 2020 census, Richlands had a population of 2,287. There were 772 households and 525 families residing in the town. The median age was 30.5 years. 33.8% of residents were under the age of 18 and 11.5% of residents were 65 years of age or older. For every 100 females, there were 92.5 males, and for every 100 females age 18 and over there were 85.0 males age 18 and over.

0.0% of residents lived in urban areas, while 100.0% lived in rural areas.

Of households in Richlands, 50.4% had children under the age of 18 living in them. 51.3% were married-couple households, 15.0% were households with a male householder and no spouse or partner present, and 28.8% were households with a female householder and no spouse or partner present. About 22.2% of all households were made up of individuals and 10.0% had someone living alone who was 65 years of age or older.

There were 892 housing units, of which 11.1% were vacant. The homeowner vacancy rate was 4.7% and the rental vacancy rate was 5.9%.

=== 2000 census ===
As of the census of 2000, there were 928 people, 399 households, and 244 families residing in the town. The population density was 781.1 inhabitants per square mile (301.6/km^{2}). There were 424 housing units at an average density of 356.9 per square mile (137.8/km^{2}). The racial makeup of the town was 71.44% White, 25.11% African American, 0.43% Native American, 0.75% Asian, 0.75% from other races, and 1.51% from two or more races. Hispanic or Latino of any race were 2.16% of the population.

There were 399 households, out of which 27.8% had children under the age of 18 living with them, 40.4% were married couples living together, 16.8% had a female householder with no husband present, and 38.6% were non-families. 35.1% of all households were made up of individuals, and 20.6% had someone living alone who was 65 years of age or older. The average household size was 2.33 and the average family size was 3.03.

In the town, the population was spread out, with 23.3% under the age of 18, 8.1% from 18 to 24, 26.0% from 25 to 44, 23.9% from 45 to 64, and 18.8% who were 65 years of age or older. The median age was 41 years. For every 100 females, there were 78.1 males. For every 100 females age 18 and over, there were 73.2 males.

The median income for a household in the town was $20,263, and the median income for a family was $31,667. Males had a median income of $26,875 versus $20,000 for females. The per capita income for the town was $18,615. About 23.1% of families and 24.5% of the population were below the poverty line, including 30.8% of those under age 18 and 24.0% of those age 65 or over.

== Schools ==
- Heritage Elementary School
- Richlands Elementary School
- Trexler Middle School
- Richlands High School
- Liberty Christian Academy

== Farmer's Day ==
Farmer's Day was an annual celebration of Richland's agrarian roots. Traditionally held on the first Saturday after Labor Day each year, the festival began in 1966 and ran for 50 years before ending in 2016. The celebration began in the morning with a parade through town and continued on the grounds of Richlands Primary School (now Heritage Elementary School). The day includes live music, local vendors, games, and food.

== Notable people ==
- Jeremy Hall – Army soldier, filed lawsuit against the DoD for religious discrimination
- Tyler Matthews – NASCAR driver
- Charlie Sanders – Pro Football Hall of Fame Inductee; 1970s NFL All-Decade Team
- John Williams Shackelford – 19th-century U.S. Congressman
- Mario Williams – Number one overall pick in the 2006 NFL draft by the Houston Texans
