= List of ship decommissionings in 1901 =

The list of ship decommissionings in 1901 includes a chronological list of ships decommissioned in 1901. In cases where no official decommissioning ceremony was held, the date of withdrawal from service may be used instead. For ships lost at sea, see list of shipwrecks in 1901 instead.

Date	Operator	Ship	Class and type	Fate and other notes
Unknown date	Spanish Navy	Almansa	Floating jetty	Ex-screw frigate; hulked since 1894; decommissioned and sold for scrap in either 1899, 1900, or 1901 (according to different sources)
