= List of ship decommissionings in 1900 =

The list of ship decommissionings in 1900 includes a chronological list of ships decommissioned in 1900. In cases where no official decommissioning ceremony was held, the date of withdrawal from service may be used instead. For ships lost at sea, see list of shipwrecks in 1900 instead.

Date	Operator	Ship	Class and type	Fate and other notes
18 May	Spanish Navy	Isabel II	Velasco-class unprotected cruiser	hulked; stricken in 1907 or 1935
Unknown date	Spanish Navy	Almansa	Floating jetty	Ex-screw frigate; hulked since 1894; decommissioned and sold for scrap in either 1899, 1900, or 1901 (according to different sources)
