= List of mayors of Jacksonville, North Carolina =

The following is a list of mayors of the city of Jacksonville, North Carolina, USA. Jacksonville is in Onslow County.

== Mayors ==
- J.W. Burton, ca. 1896
- F. W. Hargett, ca. 1902–1907
- H.C. Canaday, ca. 1910–1911
- A.G. Walton, ca. 1913
- R.P. Hinton, ca. 1916
- John T. Alsop, ca. 1925
- Herbt M. Eastwood, ca. 1948
- Julian W. Bender, ca. 1957
- A. Joyner Lewis, ca. 1960
- W. Robt Page Jr., ca. 1963
- B. Teachy, ca. 1972
- M.C. "Joe" Choate, ca. 1994–1997
- Jan Bean Slagle, 2006–2010
- Sammy Phillips, ca. 2011–2024

== See also ==
- Jacksonville history
