= List of ship decommissionings in 1899 =

The list of ship decommissionings in 1899 is a chronological list of ships decommissioned in 1899. In cases where no official decommissioning ceremony was held, the date of withdrawal from service may be used instead. For ships lost at sea, see list of shipwrecks in 1899 instead.

Date	Operator	Ship	Pennant	Class and type	Fate and other notes	Ref
January	Spanish Navy	Gerona	–	Floating jetty/depot ship	Ex-screw frigate; hulked since 1895; sold for scrap 1901	
Unknown date	Spanish Navy	Almansa	–	Floating jetty	Ex-screw frigate; hulked since 1894; decommissioned and sold for scrap in either 1899, 1900, or 1901 (according to different sources)	
Unknown date	United States Navy	USS Sangamon	–	Passaic-class monitor	Sold for scrap in 1905	
