= Jacksonville Speedway =

Racetrack

- Location: Piney Green, North Carolina, United States
- Coordinates: 34°45′49″N 77°19′58″W
- Opened: 1957
- Closed: 1964

Jacksonville Speedway was a dirt track located in Piney Green, North Carolina just southeast of Jacksonville, North Carolina. The speedway was a half-mile dirt track that hosted two NASCAR Grand National Series races in 1957 and 1964.

== Racing history ==
A field of nineteen started the inaugural race on June 30, 1957. The 27th race of the Grand National season, Lee Petty won the pole position with a speed of 61.328 miles per hour (98.698 km/h). Tiny Lund would start second on the grid. On the twelfth lap of the 200 lap event, Johnny Allen would retire Spook Crawfords '57 Plymouth first with an engine failure. Bobby Keck would be next in lap 14 with a broken piston. On lap 30 Peck Peckham retired with a blown engine. L.D. Austin completed 58 laps and retired with electrical issues. Billy Myers lasted 81 circuits until his a-frame broke. Speedy Thompson, a few weeks away from his Southern 500 win, lasted 101 laps before the car began to over heat. Darel Dieringer came next on lap 121 followed by T.A. Toomes on lap 151 and Huck Spaulding on lap 168. Buck Baker would win the race by three laps over Jim Paschal and take home $1,000 for first place for close to two hours of racing in front of 3,600 spectators.

The final race would be the last race of the 1964 season. Richard Petty entered the race with a 5,000 point advantage over Ned Jarrett. Petty would start fourth on the grid, while Jarrett started second. Doug Yates won the pole position out of 25 cars, the last of his career. Doug Yates led the first nine laps before losing it to Jarrett. On lap 15, the short career of Bubba Into which began a week earlier came to an end with a blown engine in his antique '62 Dodge bringing out the first caution. By lap 38, Jarrett lost the lead to Petty. The second caution came on lap 59 when Roy Tyner lost his engine joining Baker, his son Buddy Baker, Earl Brooks and Into. David Pearson on the 65th lap. The third caution was given on lap 80 when the '63 Ford piloted by Possum Jones began to leak oil onto the speedway. On lap 104, Jarrett took command of the race for the final time. The last caution came out on lap 150 when Larry Manning trashed his '62 Chevrolet. Jarrett won the race by one lap over Petty, his 15th win of the year but Richard Petty would win his first championship. This would be the last short track race in the Jacksonville area until Coastal Plains Raceway opened in 2000.

All information provided is from Perry Allen Wood's book, Silent Speedways of the Carolinas.
