= List of shipwrecks in 1901 =

The list of shipwrecks in 1901 includes ships sunk, foundered, grounded, or otherwise lost during 1901.

table of contents
1901
Jan	Feb	Mar	Apr
May	Jun	Jul	Aug
Sep	Oct	Nov	Dec
Unknown date

== January ==
=== 3 January ===
List of shipwrecks: 3 January 1901
Ship	State	Description
Doretta	United States	The steamer ran aground and sank in Ramshorn Creek in South Carolina. Later raised.

=== 4 January ===
List of shipwrecks: 4 January 1901
Ship	State	Description
Madras	United Kingdom	The trawler was sunk in collisions with trawlers "Tarantula" and "Molopo", both (United Kingdom) in the Humber Estuary.

=== 7 January ===
List of shipwrecks: 7 January 1901
Ship	State	Description
Tenzer	United Kingdom	The ketch foundered off Padstow harbour after striking a rock. The crew landed in the ship's boat.

=== 8 January ===
List of shipwrecks: 8 January 1901
Ship	State	Description
Sunrise	United States	The steamer struck an obstruction in the Red River and sank off Caspiana Plantation, Louisiana. Later raised.

=== 10 January ===
List of shipwrecks: 10 January 1901
Ship	State	Description
E. A. Hawes	United States	The steamer sank at dock reportedly by being caught under the dock on a rising tide at Wilmington, North Carolina.
Osceola	United States	The steamer struck an obstruction in Grand Lake, Louisiana and sank off Pigeon Point, a total loss.
Wenatchee	United States	The 77 GRT sternwheel paddle steamer burned at Wenatchee, Washington. All five people on board survived.

=== 11 January ===
List of shipwrecks: 11 January 1901
Ship	State	Description
Unknown	United States	A scow, under tow of Dewitt C. Ivins (United States), sank off Sandy Hook, New Jersey. One crewman was killed.

=== 14 January ===
List of shipwrecks: 14 January 1901
Ship	State	Description
Vigilancia	United States	The steamer stranded on the Colorado Reef off the coast of Cuba, west of Havana, Cuba. She was refloated on 2 June 1901 and taken to New York city and declared a total loss. However, the vessel was repaired by 20 May 1902.

=== 16 January ===
List of shipwrecks: 16 January 1901
Ship	State	Description
HMS Sybille	Royal Navy	The Apollo-class protected cruiser was wrecked at Lambert's Bay, South Africa.

=== 17 January ===
List of shipwrecks: 17 January 1901
Ship	State	Description
Beulah Benton	United States	The schooner was sunk in a collision with Pilot Boy (United States) near Rantowles Creek, South Carolina.

=== 18 January ===
List of shipwrecks: 18 January 1901
Ship	State	Description
Kaisari	United Kingdom	The London steamer was wrecked on the coast of Réunion during a cyclone. Nineteen Lascars drowned along with four British officers and the captain.

=== 19 January ===
List of shipwrecks: 19 January 1901
Ship	State	Description
City of Louisville	United States	The laid up steamer burned at Benton Harbor, Michigan, apparently a total loss. Her watchman was killed.
Edna	United States	The tug was wrecked on the east side of Chesapeake Bay after a line fouled her propeller.
Marie Celine	France	The schooner sank near Falmouth, Cornwall.
Moen Tryvan	United Kingdom	The sailing ship capsized and sank in the English Channel in a gale from shifting ballast. Ten crew died and eight were rescued by a French fishing boat.

=== 20 January ===
List of shipwrecks: 20 January 1901
Ship	State	Description
Eli Shriver Jr.	United States	The steamer sank at dock in Bayonne, New Jersey. Later raised and repaired.

=== 26 January ===
List of shipwrecks: 26 January 1901
Ship	State	Description
Unnamed	Spain	The fishing fleet lost one boat and twenty-three lives during a storm.

=== 28 January ===
List of shipwrecks: 28 January 1901
Ship	State	Description
Buckeye State	United States	The steamer burned in the Mississippi River off Barfield Point, Arkansas, a total loss. One crewman killed.
Gardenia	United States	The steamer was blown ashore by high winds and sunk in Capers Creek, South Carolina.
Holland	United Kingdom	The London steamer bound for Rotterdam sank near the Hook of Holland during a storm. Four passengers and eleven crew drowned.
Lanarkshire	United Kingdom	The barque was abandoned in the North Sea 6 nautical miles (11 km) north west of the Noord Hinder Lightship (Netherlands). She subsequently foundered.

=== 29 January ===
List of shipwrecks: 29 January 1901
Ship	State	Description
Vincennes	United States	The steamer struck an obstruction and sank in the Wabash River at Vincennes, Indiana. Raised and repaired.

=== Unknown date (January) ===
List of shipwrecks: Unknown January 1901
Ship	State	Description
Hannah	United Kingdom	The schooner was abandoned in the Irish Sea. She came ashore on 28 January at Mwnt, Cardiganshire and was wrecked.
Maxim	United States	The 117 GRT schooner departed San Francisco, California, bound for Eureka, California, with six people aboard and was never heard from again.

== February ==
=== 3 February ===
List of shipwrecks: 3 February 1901
Ship	State	Description
Daisy	United States	The steamship was towing barges loaded with stone on the Warrior River, Alabama when she became unmanageable due to wind and tide and went over the dam at Lock #6. The loaded barges then fell upon her, resulting in a complete wreck. One crewman killed.

=== 4 February ===
List of shipwrecks: 4 February 1901
Ship	State	Description
Goonglaze	United Kingdom	The St Agnes, Cornwall schooner foundered near Peppercombe Castle, in Bideford Bay. Four bodies were washed ashore near Westward Ho!, Devon.
Janie Vivian	United Kingdom	The Padstow, Cornwall schooner was driven ashore, near her home port, on the sands below Bray Hill in the Camel estuary. She was taking grain to Cardiff and all the crew survived.
McPherson	United States	The wrecked transport McPherson, looking from seaward. The United States Army transport ran aground on a reef about 8 miles (13 km) west of Matanzas. All crew and passengers rescued. Refloated later in the year and sold for scrap.

=== 5 February ===
List of shipwrecks: 5 February 1901
Ship	State	Description
Bob Connell	United States	The steamer struck a sunken Flat in the Monongahela River near Woods Run and sank.

=== 6 February ===
List of shipwrecks: 6 February 1901
Ship	State	Description
New York Central No. 11	United States	The tow steamer caught fire at her slip at Sixty-Fifth Street in the North River. She was towed to the Weehawken Flats and flooded to put out the fire.

=== 12 February ===
List of shipwrecks: 12 February 1901
Ship	State	Description
Scow No.38	United States	The scow was lost off Scotland Lightship. One crewman killed.

=== 15 February ===
List of shipwrecks: 15 February 1901
Ship	State	Description
Gem	United States	The steamer struck a snag in the Red River and sank. Later raised.

=== 16 February ===
List of shipwrecks: 16 February 1901
Ship	State	Description
Rosa B.	United States	The steamer was destroyed by fire while lying at Farmersville, Louisiana.

=== 19 February ===
List of shipwrecks: 19 February 1901
Ship	State	Description
Julien Marie	France	The brigantine ran aground at St. Ives, Cornwall, United Kingdom. The crew were rescued by lifeboat

=== 20 February ===
List of shipwrecks: 20 February 1901
Ship	State	Description
Curlew	United States	The tug was sunk in a collision with Robert S. Bradley (United States) in Boston Harbor.

=== 21 February ===
List of shipwrecks: 21 February 1901
Ship	State	Description
Alert	Australia	The tug foundered off Nambucca Heads.

=== 22 February ===
List of shipwrecks: 22 February 1901
Ship	State	Description
City of Rio de Janeiro	United States	The Pacific Mail Steamship Company-owned passenger ship struck rocks and sank off Fort Point, San Francisco in 320 feet (98 m) of water in dense fog near the entrance to San Francisco Bay. About 127–135 were lost, of whom 68 were passengers.
Surprise	United States	The steamer was blown ashore in a gale at Koloa, Kauai, Territory of Hawaii, a total loss.

=== 25 February ===
List of shipwrecks: 25 February 1901
Ship	State	Description
Iliamma	United States	The disabled 17-ton, 40-foot (12.2 m) schooner – adrift with one man aboard since 25 November 1900, when she slipped her moorings at Unga on Unga Island in the Shumagin Islands off the south coast of the Alaska Peninsula in the District of Alaska – was wrecked on the coast of Kagalaska Island in the Andreanof Islands subgroup of the Aleutian Islands during a gale. The man on board her survived.

=== Unknown date (February) ===
List of shipwrecks: unknown February 1901
Ship	State	Description
Commonwealth	United States	The schooner left Gloucester, Massachusetts on 22 January. Believed lost in a blizzard in the first week of February on the Georges Bank. Lost with all 17 crew.
County of Haddington	United Kingdom	The sailing ship departed New York City for Shanghai on 2 February and vanished. Lost with all 25 crew.

== March ==
=== 1 March ===
List of shipwrecks: 1 March 1901
Ship	State	Description
Indiana	United Kingdom	Following a collision, the abandoned Hull steamer went ashore in the English Channel at Worthing.

=== 3 March ===
List of shipwrecks: 3 March 1901
Ship	State	Description
Anna	United States	After dragging her anchors during a storm, the 227-ton, 117-foot (35.7 m) schooner was blown ashore and wrecked at Company Harbor (54°29′N 162°49′W) on the western end of Sanak Island in the Aleutian Islands. Her crew of eight survived.

=== 8 March ===
List of shipwrecks: 8 March 1901
Ship	State	Description
Aviona	United Kingdom	The Glasgow vessel sank at the entrance to Bilbao harbour. Twenty-three of the crew lost their lives.

=== 14 March ===
List of shipwrecks: 14 March 1901
Ship	State	Description
Voorspoed	Netherlands	The Amsterdam schooner ran aground at Perranporth, near Chapel Rock. The crew escaped via the breeches buoy. The vessel was carrying coal and machinery from Cardiff to Brazil.

=== 16 March ===
List of shipwrecks: 16 March 1901
Ship	State	Description
Willamette	United States	The steamer was wrecked in thick fog at Village Point Reef, British Columbia. She was abandoned on 20 March.

=== 17 March ===
List of shipwrecks: 17 March 1901
Ship	State	Description
Bee	Australia	The steamship was wrecked in Picnic Bay, Magnetic Island, Queensland, Australia.

=== 19 March ===
List of shipwrecks: 19 March 1901
Ship	State	Description
Transit	United States	The steamer struck rocks at the Falls of the Ohio, Lexington, Kentucky and sank. Raised and repaired.

=== 21 March ===
List of shipwrecks: 21 March 1901
Ship	State	Description
Rose	United Kingdom	The brigantine ran aground on the Res Sands, in the North Sea off the coast of Kent, and sank with the loss of four of her seven crew. Survivors were rescued by Eliza Harriet ( Royal National Lifeboat Institution).
Tay	United Kingdom	The steamer was run into by the steamer Chemnitz (Germany) and sank off Flushing, while anchored during a voyage to Antwerp from London. There were three survivors out of seventeen on board.

=== 22 March ===
List of shipwrecks: 22 March 1901
Ship	State	Description
Josie Siverly	United States	The steamer was pushed onto the bank at Vicksburg, Mississippi when Belle of the Bends (United States) tried to make a landing and swung in against her. She was then wrecked by a rising tide and high winds.

=== 26 March ===
List of shipwrecks: 26 March 1901
Ship	State	Description
M. D. Wayman	United States	The steamer struck an obstruction in the Allegheny River near Herrs Island Dam and sank in 18 feet (5 m) of water. Later raised.

=== 29 March ===
List of shipwrecks: 29 March 1901
Ship	State	Description
Annie M. Bauer	United States	The tow steamer sprang a leak and sank in New York Bay off Erie Basin, Brooklyn. Two crewmen killed. Survivors rescued by John L. Berwind (United States).
Edgewater	United States	The lighter was sunk in a collision with Elizabeth (United States) off Pier 13 in the North River.

== April ==
=== 1 April ===
List of shipwrecks: 1 April 1901
Ship	State	Description
Amelia	United States	The steamer struck the ferry cable, capsized, and sank in the Suwanee River at Dudleyville, Florida. One crewman killed.

=== 2 April ===
List of shipwrecks: 2 April 1901
Ship	State	Description
Upolu	United States	The steamer struck a submerged rock at Puoko, Territory of Hawaii, and was ordered abandoned by her owners the next day, a total loss.

=== 5 April ===
List of shipwrecks: 5 April 1901
Ship	State	Description
Eillen	United States	The steamer was capsized by a gale and sunk in the Mississippi River near Owens Bar.

=== 7 April ===
List of shipwrecks: 7 April 1901
Ship	State	Description
Ivernia	United States	The steam oyster boat sank at dock at American Oyster Company, Providence, Rhode Island. Raised shortly after.

=== 8 April ===
List of shipwrecks: 8 April 1901
Ship	State	Description
Glenerie	United States	The steamer was sunk in a collision with John McCausland (United States) near the mouth of Rondout Creek.

=== 10 April ===
List of shipwrecks: 10 April 1901
Ship	State	Description
USAT Rawlins	United States	The United States Army Transport sank at Brooklyn Army pier with deck awash from a volume of water pumped from six fire engines, two trucks and three fireboats responding to an engine room fire. Damage was estimated at $20,000 to refloat and $50,000 to repair. The vessel was raised, repaired and put into commercial service as Powhatan.

=== 13 April ===
List of shipwrecks: 13 April 1901
Ship	State	Description
Awashonks	United States	The laid up passenger steamer was destroyed by fire at Tiverton, Rhode Island, possibly by Arson.
Majestic	United States	The steamer struck an obstruction or wreck off Dan Baker and was beached off Delaware City where she sank. Pumped out the next day.
Palos	United States	The yacht was destroyed by fire at Detroit, Michigan.

=== 17 April ===
List of shipwrecks: 17 April 1901
Ship	State	Description
City of Charleston	United States	The steamer blown from her moorings in a severe windstorm at Bridgeport, Alabama and sunk.

=== 19 April ===
List of shipwrecks: 19 April 1901
Ship	State	Description
Will J. Cummins	United States	The steamer was blown in a severe windstorm onto shore at Beech Creek Island and sunk on an obstruction.

=== 20 April ===
List of shipwrecks: 20 April 1901
Ship	State	Description
Alcedo	United States	The steamer was sunk by a flat she was trying to land. Later raised.
Karagola	United Kingdom	The steamship burned in Akyab, Burma, and was scuttled to quench the fire. Her wreck was later raised, condemned, and scrapped.
Robert McKinley	United States	The steamer burned and sank in the Monongahela River near Fayette City, Pennsylvania.

=== 21 April ===
List of shipwrecks: 21 April 1901
Ship	State	Description
Seham	Ottoman Navy	The Nasir-class torpedo boat was sunk by a boiler explosion in the outer harbor of Beirut. 27 crewmen were killed.

=== 22 April ===
List of shipwrecks: 22 April 1901
Ship	State	Description
Colorado	United States	While under tow from Juneau, District of Alaska, to Tacoma, Washington, by the tug Pilot (United Kingdom) and carrying a cargo of 1,098 tons of sulphurite concentrate, the 983-ton barge was wrecked on a reef in Wrangell Narrows opposite Anchor Point (56°38′15″N 132°55′35″W) in Southeast Alaska. She became a total loss.

=== 23 April ===
List of shipwrecks: 23 April 1901
Ship	State	Description
Emma C. Knowles	United States	The schooner was damaged in a collision with Allianca (United States) off Barnegat Light. Crew taken off by Allianca. Still afloat the next morning, but in sinking condition with decks awash in bad weather.
Samuel Ricker	United States	The schooner was sunk in a collision in dense fog with Pilgrim (United States) six miles (9.7 km) west of Cornfield Lightship in Long Island Sound. Her master was reported missing.
Vulcan	United States	The steamer was holed by a log and sunk in the Willamette River off Swan Island, Oregon.

=== 24 April ===
List of shipwrecks: 24 April 1901
Ship	State	Description
Pilgrim	United States	The steamer burned and sank at Ballard, Washington.

== May ==
=== 7 May ===
List of shipwrecks: 7 May 1901
Ship	State	Description
Tantallon Castle	United Kingdom	The mail steamer was wrecked on Robben Island, approaching Cape Town, South Africa, from Southampton, United Kingdom in fog. All passengers and crew were rescued; the ship broke up in the following days.

=== 10 May ===
List of shipwrecks: 10 May 1901
Ship	State	Description
Bon Voyage	United States	The steamer caught fire between Ontonagon, Michigan and Hancock, Michigan. She was beached and burned to the waterline. four passengers killed. 33 survivors.
France	France	The barque was abandoned in the Atlantic Ocean (approximately 34°S 48°W). Her crew were later rescued by Hebe (Germany). France was on a voyage from North Shields, County Durham to Valparaíso, Chile. France was sighted on 13 May by Josefa (Spain). Presumed subsequently foundered.

=== 11 May ===
List of shipwrecks: 11 May 1901
Ship	State	Description
Climax	United States	The two-thirds complete steamer burned at Wilmington, North Carolina by a spreading warehouse fire.

=== 12 May ===
List of shipwrecks: 12 May 1901
Ship	State	Description
City of Paducah	United States	The steamer struck a submerged obstacle and sank in 20 feet (6 m) of water at Brunckhorsts Landing, Illinois, a total loss. Two passengers killed.

=== 14 May ===
List of shipwrecks: 14 May 1901
Ship	State	Description
Owensboro	United States	The steamer burned and sank at Calhoun, Kentucky. Two crewmen killed.

=== 18 May ===
List of shipwrecks: 18 May 1901
Ship	State	Description
R. K. Wells	United States	The steamer, laid up at Charleston, West Virginia sprung a leak and sank, then burned to the waters edge, then the lower section drifted away.

=== 21 May ===
List of shipwrecks: 21 May 1901
Ship	State	Description
Zenith	United States	The tug struck a rock, rolled over, and sank in 20 feet (6 m) of water at the Mesaba Ore Dock. Raised and repaired.

=== 24 May ===
List of shipwrecks: 24 May 1901
Ship	State	Description
City of Baltimore	United States	The steamer struck a reef, broke in two foundered in a gale near Au Sable Township, Iosco County, Michigan on Gull Island Reef in Lake Huron. Her engine and boiler salvaged in October/November 1901, rest of equipment salvaged in 1903. 13 crewmen were killed.
Dubuque	United States	The steamer struck an obstruction in the Mississippi River three miles (4.8 km) below Keithsburg, Illinois between Buoy #192 and Buoy #193 and sank in seven and a half feet (2.3 m) of water. Later raised and repaired.
Empire State	United States	The steamer sprung a leak and was beached near Brockville, Ontario, Canada.
Walston	United States	The barge was punctured by an obstruction as the tide dropped off Roach's Shipyard, Chester, Pennsylvania and she sank.

=== 25 May ===
List of shipwrecks: 25 May 1901
Ship	State	Description
Louise	United States	The steamer was sunk in the Black River near Poplar Bluff, Missouri by a falling tree.

=== 27 May ===
List of shipwrecks: 27 May 1901
Ship	State	Description
Dubuque	United States	The steamer struck a submerged stump and sank in 7 1/2 feet (2.3 m) of water in the Mississippi River 3 miles (4.8 km) below Keithsburg, Illinois between Lights 192 and 193. Raised, taken to Dubuque, Iowa, and repaired.

=== 29 May ===
List of shipwrecks: 29 May 1901
Ship	State	Description
Unknown coal boats	United States	Eight coal boats were sunk when their tow, Acorn (United States), struck a bridge pier in fog at Kenova, West Virginia.

== June ==
=== 1 June ===
List of shipwrecks: 1 June 1901
Ship	State	Description
George S. Ross	United States	The steamer was wrecked and abandoned after her boiler exploded at Bull Creek in the Allegheny River. Her Captain was killed.

=== 2 June ===
List of shipwrecks: 2 June 1901
Ship	State	Description
Mataafa	United States	The steamship ran aground on Knife Island Reef in Lake Superior. She was refloated, repaired, and returned to service.

=== 4 June ===
List of shipwrecks: 4 June 1901
Ship	State	Description
Ranald	United Kingdom	The steamship capsized and sank in the Atlantic Ocean off Atlantic City, New Jersey, where she had anchored the previous day after her cargo of asphalt melted in hot weather and flowed throughout her holds, causing her to take on a dangerous list. Her crew made it to shore safely.

=== 7 June ===
List of shipwrecks: 7 June 1901
Ship	State	Description
Balaena	United States	The whaler was wrecked on an uncharted reef in thick fog three miles (4.8 km) south south east of Cape Chitnak, St. Lawrence Island in the Bering Sea.

=== 8 June ===
List of shipwrecks: 8 June 1901
Ship	State	Description
John S. Heath	United States	The tug capsized and sank while under tow by Wm. S. Anderson (United States) in the Buttermilk Channel. A boilermaker on board making repairs to the boiler was killed. Survivors were rescued by a passing steamer.

=== 11 June ===
List of shipwrecks: 11 June 1901
Ship	State	Description
J. P. Gage	United States	The steamer struck a log and sank in the Arkansas River between Dardanelle, Arkansas and St. Charles, Missouri.

=== 12 June ===
List of shipwrecks: 12 June 1901
Ship	State	Description
Harry Waltz	United States	The steamer struck a snag and sank in the Arkansas River between Dardanelle, Arkansas and Lockharts Landing, Arkansas. Raised and repaired.

=== 14 June ===
List of shipwrecks: 14 June 1901
Ship	State	Description
Northfield	United States	The ferry was damaged in a collision with Mauch Chunk (United States) off The Battery, sinking off the end of Pier 9 in the East River. Five passengers were killed. Survivors were rescued by tugboats.

=== 17 June ===
List of shipwrecks: 17 June 1901
Ship	State	Description
John B. Robinson	United States	The steamer struck the bar at D'Arbonne Island in the Ouachita River and sank. Later raised.

=== 18 June ===
List of shipwrecks: 18 June 1901
Ship	State	Description
Julia R.	United States	The steamer was destroyed by fire at Six Mile Lake near Morgan City, Louisiana.

=== 23 June ===
List of shipwrecks: 23 June 1901
Ship	State	Description
Unknown barge	United States	A coal elevator barge, under tow by Erie (United States), capsized in a sudden squall between Elizabethport, New Jersey and Bayonne, New Jersey. One person drowned.

=== 26 June ===
List of shipwrecks: 26 June 1901
Ship	State	Description
Lusitania	United Kingdom	The ship was built by Laird Brothers in Birkenhead in 1871. Her original owners were the Pacific Steam Navigation Company. She was sold to Elder Dempster Line in 1900 and plied the Liverpool to Canada run. En route to Canada on 26 June 1901 she was lost in fog near the Newfoundland coast. Off course, the ship ended up on the rocks. Some of the crew threatened the passengers and a day later passengers began to panic. The crew then restored order. All occupants of the vessel survived.

=== 28 June ===
List of shipwrecks: 28 June 1901
Ship	State	Description
Sir Luke	United States	The steamer was wrecked in a Gale between Portage Bay and Vans Harbor, Michigan. Her boiler and machinery was salvaged.

=== 29 June ===
List of shipwrecks: 29 June 1901
Ship	State	Description
Mohawk	United States	The passenger steamer struck a reef and sank in the Huckleberry Channel, sinking in 13 feet (4 m) of water. Raised and returned to service.

=== 30 June ===
List of shipwrecks: 30 June 1901
Ship	State	Description
Fern	United States	The wrecking steamer sank while salvaging iron from wrecks on Eagle River Reef in Lake Superior. Lost with all five crew.

=== Unknown date (June) ===
List of shipwrecks: unknown June 1901
Ship	State	Description
Omar D. Conger	United States	The steamer burned and sank at dock in the Black River, Port Huron, Michigan on 23 or 27 June. Raised and rebuilt at Port Huron, Michigan.

== July ==
=== 4 July ===
List of shipwrecks: 4 July 1901
Ship	State	Description
Alert	United States	The fishing steamer was punctured by an obstruction off Barnegat, New Jersey, she was then wrecked on near by shoals.

=== 5 July ===
List of shipwrecks: 5 July 1901
Ship	State	Description
Orlando	United States	The steamer struck an obstruction and sank in the White River 2 miles (3.2 km) above Peach Orchard Bluff, a total loss.

=== 6 July ===
List of shipwrecks: 6 July 1901
Ship	State	Description
Old Dominion	United States	The passenger steamer ran aground at Rye Neck, New York in thick fog. Refloated and taken to New York City on 10 August.
Venice	United States	The steamer struck an obstruction and sank in the Monongahela River near Fayette City, Pennsylvania. The vessel was abandoned.

=== 12 July ===
List of shipwrecks: 12 July 1901
Ship	State	Description
Lizzie Reid	United States	The steamer burned at Gettysburg, South Dakota and sank in eight feet (2.4 m) of water, a total loss.
Walter Thomas	United Kingdom	The 2,213 GRT steamship sank after a collision with Romney off Europa Point, Straits of Gibraltar on a voyage from Penarth to Derindje

=== 13 July ===
List of shipwrecks: 13 July 1901
Ship	State	Description
Charles D. Lane	United States	While towing the schooner Vega (United States), the 1,608-net register ton, 325.5-foot (99.2 m) fishing vessel was stranded in thick fog at Cape Mohican (60°12′N 167°25′W) on the northwest end of Nunivak Island in the Bering Sea. By the evening of 16 July, she had filled with sand and water, a total loss. Vega rescued all 53 people aboard Charles D. Lane.

=== 15 July ===
List of shipwrecks: 15 July 1901
Ship	State	Description
Blanche	United Kingdom	The 234 GRT steamship was wrecked on Île-Tudy on voyage Cardiff, Wales, to Quimper, France.
Oakland	United States	With a crew of 12 and a cargo of 900 tons of lumber and shingles aboard, the 534 GRT 150.8-foot (46.0 m) bark was wrecked without loss of life on a reef 10 nautical miles (19 km; 12 mi) from the entrance to the harbor at Port Clarence, District of Alaska.

=== 16 July ===
List of shipwrecks: 16 July 1901
Ship	State	Description
Tremont	United States	The steamer was damaged in a collision with the yacht Wild Duck (United States) two miles (3.2 km) west of Plum Island in Long Island Sound. She was towed to New London, Connecticut where she sank.

=== 18 July ===
List of shipwrecks: 18 July 1901
Ship	State	Description
Grampus	United States	The 326-ton steam whaling bark was beached on the coast of the District of Alaska near Point Barrow after suffering ice damage. She was condemned.

=== 20 July ===
List of shipwrecks: 20 July 1901
Ship	State	Description
City of Metropolis	United States	The laid up steamer, in custody of the United States Marshals Service, burned to the waterline in Quincy Bay, Illinois, a total loss.
Peter Hontz	United States	The steamer struck an obstruction and sank near Rumsey, Kentucky in the Green River. Raised and repaired.

=== 24 July ===
List of shipwrecks: 24 July 1901
Ship	State	Description
Stella	United States	The steamer was destroyed by fire at Columbia, Louisiana on the Ouachita River.

=== 25 July ===
List of shipwrecks: 25 July 1901
Ship	State	Description
Edna	United States	The steamer struck a snag near Lockport, Louisiana and sank in Bayou Lafourche.
Monhegan	United States	The sailing Yacht was wrecked on Assatigue Beach, a total loss.

=== 26 July ===
List of shipwrecks: 26 July 1901
Ship	State	Description
Empire	New South Wales	The barque caught fire in a gale while anchored in the Harbor of Mahukona, Territory of Hawaii, her anchor line parted and she drifted westward out to sea. She was abandoned by her crew after they were unable to extinguish the fire and she blew out to sea blazing, a total loss.
Jos Goldsmith	United States	The tug sank in a storm in Maumee Bay.

=== 29 July ===
List of shipwrecks: 29 July 1901
Ship	State	Description
Sagamore	United States	The whaleback barge was rammed by the steamship Northern Queen (flag unknown) while at anchor in fog in Whitefish Bay, Lake Superior, off the coast of Michigan and sank with the loss of three lives. Her five survivors were rescued by Northern Queen.

== August ==
=== 3 August ===
List of shipwrecks: 3 August 1901
Ship	State	Description
HMS Viper	Royal Navy	The Viper-class torpedo boat destroyer foundered on rocks at Alderney in the Channel Islands during naval manoeuvers. All aboard survived.

=== 4 August ===
List of shipwrecks: 4 August 1901
Ship	State	Description
Ada Barrett	United States	The steamer sank at dock in Duluth, Minnesota due to an open seacock.
Ford City	United States	The steamer struck an obstruction and sank in the Ohio River near Legionville, Pennsylvania. Later raised.

=== 6 August ===
List of shipwrecks: 6 August 1901
Ship	State	Description
Frank Pigeon Jr.	United States	The tug sank at dock at Pusey & Jones' Wharf, Wilmington, Delaware. Pumped out the next day.

=== 7 August ===
List of shipwrecks: 7 August 1901
Ship	State	Description
James Sennett	United States	During a voyage in ballast from Nome and St. Michael, District of Alaska, to Port Townsend, Washington with a crew of 12 aboard, the 693 GRT, 194.5-foot (59.3 m) four-masted schooner was wrecked without loss of life in Unimak Pass just south of Sennett Point (54°29′00″N 164°54′30″W) and 2 nautical miles (3.7 km; 2.3 mi) north of Scotch Cap on the coast of Unimak Island in the Aleutian Islands.

=== 8 August ===
List of shipwrecks: 8 August 1901
Ship	State	Description
Dewing & Sons	United States	The steamer sank near Lock #7 in the Monongahela River due to a supply pipe rusting through. Later raised.

=== 12 August ===
List of shipwrecks: 12 August 1901
Ship	State	Description
Laura May	United States	While under tow by the steamship Fram (United States) and carrying a crew of 23 and a cargo of 90 tons of salted salmon in 800 barrels, the 234 GRT, 121.6-foot (37.1 m) three-masted schooner was wrecked without loss of life in the Kvichak River near the Bristol Bay coast of the District of Alaska.

=== 14 August ===
List of shipwrecks: 14 August 1901
Ship	State	Description
Biloxi	United States	1901 Louisiana hurricane: The tug foundered in the storm near the Quarantine Station, Louisiana in the Mississippi River. Two crewmen killed.
Maunsell White	United States	1901 Louisiana hurricane: The laid up steamer was wrecked during the storm at Quarantine Station, Louisiana in the Mississippi River.

=== 15 August ===
List of shipwrecks: 15 August 1901
Ship	State	Description
Evelyn	United Kingdom	1901 Louisiana hurricane: The steamer went ashore 15 miles (24 km) west of the Santa Rosa Island, Florida Life Saving station during the storm. Later refloated.
Islander	United Kingdom	With 109 passengers and 62 crew members aboard, the Canadian Pacific Steam Navigation Company-owned twin-screw 240-foot (73.2 m) passenger-cargo steamship struck an iceberg and sank in 365 feet (111 m) of water off Douglas Island at the foot of Lynn Canal near Juneau, District of Alaska, United States. Newspapers reported that up to 70 people lost their lives, while official reports place the death toll at 45. She was refloated in 1934 and towed into shallow water.
Neptune	United States	1901 Louisiana hurricane: The steamer foundered at dock in the storm at Milneburg, Louisiana in Lake Pontchartrain. Later raised.
Tortugas	United States	1901 Louisiana hurricane: The lumber schooner was sunk in a collision at Pensacola, Florida while seeking refuge during the storm.

=== 18 August ===
List of shipwrecks: 18 August 1901
Ship	State	Description
Vermont	United States	The steamer burned at West Seattle, Washington.

=== 19 August ===
List of shipwrecks: 19 August 1901
Ship	State	Description
City of Golconda	United States	The steamer capsized in a severe windstorm near the Cottonwood Bar in the Ohio River between Elizabethtown, Illinois and Paducah, Kentucky. 11 passengers and 4 crewmen killed.

=== 21 August ===
List of shipwrecks: 21 August 1901
Ship	State	Description
George Stauber	United States	The steamer was sunk in a collision with Alexander McDougall (United States) in the St. Clair River off Ft. Gratiot.

=== 23 August ===
List of shipwrecks: 23 August 1901
Ship	State	Description
Rambler	United States	The tug caught fire at Diamond Street Wharf, Wilmington, Delaware and was sunk by the fire department's efforts to fight the fire.

=== 24 August ===
List of shipwrecks: 24 August 1901
Ship	State	Description
Dauntless	United States	The steamer was damaged in a collision with Mary Garratt (United States) near Kentucky Landing on the San Joaquin River and was beached to prevent sinking.

=== 25 August ===
List of shipwrecks: 25 August 1901
Ship	State	Description
Noranmore	Belgium	The W Johnston & Co.-owned cargo ship capsized and sank off Athens, Greece.

=== 26 August ===
List of shipwrecks: 26 August 1901
Ship	State	Description
Oakland	New South Wales	The passenger-cargo ship ran aground at the mouth of the Richmond River in New South Wales, Australia. Although declared a total loss, she was refloated, repaired, and returned to service.

=== 27 August ===
List of shipwrecks: 27 August 1901
Ship	State	Description
George Law	United States	The 414 GRT sidewheel paddle steamer burned at Camden, New Jersey. All nine people on board survived.
Ida E. Comly	United States	The sailing vessel sank after colliding with the steamship Endeavor (United States) in the Chesapeake Bay.

=== 28 August ===
List of shipwrecks: 28 August 1901
Ship	State	Description
City of Trenton	United States	The steamers' port boiler exploded and she caught fire in the Delaware River off Torresdale, Pennsylvania burning all woodwork, and was beached on the Pennsylvania side of the river. 24 killed.

=== 30 August ===
List of shipwrecks: 30 August 1901
Ship	State	Description
Eliza H. Strong	United States	The steamer sprang a leak and became waterlogged on Lake Superior. She was towed to Munising, Michigan and beached. Her crew was rescued by Courageous (United States). Refloated and taken to Buffalo, New York for repairs.
M. Sicken	United States	The steamer was sunk at dock when Curry (United States) swung wide and her stern hit M. Sicken in the Blackwell Canal, Buffalo, New York.
Mary E. Justice	United States	The steamer sprang a leak in the Delaware River off Brambles Point and sank in 11 feet (3 m) of water.

=== Unknown date (August) ===
List of shipwrecks: Unknown August 1901
Ship	State	Description
City of Clifton	United States	The steamer sank at 76 Landing a short distance above Grand Tower, Illinois sometime in August. Raised, repaired and returned to service.
Neptune	Russia	1901 Louisiana hurricane: The barque sailed from Pensacola, Florida for Montevideo on 10 August and was probably sunk by the hurricane in the Gulf of Mexico on 12 August, never seen again.
Unknown schooners	United States	1901 Louisiana hurricane: Four fishing schooners were sunk at Pensacola, Florida.

== September ==
=== 3 September ===
List of shipwrecks: 3 September 1901
Ship	State	Description
Brigantine	United States	The steamer sank in 12 feet (4 m) of water at a wharf in Atlantic City, New Jersey.

=== 4 September ===
List of shipwrecks: 4 September 1901
Ship	State	Description
Gold Dust	United States	The steamer was destroyed by fire at Hardins Landing, Kentucky.
Mary F. Perley	United States	The paddle steamer burned at Alki Point in Puget Sound.
SMS Wacht	Imperial German Navy	The Wacht-class aviso sank after a colliding with the ironclad SMS Sachsen (Imperial German Navy) off Germany. All crew survived.

=== 8 September ===
List of shipwrecks: 8 September 1901
Ship	State	Description
Twilight	United States	The steamer struck an obstruction entering Periwig and sank to her main deck. Pumped out on 11 September and towed to Camden, New Jersey for repairs.

=== 15 September ===
List of shipwrecks: 15 September 1901
Ship	State	Description
Monitor	United States	The 15 GRT screw steamer sank in the Grand River in Ohio, possibly at Grand River itself. All six people on board survived.

=== 16 September ===
List of shipwrecks: 16 September 1901
Ship	State	Description
Hudson	United States	The steamer foundered in a heavy gale eight miles (13 km) off Eagle River in Lake Superior. Lost with all 24 crew.

=== 18 September ===
List of shipwrecks: 18 September 1901
Ship	State	Description
Seabright	United States	The steamer dragged anchor and was wrecked at the mouth of the Cape Fear River in a heavy gale and broke up.

=== 19 September ===
List of shipwrecks: 19 September 1901
Ship	State	Description
HMS Cobra	Royal Navy	The Cobra-class destroyer broke her back and sank due to design weakness near Cromer, Norfolk. 67 crew were lost.
Stewart	United States	The steamer was destroyed by fire at dock at Ogdensburg, New York.

=== 20 September ===
List of shipwrecks: 20 September 1901
Ship	State	Description
Fedora	United States	The steamer was destroyed by fire between Duluth, Minnesota and Ashland.
Hallette	United States	The steamer struck an obstruction and sank in the Mississippi River.

=== 23 September ===
List of shipwrecks: 23 September 1901
Ship	State	Description
City of Clifton	United States	The steamer struck an obstruction in the Mississippi River and sank in nine feet (3 m) of water. Raised and repaired.
Highland	United States	The steamer was destroyed by fire at the Marine Iron Works Dock in the Chicago River.

=== 24 September ===
List of shipwrecks: 24 September 1901
Ship	State	Description
Edna	United States	The ferry burned in the Missouri River off St. James, Nebraska, a total loss.
Unknown scow	United States	A dumper scow, under the tow of John Fleming (United States), capsized and sank off the Sandy Hook Light.

=== 26 September ===
List of shipwrecks: 26 September 1901
Ship	State	Description
Julia	United States	The steamer struck an obstruction in the Snag Island Chute in the Mississippi River and sank in four feet (1.2 m) of water. Later raised.

=== 29 September ===
List of shipwrecks: 29 September 1901
Ship	State	Description
Ella Ellinwood	United States	The three-masted schooner ran aground in smoke and mist on the coast of Lake Michigan south of Port Washington, Wisconsin, near Fox Point, 14 miles (23 km) north of the Milwaukee harbor entrance. Her crew abandoned ship in a yawl and survived. She became a total loss. He wreck lies within the boundaries of the Wisconsin Shipwreck Coast National Marine Sanctuary.

== October ==
=== 2 October ===
List of shipwrecks: 2 October 1901
Ship	State	Description
James A. Morris	United States	The tug was destroyed by fire off Sunnyside Island in the Hudson River.
M.M. Drake	United States	The steam barge sank in Lake Superior after colliding with the schooner barge Michigan (United States), which she was towing, while she was taking Michigan's crew off after Michigan began to sink during a gale. All crew from M. M. Drake and all but one crew member from Michigan, who drowned leaving M.M. Drake, were rescued by the cargo ships Crescent City and Northern Wave (both United States).
Michigan	United States	The schooner barge was abandoned when her seams parted and she began to sink during a gale with heavy seas on Lake Superior while she was under tow by the steam barge M.M. Drake (United States). She collided while M. M. Drake was taking off her crew. All but one of her crew was rescued before Michigan sank.

=== 4 October ===
List of shipwrecks: 4 October 1901
Ship	State	Description
Unknown canal boat	United States	A canal boat, under tow of E. C. Baker (United States), was sunk in a collision with Goldsboro (United States) off Wall Street, New York City, in the East River.

=== 6 October ===
List of shipwrecks: 6 October 1901
Ship	State	Description
Nannine	United States	The steamer burned at dock at Wilmington Island, Georgia.

=== 7 October ===
List of shipwrecks: 7 October 1901
Ship	State	Description
Lafayette	United States	The steamer caught fire off College Wharf in the Delaware River and was abandoned by her crew.

=== 10 October ===
List of shipwrecks: 10 October 1901
Ship	State	Description
Gowanus	United States	The steamer split a seam and sank at dock in Gowanus Creek. Later raised.

=== 13 October ===
List of shipwrecks: 13 October 1901
Ship	State	Description
City of Paris	United States	On 12 or 13 October the sternwheel paddle steamer was destroyed by fire while winter quarters on the Koyukuk River at Bergman, District of Alaska (66°30′N 152°53′W). The fire reportedly was started by people who had boarded her in a search for liquor to steal.

=== 14 October ===
List of shipwrecks: 14 October 1901
Ship	State	Description
Carrie Currens	United States	The steamer foundered in a storm while under tow between Port Eads, Louisiana and Port Arthur, Texas.

=== 18 October ===
List of shipwrecks: 18 October 1901
Ship	State	Description
State of Michigan	United States	The steamer sprung a leak and sank two miles (3.2 km) offshore between Muskegon, Michigan and White Lake.

=== 19 October ===
List of shipwrecks: 19 October 1901
Ship	State	Description
L'Esperance	Belgium	The F Alexander-owned cargo ship was wrecked off the Skalskar Lighthouse, Finland.
Samuel J. Christian	United States	The tug collided with John J. Albright (United States) and sank, a total loss. Her master, cook and fireman were killed.
Swallow	United States	The cargo steamer foundered in a gale 10 or 18 miles (29 km) west of Long Point, Ontario in Lake Erie. The crew made it to the barge Manitu that she had been towing.

=== 20 October ===
List of shipwrecks: 20 October 1901
Ship	State	Description
City of Cleveland	United States	The steamer in fog struck a rock and sank opposite Ballards Reef in the Detroit River.

=== 22 October ===
List of shipwrecks: 22 October 1901
Ship	State	Description
A. J. Goddard	United States	The Klondike Gold Rush-era sternwheeler was named after Seattle businessman Albert J. Goddard. She was built for use on the Upper Yukon River in Canada. Her prefabricated components were built in San Francisco and shipped to Skagway, Alaska. She sank in a storm on Lake Laberge on 22 October 1901. Her wreck was discovered in 2008.
Elizabeth	United States	The ferry caught fire off Jersey City. She returned to her slip and evacuated passengers and then was beached on Communipaw Flats.

=== 26 October ===
List of shipwrecks: 26 October 1901
Ship	State	Description
Helen Miller Gould	United States	The auxiliary fishing motor schooner was destroyed by fire at North Sydney, Nova Scotia.

=== 29 October ===
List of shipwrecks: 29 October 1901
Ship	State	Description
Bluestone	United States	The tug sank at her dock when her bow was caught under the dock by a rising tide resulting her flooding through the bunker holes.
Unknown barges	United States	Some barges, under tow of Thomas Purcell, Jr. (United States), were damaged in a collision with Buenaventura (United States) in the North River. They were towed to Communipaw Flats where they sank.
Unknown scow	United States	A scow capsized and sank off the Sandy Hook Light. One crewman killed.
Walrus	United States	The steamer burned between Edmonds, Washington and Ballard, Washington.

== November ==
=== 2 November ===
List of shipwrecks: 2 November 1901
Ship	State	Description
Phoenix	United States	The tow steamer was swept by the tide into a collision with another vessel and sank in San Francisco Bay. Raised and repaired. One crewman killed.

=== 4 November ===
List of shipwrecks: 4 November 1901
Ship	State	Description
Ondine	United States	The steamer struck an obstruction in the Mississippi River near Andalusia, Illinois and sank in seven feet (2.1 m) of water. Later raised and repaired.

=== 6 November ===
List of shipwrecks: 6 November 1901
Ship	State	Description
Ida L. Tebo	United States	The tug was sunk in a collision in Hell Gate with the tug Wrestler (United States).

=== 7 November ===
List of shipwrecks: 7 November 1901
Ship	State	Description
A. B. Taylor	United States	The steamer was destroyed by fire at Grand Haven, Michigan.

=== 9 November ===
List of shipwrecks: 9 November 1901
Ship	State	Description
G. W. Wright	United States	The tow steamer caught fire and sank at a dock at Ninety Ninth Street in the North River.
Oriole	United States	While towing the barges Nome City and Reception (United States), the 6 GRT, 33.7-foot (10.3 m) steamship was carried out by ice and wrecked on the beach on the coast of the District of Alaska at the entrance to Kotzebue Sound about 10 nautical miles (19 km; 12 mi) east of Cape Espenberg. Her crew survived.
Valkyrie	United Kingdom	The German steamship Tijuca accidentally rammed the 2,270 GRT British sailing ship Valkyrie in the River Elbe off Brockdorf, sinking her.

=== 10 November ===
List of shipwrecks: 10 November 1901
Ship	State	Description
S. S. Brewster	United States	The steamer was trapped under a dock by the rising tide and was flooded and sunk at Georgetown, South Carolina.

=== 12 November ===
List of shipwrecks: 12 November 1901
Ship	State	Description
White Abbey	United Kingdom	The steam collier, on a voyage from Preston to Carrickfergus with coal, foundered off the coast of Groomsport, County Down, Ireland, in a heavy storm and was declared a total loss. The captain and his eight crew were lost. (The wreck was later raised and rebuilt in 1902.)

=== 14 November ===
List of shipwrecks: 14 November 1901
Ship	State	Description
Beauchamp	Royal National Lifeboat Institution	The local lifeboat capsized off Caister-on-Sea, Norfolk, England, with the loss of nine lives. Three of her crew rescued.
Richmond	United States	The passenger steamer burned at Fredericksburg, Virginia.
Wenona	United States	The steamer was sunk in a collision with Regulator (United States) in the Willamette River off Post Office Bar, Oregon.

=== 16 November ===
List of shipwrecks: 16 November 1901
Ship	State	Description
Paul Le Roux	United States	The steamer was destroyed by fire at dock in Rensselaer, New York.
Titania	United Kingdom	The barquentine, owned by Bowring Brothers, was wrecked in Pound Bay, Trepassey, Newfoundland, with loss of one crewmenber.

=== 19 November ===
List of shipwrecks: 19 November 1901
Ship	State	Description
Fred Hartweg	United States	The steamer struck an obstruction and sank in the Mississippi River.

=== 20 November ===
List of shipwrecks: 20 November 1901
Ship	State	Description
Vigilant	United States	The dredge was destroyed by fire near Blair, Pennsylvania due to gas escaping from the river bed while dredging being ignited by her furnace.

=== 22 November ===
List of shipwrecks: 22 November 1901
Ship	State	Description
Fritz	United States	The steamer struck an obstruction and sank in the Mississippi River while on the way to assist Fred Hartweg. Raised and repaired.

=== 23 November ===
List of shipwrecks: 23 November 1901
Ship	State	Description
Robert Haddon	United States	The tug drifted onto the beach at Long Branch, New Jersey after losing her rudder. Total loss.
Unknown barge	United States	A barge, under the tow of Navigator (United States), was cut loose by her tow when a gale hit them off Manasquon, New Jersey and was blown ashore.

=== 24 November ===
List of shipwrecks: 24 November 1901
Ship	State	Description
Grant	United States	The barge was driven ashore 12 miles (19 km) north of Barnegat, New Jersey in a severe storm after breaking loose from the tug Eureka (United States). All crewmen killed.
Wilmore	United States	The barge was driven ashore 12 miles (19 km) north of Barnegat, New Jersey in a severe storm after breaking loose from the tug Eureka (United States). One crewman killed.

=== 27 November ===
List of shipwrecks: 27 November 1901
Ship	State	Description
John K. Speed	United States	The steamer struck an obstruction and sank in the Mississippi River near Presidents Island three miles (4.8 km) below Memphis, Tennessee.

=== 28 November ===
List of shipwrecks: 28 November 1901
Ship	State	Description
Merle Spalding	United States	The laid up steamer burned at Read's Landing Bay, Wisconsin, a total loss.

=== 29 November ===
List of shipwrecks: 29 November 1901
Ship	State	Description
O. A. Crandall	United States	The tug was sunk by ice, probably near Albany, New York.
Occoquan	United States	The steamer burned in Occoquan Creek on the Potomac River.

=== 30 November ===
List of shipwrecks: 30 November 1901
Ship	State	Description
Chilian	United States	The 248 GRT bark was lost when she struck a rock on the south side of Dutch Harbor on Amaknak Island in the Aleutian Islands. She was abandoned and was sold at auction on 7 December.
Fearless	United States	The 248-ton steam whaling bark was lost when she struck a rock while at anchor on the south side of Dutch Harbor on Amaknak Island in the Aleutian Islands. Her crew of 28 survived.
San Rafael	United States	The ferry collided with Sausalito (United States) and sank in San Francisco Bay in dense fog. One crewman and two passengers killed.

== December ==
=== 1 December ===
List of shipwrecks: 1 December 1901
Ship	State	Description
Skagit Chief	United States	The steamer ran aground in thick fog on Orchard Rocks, Washington in Puget Sound and broke in two.

=== 3 December ===
List of shipwrecks: 3 December 1901
Ship	State	Description
Clara Brown	United States	The steamer broached and was driven ashore at Alki Point, Washington.

=== 4 December ===
List of shipwrecks: 4 December 1901
Ship	State	Description
C.H. Wheeler	United States	C.H. Wheeler The schooner-rigged unpowered barge, adrift in the Pacific Ocean since her tow line broke on 27 November, was wrecked on the coast of Oregon near Yaquina Bay with the loss of one life. The barge's three survivors were rescued by a United States Life-Saving Service crew on the beach.

=== 7 December ===
List of shipwrecks: 7 December 1901
Ship	State	Description
Rodney	United Kingdom	The cargo ship was wrecked on the coast of Cornwall.

=== 8 December ===
List of shipwrecks: 8 December 1901
Ship	State	Description
Idlehour	United States	The steamer burned to the waterline at dock at Elmwood Beach in the Niagara River.

=== 9 December ===
List of shipwrecks: 9 December 1901
Ship	State	Description
Unknown barge	United States	A barge, under the tow of Transfer No. 4 (United States), was sunk in a collision with coal boats under the tow of Robert Robinson (United States) in the East River.

=== 13 December ===
List of shipwrecks: 13 December 1901
Ship	State	Description
R. A. Speed	United States	The steamer was destroyed by fire lying at Paducah, Kentucky.

=== 15 December ===
List of shipwrecks: 15 December 1901
Ship	State	Description
Agnes	United States	The tow steamer filled with water and sank at the Atlantic Dock in Brooklyn. Later raised.
L. F. Malini	United States	The steamer was destroyed by fire in Harveys Canal, Louisiana.
Sindia	United States	During a voyage from Kobe, Japan, to New York City, with a cargo of china, porcelain vases, bamboo, camphor, and manganese, the 3,068 GRT bark ran aground at Ocean City, New Jersey, during a storm. Her crew of 34 was rescued and most of her cargo was salvaged. Her wreck was a tourist attraction for many years, but eventually became buried in the sand.

=== 17 December ===
List of shipwrecks: 17 December 1901
Ship	State	Description
Luna	United States	The steamer struck a snag and sank in the Red River off Shady Grove Landing.
Ruth	United States	The steamer struck a snag and sank in 15 feet (4.6 m) of water in the Willamette River off Corvallis, Oregon.
San Blas	United States	The steamer was wrecked five miles (8.0 km) north of La Libertad, El Salvador.

=== 18 December ===
List of shipwrecks: 18 December 1901
Ship	State	Description
J. E. Rumbell	United States	The steamer sank at dock at Marinette, Wisconsin.
Oscoda	United States	The steamer sank in the Chicago River due to a broke plank. Pumped out and raised.

=== 19 December ===
List of shipwrecks: 19 December 1901
Ship	State	Description
Charlie Stone	United States	The steamer, tied up at Point Pleasant, West Virginia, sprung a leak, broke loose, capsized and drifted two miles (3.2 km) downstream before grounding.
Geo. D. Purdy	United States	The pleasure steamer was destroyed by fire at Verona, North Carolina.
Kanawha Belle	United States	The steamer ran over Dam #3 in the Great Kanawha River and sank in 20 feet (6 m) of water. Eight crewmen killed. The rest of the crew and four passengers were rescued by Calvert (United States). One of the passengers died on Calvert.

=== 21 December ===
List of shipwrecks: 21 December 1901
Ship	State	Description
Highland	United States	The steamer was sunk by ice in the Pocomoke River.
Pere Marquette 16	United States	The steamer was scuttled at Ludington, Michigan after she bottomed on a bar in a gale 200 yards (180 m) off the channel for the harbor causing steam pipes to break, killing one crewman and injuring two. The surviving crew were rescued by the United States Life Saving Service.

=== 23 December ===
List of shipwrecks: 23 December 1901
Ship	State	Description
James T. Easton	United States	The barge was sunk in a collision by Allan Joy (United States) in the Harbor Channel of Bridgeport, Connecticut.

=== 25 December ===
List of shipwrecks: 25 December 1901
Ship	State	Description
Sun	United States	The steamer burned and sank at Memphis, Tennessee. Four passengers, a woman and her child, plus a married couple, were killed.
T. C. Woodard	United States	The steamer burned to the water's edge at Spottsville, Kentucky.

=== 29 December ===
List of shipwrecks: 29 December 1901
Ship	State	Description
Clifford	United States	The anchored lighter was sunk when hit by Newburgh (United States) in dense fog off Ninety-fifth Street in the North River, Brooklyn. Later raised and repaired.

=== 31 December ===
List of shipwrecks: 31 December 1901
Ship	State	Description
Hero	Norway	The Kjaer & Isdal, (Bergen)-owned cargo ship ran aground between Baltimore, Ohio and Colón, Panama. The wreck was later refloated and sold.

=== Unknown date (December) ===
List of shipwrecks: Unknown December 1901
Ship	State	Description
HMS Condor	Royal Navy	During a voyage from Esquimalt, British Columbia, Canada, to Honolulu, Territory of Hawaii, the screw sloop-of-war disappeared after parting company with the armoured cruiser HMS Warspite (Royal Navy) on 2 December off British Columbia. She presumably foundered with the loss of all crew during a strong storm somewhere off Cape Flattery, Washington, on or about 3 December. One of her boats and wreckage later washed up on the coast of Vancouver Island and along the shore of Queen Charlotte Sound.
Matteawan	United States	Matteawan The steamship left Nanaimo, British Columbia on 2 December and was never seen again. Lost with all 33 crew.

== Unknown date ==
List of shipwrecks: Unknown date 1901
Ship	State	Description
Aloha	United States	The 445 GRT steamship was wrecked on the southeast tip of Hinchinbrook Island on the south-central coast of the District of Alaska. She became a total loss
Balaena	United States	The 390-net register ton, 149.5-foot (45.6 m) whaling steamer was wrecked on an uncharted reef off Saint Lawrence Island in the Bering Sea on either 1 May or 7 June, according to various sources. All 50 people on board – nine passengers and a crew of 41 – survived. Her captain and some crewmembers reach Nome, District of Alaska, with news of the wreck on 21 June, and the whaler Alexander immediately left Nome for Saint Lawrence Island, where she rescued the passengers and the rest of the crew from the beach.
Gardner	United States	The river steamer was lost at Jones Point (65°07′N 166°38′W) on the west-central coast of the District of Alaska.
Norman Sunde	United States	The schooner was wrecked on Five Fingers Island (57°17′30″N 133°40′15″W) in Southeast Alaska in 1900 or 1901.
Nor'West	United States	While laid up for the winter, the 8 GRT, 35.4-foot (10.8 m) schooner dragged her anchor during either the winter of 1901–1902 or the winter of 1902–1903 and was blown so far inland at the head of "Wrangell Bay" in the District of Alaska – probably Wrangell Bay (57°01′N 156°31′W) on Kodiak Island but possibly the harbor at Wrangell in Southeast Alaska – that she could not be relaunched. She was declared a total loss and was stripped and abandoned.
HMS Scorpion	Royal Navy	The decommissioned Scorpion-class ironclad turret ship was sunk as a target. She was refloated in 1902 to be sold for scrap.
