= Verona, North Carolina =

- Unincorporated Community
- Nickname: V-Town
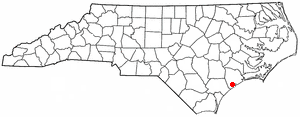
- Location of Verona, North Carolina
- Coordinates: 34°33′7″N 77°23′12″W
- Country: United States
- State: North Carolina
- County: Onslow

Area
  - Total: 1.6 sq mi (4.1 km^{2})
  - Land: 1.6 sq mi (4.1 km^{2})
  - Water: 0.0 sq mi (0 km^{2})
- Elevation: 26 ft (8 m)

Population (2000)
  - Total: 178
  - Density: 110/sq mi (42/km^{2})
- Time zone: UTC-5 (Eastern (EST))
  - Summer (DST): UTC-4 (EDT)
- ZIP code: 28540
- Area codes: 910, 472
- FIPS code: 37-62680
- GNIS feature ID: 0995050

Verona is a small unincorporated community in rural Onslow County, on the outskirts of Jacksonville, North Carolina, United States. It is located off U.S. Route 17, seven miles (11 km) to the south of Jacksonville, and ten miles (16 km) to the north of Holly Ridge. Verona is bordered by Highway 17 to the east, Verona Rd. to the north, and High Hill Rd. to the South. High Hill and Verona Rds. intersect to form the western boundary. The population of Verona in the 2000 census was approximately 178 people. The demographic breakdown was: Caucasian: 86%, Hispanic: 9%, African-American: < 5%, Other: < 2%.

== Overview ==
Most of Verona's population consists of middle class workers in the cities of Jacksonville, or Holly Ridge. The largest business is the Verona Quik Mart, a convenience store and gas station. The second largest business in Verona is the Jones LP gas and equipment service.

== Historical importance ==
There have been settlers in the Verona area since the early 18th century. Founding families of Verona, many of which are still there today include the Foy, Padgett, Rochelle, Ottoway, Brown, Davis, Fisher, and Parker families.

== Railroad ==
In 1897, The Wilmington, New Bern and Norfolk Railroad Company laid a railway from Jacksonville, to Wilmington, running through Verona. The Railway through Verona ran from 1897 to 1984, when the trains where shut down, and the tracks were torn up. Shortly after the tracks were laid, a large three story train station was built in Verona on the intersection of Loy Avenue and Verona Rd. Although the tracks operated until 1984, the Train Station shut down in the late 1940s. The Railway mostly carried lumber and industrial supplies from Jacksonville to Wilmington. During World War II, and the Korean War the railway played a vital role in the U.S. war effort as a troop train route. Marines were carried from the newly constructed Marine Corps Base Camp Lejeune to the port of Wilmington to be deployed.

The train station was torn down and the warehouse was used as Verona's Fire Department in 1961. From around 1900 to the 1960s, there was a post office in Verona, and Verona was given its address: Verona, NC. In the 1960s the county townships were reorganized, and Verona became part of rural Jacksonville, causing the address of Verona's citizens to change to Jacksonville, NC. Verona lost its post office and was put on the city postal route.

== United States Marine Corps Base Camp Lejeune ==
In the year 1941, the United States Government began building Marine Corps Base Camp Lejeune, the largest amphibious base in the country. To gain the property for the base, eminent domain was enforced condemning the lands of many Verona residents, some of whom lost land that had been in their families for over a century.
