= Half Moon, North Carolina =

- CDP
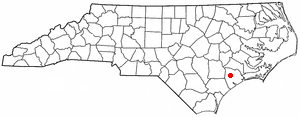
- Location of Half Moon, North Carolina
- Coordinates: 34°49′47″N 77°27′33″W
- Country: United States
- State: North Carolina
- County: Onslow

Area
  - Total: 7.42 sq mi (19.22 km^{2})
  - Land: 7.42 sq mi (19.22 km^{2})
  - Water: 0 sq mi (0.00 km^{2})
- Elevation: 33 ft (10 m)

Population (2020)
  - Total: 7,543
  - Density: 1,016.4/sq mi (392.44/km^{2})
- Time zone: UTC-5 (Eastern (EST))
  - Summer (DST): UTC-4 (EDT)
- FIPS code: 37-28900
- GNIS feature ID: 2402561

Half Moon is a census-designated place (CDP) in Onslow County, North Carolina, United States. As of the 2020 census, Half Moon had a population of 7,543. It is part of the Jacksonville, North Carolina Metropolitan Statistical Area.

== Geography ==
According to the United States Census Bureau, the CDP has a total area of 4.3 square miles (11 km^{2}), all land.

== Demographics ==
Historical population
Census	Pop.	Note	%±
2020	7,543		—
U.S. Decennial Census

=== 2020 census ===
As of the 2020 census, Half Moon had a population of 7,543. The median age was 34.1 years. 24.8% of residents were under the age of 18 and 12.6% of residents were 65 years of age or older. For every 100 females there were 91.1 males, and for every 100 females age 18 and over there were 86.2 males age 18 and over.

90.6% of residents lived in urban areas, while 9.4% lived in rural areas.

There were 2,825 households in Half Moon and 2,027 families residing in the CDP. Of all households, 34.8% had children under the age of 18 living in them, 51.9% were married-couple households, 16.3% were households with a male householder and no spouse or partner present, and 24.8% were households with a female householder and no spouse or partner present. About 20.5% of all households were made up of individuals and 7.3% had someone living alone who was 65 years of age or older.

There were 3,100 housing units, of which 8.9% were vacant. The homeowner vacancy rate was 3.1% and the rental vacancy rate was 9.0%.

Half Moon racial composition
Race	Number	Percentage
White (non-Hispanic)	4,100	54.36%
Black or African American (non-Hispanic)	1,580	20.95%
Native American	46	0.61%
Asian	183	2.43%
Pacific Islander	49	0.65%
Other/Mixed	674	8.94%
Hispanic or Latino	911	12.08%

=== 2000 census ===
As of the census of 2000, there were 6,645 people, 2,261 households, and 1,817 families residing in the CDP. The population density was 1,548.1 inhabitants per square mile (597.7/km^{2}). There were 2,398 housing units at an average density of 558.7 per square mile (215.7/km^{2}). The racial makeup of the CDP was 65.13% White, 24.47% African American, 0.57% Native American, 2.59% Asian, 0.17% Pacific Islander, 2.75% from other races, and 4.32% from two or more races. Hispanic or Latino of any race were 6.71% of the population.

There were 2,261 households, out of which 47.3% had children under the age of 18 living with them, 64.0% were married couples living together, 13.6% had a female householder with no husband present, and 19.6% were non-families. 14.0% of all households were made up of individuals, and 2.2% had someone living alone who was 65 years of age or older. The average household size was 2.94 and the average family size was 3.22.

In the CDP, the population was spread out, with 32.4% under the age of 18, 12.7% from 18 to 24, 33.8% from 25 to 44, 17.1% from 45 to 64, and 4.0% who were 65 years of age or older. The median age was 28 years. For every 100 females, there were 98.2 males. For every 100 females age 18 and over, there were 95.4 males.

The median income for a household in the CDP was $41,143, and the median income for a family was $42,357. Males had a median income of $27,730 versus $20,698 for females. The per capita income for the CDP was $15,233. About 5.9% of families and 7.7% of the population were below the poverty line, including 11.1% of those under age 18 and 8.1% of those age 65 or over.
