= Onslow County, North Carolina =

County in North Carolina, United States

- County
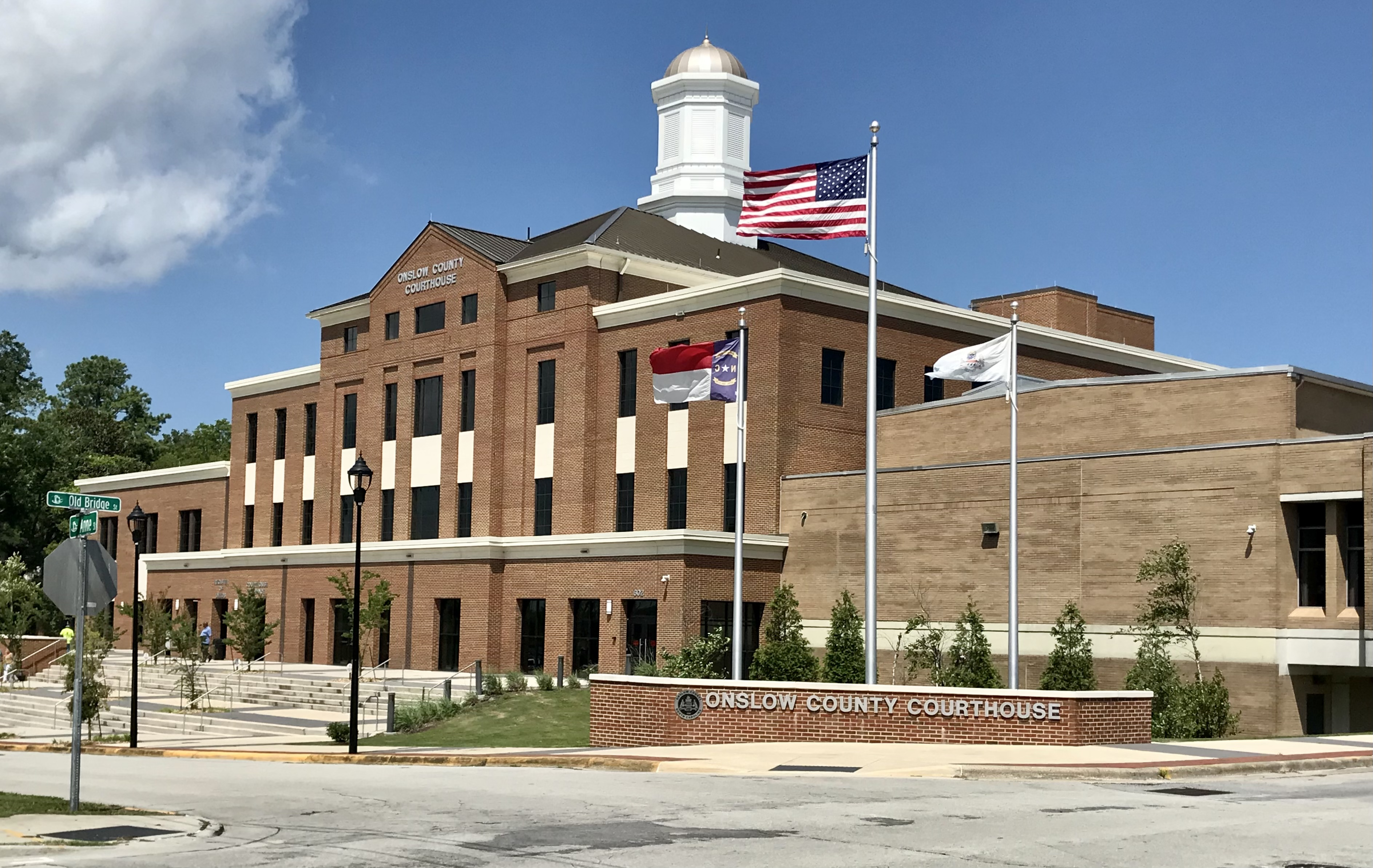
- Onslow County Courthouse

- Flag Seal Logo

- Location within the U.S. state of North Carolina
- Coordinates: 34.76°N 77.50°W
- Country: United States
- State: North Carolina
- Founded: 1734
- Named for: Arthur Onslow
- Seat: Jacksonville
- Largest community: Jacksonville

Area
  - Total: 905.20 sq mi (2,344.5 km^{2})
  - Land: 762.08 sq mi (1,973.8 km^{2})
  - Water: 143.12 sq mi (370.7 km^{2}) 15.81%

Population (2020)
  - Total: 204,576
  - Estimate (2025): 217,175 ▲
  - Density: 268.44/sq mi (103.65/km^{2})
- Time zone: UTC−5 (Eastern)
  - Summer (DST): UTC−4 (EDT)
- Congressional district: 3rd
- Website: www.onslowcountync.gov

Onslow County is a county located in the U.S. state of North Carolina. As of the 2020 census, the population was 204,576. Its county seat is Jacksonville. The county was created in 1734 as Onslow Precinct and gained county status in 1739. Onslow County comprises the Jacksonville, NC Metropolitan Statistical Area. The southern border of the county is the coast of the Atlantic Ocean.

== History ==
European, mainly English, settlers arrived here in 1713 in what was originally part of the colonial precincts of Carteret and New Hanover. Onslow County was formed in 1734 and was named for Arthur Onslow, the longest serving speaker of the House of Commons. After a lethal 1752 hurricane, the county courthouse was relocated from Town Point to Wantland's Ferry; this settlement was eventually incorporated in 1842 and named Jacksonville after President Andrew Jackson. Through much of the first half of the 20th century, the county was largely rural, with an economy based on agrarian and maritime communities.

During World War II, Onslow County was dramatically changed in the early 1940s with the establishment of the United States Army Camp Davis near Holly Ridge (now defunct), and the creation of Camp Lejeune in 1941. About 2,400 residents were displaced to allow for the acquisition. This increased county population and generated related growth in housing and businesses.

Onslow County's flat, gently rolling terrain covers 767 square miles (1,990 km^{2}) and is located in the southeastern coastal plain of North Carolina, about 120 miles (190 km) east of Raleigh and 50 miles (80 km) north of Wilmington. The city of Jacksonville is the county seat, and the areas surrounding the city constitute the major population centers and growth areas in the county. The county is home to more than 200,000 people and includes the incorporated towns of Holly Ridge, Richlands, Swansboro, North Topsail Beach, part of Surf City and unincorporated Sneads Ferry. The U.S. Marine Corps Base, Camp Lejeune, comprises roughly 156,000 acres (630 km^{2}); more than 43,000 marines and sailors are stationed there.

== Geography ==
Interactive map of Onslow County

According to the U.S. Census Bureau, the county has a total area of 905.20 square miles (2,344.5 km^{2}), of which 762.08 square miles (1,973.8 km^{2}) are land and 143.12 square miles (370.7 km^{2}) (15.81%) are covered by water. It is bordered by Jones County, Carteret County, Pender County, and Duplin County.

=== Wildlife ===
The New River and its vicinity is sometimes inhabited by bald eagles, dolphins, and cownose rays.

=== State and local protected areas ===
- Bear Island Area Outstanding Resource Water
- Croatan Game Land (part)
- Hammocks Beach State Park
- Hofmann Forest (part)
- North Carolina National Estuarine Research Reserve
- Onslow Beach
- Permuda Island
- Primary Nursery Areas
- Rocky Run Game Land
- Sandy Run Savannas State Natural Area (part)
- Sea Turtle Sanctuary
- Stones Creek Game Land
- Stump Sound Area Outstanding Resource Water
- White Oak River Game Land
- White Oak River Mechanical Harvesting of Oysters Prohibited Area (part)
- White Oak River Impoundment Game Land (part)

=== Major water bodies ===
- Atlantic Ocean (North Atlantic Ocean)
- Intracoastal Waterway
- New River
- Onslow Bay
- Queen Creek
- Stones Bay
- White Oak River

=== Major highways ===
- US 17
  - US 17 Bus.
- US 258
- NC 24
  - NC 24 Bus.
- NC 50
- NC 53
- NC 111
- NC 172
- NC 210

=== Major infrastructure ===
- Albert J. Ellis Airport, located in Richlands and is served by two commercial airlines.
- Amtrak Thruway (Jacksonville)
- Marine Corps Air Station New River, military base in Jacksonville
- Marine Corps Base Camp Lejeune, military training facility in Jacksonville

== Demographics ==
Historical population
Census	Pop.	Note	%±
1790	5,387		—
1800	5,623		4.4%
1810	6,669		18.6%
1820	7,016		5.2%
1830	7,814		11.4%
1840	7,527		−3.7%
1850	8,283		10.0%
1860	8,856		6.9%
1870	7,569		−14.5%
1880	9,829		29.9%
1890	10,303		4.8%
1900	11,940		15.9%
1910	14,125		18.3%
1920	14,703		4.1%
1930	15,289		4.0%
1940	17,939		17.3%
1950	42,047		134.4%
1960	82,706		96.7%
1970	103,126		24.7%
1980	112,784		9.4%
1990	149,838		32.9%
2000	150,355		0.3%
2010	177,772		18.2%
2020	204,576		15.1%
2025 (est.)	217,175	▲	6.2%
U.S. Decennial Census; 1790–1960 1900–1990; 1990–2000 2010 2020

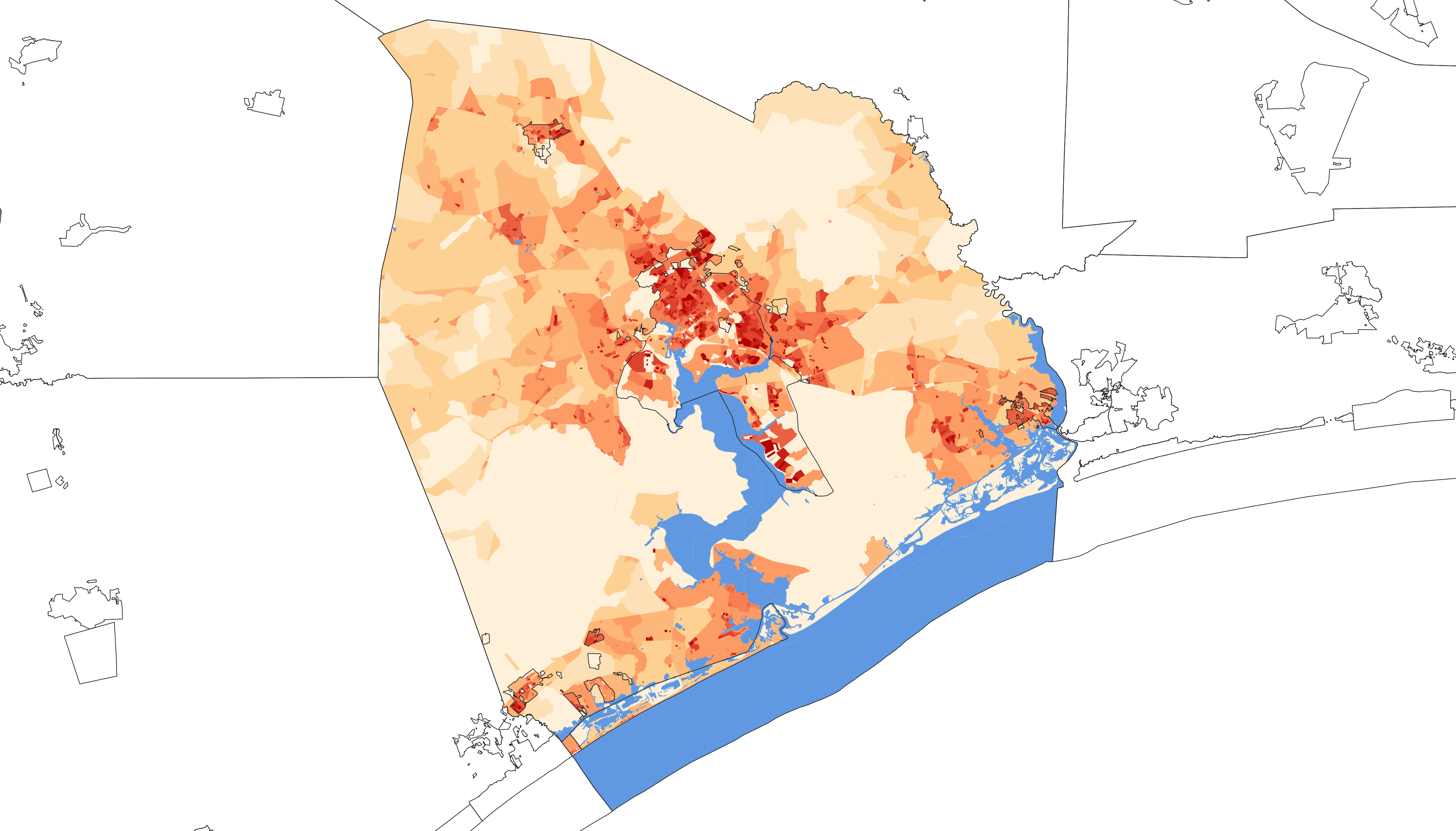
2020 population density of Onslow County NC by census block

=== 2020 census ===
Onslow County, North Carolina – Racial and ethnic composition Note: the US Census treats Hispanic/Latino as an ethnic category. This table excludes Latinos from the racial categories and assigns them to a separate category. Hispanics/Latinos may be of any race.
Race / Ethnicity (NH = Non-Hispanic)	Pop 1980	Pop 1990	Pop 2000	Pop 2010	Pop 2020	% 1980	% 1990	% 2000	% 2010	% 2020
White alone (NH)	83,741	108,890	104,600	122,558	129,499	74.25%	72.67%	69.57%	68.94%	63.30%
Black or African American alone (NH)	22,410	29,137	27,162	26,577	26,939	19.87%	19.45%	18.07%	14.95%	13.17%
Native American or Alaska Native alone (NH)	597	867	971	1,013	1,019	0.53%	0.58%	0.65%	0.57%	0.50%
Asian alone (NH)	1,417	2,740	2,454	3,163	4,508	1.26%	1.83%	1.63%	1.78%	2.20%
Native Hawaiian or Pacific Islander alone (NH)	x	x	259	438	777	x	x	0.17%	0.25%	0.38%
Other race alone (NH)	246	169	355	290	1,148	0.22%	0.11%	0.24%	0.16%	0.56%
Mixed race or Multiracial (NH)	x	x	3,658	5,837	13,045	x	x	2.43%	3.28%	6.38%
Hispanic or Latino (any race)	4,373	8,035	10,896	17,896	27,641	3.88%	5.36%	7.25%	10.07%	13.51%
Total	112,784	149,838	150,355	177,772	204,576	100.00%	100.00%	100.00%	100.00%	100.00%

As of the 2020 census, there were 204,576 people, 69,576 households, and 46,202 families residing in the county.

The median age was 28.3 years. 23.0% of residents were under the age of 18 and 10.5% of residents were 65 years of age or older. For every 100 females there were 117.7 males, and for every 100 females age 18 and over there were 122.2 males age 18 or over.

The racial makeup of the county was 67.0% White, 13.7% Black or African American, 0.7% American Indian and Alaska Native, 2.3% Asian, 0.4% Native Hawaiian and Pacific Islander, 5.0% from some other race, and 10.9% from two or more races. Hispanic or Latino residents of any race comprised 13.5% of the population.

About 63.7% of residents lived in urban areas, while 36.3% lived in rural areas.

There were 69,576 households in the county, of which 35.9% had children under the age of 18 living in them. Of all households, 53.2% were married-couple households, 16.9% were households with a male householder and no spouse or partner present, and 23.5% were households with a female householder and no spouse or partner present. About 23.4% of all households were made up of individuals and 8.0% had someone living alone who was 65 years of age or older.

There were 84,180 housing units, of which 17.3% were vacant. Among occupied housing units, 59.8% were owner-occupied and 40.2% were renter-occupied; the homeowner vacancy rate was 2.9% and the rental vacancy rate was 10.4%.

=== 2000 census ===
At the 2000 census, 150,355 people, 48,122 households, and 36,572 families resided in the county. The population density was 196 people per square mile (76 people/km^{2}). The 55,726 housing units averaged 73 units per square mile (28 units/km^{2}). The racial makeup of the county was 72.06% White, 18.48% African American, 0.74% Native American, 1.68% Asian, 0.19% Pacific Islander, 3.62% from other races, and 3.22% from two or more races. About 7.25% of the population were Hispanic or Latino of any race.

Of the 48,122 households, 42.60% had children under the age of 18 living with them, 61.00% were married couples living together, 11.60% had a female householder with no husband present, and 24.00% were not families. About 18.60% of all households were made up of individuals, and 5.20% had someone living alone who was 65 years of age or older. The average household size was 2.72 and the average family size was 3.09.

In the county, the population was distributed as 26.20% under the age of 18, 23.80% from 18 to 24, 29.20% from 25 to 44, 14.40% from 45 to 64, and 6.30% who were 65 years of age or older. The median age was 25 years. For every 100 females, there were 123.20 males. For every 100 females age 18 and over, there were 131.30 males.

The median income for a household in the county was $33,756, and for a family was $36,692. Males had a median income of $22,061 versus $20,094 for females. The per capita income for the county was $14,853. About 10.80% of families and 12.90% of the population were below the poverty line, including 16.70% of those under age 18 and 14.70% of those age 65 or over.

== Government and politics ==
Onslow is a typical Solid South county in its voting patterns. Except for the 1928 election, when anti-Catholic sentiment allowed Herbert Hoover to carry the county over Al Smith, it was solidly Democratic until 1968, during the FDR years by margins of as much as 13 to one in 1936. However, the 1960s onwards had Onslow turn to George Wallace in 1968 and then overwhelmingly to Richard Nixon over George McGovern in 1972. Since then, Onslow has become a strongly Republican county; the last Democrat to carry it was Jimmy Carter in 1976, and Carter in 1980 remains the last of his party to top 40%. Kamala Harris received only 31 percent of the county vote in 2024.

United States presidential election results for Onslow County, North Carolina
Year	Republican		Democratic		Third party(ies)	
Year	No.	%	No.	%	No.	%
1880	537	33.11%	1,085	66.89%	0	0.00%
1884	504	28.06%	1,292	71.94%	0	0.00%
1888	453	27.79%	1,177	72.21%	0	0.00%
1892	379	19.42%	1,137	58.25%	436	22.34%
1896	589	27.42%	1,559	72.58%	0	0.00%
1900	618	31.86%	1,322	68.14%	0	0.00%
1904	451	33.78%	828	62.02%	56	4.19%
1908	710	44.94%	870	55.06%	0	0.00%
1912	66	4.35%	901	59.39%	550	36.26%
1916	785	39.53%	1,197	60.27%	4	0.20%
1920	853	35.39%	1,557	64.61%	0	0.00%
1924	423	26.84%	1,122	71.19%	31	1.97%
1928	1,253	53.89%	1,072	46.11%	0	0.00%
1932	253	8.79%	2,615	90.89%	9	0.31%
1936	235	7.85%	2,758	92.15%	0	0.00%
1940	271	10.21%	2,383	89.79%	0	0.00%
1944	433	13.77%	2,711	86.23%	0	0.00%
1948	316	8.32%	3,318	87.34%	165	4.34%
1952	1,261	22.78%	4,275	77.22%	0	0.00%
1956	1,626	25.74%	4,692	74.26%	0	0.00%
1960	2,812	33.57%	5,564	66.43%	0	0.00%
1964	3,771	38.77%	5,955	61.23%	0	0.00%
1968	3,444	28.08%	3,281	26.75%	5,542	45.18%
1972	10,343	80.05%	2,424	18.76%	154	1.19%
1976	5,953	42.61%	7,954	56.94%	63	0.45%
1980	8,861	52.95%	7,371	44.04%	504	3.01%
1984	13,928	70.75%	5,713	29.02%	46	0.23%
1988	12,253	62.87%	7,162	36.75%	73	0.37%
1992	11,842	48.70%	8,045	33.08%	4,431	18.22%
1996	13,396	55.70%	8,685	36.11%	1,968	8.18%
2000	19,657	65.06%	10,269	33.99%	289	0.96%
2004	25,890	69.45%	11,250	30.18%	137	0.37%
2008	30,278	60.31%	19,499	38.84%	426	0.85%
2012	32,243	62.69%	18,490	35.95%	702	1.36%
2016	37,122	64.97%	17,514	30.65%	2,499	4.37%
2020	46,078	63.79%	24,266	33.59%	1,891	2.62%
2024	54,960	67.29%	25,684	31.44%	1,037	1.27%

Onslow County is a member of the regional Eastern Carolina Council of Governments.

The structure of local government in Onslow County was changed in 2016 to have seven commissioners in 2018 board of commissioners, all elected at-large for four-year terms. In contrast to electing members from districts, this structure means that candidates are elected by the majority population in the county, which gives a more accurate view of the entire electorate. On November 8, 2016, citizens voted in favor to alter the number of commissioners from five commissioners with concurrent terms to seven with staggered terms. In 2018, citizens elected two more county commissioners in the general election on November 6, 2018, to four-year terms. The citizens of the county will elect five commissioners in 2020, but the four candidates who receive the highest number of votes in the general election of 2020 will receive a four-year term and the candidate who receives the fifth-highest number of votes in the general election of 2020 to a two-year term. Thereafter, all county commissioners would be elected to serve four-year terms. The board establishes policies and ordinances implemented by the county manager and his staff. Commissioners are Jack Bright (chair), Royce Bennett (vice chair), Paul Buchanan, Robin Knapp, Mark Price, Tim Foster, and William Shanahan.

In the North Carolina Senate, Onslow County is located in the 6th Senate district, which is represented by Republican Michael Lazzara. In the North Carolina House of Representatives, Onslow County is split into three House districts with the 14th and 15th house districts completely in Onslow County and the 16th House district in part of Onslow County and all of neighboring Pender County. The 14th district is represented by Republican George Cleveland, the 15th district is represented by Republican Phil Shepard, and the 16th district is represented by Republican Carson Smith.

The main law enforcement agency for Onslow County is the County Sheriff's Department. The elected sheriff is Chris Thomas.

== Education ==
Onslow County Schools serves the county, except for Camp Lejeune and Marine Corps Air Station New River, which are served by Department of Defense Education Activity (DoDEA) schools.

== Communities ==
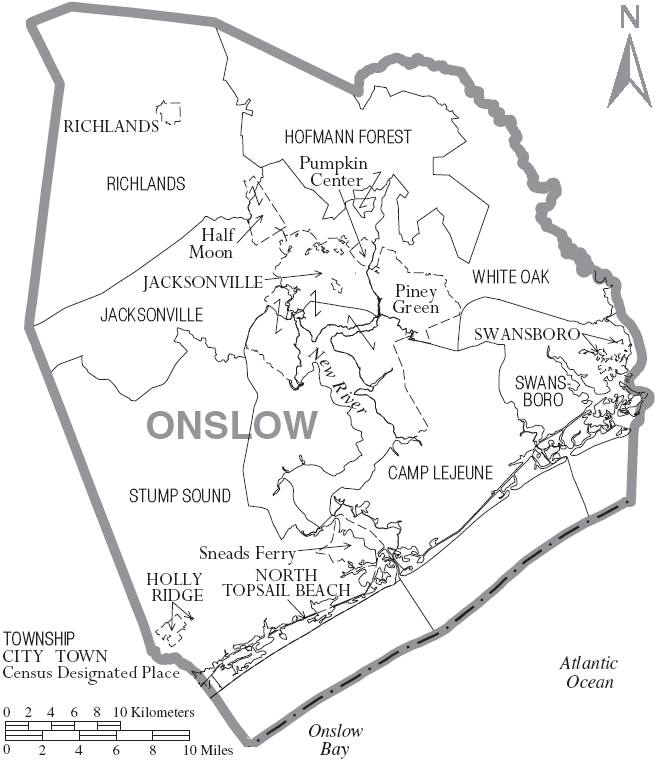
Map of Onslow County with municipal and township labels

=== Cities ===
- Jacksonville (county seat and largest community)

=== Towns ===
- Holly Ridge
- North Topsail Beach
- Richlands
- Surf City (also in Pender County)
- Swansboro

=== Unincorporated communities ===
- Hubert
- Verona
- Haws Run
- Back Swamp

=== Census-designated places ===
- Half Moon
- Piney Green
- Pumpkin Center
- Sneads Ferry

=== Townships ===
- Camp Lejeune UT
- Hofmann Forest UT
- Jacksonville
- Richlands
- Stump Sound
- Swansboro
- White Oak

Camp Lejeune and Hofmann Forest are classified as unorganized territories instead of townships.

== See also ==
- List of counties in North Carolina
- National Register of Historic Places listings in Onslow County, North Carolina
- Camp Lejeune water contamination, water contamination event from 1953 to 1987
