= 1901 Louisiana hurricane =

Category 1 Atlantic hurricane in 1901

Hurricane Four 1901 Louisiana hurricane
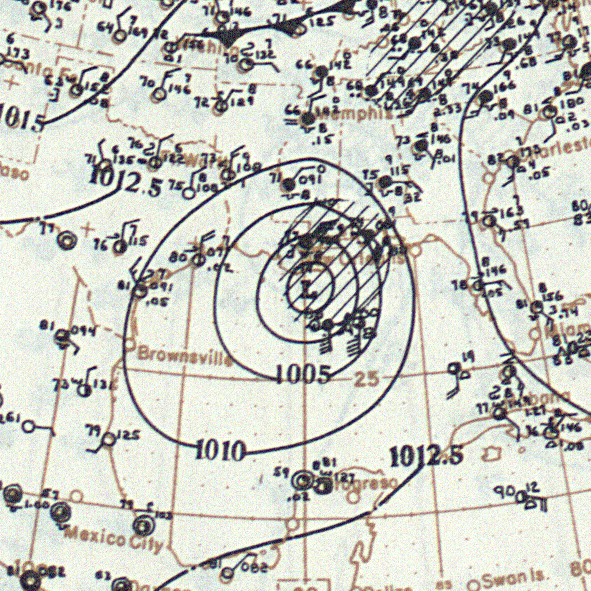
- Surface weather analysis on August 15, showing the hurricane over Southeast Louisiana

Meteorological history
- Formed: August 2, 1901
- Extratropical: August 17, 1901
- Dissipated: August 18, 1901

Category 1 hurricane
- 1-minute sustained (SSHWS/NWS)
- Highest winds: 90 mph (150 km/h)
- Lowest pressure: 973 mbar (hPa); 28.73 inHg

Overall effects
- Fatalities: 10–15
- Damage: $1 million (1901 USD)
- Areas affected: Florida, Gulf Coast of the United States
- IBTrACS
- Part of the 1901 Atlantic hurricane season

The 1901 Louisiana hurricane was the first hurricane to make landfall in Louisiana in the month of August or earlier since 1888. The fourth tropical cyclone and second hurricane of the season, this storm developed southwest of the Azores on August 2. Moving southwestward and later westward, the depression remained weak for several days, until strengthening into a tropical storm while approaching the Bahamas early on August 9. It then crossed through the islands and intensified only slightly. Late on August 10, the storm made landfall near Deerfield Beach, Florida. After reaching the Gulf of Mexico the next day, continuous intensifying occurred and by August 12, the storm reached hurricane status. Peaking with winds of 90 mph (145 km/h), it struck Louisiana late on August 14 and then Mississippi less than 24 hours later. The system weakened to a tropical storm early on August 16 and became extratropical several hours later.

Along portions of the east coast of Florida, "considerable damage" was reported due to strong winds. In Alabama, trees were uprooted, houses were de-roofed, and chimneys collapsed in Mobile. Some areas of the city were also inundated with up to 18 inches (460 mm) of water due to storm tide. Several yachts, schooners, and ships were wrecked or sunk, resulting in at least $70,000 (1901 USD) in damage. (Note: All damage figures are in 1901 USD, unless otherwise noted) However, due to warnings by the Weather Bureau, the Mobile Chamber of Commerce estimated that several millions of dollars in damage was evaded. All towns along the coast of Mississippi "suffered seriously". In Louisiana, severe damage was reported at some towns due to strong winds and high tides. The community of Port Eads reported that only the lighthouse was not destroyed, while other sources state that an office building also remained standing. In New Orleans, overflowing levees inundated numerous streets. Outside the city, crops suffered severely, particularly rice. Overall, the storm caused 10–15 deaths and $1 million in damage.

== Meteorological history ==
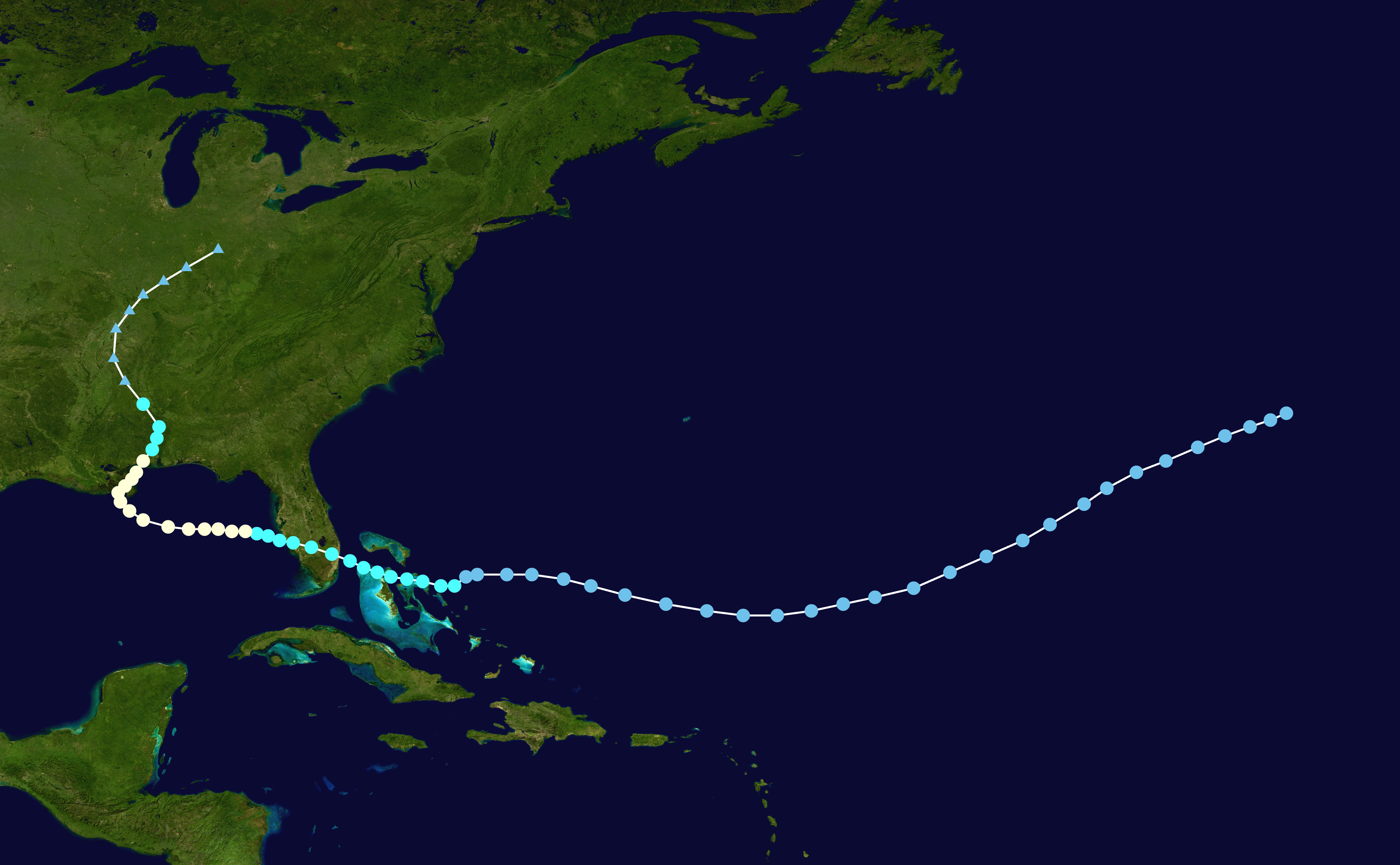
Map plotting the storm's track and intensity, according to the Saffir–Simpson scale Map key Saffir–Simpson scale Tropical depression (≤38 mph, ≤62 km/h) Tropical storm (39–73 mph, 63–118 km/h) Category 1 (74–95 mph, 119–153 km/h) Category 2 (96–110 mph, 154–177 km/h) Category 3 (111–129 mph, 178–208 km/h) Category 4 (130–156 mph, 209–251 km/h) Category 5 (≥157 mph, ≥252 km/h) Unknown Storm type Tropical cyclone Subtropical cyclone Extratropical cyclone, remnant low, tropical disturbance, or monsoon depression

A tropical depression developed about 615 miles (990 km) southwest of Flores Island, Azores at 0000 UTC on August 2. The depression moved southwestward and remained weak for several days. On August 5, it re-curved west-southwestward and then westward while passing north of the Lesser Antilles. The next day, the system curved west-northwestward and briefly to the west on August 8. Finally, the depression strengthened into a tropical storm at 0000 UTC on August 9, while located about 50 miles (80 km) northeast of Cat Island, Bahamas. Around that time, the Weather Bureau first observed a "feeble disturbance in the subtropical north of Cuba." Between August 9 and August 10, the storm strengthened slightly further and moved through the Bahamas, passing over Cat Island and the Berry Islands. Around 2200 UTC on August 10, the system made landfall near Deerfield Beach, Florida with winds of 45 mph (70 km/h).

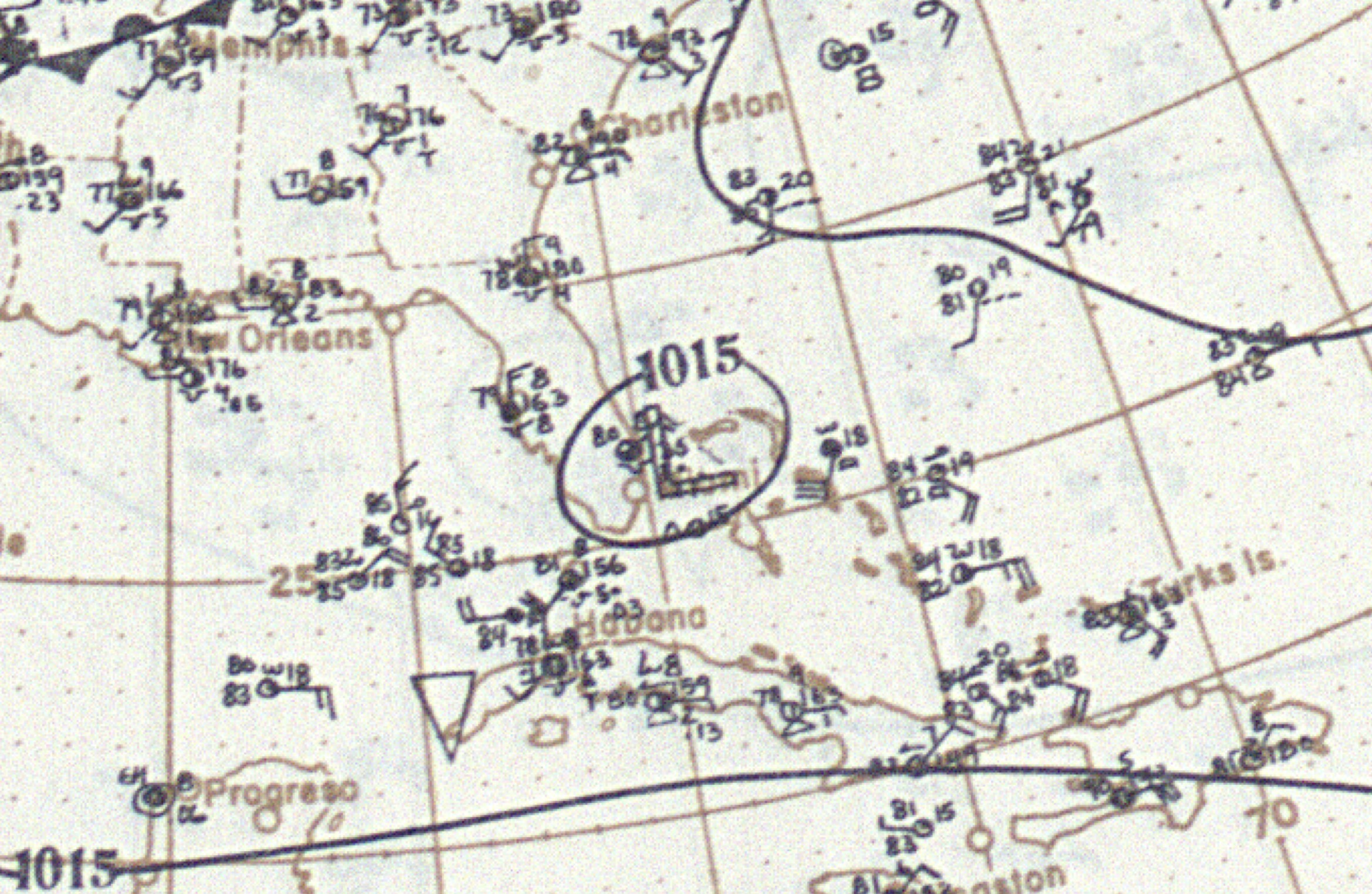
Weather map of the storm nearing landfall in Florida on August 10

Early on August 11, the storm weakened slightly while crossing Florida. It then decelerated and reached the eastern Gulf of Mexico several hours later. Thereafter, the system began to re-strengthen and became a Category 1 hurricane on the modern-day Saffir–Simpson hurricane wind scale at 1200 UTC on August 12. Early the next day, the storm attained its maximum sustained wind speed of 90 mph (145 km/h). It weakened slightly early on August 14 and curved northwestward while approaching the coast of Louisiana. At 2100 UTC, the storm made landfall near Buras with winds of 85 mph (135 km/h). Curving northeastward, the hurricane re-emerged into the Gulf of Mexico early on August 15. However, around 1700 UTC, it made another landfall near Ocean Springs, Mississippi at the same intensity. Early on August 16, the system weakened to a tropical storm. It then weakened much quicker and transitioned into an extratropical cyclone over Mississippi at 0000 UTC on August 17. The remnant extratropical cyclone persisted until late the next day, at which time it dissipated over Indiana.

== Preparations and impact ==
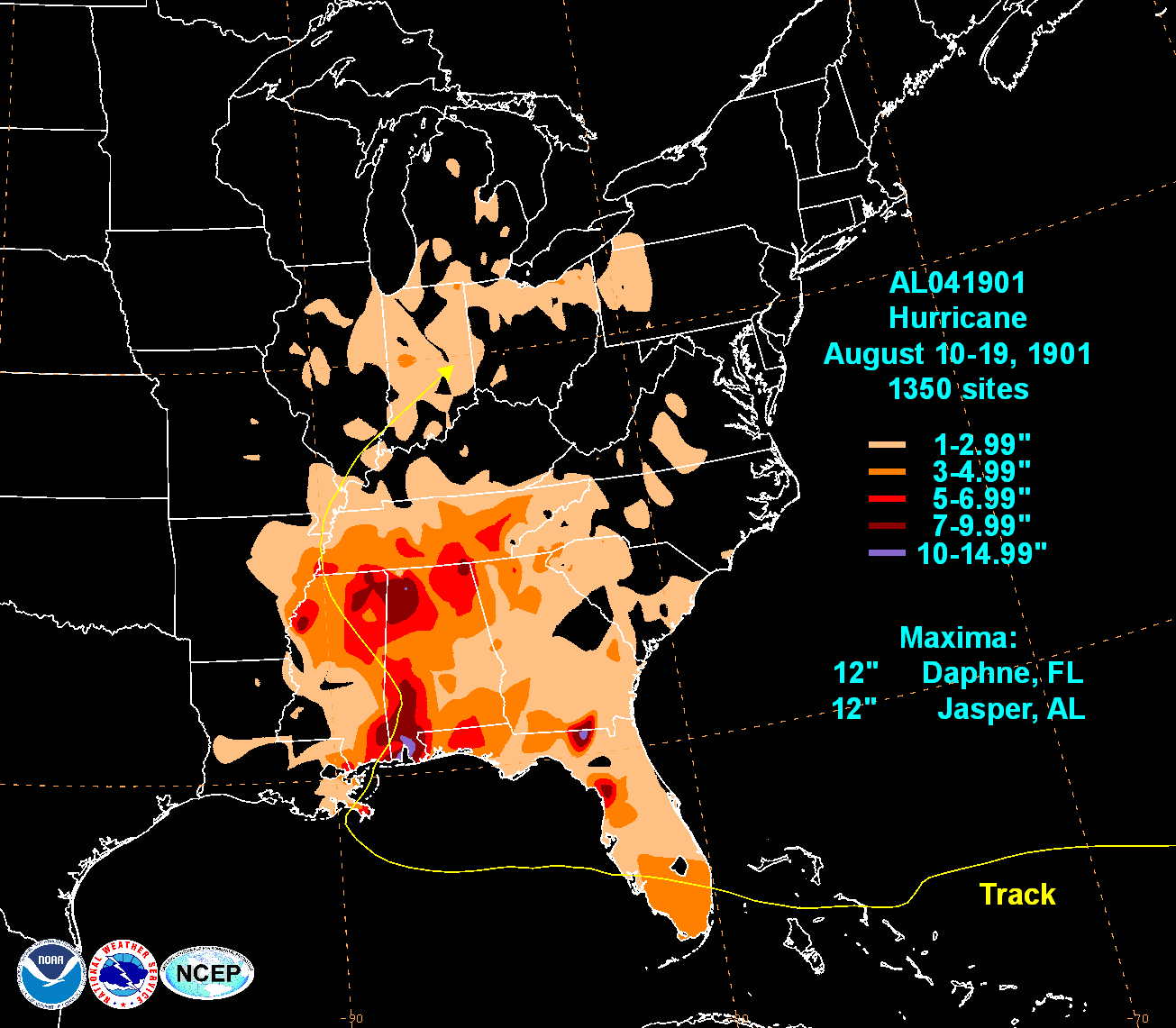
Map of the total rainfall from the hurricane

As the storm approached the east coast of Florida on August 10, a warning was sent to all Weather Bureau stations in Florida, as well as Savannah, Georgia, and Charleston, South Carolina, regarding a "disturbance of moderate intensity", which posed a threat to small crafts in Florida and the western Bahamas. The next day, as the storm was moving across Florida, another message sent to Weather Bureau stations from New Orleans to Charleston warned of the potential for severe squalls along the west coast of Florida. While approaching the Gulf Coast of the United States on August 13, storm warnings were ordered for Alabama, Mississippi and Louisiana, as well as for the west coast of Florida. At the National Weather Service office in New Orleans, hurricane warnings were ordered in Louisiana from mouth of the Mississippi River westward on August 15 and expanded to eastern Texas later that day. In New Orleans, 500 men, who were city authorities or levee board members, worked to strengthen the levees along canals in the city. Throughout much of the Gulf Coast of the United States, vessels and ships were warned to take precautions and remain in port.

In Florida, "considerable damage" due to strong winds was reported along portions of the east coast. Wind gusts reached 70 mph (110 km/h) in Pensacola. Offshore, the Portuguese bark Propheta, with a cargo of timber worth $5,000, was badly damaged. Strong winds up to 60 mph (97 km/h) were observed in the Mobile area of Alabama, uprooting trees, unroofing houses, and toppling chimneys. Tides inundated the cotton exchange with up to 18 inches (460 mm) of water, while the Western Union, post office, and electrical house for railroads were also flooded. The pleasure yacht Ariel, which was bound for the Fish River, was smashed into pieces at a wharf along the eastern end of Mobile Bay. Between 12 and 15 schooners from the F. F. Saunders company fishing fleet were badly damaged; four of which sank, resulting in $70,000 in damage. However, due to warnings by the Weather Bureau, the Chamber of Commerce estimated that several millions of dollars in damage was evaded. All towns along the coast of Mississippi "suffered seriously".

High winds and rough seas were observed in Louisiana. In Port Eads, five-minute sustained winds reached 56 mph (90 km/h), before the anemometer blew away. At the same location, a 24-hour rainfall record was set for the month of August, with 7.64 inches (194 mm) of precipitation observed. According to a contemporaneous report, the weather instrument shelter was swept away due to storm tides and the flag staff was broken. While the office building did weather the storm intact, documents in it were soaked. However, a report written in 2010 states that in Port Eads only the lighthouse remained standing in the aftermath of the devastation. Fifteen fatalities were reported after a house was swept away by storm tides. The 2010 report, however, states that a total of ten deaths were caused by the storm over its entire existence. In Pilottown, the large "lookout" tower was toppled and destroyed. The outhouse that displaymen used and slept in was blown over and then rapidly filled with water, due to tides rising to 4 feet (1.2 m) in only 10 minutes. Additionally, property of the Weather Bureau was also damaged.

Buras reported 4 feet (1.2 m) of water in town. River stages along the Mississippi River at New Orleans rose to a level of 7 feet (2.1 m) during the storm, producing much flooding. The Carondelet Canal also overflowed, inundating streets in the neighborhood of Tremé with 1 to 3 feet (0.30 to 0.91 m) of water. Levee breaks around New Orleans flooded the city. Additionally, strong winds littered the streets with tree branches. The worst hit areas of New Orleans were the neighborhoods of Bucktown, Milneburg, West End, all of which are located on the shore of Lake Pontchartrain. In the New Orleans suburb of Shell Beach, severe crop damage was reported, particularly to rice. While sailing the Mississippi River just outside New Orleans, Dr. J. N. Thomas reported that a schooner and a small boat were wrecked, resulting in 60 deaths. However, this was not confirmed. Overall, damage in Louisiana reached $1 million, which excluded losses to crops.

== See also ==
- Hurricane Isaac (2012) – another minimal hurricane which had a similar impact in Louisiana
- Hurricane Lili (1990) – another hurricane which formed in the central Atlantic and took an unusual southwestward track
