= Holly Ridge, North Carolina =

- Town
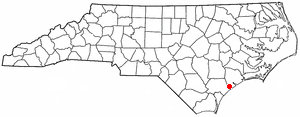
- Location of Holly Ridge, North Carolina
- Coordinates: 34°29′28″N 77°33′19″W
- Country: United States
- State: North Carolina
- County: Onslow

Area
  - Total: 4.23 sq mi (10.96 km^{2})
  - Land: 4.23 sq mi (10.95 km^{2})
  - Water: 0.0039 sq mi (0.01 km^{2})
- Elevation: 49 ft (15 m)

Population (2020)
  - Total: 4,171
  - Density: 986.7/sq mi (380.95/km^{2})
- Time zone: UTC-5 (Eastern (EST))
  - Summer (DST): UTC-4 (EDT)
- ZIP code: 28445
- Area codes: 910, 472
- FIPS code: 37-32180
- GNIS feature ID: 2405853
- Website: https://hollyridgenc.org/

Holly Ridge is a town in Onslow County, North Carolina, United States. The 2010 population was 1,268. The 2020 census population was 4,171.

== Economy ==
The town's largest employer is J&J Snack Foods. Industrial growth is strengthening with the growth of the Camp Davis Industrial Park which resides on the same land that Camp Davis had occupied. The industrial park's largest tenants are Gulfstream Steel and Onslow Bay Boatworks. Atlantic Seafood is planning a 63,000 square foot facility with construction slated to begin in 2021. Plans for developing an additional 60 acres (referred to Camp Davis Industrial Park Phase 2) is underway with hopes to have shovel ready lots available for purchase in 2023.

== Geography ==
According to the United States Census Bureau, the town has a total area of 1.4 square miles (3.6 km^{2}), all land. It is part of the Jacksonville, North Carolina Metropolitan Statistical Area. It is considered the gateway to Topsail Island.

== Demographics ==
In 1940, the town had 28 residents. Just three years later in 1943, the town had ballooned to 1,000 residents due to the establishing of the Camp Davis Army post.

Historical population
Census	Pop.	Note	%±
1950	1,082		—
1960	731		−32.4%
1970	415		−43.2%
1980	465		12.0%
1990	728		56.6%
2000	831		14.1%
2010	1,268		52.6%
2020	4,171		228.9%
2023 (est.)	5,170	▲	24.0%
U.S. Decennial Census

=== 2020 census ===
Holly Ridge racial composition
Race	Number	Percentage
White (non-Hispanic)	3,192	76.53%
Black or African American (non-Hispanic)	190	14.56%
Native American	17	0.41%
Asian	69	1.65%
Pacific Islander	13	0.31%
Other/Mixed	301	7.22%
Hispanic or Latino	389	9.33%

As of the 2020 census, Holly Ridge had a population of 4,171. The median age was 32.3 years. 24.4% of residents were under the age of 18 and 10.5% of residents were 65 years of age or older. For every 100 females, there were 102.1 males, and for every 100 females age 18 and over, there were 99.4 males age 18 and over.

0.0% of residents lived in urban areas, while 100.0% lived in rural areas.

There were 1,661 households in Holly Ridge, of which 36.1% had children under the age of 18 living in them. Of all households, 55.6% were married-couple households, 16.5% were households with a male householder and no spouse or partner present, and 20.1% were households with a female householder and no spouse or partner present. About 22.9% of all households were made up of individuals and 7.2% had someone living alone who was 65 years of age or older.

There were 2,205 housing units, of which 24.7% were vacant. The homeowner vacancy rate was 4.5% and the rental vacancy rate was 8.1%.

=== 2000 census ===
As of the census of 2000, there were 831 people, 321 households, and 226 families residing in the town. The population density was 604.9 inhabitants per square mile (233.6/km^{2}). There were 498 housing units at an average density of 362.5 per square mile (140.0/km^{2}). The racial makeup of the town was 79.78% White, 14.56% African American, 1.32% Native American, 0.60% Asian, 0.12% Pacific Islander, 2.53% from other races, and 1.08% from two or more races. Hispanic or Latino of any race were 3.85% of the population.

There were 321 households, out of which 37.4% had children under the age of 18 living with them, 42.4% were married couples living together, 22.7% had a female householder with no husband present, and 29.3% were non-families. 19.6% of all households were made up of individuals, and 9.0% had someone living alone who was 65 years of age or older. The average household size was 2.49 and the average family size was 2.87.

In the town, the population was spread out, with 27.6% under the age of 18, 10.1% from 18 to 24, 27.4% from 25 to 44, 20.6% from 45 to 64, and 14.3% who were 65 years of age or older. The median age was 33 years. For every 100 females, there were 86.3 males. For every 100 females age 18 and over, there were 78.1 males.

The median income for a household in the town was $25,573, and the median income for a family was $26,979. Males had a median income of $27,059 versus $21,000 for females. The per capita income for the town was $12,585. About 19.0% of families and 24.1% of the population were below the poverty line, including 35.1% of those under age 18 and 14.3% of those age 65 or over.

== Education ==
- Dixon Elementary School
- Dixon Middle School
- Dixon High School
- Coastal Elementary School
