= Piney Green, North Carolina =

- CDP
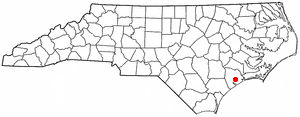
- Location of Piney Green, North Carolina
- Coordinates: 34°44′59″N 77°19′15″W
- Country: United States
- State: North Carolina
- County: Onslow

Area
  - Total: 13.72 sq mi (35.54 km^{2})
  - Land: 13.63 sq mi (35.30 km^{2})
  - Water: 0.093 sq mi (0.24 km^{2})
- Elevation: 3 ft (0.91 m)

Population (2020)
  - Total: 14,386
  - Density: 1,055.4/sq mi (407.48/km^{2})
- Time zone: UTC-5 (Eastern (EST))
  - Summer (DST): UTC-4 (EDT)
- FIPS code: 37-52260
- GNIS feature ID: 2403422

Piney Green is a census-designated place (CDP) in Onslow County, North Carolina, United States. The population was 14,386 at the 2020 census. It is part of the Jacksonville, NC Metropolitan Statistical Area.

== Geography ==
According to the United States Census Bureau, the CDP has a total area of 13.5 square miles (35 km^{2}), of which 13.4 square miles (35 km^{2}) is land and 0.1 square miles (0.26 km^{2}) (0.37%) is water.

== Demographics ==
Historical population
Census	Pop.	Note	%±
2020	14,386		—
U.S. Decennial Census

=== 2020 census ===
As of the 2020 census, Piney Green had a population of 14,386. The median age was 29.9 years. 27.4% of residents were under the age of 18 and 9.8% of residents were 65 years of age or older. For every 100 females there were 96.3 males, and for every 100 females age 18 and over there were 93.9 males age 18 and over. The census also counted 3,430 families.

90.2% of residents lived in urban areas, while 9.8% lived in rural areas.

There were 5,339 households in Piney Green, of which 38.1% had children under the age of 18 living in them. Of all households, 52.4% were married-couple households, 17.4% were households with a male householder and no spouse or partner present, and 23.8% were households with a female householder and no spouse or partner present. About 22.5% of all households were made up of individuals and 5.9% had someone living alone who was 65 years of age or older.

There were 6,127 housing units, of which 12.9% were vacant. The homeowner vacancy rate was 3.8% and the rental vacancy rate was 9.7%.

Piney Green racial composition
Race	Number	Percentage
White (non-Hispanic)	7,439	51.71%
Black or African American (non-Hispanic)	2,867	19.93%
Native American	65	0.45%
Asian	375	2.61%
Pacific Islander	47	0.33%
Other/Mixed	1,317	9.15%
Hispanic or Latino	2,276	15.82%

=== 2000 census ===
At the 2000 census, there were 148,658 people, 4,202 households, and 3,193 families residing in the CDP. The population density was 868.7 inhabitants per square mile (335.4/km^{2}). There were 4,671 housing units at an average density of 348.1 per square mile (134.4/km^{2}). The racial makeup of the CDP was 64.74% White, 24.56% African American, 0.75% Native American, 2.58% Asian, 0.25% Pacific Islander, 3.12% from other races, and 4.01% from two or more races. Hispanic or Latino of any race were 7.61% of the population.

There were 5,126 households, out of which 43.5% had children under the age of 18 living with them, 60.2% were married couples living together, 12.6% had a female householder with no husband present, and 24.0% were non-families. 17.8% of all households were made up of individuals, and 2.7% had someone living alone who was 65 years of age or older. The average household size was 2.77 and the average family size was 3.12.

In the CDP, the population was spread out, with 30.2% under the age of 18, 16.0% from 18 to 24, 33.6% from 25 to 44, 15.6% from 45 to 64, and 4.5% who were 65 years of age or older. The median age was 27 years. For every 100 females, there were 98.0 males. For every 100 females age 18 and over, there were 96.2 males.

The median income for a household in the CDP was $36,636, and the median income for a family was $40,117. Males had a median income of $27,994 versus $20,278 for females. The per capita income for the CDP was $15,353. About 7.3% of families and 10.5% of the population were below the poverty line, including 13.9% of those under age 18 and 15.4% of those age 65 or over.
