= Floating dock (jetty) =

Type of dock supported by pontoons

A floating dock, floating pier or floating jetty is a floating platform or structure within a body of water that is supported by pontoons and usually connected to the bank or shore via a gangway/linkspan. Such platforms are usually moored in place by vertical pillars that are embedded in the seafloor (referred to as pilings) or by anchored cables. Frequently used in marinas as docking piers, this type of platform can self-adjust to variations in water levels and maintain a constant relative vertical relationship to the watercraft secured to it (as both will float identically with the water surface), regardless of tidal, weather and discharge conditions, while the incline of the gangway/linkspan will vary with the water level.

== Braby pontoon ==
'Braby pontoon' was the name given to a type of floating dock used by flying boats in Australia and New Zealand from 1939 to the 1950s. Frederick Braby and Company was a British manufacturer of tanks and silos, Bailey bridges and pontoons. The Braby name was also attached to the general type of pontoon made with ship tanks, whether or not they were manufactured by Frederick Braby and Company. Two 1939 descriptions of a Braby pontoon in Auckland stated:

A new type of floating jetty will be used in Auckland for the berthing of the flying-boats. Mr. Turnill stated this morning that this type is known as the "Braby pontoon", and it has been used previously only at Southampton. It has been well tested there and has been found to be most satisfactory. It consists of two twin sections joined in an arc underneath the water.

and

Shaped like a U, the pontoon resembles a miniature floating dock, and consists of two parallel decks joined by a submerged framework. Tanks give the necessary buoyancy. When the flying-boat has landed, it is warped into position by the ground crew, and is drawn tail-first into the pontoon, coming to rest with the hull between the two sections of decking and above the submerged frame. Inflated buffers on the inner edge of the decking prevent the delicate hull from being damaged.

A Braby pontoon installed at Evans Bay in Wellington, New Zealand in 1951 consisted of 124 large square steel tanks connected together and ballasted with water and oil. The pontoon was U-shaped, 110 feet (34 m) long and 74 feet (23 m) wide. Flying boats were winched tail-first into the U so that passengers could step onto the pontoon dock.

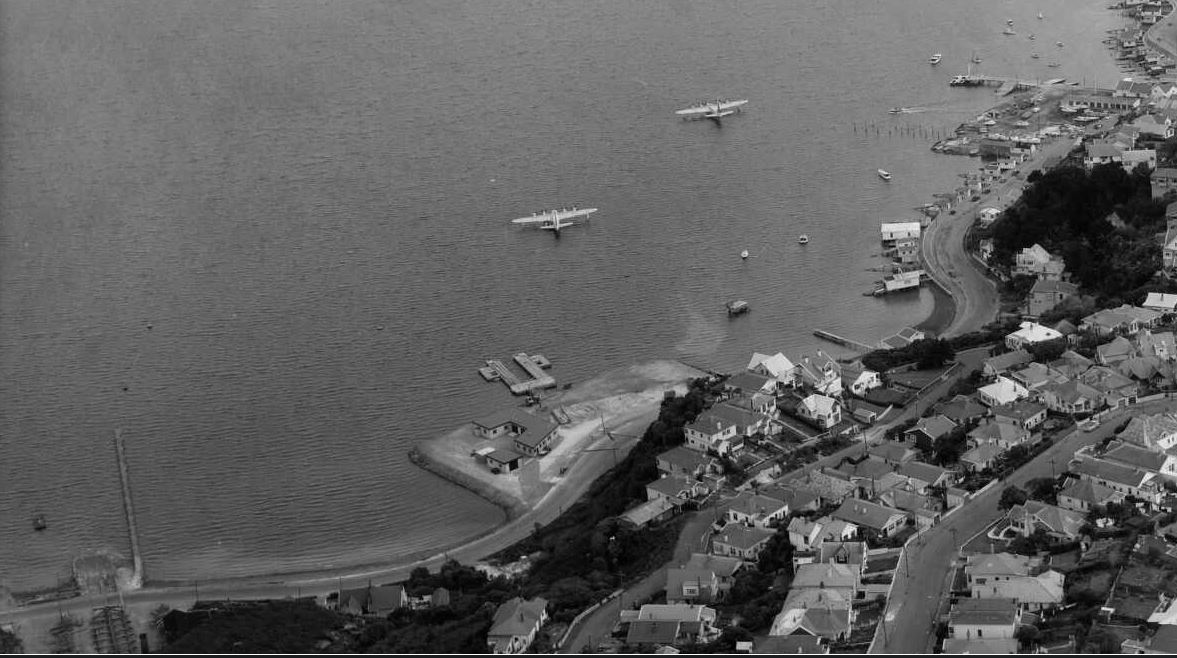
A Braby pontoon at Evans Bay, Wellington, New Zealand.

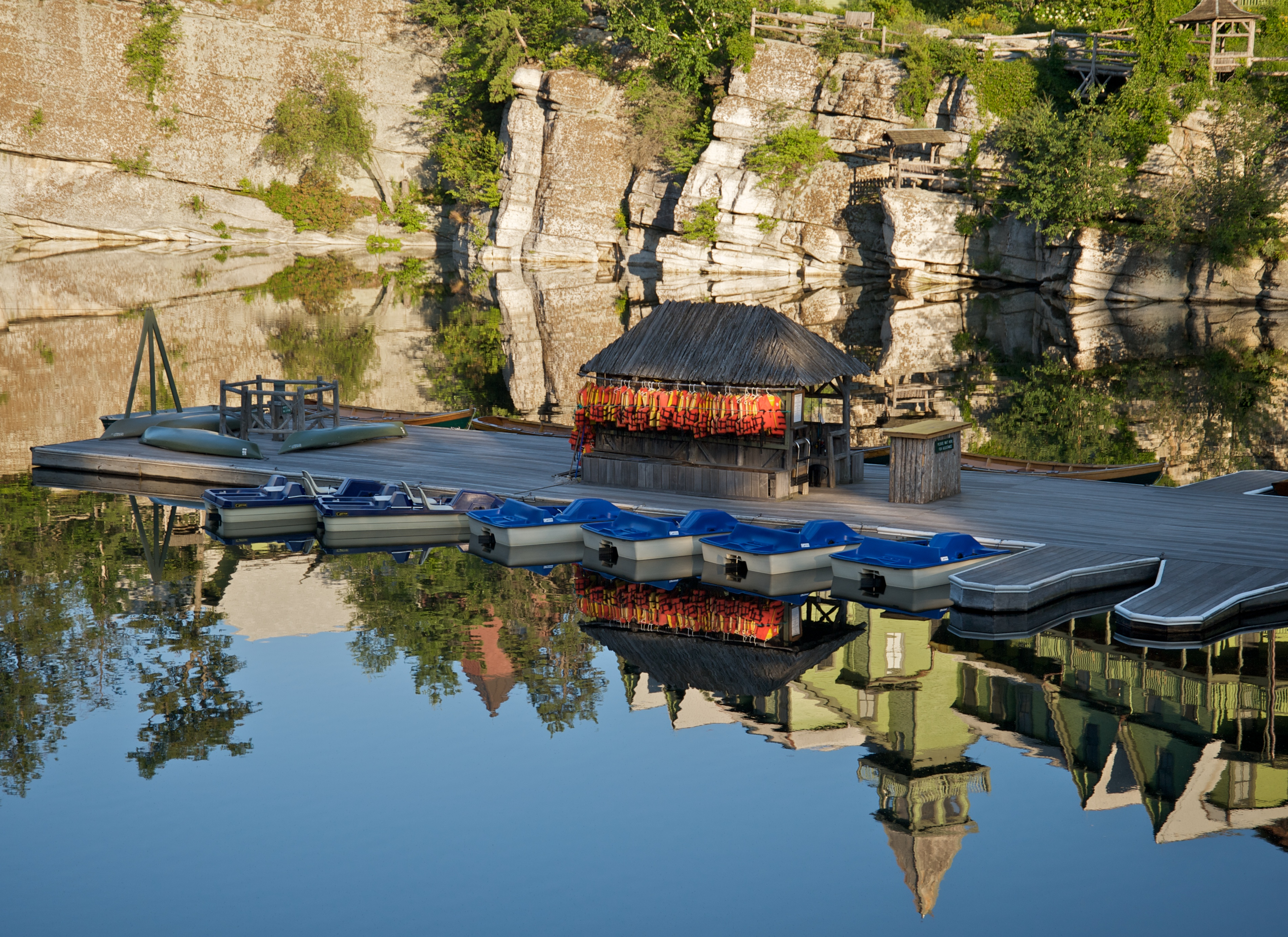
A floating dock at Mohonk Mountain House

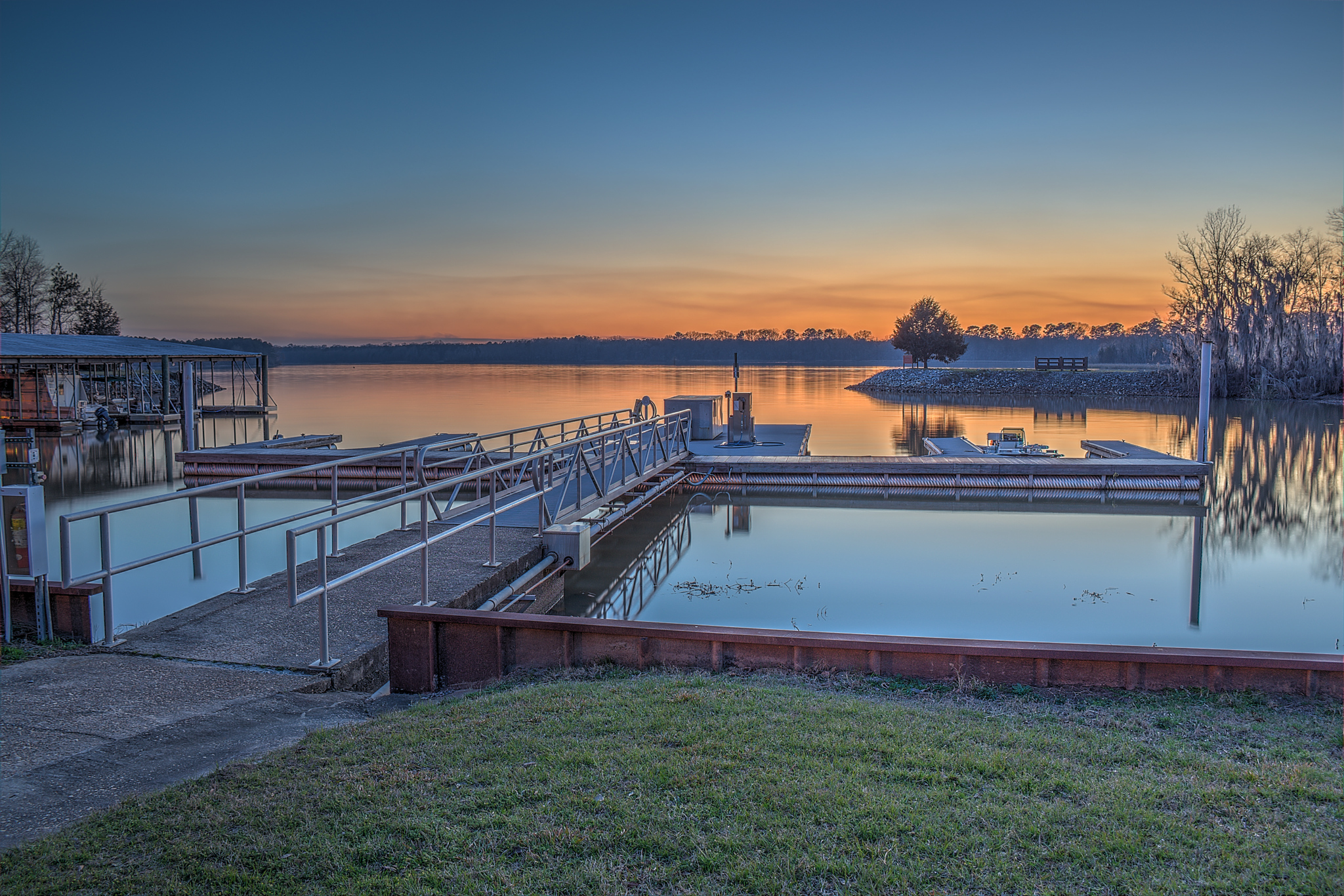
A floating dock at Florence Marina State Park

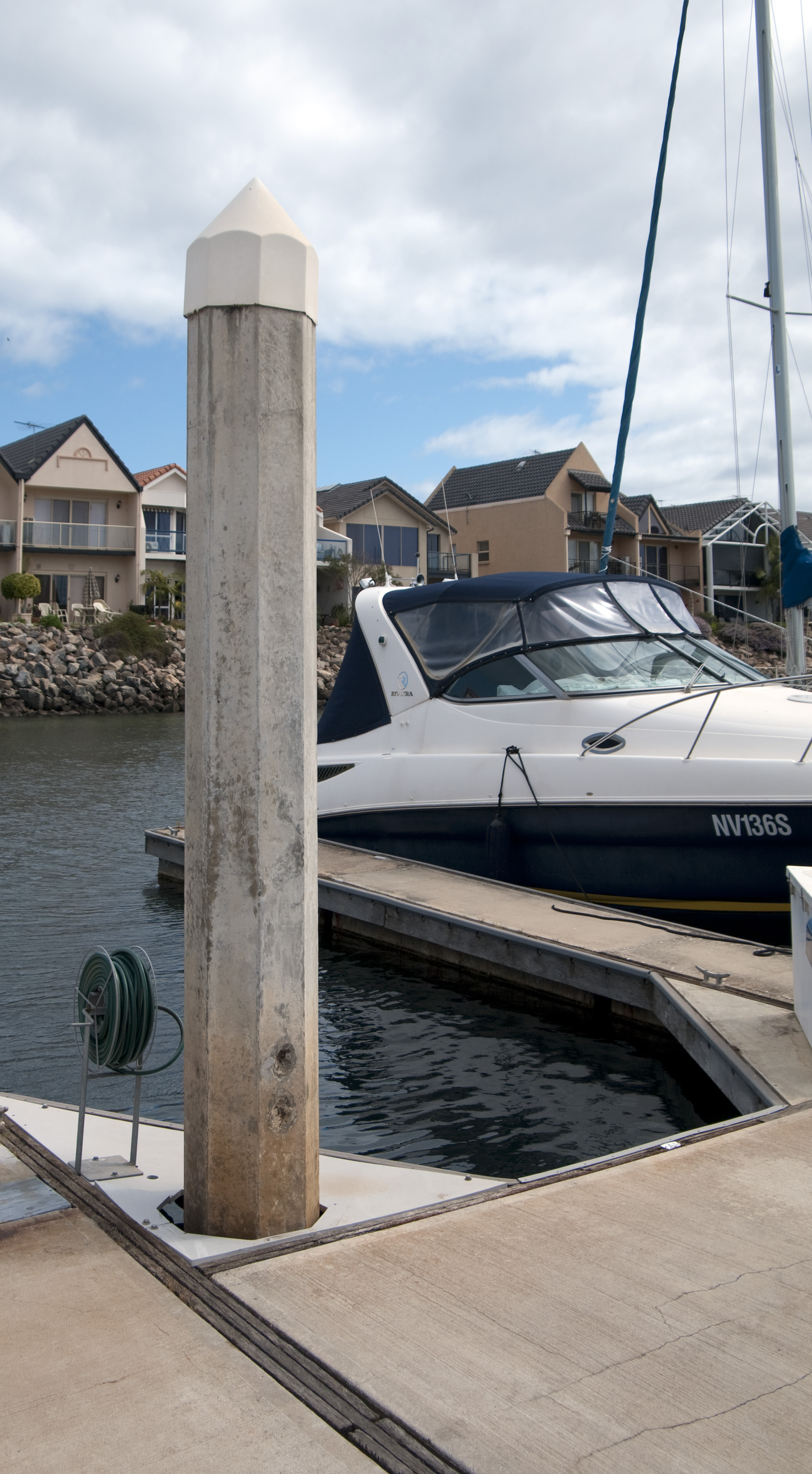
A floating dock at a private marina. The vertical "spud" only anchors the dock sections in place, and does not provide structural support for loads upon the dock.

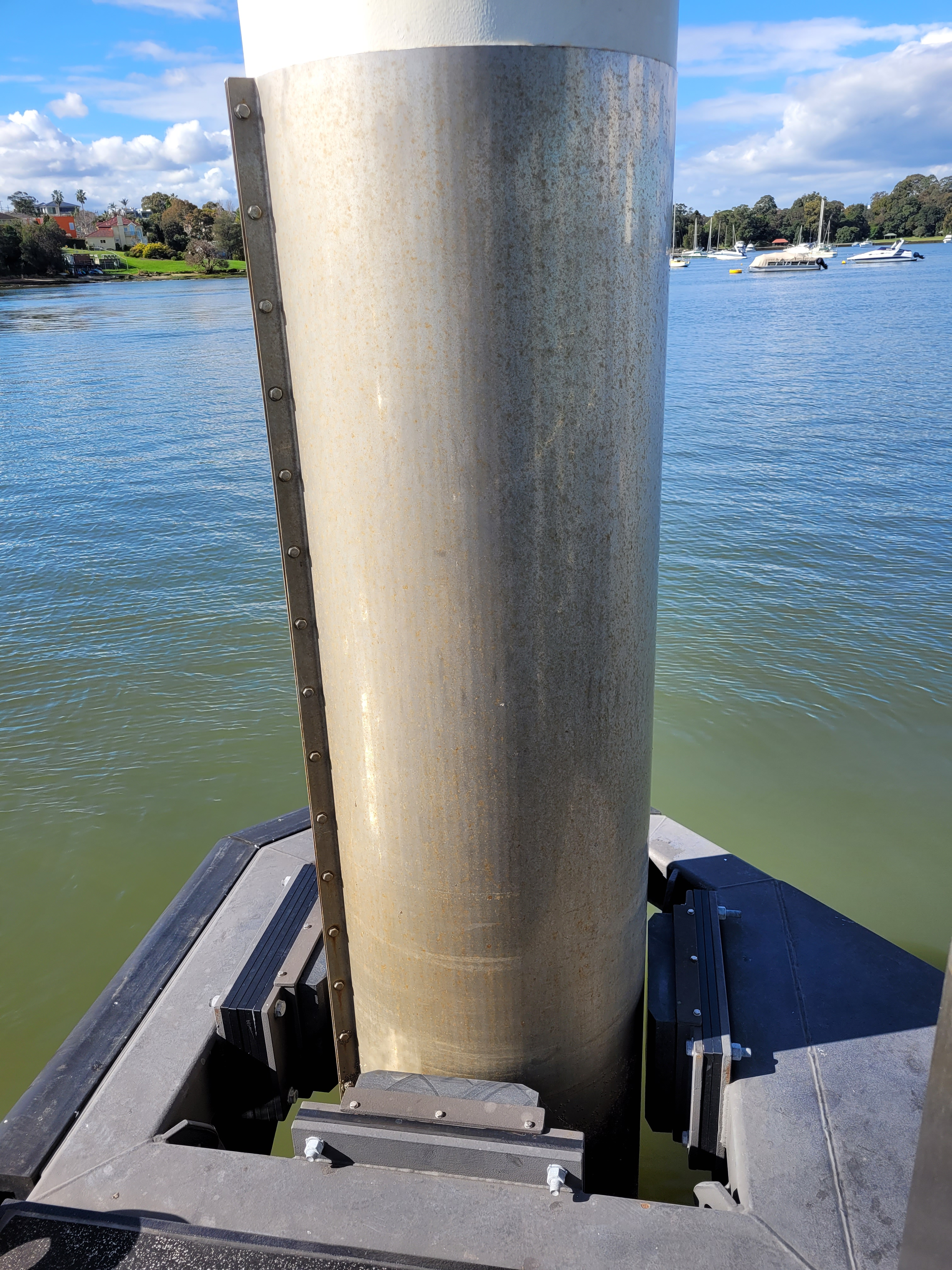
A pontoon in Sydney

== See also ==
- Gaza floating pier, a floating pier built during the Israel–Hamas war
- Floating dock (impounded), other types of floating docks
- Floating dry dock, other types of floating docks
