= LVTP-5 =

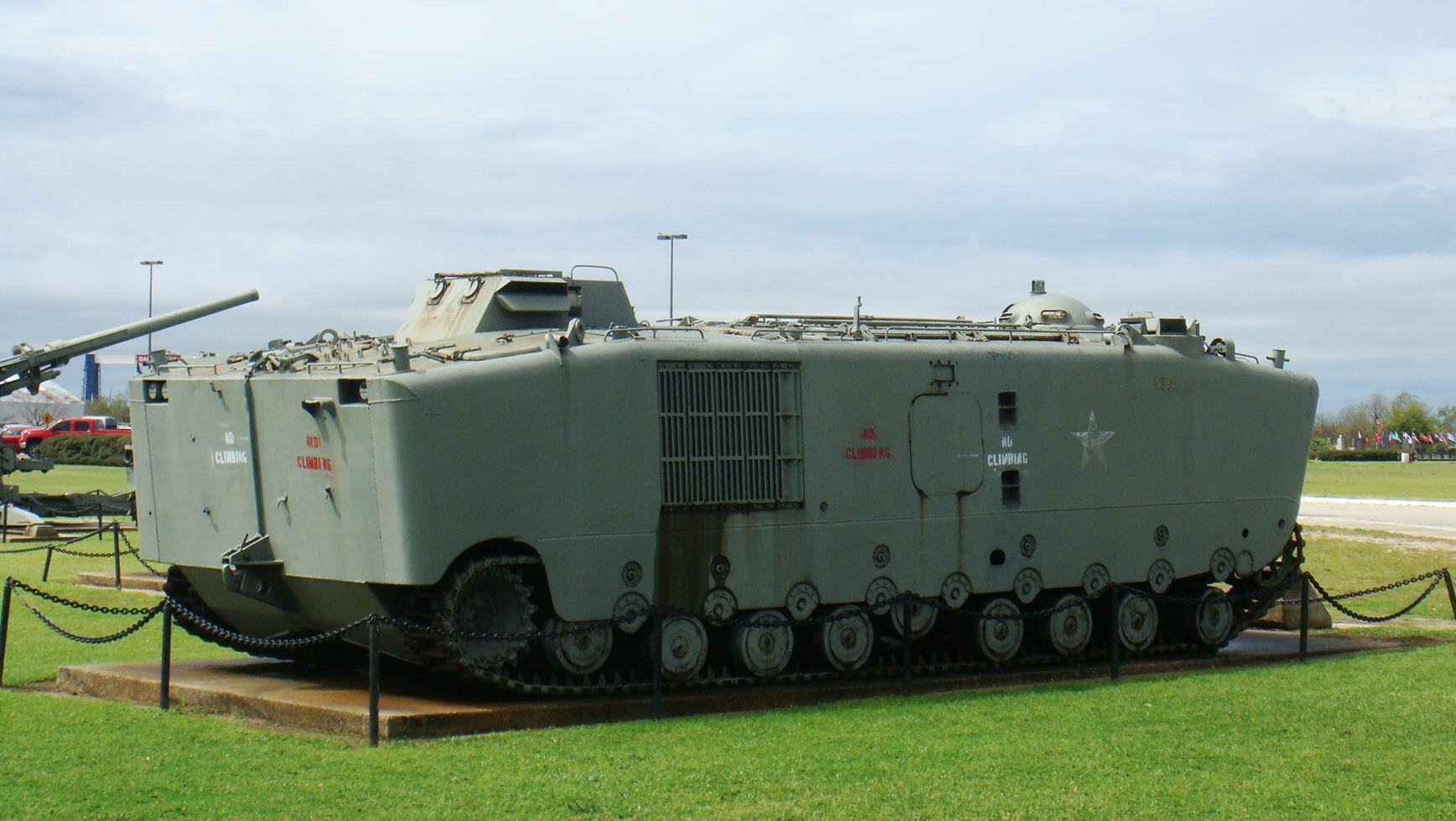
- An LVTP-5 on display at the USS Alabama (BB-60) memorial in Mobile, Alabama. The front of the vehicle is facing right in this picture.
- Type: Armored personnel carrier
- Place of origin: United States

Service history
- In service: 1956–2025
- Used by: See Operators
- Wars: Vietnam War; 1989 Philippine coup attempt

Specifications
- Mass: 37.4 t
- Length: 9.04 m (29 ft 8 in)
- Width: 3.57 m (11 ft 9 in)
- Height: 2.92 m (9 ft 7 in)
- Crew: 3+34 passengers
- Armor: 6-16 mm
- Main armament: .30 caliber machinegun 105mm howitzer (LVTP-6)
- Engine: Continental LV-1790-1 V-12 gasoline 704 hp (525 kW)
- Power/weight: 19 hp/tonne
- Suspension: Torsilastic
- Operational range: 306 km (190 mi) road, 92 km (57 mi) water
- Maximum speed: 48 km/h (30 mph), in water 11 km/h (6.8 mph)

The LVTP-5 (landing vehicle, tracked, personnel 5) is a family of amphibious armored fighting vehicles used by the Philippine Marine Corps, the Republic of China Marine Corps, and, formerly, the United States Marine Corps. It was designed by the BorgWarner company and built by FMC (Food Machinery Corporation) along with a few other companies. It was first accepted into service in 1956. Some 1,124 basic units were produced, plus the specialist variants, and many saw action in the Vietnam War. It was succeeded by the Assault Amphibious Vehicle.

== History ==
The LVTP-5 was an evolution of the LVT-1 to LVT-4 World War II-era landing vehicle tracked series, but was considerably larger and could carry 30-34 combat-armed troops. A smaller design based on the M59 APC was also produced as the LVT-6, but only a few were built.

The LVTP-5 was replaced in service by the LVT-7 family.

The most common type was the LVTP-5, an armored personnel carrier, with mine-sweeper, command, recovery and fire support variants, the latter mounted a 105 mm howitzer. An anti-aircraft version was prototyped, but never saw service.

As of the mid-2010s, the sole remaining state user of the LVTH-6 was the Philippines, who used four of them for their naval infantry force. As of 2013, Philippine LVTH-6s came in a "digital"-style camouflage pattern.

== Variants ==
- LVTP-5 (landing vehicle tracked, personnel) - armored personnel carrier
- LVTC-5 (landing vehicle, tracked, command) - command vehicle
- LVTH-6 (landing vehicle, tracked, howitzer) - fire support variant armed with M49 105 mm howitzer. Two hundred and ten units built.
- LVTR-1 (landing vehicle, tracked, recovery) - recovery vehicle. Sixty-five units built.
- LVTE-1 (landing vehicle, tracked, engineer) - mine-sweeper. Forty-one units built.
- LVTAA-X1 (landing vehicle, tracked, anti aircraft) - anti-aircraft variant, to be fitted with the turret of the M42 Duster. Only prototype built.

== Operators ==
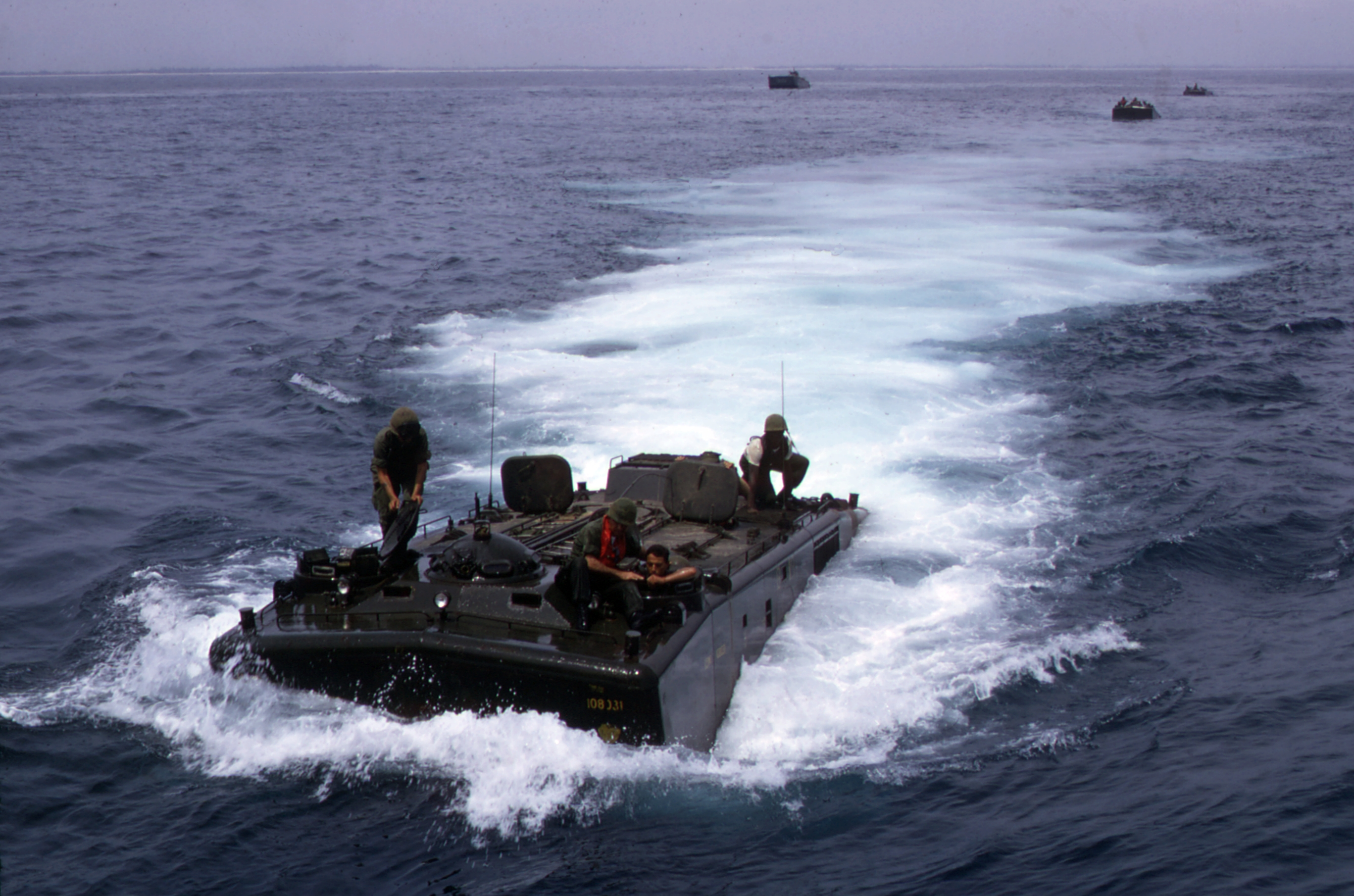
USMC LVTP-5s during a training exercise in 1968.

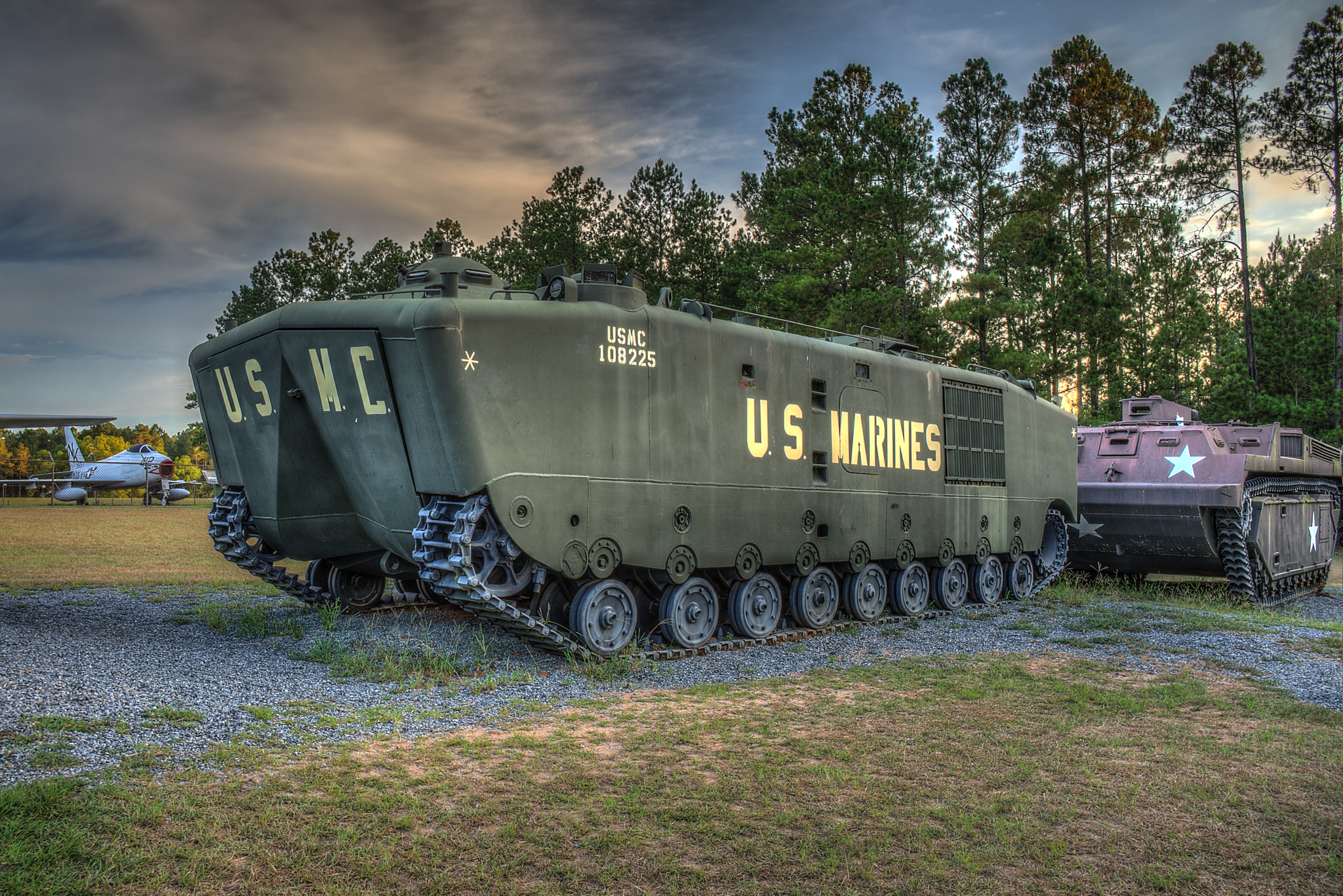
An LVTP-5 on display at Georgia Veterans State Park.

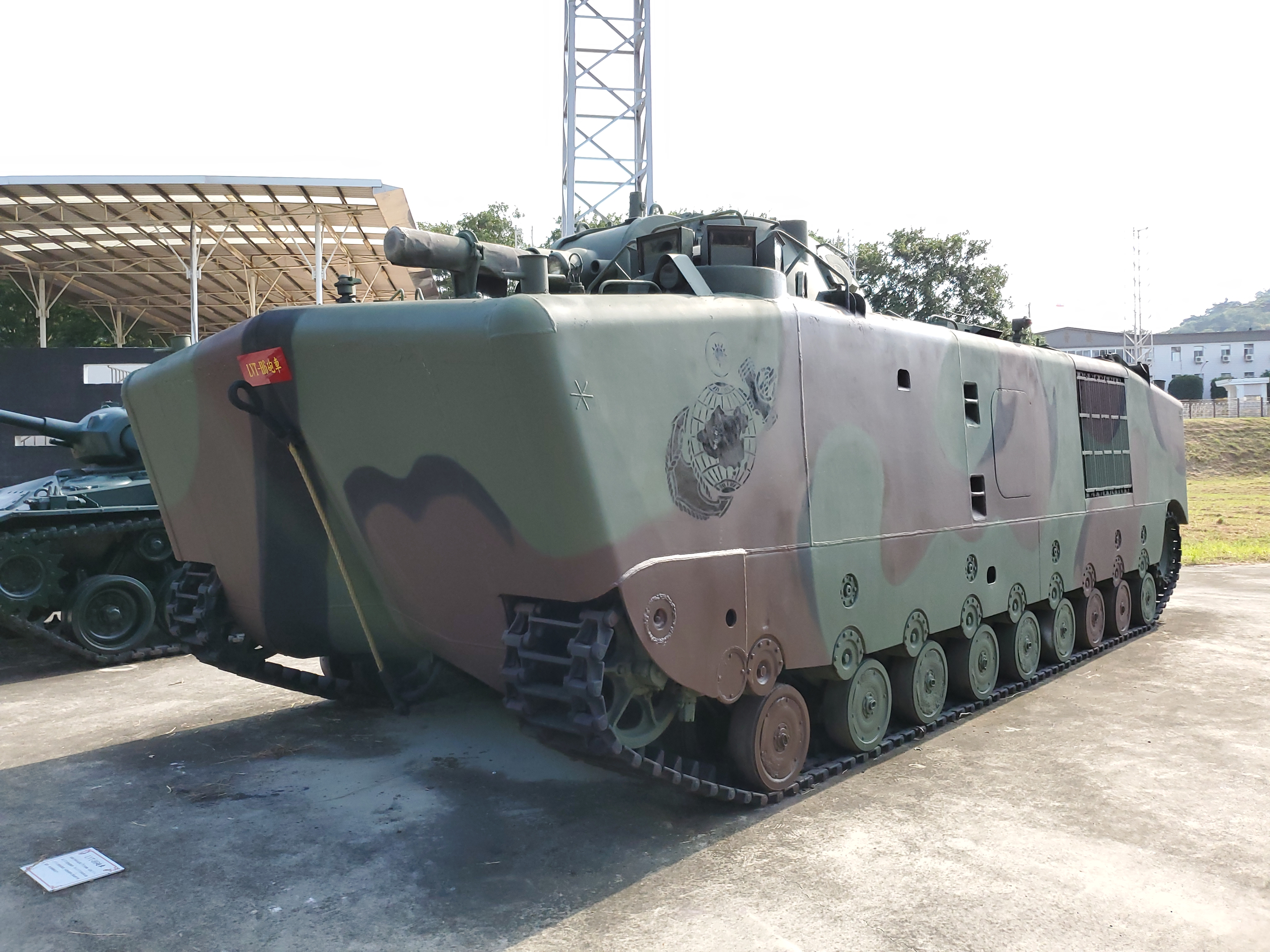
LVTH-6 in the Museum of Republic of China Marine Corps.

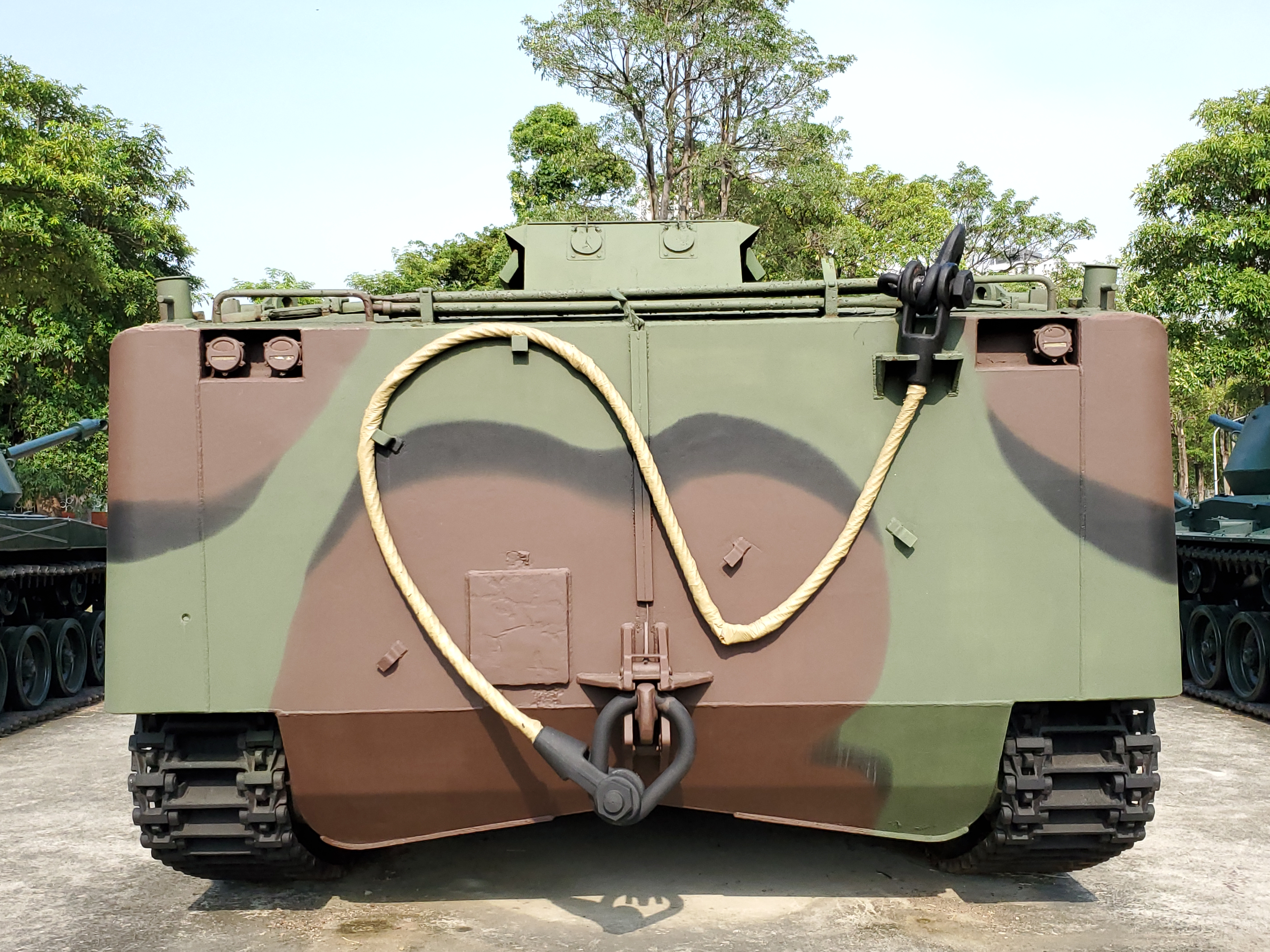
LVTH-6 rear view.

Former

- Chile
- Philippines
  - Philippine Marine Corps – 50 purchased in 1975. Four remaining LVTH-6 were decommissioned and delisted from inventory in 2019.
- Taiwan
  - Republic of China Marine Corps – The last LVTH-6 was retired in 2025.
- United States
- South Vietnam

== Vehicles on display ==
=== Philippines ===
LVTP-5

- LVTP-5 Vehicle retired and is on Display at Military Park Luuk, Sulu.

LVTH-6

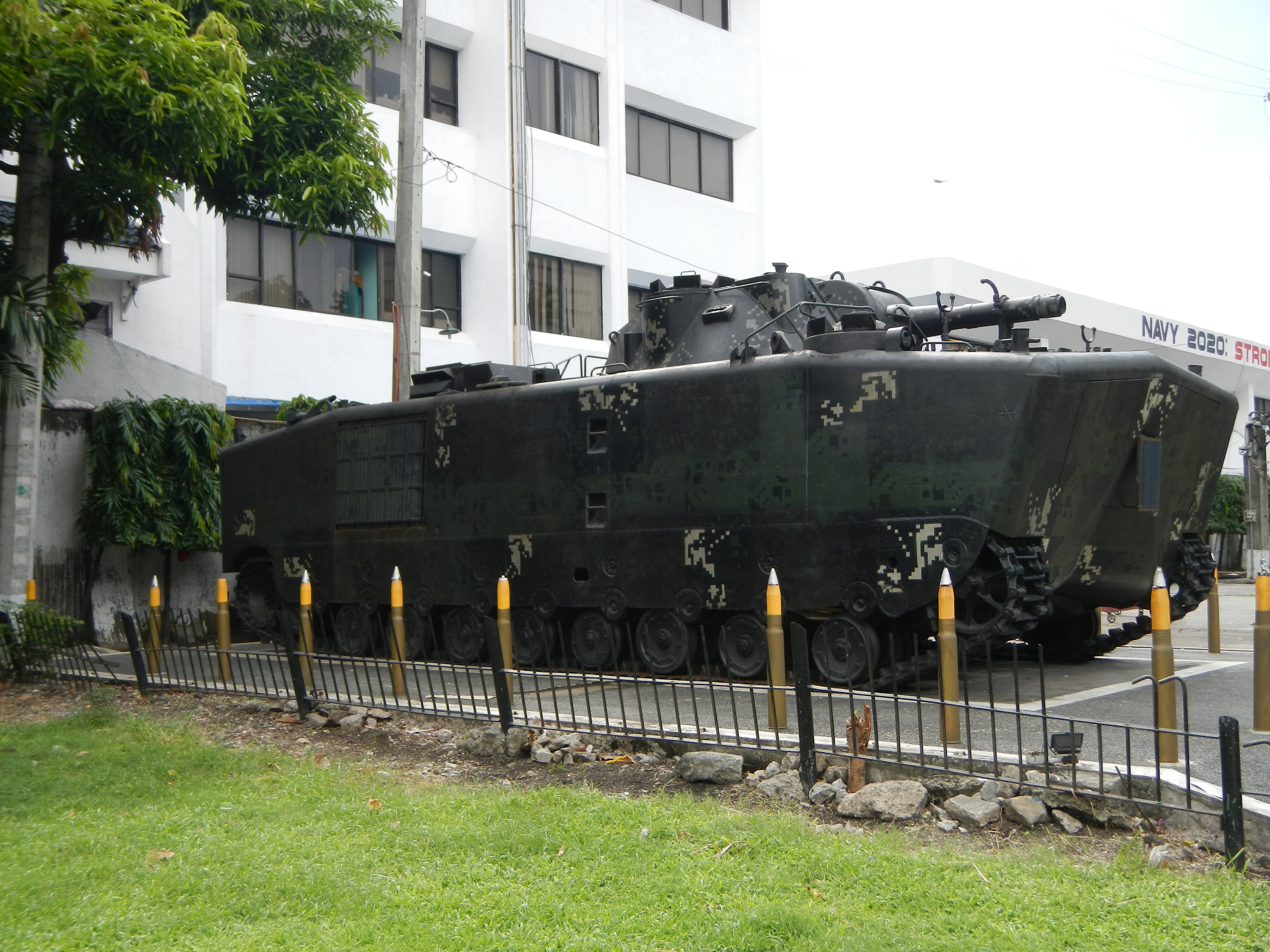
LVTjf0091 03

- LVTH-6 Vehicle retired and is on Display at Camp Bojeador, Burgos, Ilocos Norte, Philippines.
- LVTH-6 Vehicle retired and is on Display at Naval Station Jose Andrada, City of Manila
- LVTH-6 Vehicle retired and is on Display at Armed Forces of the Philippines Veterans Center. Camp Aguinaldo, Quezon City, National Capital Region.
- LVTH-6 Vehicle retired and is on Display at Philippine Navy Museum, Fort San Felipe, Cavite City, Cavite, Philippines

LVTE-1

- LVTE-1 Vehicle retired and is on Display at Camp Bojeador, Burgos, Ilocos Norte, Philippines.

=== Taiwan ===
LVTP-5

- An LVTP-5 is on display in Fenglin Citizen Square, Fenglin Township, Hualien County.

LVTH-6

- LVTH-6 in the Museum of Republic of China Marine Corps.

=== United States ===
LVTP-5

- An LVTP-5 formerly of the United States Marine Corps is on display at Georgia Veterans State Park.
- An LVTP-5 on display at the USS Alabama (BB-60) memorial in Mobile, Alabama.
- Two LVTP-5s are on display at Courthouse Bay on Camp Lejeune, North Carolina
- An LVTP-5 on display at Estrella Warbird Museum, Paso Robles, California.
- An LVTP-5 on display at VFW Post 6378 in Dickinson, Texas.
- AN LVTP-5 on display at United States Marine Corps reserve base on display on Tampa Bay Causeway, Tampa, Florida

LVTH-6

- An LVTH-6 formerly of the United States Marine Corps is on display at Mott's Military Museum in Groveport, Ohio.

== See also ==
- G-numbers
