= Semper Fi: Always Faithful =

- Promotional poster photo of Jerry Ensminger graduation day from Drill Instructor School, 19 December 1975 Parris Island, S. C.
- Directed by: Tony Hardmon and Rachel Libert
- Produced by: Jedd Wider, and Todd Wider
- Starring: Jerry Ensminger, Master Sergeant USMC (retired), Tom Townsend, Major USMC (retired), Mike Partain, Denita McCall (deceased)
- Edited by: Purcell Carson
- Production company: Wider Film Projects
- Distributed by: MSNBC
- Release date: April 21, 2011 (Tribeca Film Festival)
- Running time: 76 minutes
- Country: United States
- Language: English

Semper Fi: Always Faithful, is a documentary film about the Camp Lejeune water contamination. The film made the 15 film short list for consideration for a 2012 Academy Award for best documentary feature. The film, which debuted at the Tribeca Film Festival in April 2011, has a 100% "fresh" rating on review aggregator website Rotten Tomatoes, indicating highly positive critical reviews. The film won a documentary editing award at Tribeca and The Ridenhour Documentary Film Prize 2012. The Society of Professional Journalists presented it with its Sigma Delta Chi Award for Best Television Documentary (Network).

== Synopsis ==
German American Jerry Ensminger was a devoted Marine Corps Master Sgt. for nearly twenty-five years. As a drill instructor he lived and breathed the "Corps" and was responsible for indoctrinating thousands of new recruits with its motto Semper Fidelis or "Always Faithful." When Jerry's nine-year-old daughter Janey died of a rare type of leukemia, his world collapsed. As a grief-stricken father, he struggled for years to make sense of what happened. His search for answers led to the shocking discovery of a Marine Corps cover-up of one of the largest water contamination incidents in U.S. history. Semper Fi: Always Faithful follows Jerry's mission to expose the Marine Corps and force them to live up to their motto to the thousands of Marines and their families exposed to toxic chemicals. His fight reveals a grave injustice at North Carolina's Camp Lejeune and a looming environmental crisis at military sites across the country.

== Accolades ==
Semper Fi: Always Faithful has won/nominated the following awards:

- Nomination for News & Documentary Emmy Awards (2013)
- Won Best Editing for the Tribeca Film Festival (2011)
- Won Best Documentary for United Nations Association Film Festival (2012)
- Woodstock Film Festival (2011)
  - Won Audience Award
  - Won Jury Prize
  - Runners Up for Best Editing
- San Diego Film Festival (2011)
  - Won Best Documentary
