= Murder of Maria Lauterbach =

2007 murder

Maria Frances Lauterbach
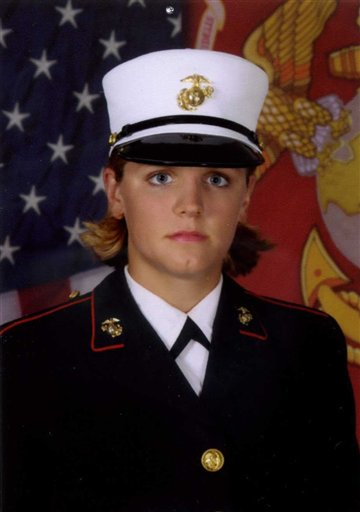
- Lauterbach, c. 2006
- Born: November 17, 1987; Dayton, Ohio, US
- Died: December 14, 2007 (aged 20); Jacksonville, North Carolina, US
- Military career
- Allegiance: United States
- Branch: United States Marine Corps
- Rank: Lance Corporal
- Unit: 2nd Marine Logistics Group

Lance Corporal Maria Frances Lauterbach (November 17, 1987 – December 14, 2007) of Vandalia, Ohio, was a United States Marine who disappeared from Marine Corps Base Camp Lejeune, North Carolina, on December 14, 2007. At the time of her disappearance, Lauterbach was eight months pregnant. Authorities found the remains of Lauterbach and her unborn child in the backyard of Corporal Cesar Armando Laurean, who was extradited from Mexico in 2009 and convicted of murder in 2010.

The murder prompted Congress to order the Defense Department to make several changes in the way it handles sexual assaults in the ranks.

== Maria Lauterbach ==
Lauterbach grew up in Vandalia, Ohio, where she attended Butler High School. Lauterbach joined the Marines on June 6, 2006. She was a personnel clerk assigned to Combat Logistics Regiment 27, 2nd Marine Logistics Group, II Marine Expeditionary Force.

== Background and death ==
According to her mother, Mary Lauterbach, LCpl. Lauterbach was preparing to testify that she was raped by a fellow Marine. Mary Lauterbach told police that her daughter "claimed she had been raped by a senior Marine at her command, and that the investigation had gone sour." Her father, Victor Lauterbach, had explained that Maria, an adoptive child, had long been troubled. "It all comes from fetal alcohol or fetal drug-use syndromes. Although our adoption agency claimed the child's background was satisfactory, we never met the mother. Maria's history was one of constant trouble—calls from the principals at her schools, arguments at sports activities, and a disrespectful attitude. We felt that enlisting in the Marines would be a turnaround for her, but it was a continuation of a problematic life." Her mother reported her missing on December 19, 2007, five days after their last conversation. Her cellphone was found on December 20, near the main gate at Camp Lejeune.

Authorities found the burned remains of Lauterbach and her unborn child in a fire pit in the backyard of Corporal Cesar Armando Laurean. They also found a large quantity of her blood in Laurean's house in Jacksonville, North Carolina. Laurean was reported as having tried to clean up the scene.

During a press conference on January 11, 2008, Onslow County Sheriff Ed Brown reported the death of Lauterbach. Brown stated that authorities "had gotten physical evidence of the woman's death that also linked Laurean to the death." Laurean claims in a note found by his wife that Lauterbach committed suicide by cutting her own throat during an argument at the Laurean home. However, authorities found evidence that pointed to murder in the initial investigation, which was further supported by the autopsy results released in March 2008, which classified the neck wound as post-mortem and insufficient to cause death. The official cause of death was blunt force trauma to the head.

== Cesar Laurean ==
Cesar Armando Laurean
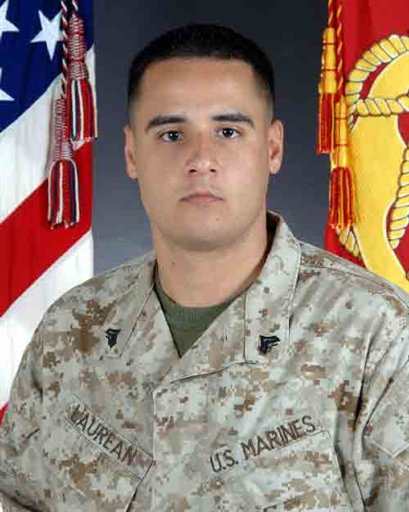
- Born: November 13, 1986 (age 39); Mexico

Marine Corporal Cesar Laurean (SEH'-sahr LOHR'-ee-uhn), the 21-year-old prime suspect in the case, is the man whom Lauterbach accused of sexually assaulting her. A federal warrant for unlawful flight to avoid prosecution was issued for his arrest on January 12, 2008. The Federal Bureau of Investigation and the Naval Criminal Investigative Service issued a wanted flier on him. There was also a $25,000 reward offered by the FBI and $5,000 from the state of North Carolina for information leading to his capture. Onslow County has primary jurisdiction, but the Judge Advocate General's office may bring charges as well, to include but not limited to charges stemming from Laurean's deserter status.

Shortly after the murder, the press reported that Laurean fled to Mexico, his country of birth. Mexican officials issued an arrest warrant for Laurean as a suspect in the killing of his pregnant colleague, a U.S. Embassy official said on January 29 in Mexico City. Interpol also issued an international wanted notice for Laurean. A cousin of the corporal informed reporters that Laurean visited family in the area of Guadalajara, Mexico, in late January 2008, but left without saying where he was going. America's Most Wanted featured this story on its April 5, 2008, episode.

On April 10, 2008, the FBI announced that Laurean had been apprehended in Tacámbaro, Michoacán, Mexico. The popular press indicated that his extradition might involve at least two years of legal proceedings, considering the relationship between the United States and Mexico. In September 2008, Onslow County District Attorney Dewey Hudson agreed not to seek the death penalty, and a Mexican judge agreed to extradite Laurean.

However, in October 2008, Laurean launched another appeal to the Mexican courts to prevent his extradition, arguing that North Carolina's life-without-parole sentence for first-degree murder is not only barred under the countries' extradition treaty but is considered cruel and unusual punishment. (In North Carolina, a person convicted of first-degree murder can only be sentenced to death or life without parole.) On April 17, 2009, the FBI announced that Laurean had been extradited to the United States and was being held in the Onslow County jail. In December, an Onslow County judge agreed that the trial should be moved to a different county due to the extensive media coverage on the case, and scheduled it to begin on June 28, 2010. In January 2010, Wayne County was selected.

As concern grew through December 2007, Maria's mother, Mary Lauterbach, made frequent appeals for adequate investigation by the Marines. Her advocacy grew until she and congressional representatives, such as Rep. Tony Hall, became associated with the cause of safety from sexual predators in the military. Her father Victor was mostly absent from family appearances during the disappearance of and search for Maria. For the most part, the absence was explained as avoiding the observation that the parents' insistence was a conflict of interest with Victor Lauterbach's position in the Ohio National Guard as a Senior Master Sergeant in the U.S. Air Force Reserves. In 2009, Mary Lauterbach filed a wrongful death lawsuit against Laurean and his wife Christina, accusing them of conspiring to conceal the murder.

On August 24, 2010, Laurean was convicted of murder, as well as theft and fraud charges relating to using Lauterbach's ATM card after the murder, and sentenced to life in prison. The jurors dismissed the defense's theory that Christina was in fact the real murderer, favoring the prosecution's argument that Laurean's desperation to save his career led to the incident. He initially conspired with Lauterbach to run to Mexico, supposedly with the intent of destroying her credibility with the desertion and continuing his career in the Corps, but reverted to killing her with a crowbar when that failed.

== See also ==
- Violence against women
- Women in the Military
