= Camp Lejeune incident =

1969 racial conflict

The Camp Lejeune incident refers to the outbreak of hostilities between black and white enlisted Marines at an NCO Club near the United States Marine Corps's Camp Lejeune in North Carolina, on the evening of July 20, 1969. It left a total of 15 Marines injured, and one, Corporal Edward E. Blankston, dead. It was subsequently investigated by the military and led to widespread changes in military race relations and policy.

== Circumstances ==
After the 1968 assassination of Martin Luther King Jr., who had opposed the Vietnam War and the use of Black people in the conflict, a series of race riots swept dozens of American cities and racial tensions were heightened throughout American society.

In 1969, the U.S. troop presence in Vietnam reached its peak of 549,000, and Black people often made up a disproportionate 25% or more of combat units in Vietnam, while constituting only 12% of the military. 20% of black males were combat soldiers, sailors, airmen and marines, while the percentage of Whites in combat roles was lower.

Camp Lejeune's racial make up in 1969 was 14% black. However, the number in certain combat infantry battalions was over 25%. Most Black Marines came from poor, rural communities from Louisiana, Mississippi, Alabama, Georgia, and South Carolina. Most white Marines were recruited from similarly underprivileged and rural communities from Tennessee, Kentucky, Oklahoma, Missouri, West Virginia, Indiana, Illinois, and Texas.

== Sequence of events ==
On the night of July 20th, 1969, several units of the 2nd Marine Division were celebrating at an NCO Club prior to their deployment to the Sixth Fleet in Spain. Ironically, it was the same night that Neil Armstrong first set foot on the moon. Many of us at Camp Lejeune that night were so involved with the moon landing that we didn't hear about the riots until later. By 9 p.m. there were approximately 150 black Marines along with 100 white Marines in the clubroom. Minor incidents that night had created a feeling of tension between blacks and whites, particularly when a black male Marine attempted to cut into a white male Marine dancing with a black female Marine. At one point, the club manager called the regimental commander to warn of the increasing tensions but no action was taken. At about 10:30 p.m., when Marines began leaving the clubroom, a white enlisted man burst into the room "extremely bloody" and exclaimed loudly that he had been assaulted by a group of black Marines. From then on until 11 p.m., fights broke out around the area which left 15 Marines injured and one, Corporal Edward E. Blankston, a three time wounded Vietnam veteran, dead of massive head injuries.

— Robert Stillman II

== Aftermath and official report ==
One black marine, a decorated veteran of Vietnam, who was branded a "militant", or troublemaker, on the base, told a newsman that he had grown tired of trying to make it in the Corps and being thwarted by discriminatory practices. "You get tired of trying behind that action," he said. "One day Chuck [white people] gets down wrong and you try to take that beast's head off."

— The New York Times, August 17, 1969

An investigation conducted by Col. Louis S. Holler for the military after the incident indicated that the source of the incident stemmed from "a general lack of compliance on the part of officers and noncommissioned officers with the existing policies, either by intent, in spirit, or through ignorance", that "many white officers and noncommissioned officers retain prejudices and deliberately practice them" and that "the Marine Corps, are returning Marines, both black and white, to civilian society with more deeply seated prejudices than were individually possessed upon entrance to service." In response to this and other racial incidents, the military made "a "concerted effort to encourage opportunities for cultural diversity and racial pride amongst minority groups.
