= Camp Lejeune water contamination =

Water contamination problem in the US

The Camp Lejeune water contamination problem occurred at Marine Corps Base Camp Lejeune in Jacksonville, North Carolina, from 1953 to 1987. During that time, United States Marine Corps (USMC) personnel and families at the base — as well as many international, particularly British, assignees — bathed in and ingested tap water contaminated with harmful chemicals at all concentrations from 240 to 3,400 times current safe levels. An undetermined number of former residents later developed cancer or other ailments including amyotrophic lateral sclerosis (ALS), fatty liver diseases, infertility, and Parkinson's disease, which could be due to the contaminated drinking water. Victims claim that USMC leaders concealed knowledge of the problem and did not act properly to resolve it or notify former residents.

In 2009 the U.S. federal government initiated investigations into the allegations of contaminated water and failures by U.S. Marine officials to act on the issue. In August 2012, President Obama signed the Janey Ensminger Act into law to begin providing medical care for people who may have been affected by the contamination. In February 2014, the Centers for Disease Control and Prevention found that the contaminated water at Camp Lejeune significantly increased the risk of possibly contracting multiple diseases, though they did not say that the water actually caused any disease. The PACT Act of 2022, Sec. 804, is the Camp Lejeune Justice Act of 2022. It provides damages for past injuries from Camp Lejeune toxic exposure. It is the first such law that provides compensation to the civilian family members of veterans stationed at the base as well as those who came onto the base for work.

== Contamination ==
=== Early reports ===
From August 1, 1953 through December 31, 1987 (sometimes from January 1, 1950 through December 31, 1985), Marines and personnel of any branch of the armed forces and their families stationed at Camp Lejeune's main base, barracks, family, temporary housing, Tarawa Terrace and Hadnot Point may have consumed or bathed in water contaminated with hazardous chemicals at concentrations from 240 to 3400 times levels permitted by regulatory standards. As a result, at least 850 former residents filed claims for nearly $4 billion from the military. The contamination appears to have affected the water from two of the eight water wells on the base. The main chemicals involved were volatile organic compounds (VOCs) such as perchloroethylene (PCE), a dry cleaning solvent, and trichloroethylene (TCE), a degreaser; however, more than 70 chemicals have been identified as contaminants at Lejeune. The base's wells were shut off in the mid-1980s, after which the water met federal standards, then they were placed back online in violation of the law. The National Research Council of the National Academies released a report based upon a literature review of PCE and TCE in July 2009. The report failed to assess other contaminants, such as benzene and vinyl chloride, and concluded that the water at the base was tainted between January 1, 1950 and December 31, 1985, but that the contamination could not be linked to any health problems; however, on October 22, 2010, a letter from the Director of the government agency tasked to study health effects at Superfund sites, such as Camp Lejeune, illustrated the limitations of the 2009 literature review and advised that there "was undoubtedly a hazard associated with drinking the contaminated water at Camp Lejeune".

In 1980, the base began testing the water for trihalomethanes in response to new regulations from the Environmental Protection Agency (EPA). That same year, a laboratory from the U.S. Army Environmental Hygiene Agency began finding halogenated hydrocarbons in the water. In March 1981, one of the lab's reports, which was delivered to U.S. Marine officials, stated, "Water is highly contaminated with other chlorinated hydrocarbons (solvents)!"

Possible sources of the contamination include solvents from a nearby, off-base dry cleaning company, from on-base units using chemicals to clean military equipment, and leaks from underground fuel storage tanks. In 1982, a private company, Grainger Laboratories, contracted by the USMC to examine the problem provided the base commander with a report showing that the wells supplying water for the base were contaminated with trichloroethylene and tetrachloroethylene (also known as perchlorethylene). The contractor delivered repeated warnings to base officials, including base chemist Elizabeth Betz, that the water was contaminated. A representative from Grainger, Mike Hargett, stated that he went with Betz in July 1982 to inform an unnamed Marine lieutenant colonel who was deputy director of base utilities about the problems with the water. According to Hargett, the Marine was unwilling to discuss Hargett's concerns. In August 1982, a Grainger chemist, Bruce Babson, sent a letter to the base commander, Marine Major General D. J. Fulham, warning him that the base wells appeared to be poisoned. The water from the contaminated wells, however, continued in use at the base.

Grainger continued to warn Marine officials of problems with the water in December 1982, March 1983, and September 1983. In a spring 1983 report to the EPA, Lejeune officials stated that there were no environmental problems at the base. In June 1983, North Carolina's water supply agency asked Lejeune officials for Grainger's lab reports on the water testing. Marine officials declined to provide the reports to the state agency. In December 1983 Lejeune officials scaled back the water testing performed by Grainger.

=== Further reports ===
In July 1984, a different company contracted under the EPA's Superfund review of Lejeune and other sites found benzene in the base's water, along with PCE and TCE. At this point, chemists were testing individual wells. In one case, a well was found to have a dangerously high concentration of a chemical normally found in gasoline, which should have mandated the well's immediate closure. Marine officials shut down one of the contaminated wells in November 1984 and the others in early 1985. The Marines notified North Carolina of the contamination in December 1984. At this time the Marines did not disclose that benzene had been discovered in the water and stated to the media that the EPA did not mandate unacceptable levels of PCE and TCE.

In 1997 the Agency for Toxic Substances and Disease Registry (ATSDR) investigated the well water and concluded that cancer derived from exposure to the water was unlikely. According to a federal investigation, ATSDR investigators overlooked evidence of benzene in the water when preparing the report.

On April 28, 2009, the ATSDR admitted that the water had been contaminated with benzene and withdrew the 1997 report. The benzene most likely occurred as a result of 800,000 gallons of fuel that leaked from the base fuel farm during the years in question. The fuel leaks occurred near the main well that serves Hadnot Point, location of enlisted and officer's quarters and the base hospital. For unknown reasons, the presence of benzene in the water had been omitted from the USMC report submitted for federal health review in 1992, in spite of the USMC being aware of its presence. The report had been prepared by a contractor, Baker Corp. State officials had also reportedly informed the ATSDR in 1994 about the presence of benzene in the water.

== Responses and actions ==
=== Notifications and responses to initial investigations ===
In 1999 the USMC began to notify former base residents that they might have consumed contaminated water. The notifications were directed by a federal health study examining possible birth defects among children born at the base during the contamination years. Up to this point, many families potentially affected by the water contamination attributed rare illnesses and cancers in their families to bad luck.

In 2005 the US Department of Justice and Environmental Protection Agency (EPA) investigated the USMC's handling of the issue, and reported that they found no criminal conduct by USMC officials. In 2007, however, one of the EPA investigators told Congress that he had recommended obstruction of justice charges against some Camp Lejeune officials, but had been overruled by Justice department prosecutors.

In 2007, Jerry Ensminger, a retired Marine master sergeant, found a document dated 1981 that described a radioactive dump site near a rifle range at the camp. According to the report, the waste was laced with strontium-90, an isotope known to cause leukemia and other cancers. According to Camp Lejeune's installation restoration program manager, base officials learned in 2004 about the 1981 document. Ensminger served in the Marine Corps for 24 and a half years, and lived for part of that time at Camp Lejeune. In 1985 his 9-year-old daughter, Janey, died of cancer.

An advocacy group called The Few, The Proud, The Forgotten was created to inform possible victims of the contamination at Lejeune. The group's website includes an introduction with some basic information about the contamination at Lejeune, including that many health problems, such as various types of cancer, miscarriages, and birth defects, have been noted in people who drank the contaminated water. According to their site, numerous base housing areas were affected by the contamination, including Tarawa Terrace, Midway Park, Berkeley Manor, Paradise Point, Hadnot Point, Hospital Point, and Watkins Village and Knox Trailer Park (Frenchman's Point).

In 2008, the USMC began a Congressionally required notification campaign to notify former base residents of the issue. An online health registry now contains more than 135,000 names.

United States Department of Veterans Affairs (VA) has determined that a former servicemember's cancer was caused by his exposure to the contaminated water. Paul Buckley, a USMC veteran who was diagnosed with incurable hematological malignancy, was stationed at Camp Lejeune in the 1980s. In March 2010 the VA decided that Buckley's cancer was directly linked to his ingestion of contaminated water at Camp Lejeune and awarded him 100% disability benefits. This is believed to be the first time the government has admitted liability. On February 22, 2012, the VA agreed that retired Marine Frank Rachowicz' terminal cancer was caused by exposure to the contaminated water at Camp Lejeune.

=== Lawsuits ===
==== Laura Jones ====
On July 6, 2009, Laura Jones filed a suit against the U.S. government over the contaminated water at the base. Jones previously lived at the base where her husband, a Marine, was stationed.

The U.S. Navy requested a dismissal of the case, stating that the statute of limitations had expired and that regulations at the time did not include contaminants such as trichloroethylene, tetrachloroethylene, vinyl chloride and benzene. U.S. District Judge Terrence Boyle, however, rejected the Navy's arguments and ruled that the suit could go forward. Said Boyle, "The Department of the Navy's unwillingness to release information regarding contamination at Camp Lejeune or to provide notice to former residents remains relevant in that such conduct limited the information available to potential clients." Boyle dismissed a claim by the Navy in November 2010 that Jones had violated the 10-year statute of repose. Said Boyle, "To summarily bar such claims from entering the courthouse would be a profound miscarriage of justice."

==== Joel Shriberg ====
In January 2011, retired Marine Joel P. Shriberg filed suit against the US Government, claiming that Lejeune's contaminated water caused his breast cancer. Shriberg was stationed at Camp Lejeune from September 1957 through April 1959.

==== Litigation, 2011–present ====
In 2011, 10 lawsuits were consolidated in U.S. District Court in the Northern District of Georgia. In October 2014, a federal appeals court rejected the North Carolina legislature's attempt to extend a time limit for filing pollution-related lawsuits. On October 14, 2014, the 11th U.S. Circuit Court ruled that CERCLA did not preempt North Carolina's statutory limits.

A multi-district litigation, MDL-2218, was dismissed on North Carolina statute of repose grounds on December 5, 2016, and the appeal to the 11th Circuit failed (Straw, et al. v. United States, 16-17573). The U.S. Supreme Court refused certiorari. The Camp Lejeune Justice Act of 2022, Section 804 of the PACT Act, S. 3373, now provides an extended period for filing.The Act is also known as "CLJA".

In 2022, as part of the Honoring Our PACT Act, Congress introduced the Camp Lejeune Justice Act. The Camp Lejeune Justice Act would allow those exposed to the contaminated drinking water at the Marine Corps Base to file a Camp Lejeune water contamination lawsuit and recover compensation for their injuries.

==== Andrew U. D. Straw and Straw Family ====
A Fourth Circuit U.S. Court of Appeals Attorney, Andrew U. D. Straw, is a Camp LeJeune CLJA claimant, along with his mother's estate. Straw v. United States, 7:23-cv-162-BO-BM (E.D.N.C.). Straw v. United States, 7:23-cv-1475-FL (E.D.N.C.). Straw's mother died of one of the cancers associated with the Camp LeJeune toxins a few months before he graduated from law school at Indiana University. Straw has appealed and objects to the denial (Dkt. 59) of his motion (Dkt. 56) for health care (including cancer and other health screening and mental health treatments) and education benefits while the case proceeds, given Straw was exposed in utero and after his birth for 583 days, and was born in Camp LeJeune Naval Hospital in 1969. Straw v. United States, 23-2156 (4th Cir. 2024) (DENIED). Straw was denied the Camp LeJeune Family Member Program health care due to his family sleeping off base at night while using the base during the day. Straw has asked the Fourth Circuit to force the Justice Department to offer all victims what they asked in their Navy CLJA claim forms (Dkt. 24) to prevent delay and more wrongful deaths without payment. Straw also wants the Fourth Circuit (Dkt. 33, DENIED) to force DOJ attorney Adam Bain to verbally make a mea culpa statement whenever he appears for any Camp LeJeune matter given Bain opposed the victims in MDL-2218 and other cases. Straw asked the District Court refusal to provide declaratory reliefs (Dkt. 65, text order) to be overturned (DENIED). Those District Court motions were to alleviate harms of discrimination (Dkt. 57-4) and establish facts that are indisputable (Dkt. 58). Straw asked for the trial judge to be changed. (Dkt. 66). The Clerk of the District Court would not do so. (Dkt. 70 text order). Straw asked the Fourth Circuit to change the judge in his Docketing Statement (Dkt. 6) and Opening Brief (Dkt. 7) (DENIED) and notified the appellate court that the district court was refusing to change the judge. Straw's Camp LeJeune conditions can be found in his Short Form Complaint (Dkt 55). His mother's wrongful death from breast cancer is listed in her Short Form Complaint (Dkt. 5). Breast cancer is now a Track 2 trial condition. (Consolidated Litigation, Dkt. 144). Andrew Straw's in forma pauperis status was granted (Dkt. 82) approximately 14 months after he requested it. Under 28 U.S.C. § 1915(e)(2)(B), this "IFP" status means the case was reviewed by the Magistrate Judge and found not to be frivolous or malicious, that it stated a claim on which relief could be granted, and is not against an immune defendant. Straw has 6 mental illness or neurological diagnoses and a cardiac birth defect, and his medications are also used to treat Parkinson's Disease. Straw has alleged symptoms of Parkinson's Disease, which is a Track 1 condition. (Dkt. 23, Case Management ORDER #2).

The Fourth Circuit, Judges King, Agee, and Thacker, dismissed Straw's appeal (Dkt. 51) but Straw petitioned for rehearing (Dkt. 53). Straw withdrew (Dkt. 55) his request for a loan for graduate work when the U.S. Department of Education approved him to have Direct Unsubsidized loans for his master's degree at University of Maine, where Straw was admitted in 2023. Thus, Straw's appeal (Opening Brief at Dkt. 7) is now solely to obtain a loan for medical purposes related to Straw's poisoning, to be repaid from his damage award. Straw was denied en banc review. (Dkt. 61). Straw has requested U.S. Representatives Murphy and Ross to include health care in their proposed corrections litigation for Camp LeJeune Justice Act of 2024.

The Department of Justice has demanded that Straw attempt to mitigate the damages to him from his poisoning. (Dkt. 17, page 29, Aff. Def. #13). For this reason, Straw is suing Indiana for its property takings of his 5 law licenses, initiated as attacks on Straw's 6 mental illnesses, which were caused by Camp LeJeune toxic water. (Complaint)

Straw is also asking the 9th Circuit to decide whether the Judges Act of 1925 is unconstitutional for oppressing the absolute right to appeal to the U.S. Supreme Court. His panel, led by a former U.S. Department of Justice lawyer, denied him but en banc review has yet to be decided. If Straw wins this case, every petition for writ of certiorari filed each year will receive a merits decision, including any Camp LeJeune appeals. Currently and since 1925, petitioners needed 4 justices to give their consent. If Straw prevails, it would mean instead of less than 100 U.S. Supreme Court decisions each year, more than 7,000 would be decided. Straw v. United States, 23-16039 (9th Cir. 2024) (Dkt. 20 Petition for Rehearing En Banc)

==== Consolidated Case in U.S. District Court for the Eastern District of North Carolina ====
There is a separate consolidated case with Leadership Counsel that is litigating general issues that apply to all CLJA cases. Camp Lejeune Water Litigation v. United States, 7:23-cv-00897 (E.D.N.C.). The District Court has severely limited individuals' right to make motions in favor of the consolidated case. It was that motion limitation that led to Straw appealing to the Fourth Circuit. Straw had fully briefed motions months earlier that were simply denied without prejudice due to case management orders in the consolidated case. His renewed motion for medical care payments was denied a second time. (Dkt. 59) The issue of ongoing health care payments to help victims mitigate damages has not arisen in the consolidated case.

In October, the DOJ revealed that there were 117,000 CLJA claimants asking nearly $3.3 trillion in damages. In November, this number rose to over 129,000. CLJA cases and claims amount to one of the largest mass tort lawsuits in U.S. history. As of May 9, 2024, a status report revealed that as of that date there were 227,309 CLJA claims. (Dkt. 201). The June 5, 2024, status report (Dkt. 229) revealed that there were as of that date 1,813 lawsuits filed in the Eastern District of North Carolina and 232,892 CLJA claims to the Navy JAG office.

The plaintiffs' leadership counsel provide an official website with information about this massive lawsuit.

The Court decided that there will be no jury trials under CLJA lawsuits.(Dkt. 133). The proposed Camp LeJeune Justice Act of 2024 introduced in May 2024 would reverse this and give every claimant a jury trial right, among other things. The Court has also rejected simplifying the causation requirement, instead ensuring that every single claimant must prove via experts that their illnesses or death were the result of the Camp LeJeune poisoning "at least as likely as not." (Dkt. 227)

=== U.S. Congressional action ===
==== 2009–2010 ====
In October 2009 North Carolina Congressman Brad Miller announced his intention to add a companion bill to Richard Burr's "Caring for Camp Lejeune Veterans Act of 2009" to provide assistance to possible victims of the Lejeune water contamination. The proposed bills would authorize treatment at a US Veterans Administration facility to any veteran or family member who was based at Camp Lejeune during the time the water was contaminated and suffers from adverse health effects.

Miller and Burr's proposed bill, "Caring for Camp Lejeune Veterans Act of 2011", was approved by the Veteran's Affairs Committee on 29 June 2011 and was sent to the full House and Senate for approval. The bill was expected to cost $3.9 billion over 10 years and directed the Department of Defense to pay, and the VA to provide the care, for victims of the water contamination.

In February 2010, Senator Richard Burr stated that he would hold the nominations of two top Navy civilian officials- Paul Luis Oostburg Sanz as Navy general counsel and Jackalyne Pfannenstiel as assistant Navy secretary for installations and the environment, until the Navy confirmed that it had funded and initiated programs to study the mortality rate of possible victims of the contamination and a plan to compensate any victims for their injuries. The Navy notified Burr the week of March 1, 2010, that it had released $8.8 million to fund the requested study and Burr allowed the nominations of Sanz and Pfannenstiel to go forward. The study will be conducted by the Agency for Toxic Substances and Disease Registry (ATSDR).

In March 2010 a congressional investigation led by Miller asked the Navy and a contractor, Baker Environmental Inc., for documents related to the contamination issue. Miller also asked for access to the Navy's electronic database of documents related to the contamination, which heretofore had not been made publicly accessible."

On March 22, 2010, the ATSDR formally complained to the USMC for withholding details of and access to databases containing more than 700,000 electronic documents related to the water contamination. Said ATSDR Deputy Director Thomas Sinks, "It's interesting that there is information that we continue to discover that we need to go through." The Navy/USMC responded by providing access to ATSDR to the databases and denied that there was any intent to withhold documents from the investigation, saying that all of the documents had already been provided in hard copy. Access to the databases, however, was not provided to two panels advising the US Government on the contamination issue, with the USMC saying that the panel members must use the Freedom of Information Act to obtain access to the documents.

In September 2010 Miller and the oversight subcommittee of the United States House Committee on Science and Technology held hearings into the contamination. The committee focused in part on the 1997 ATSDR report and on a booklet the USMC released in July 2010 about the contamination which Miller described as "more public relations than public health." Congressional investigators and the Agency for Toxic Substances and Disease Registry have asked the Marine Corps to retract the booklet, which contains information its critics have called "misleading".

==== 2011–present ====
In April 2011, five members of Congress sent the Navy a letter criticizing its continued behavior regarding the issue. They accused the Navy of continuing to mischaracterize the 2009 report by the National Academy of the Sciences' National Research Council, which concluded there was no concrete link between the chemicals trichloroethylene and tetrachloroethylene and the ailments suffered by veterans and family. The Navy states that the report also assessed benzene exposure, which is false, according to the members' letter.

In June 2011 the Agency for Toxic Substances & Disease Registry began sending a survey to approximately 350,000 former employees or residents of Camp Lejeune. The purpose of the survey was to determine what diseases may be linked to the water contamination. The agency's report was expected to be completed in 2014.

In 2011 a documentary film on the water contamination was produced and released by Wider Film Projects/Tracks Films called Semper Fi: Always Faithful. The film, directed by Tony Hardmon and Rachel Libert, made the 15-film short list for consideration for a 2012 Academy Award for Best Documentary Feature Film.

On April 20, 2012, members of the House and Senate Veterans' Affairs Committees signed a letter to President Obama asking that health care for Camp Lejeune contamination victims be expedited. Veterans Affairs Secretary Eric Shinseki responded that providing healthcare to Camp Lejeune veterans was "premature". The Government Accountability Office, on May 2, 2012, issued a report recommending that the DoD update its processes for addressing possible health effects from toxic exposure. Retired Marine drill instructor Jerry Ensminger started a petition requesting that the US government begin providing healthcare to Camp Lejeune veterans exposed to the toxic water. More than 136,000 people signed the Change.org petition.

In February 2014 the Centers for Disease Control and Prevention issued its report on the effects of the water contamination. The report found that Lejeune Marines had about a 10 percent higher risk of dying from any type of cancer compared to the Marines stationed at Camp Pendleton. Lejeune Marines had a 35 percent higher risk of kidney cancer, a 42 percent higher risk of liver cancer, a 47 percent higher risk of Hodgkin lymphoma, a 68 percent higher risk of multiple myeloma, and double the risk of ALS.

==== Janey Ensminger Act ====
On July 18, 2012, the US Senate passed the Janey Ensminger Act authorizing medical care to military and family members who had resided at the base between 1957 and 1987 and developed conditions linked to the water contamination. The measure applies to up to 750,000 people. The House approved the bill on July 31, 2012. President Obama signed the bill into law on August 6, 2012.

The bill applies to 15 specific ailments believed to be linked to the contamination. The Department of Veterans Affairs is assigned to provide medical care. To fund the medical care, the bill extends higher fees for VA home loan guarantees to October 1, 2017.

While this law applies to all veterans who served at the base for 30 days regardless of where they slept at night, the same is not true of civilian family members, who are excluded if they did not live on base with an on base address for 30 days. During the Vietnam War era, about 50% of the USMC families lived off base while using the base as long as the veteran was stationed there. This means that for a large part of the children affected, they are not covered by CLFMP (Camp LeJeune Family Member Program, created by the Janey Ensminger Act) due to this on-base address requirement. Andrew Straw litigated this for himself for 7 years and was finally denied by the Federal Circuit in 2021.

While CLFMP has such a base address requirement, the CLJA does not. Thus, while a person may receive millions of dollars for their exposure and injuries under CLJA, they may be excluded from the health care under CLFMP that would help screen for those CLJA-covered conditions. Congress has not addressed this inconsistency yet, but Straw is seeking health care and education payments under CLJA, currently before the Fourth Circuit because the District Court in Eastern District of North Carolina denied him. See above.

==== Camp Lejeune Justice Act of 2022 ====
Efforts to create a Camp Lejeune Justice Act were renewed in 2022 and the Camp Lejeune Justice Act became Section 706 of the SFC Heath Robinson Honoring Our PACT Act, H.R. 3967. This Act was packaged as S. 3373 with the Camp Lejeune Justice Act and finally passed by a vote of 86–11 on August 2, 2022. President Biden was scheduled to sign this bill on August 8, 2022, in a White House Rose Garden ceremony.

The language of Section 804 provides for monetary relief for those injured by exposure to the Camp Lejeune base and its toxic water by 30 days of "living", "working", or otherwise being exposed between 1953 and 1987 is the prerequisite for compensation. This includes in-utero exposure. There is a jury trial right that is not present in the Federal Tort Claims Act. Also, there is no requirement to prove negligence, making this what is known in tort law as a strict liability relief. All immunities that were used in the Multi-District Litigation are stripped by this new law, making it much easier for veterans, their family members, and others poisoned and injured to get relief. Many mass tort law firms have begun advertising for Camp Lejeune clients and there are conferences being held on this subject.

==== Camp Lejeune Justice Act of 2024 ====
Various errors in the original Act were identified and a corrections bill was introduced in May 2024 by Rep. Deborah Ross and Rep. Greg Murphy. The Bill did not get a reading and died in Congress.

=== Media campaigns ===
The mass torts enabled by Camp Lejune legislation have been heavily advertised. In the second half of 2022 alone, various agencies spent $90 million on 150000 advertisements, including on social media platforms such as TikTok, where the number of possible claimants is thought to be small. The inundation of ads led to concern that some of the advertisements would direct claimants to law firms characterized as predatory. One advertiser was quoted as saying, "We know it's annoying[. ...] My neighbors have told me, please stop".

== See also ==
- Agency for Toxic Substances and Disease Registry (ATSDR), "ATSDR is the lead federal public health agency for determining, preventing, and mitigating the human health effects of exposure to hazardous substance."
- Red Hill water crisis, which involved water contamination at Joint Base Pearl Harbor–Hickam
- Parkinson's disease
