= Total petroleum hydrocarbon =

Total concentration of petroleum-derived hydrocarbons in environmental samples

Total petroleum hydrocarbons (TPH) is a term used for any mixture of hydrocarbons that are found in crude oil. There are several hundred of these compounds, but not all occur in any one sample; because there are so many different chemicals in crude oil and in other petroleum products, it is not practical to measure each one separately when testing for contamination. However, it is useful to measure the total amount of TPH at a site. Chemicals that occur in TPH include hexane, benzene, toluene, xylenes, naphthalene, fluorene, and constituents of commonly used fuels among others. Petroleum hydrocarbon ranges are monitored at various levels depending on the state and testing site.

TPH is the sum of volatile petroleum hydrocarbons (VPH) and extractable petroleum hydrocarbons (EPH). VPH is also known as petrol (or gasoline) range organics (PRO or GRO) and includes hydrocarbons from C6-C10. Diesel range organics (DRO) includes hydrocarbons from C10-C28.

Various methods to analyze the components of TPH are introduced in a Nordic report that evaluates new methods of analysis that avoid banned ozone depleting substances.
