= Marine Corps Base Camp Lejeune =

Marine Corps base in North Carolina, US

- Near Jacksonville, North Carolina in the United States
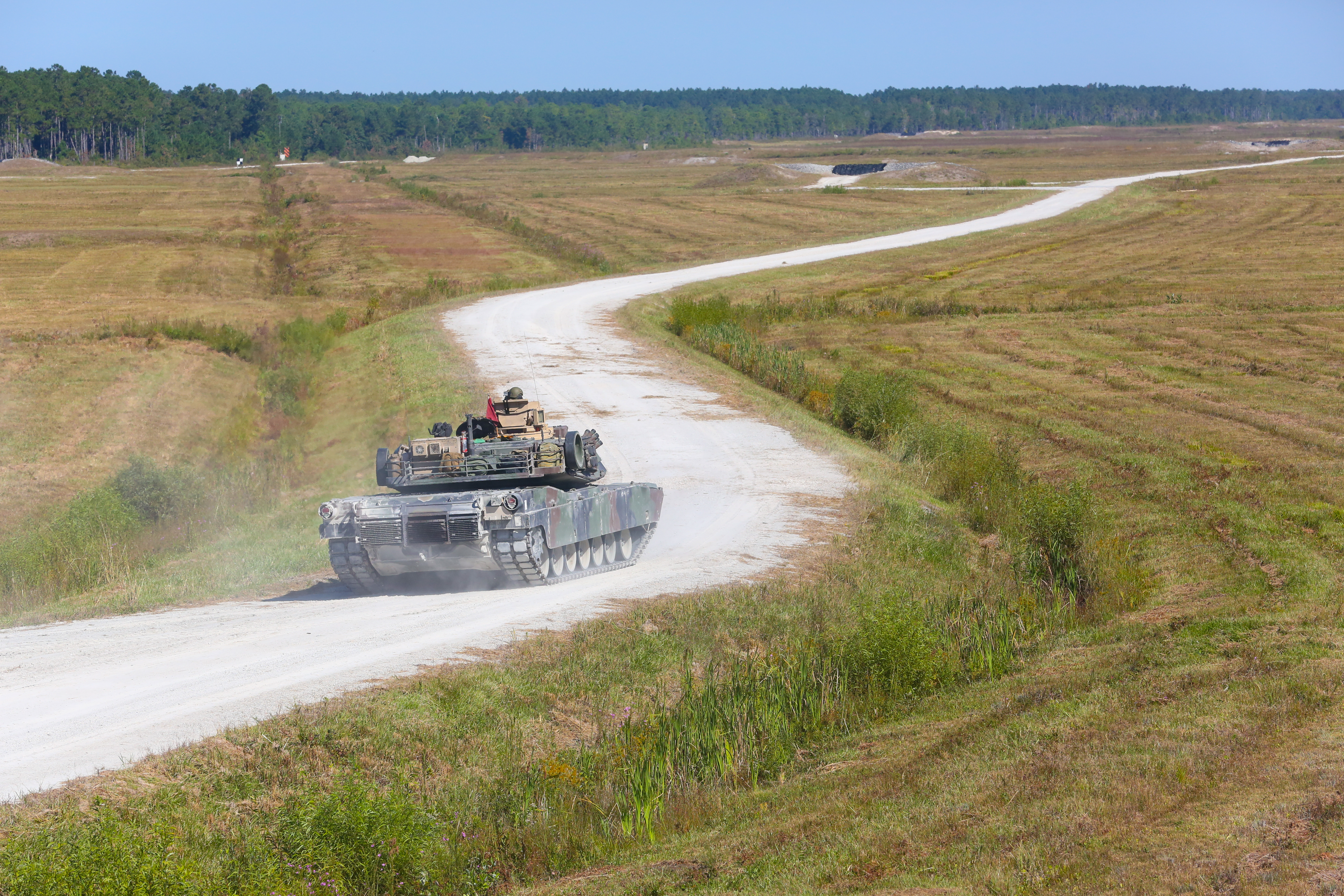
- A M1A1 Abrams main battle tank with 2nd Tank Battalion, 2nd Marine Division at Camp Lejeune during 2013

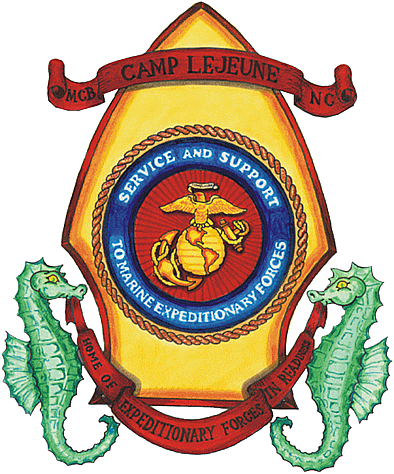

Site information
- Type: Marine Corps base
- Owner: Department of Defense
- Operator: US Marine Corps
- Controlled by: Marine Corps Installations East
- Condition: Operational
- Website: Official website

Location
- Location in the United States Location in North Carolina
- Coordinates: 34°35′00.9″N 77°21′37.4″W

Site history
- Built: 1941
- In use: 1941–present
- Events: Water contamination (1953–1987); Camp Lejeune incident (1969); Murder of Maria Lauterbach (2007); Hurricane Florence (2018)

Garrison information
- Current commander: BGen Ralph J Rizzo Jr
- Garrison: II Marine Expeditionary Force; Marine Special Operations Command

Marine Corps Base Camp Lejeune (/ləˈʒɜːrn/ lə-ZHURN or /ləˈʒuːn/ lə-ZHOON) is a 246-square-mile (640 km^{2}) United States military training facility in Jacksonville, North Carolina. Its 14 miles (23 km) of beaches make the base a major area for amphibious assault training, and its location between two deep-water ports (Wilmington and Morehead City) allows for fast deployments. The main base is supplemented by six satellite facilities: Marine Corps Air Station New River, Camp Geiger, Stone Bay, Courthouse Bay, Camp Johnson, and the Greater Sandy Run Training Area. The Marine Corps port facility is in Beaufort, at the southern tip of Radio Island (between the NC State Port in Morehead City, and the marine science laboratories on Pivers Island in Beaufort). It is occupied only during military port operations.

== Facilities ==
Camp Lejeune encompasses 156,000 acres, with 18 kilometers of beach capable of supporting amphibious operations, 32 gun positions, 48 tactical landing zones, three state-of-the-art training facilities for Military Operations in Urban Terrain and 80 live fire ranges to include the Greater Sandy Run Training Area. Military forces from around the world come to Camp Lejeune regularly for bilateral and NATO-sponsored exercises.

Resident commands at Camp Lejeune include:

- II Marine Expeditionary Force
- Marine Corps Forces Special Operations Command
- 2nd Marine Division
- 2nd Marine Logistics Group
- 2nd Marine Expeditionary Brigade
- 22nd Marine Expeditionary Unit
- 24th Marine Expeditionary Unit
- 26th Marine Expeditionary Unit
- 2nd Reconnaissance Battalion
- 2nd Intelligence Battalion
- Marine Corps Installations East
- 10th Marine Regiment
- United States Marine Corps School of Infantry
- Marine Corps Engineer School
- Marine Corps Combat Service Support Schools
- Marine Raider Regiment
- Marine Special Operations Support Group
- Special Missions Training Center (USCG)
- Reserve Support Unit
- Naval Hospital Camp Lejeune
- Field Medical Training Battalion (FMTB)

Recreation & Fitness:

Auto Skills Center, Bowling, Community Centers, Golf Course, Inline Hockey, Marinas, Paintball, Movie Theater, Onslow Beach Facilities, Outdoor Adventures Center, Pools, Fishing, Hunting, Beach Camping, Recreational Shooting, E-sports Center, Recreational Equipment Checkout & Rentals, Skate Park, and a large number of Sports and Gym facilities.

Portions of Camp Lejeune are in the Jacksonville city limits while other parts are in unincorporated areas.

== History ==
In April 1941, construction was approved on an 11,000-acre (45 km^{2}) tract in Onslow County, North Carolina. On May 1 of that year, Lieutenant Colonel William P. T. Hill began construction on Marine Barracks New River. The first base headquarters was in a summer cottage on Montford Point and then moved to Hadnot Point in 1942. The base was known as Marine Barracks New River, N.C. Later that year it was renamed in honor of the 13th Commandant of the Marine Corps, John A. Lejeune, upon his death.

One of the satellite facilities of Camp Lejeune served for a while as a third boot camp for the Marines, in addition to Parris Island and San Diego. That facility, Montford Point Camp, was established after Franklin D. Roosevelt signed Executive Order 8802. Between 1942 and 1949, a brief era of segregated training for black Marines, the camp at Montford Point trained 20,000 African Americans. After the military was ordered to fully integrate, Montford Point was renamed Camp Gilbert H. Johnson and became the home of the Marine Corps Combat Service Support Schools.

On May 10, 1996, two helicopters performing a joint United States/British training exercise collided and crashed into a swampy wooded area, killing fourteen and injuring two.

In mid-September 2018, Hurricane Florence damaged IT systems and over 900 buildings in the camp, leading to a $3.6 billion repair cost. Seventy percent of base housing was damaged, and 84,000 gallons of sewage were released.

Camp Lejeune is a seven-time recipient of the Commander-in-Chiefs Award for Installation Excellence.

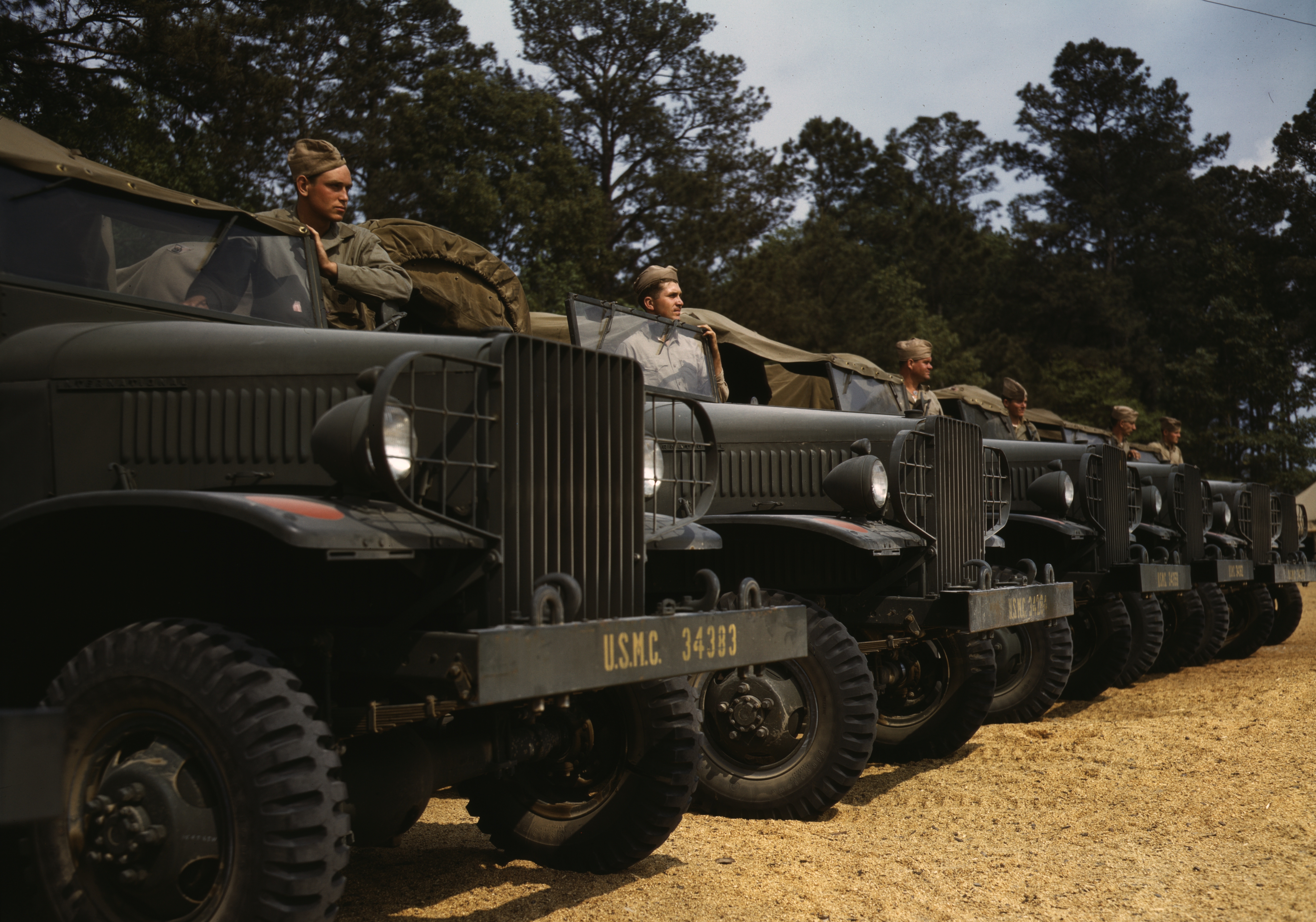
Marine motor detachment, New River Barracks, 1942

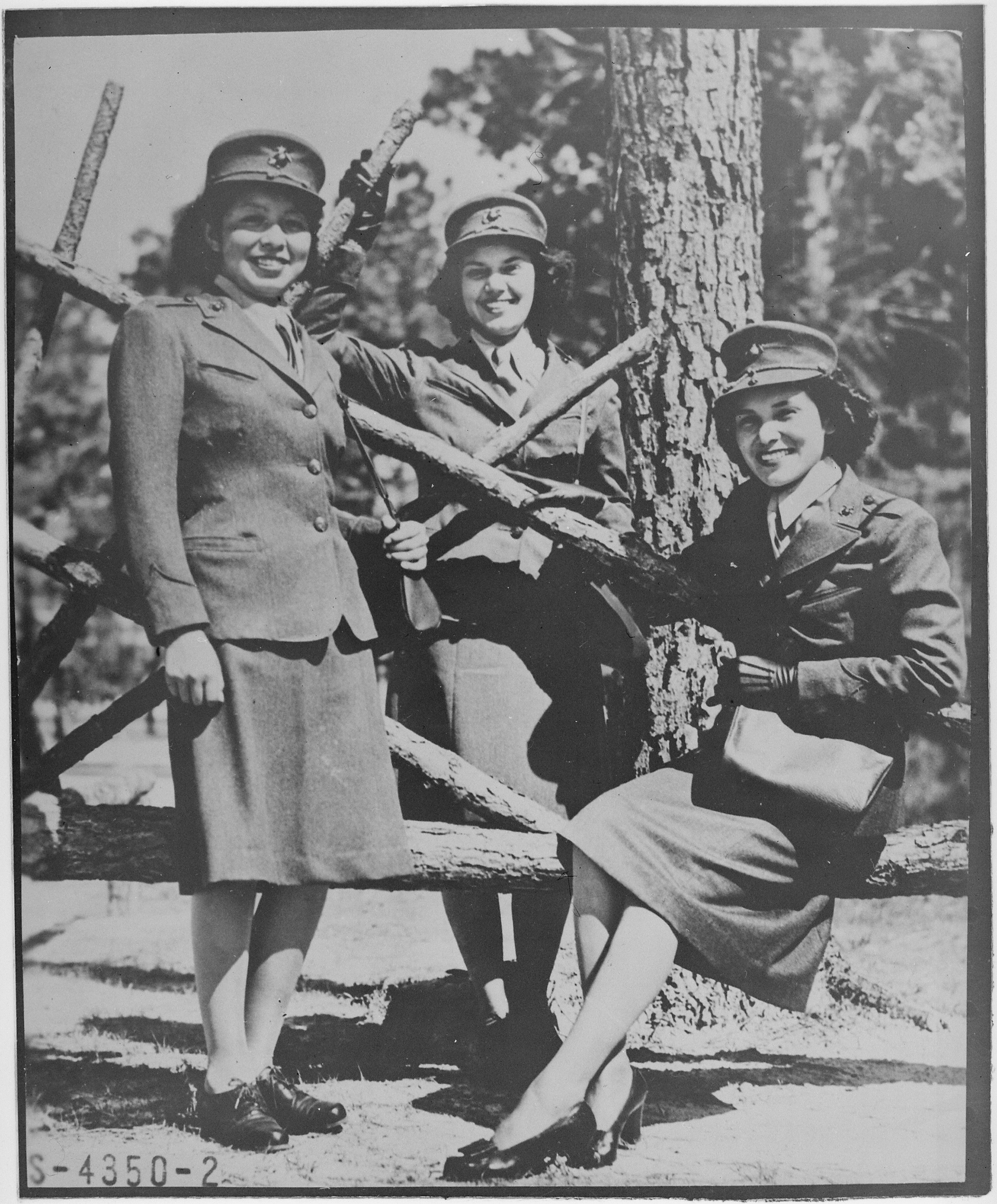
American Indian Women Reservists at Camp Lejeune during 1943

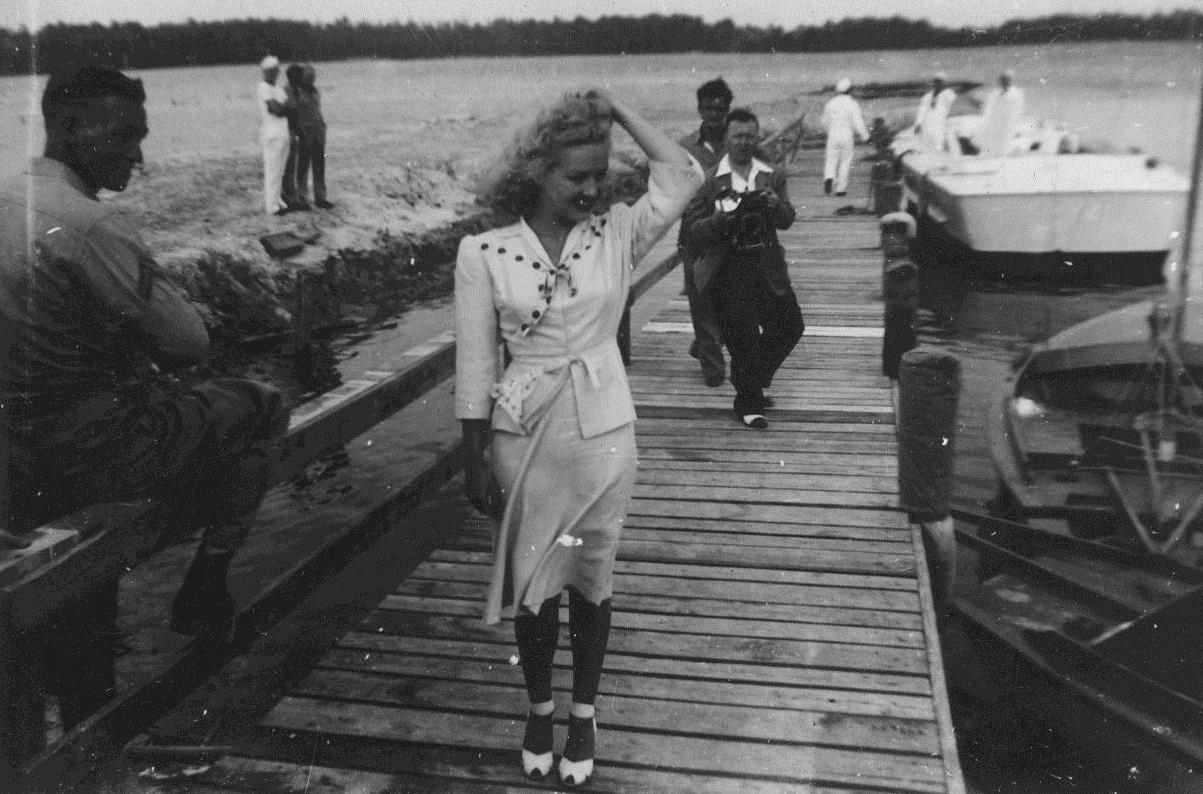
Betty Grable at the New River, 1942

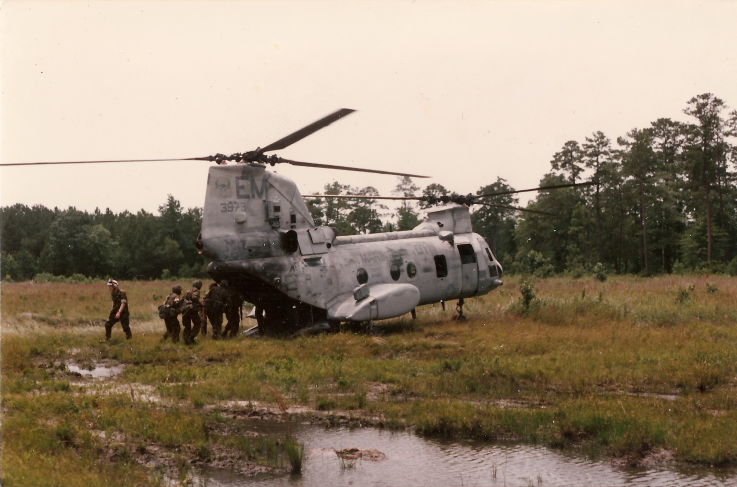
Royal Bermuda Regiment soldiers board a USMC CH-46 Sea Knight helicopter at Camp Lejeune, 1994

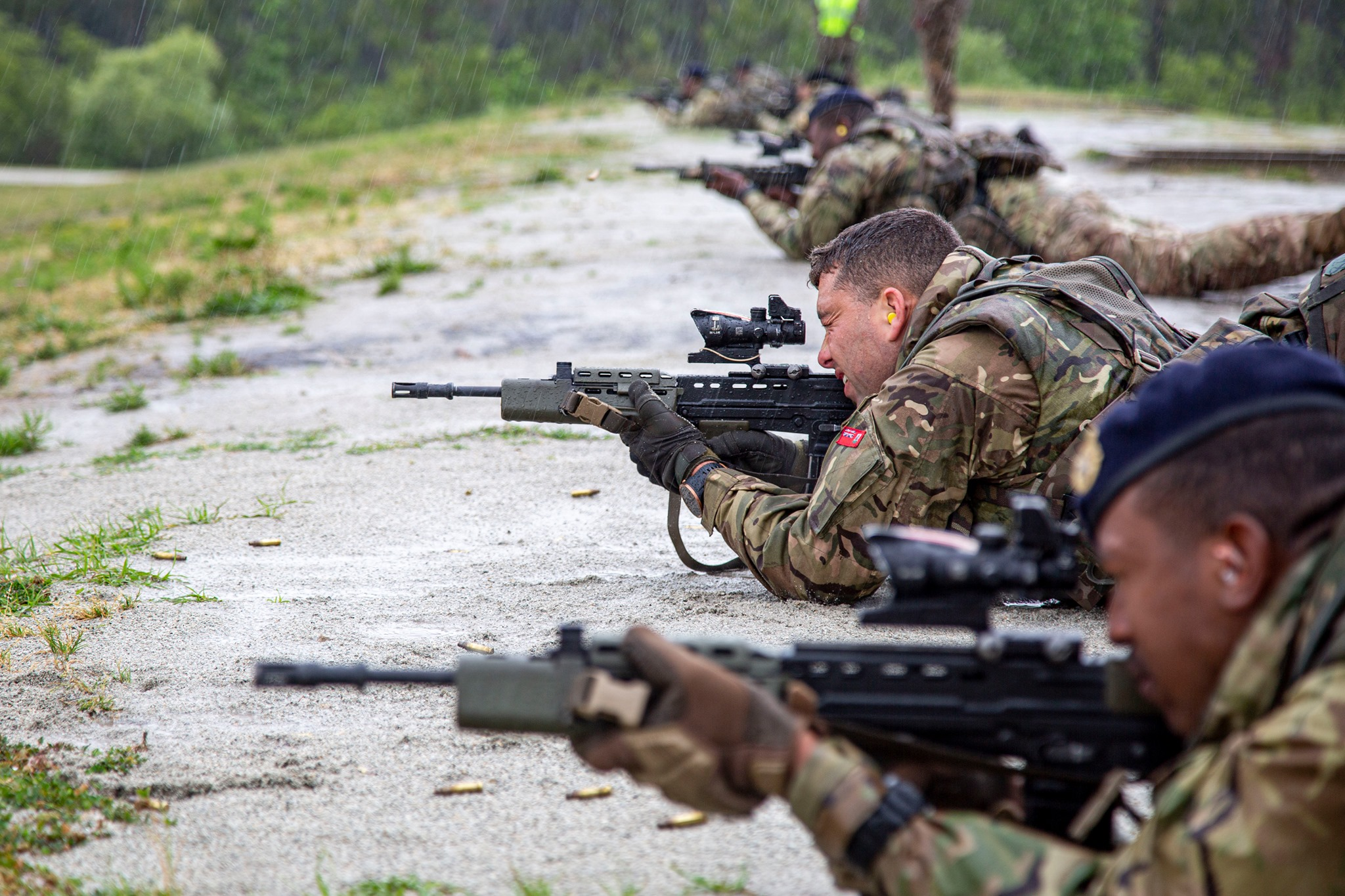
Royal Bermuda Regiment shoot at Stonebay Rifle Range on 12 May 2021

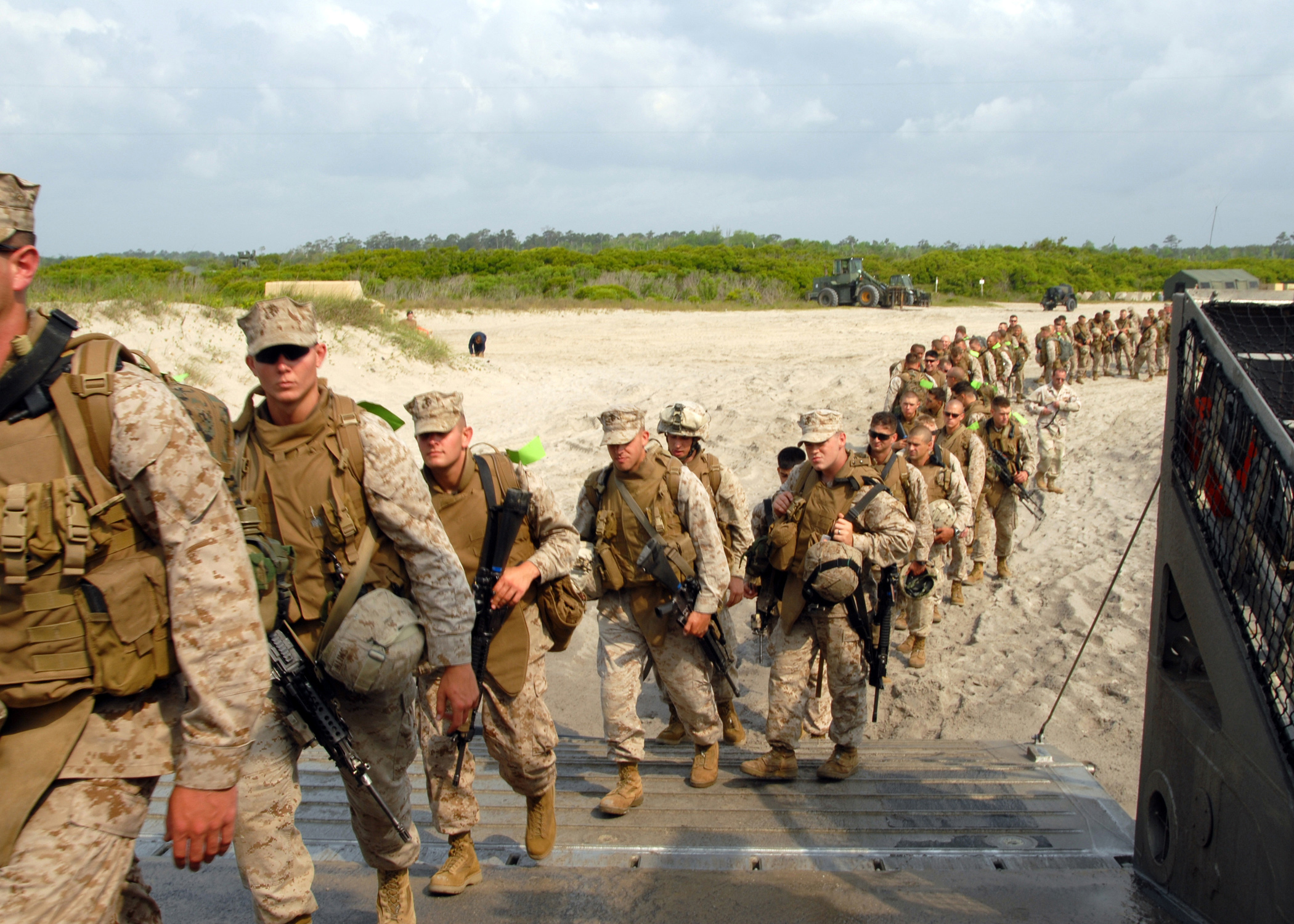
Marines stationed at Camp Lejeune, 2008

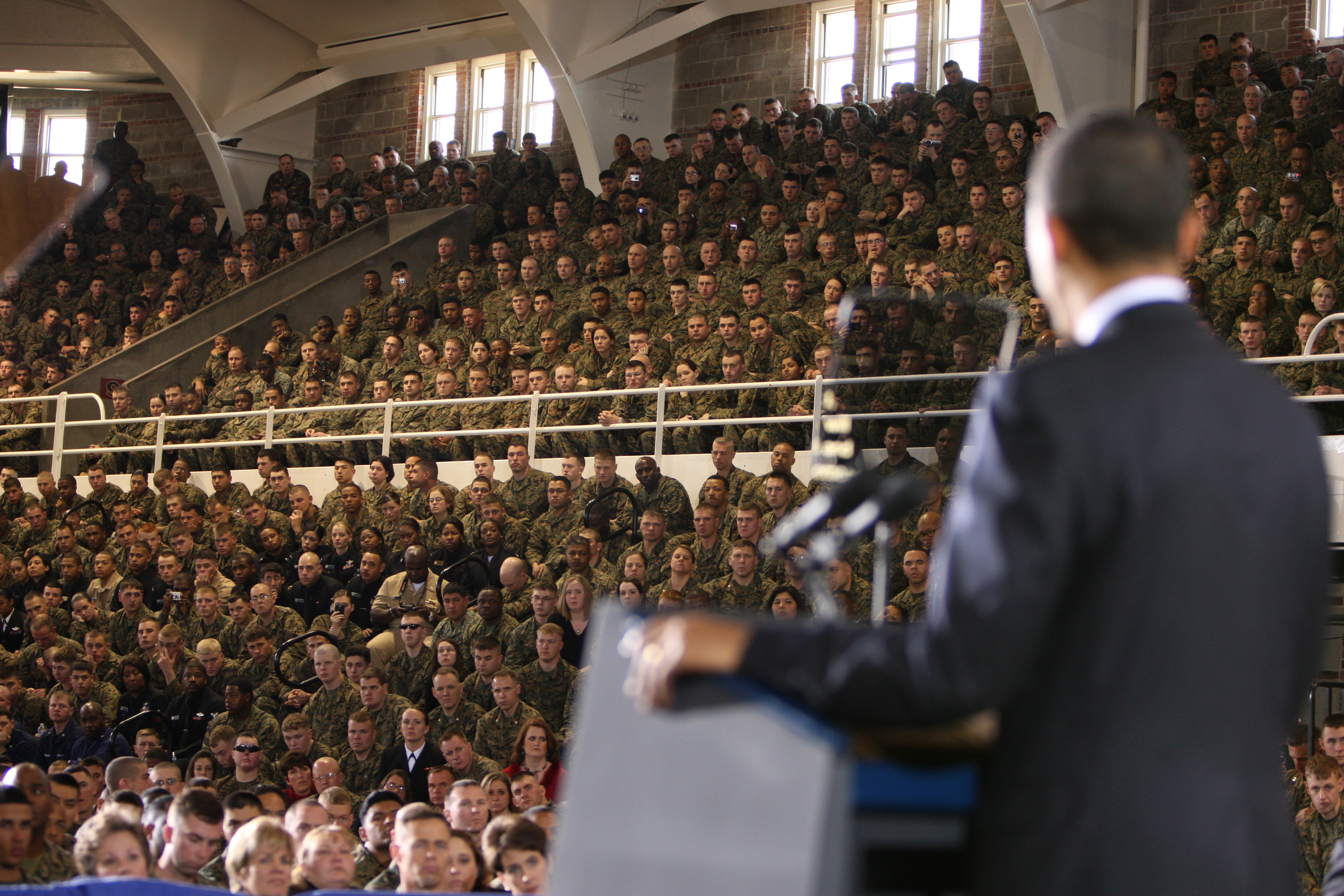
Barack Obama at Camp Lejeune, 2009

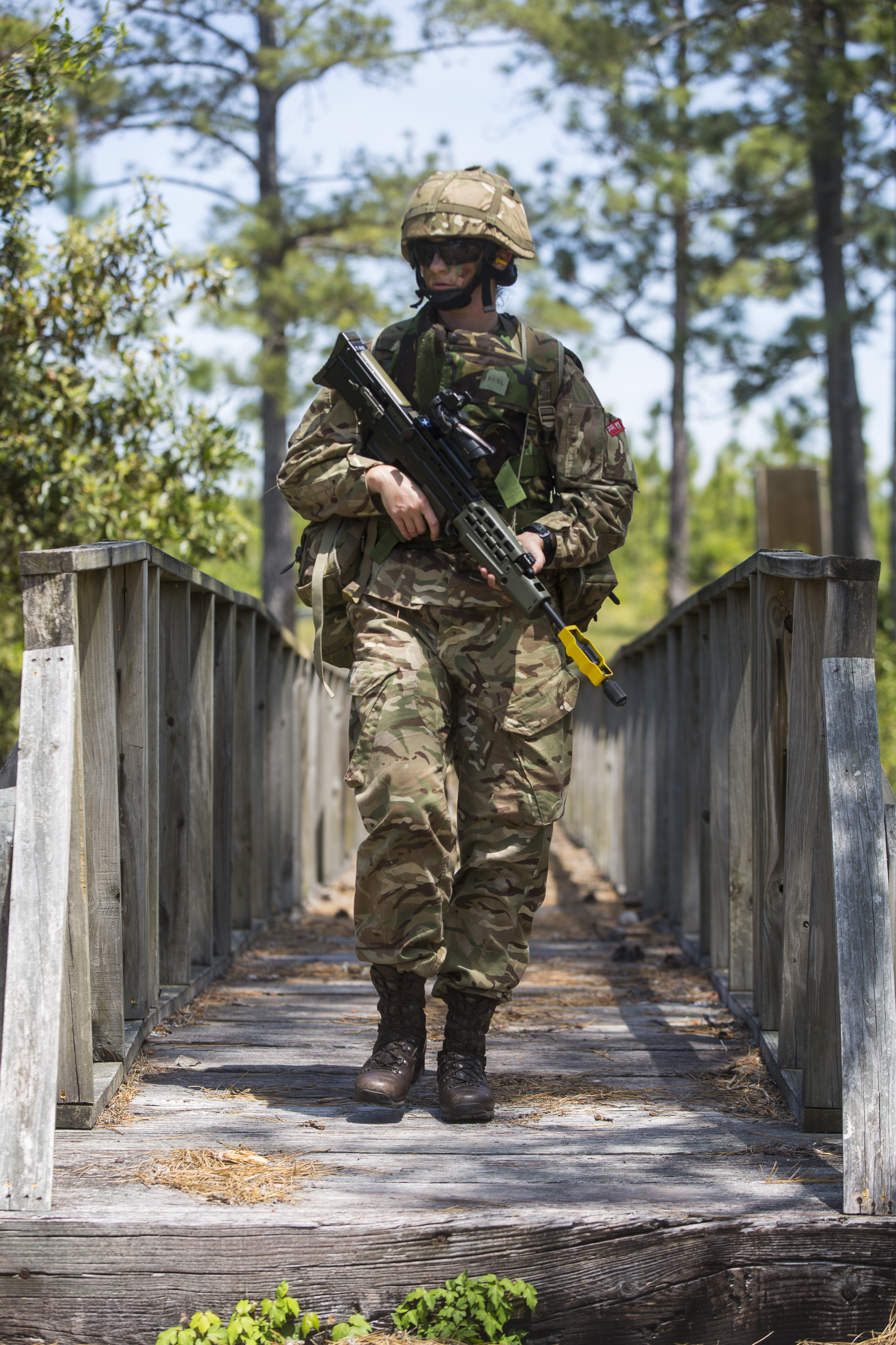
Royal Bermuda Regiment soldier with an L85A2 at USMC Camp Lejeune in 2018

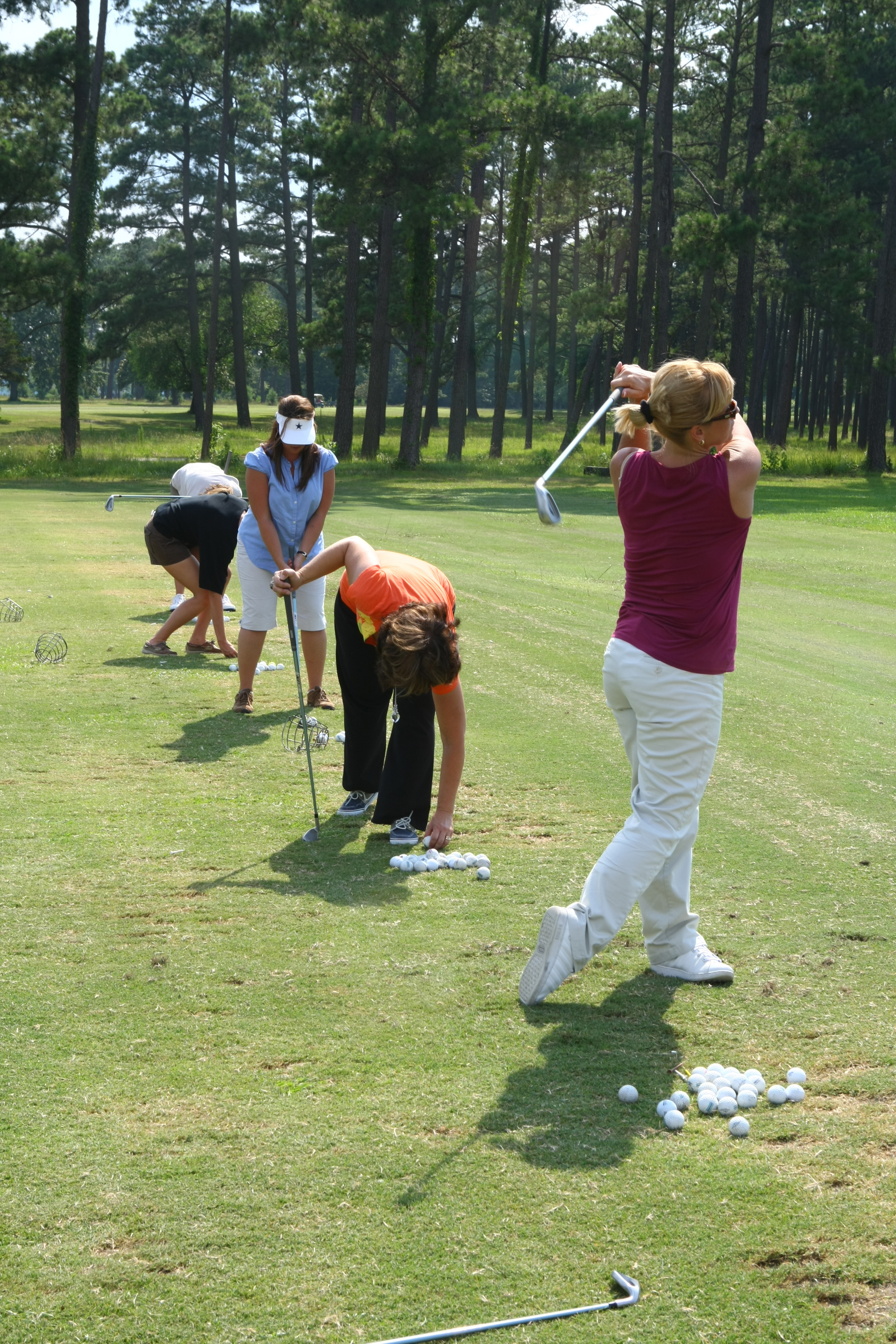
Ladies golf clinic on the base course sponsored by Paradise Point Golf Course and Marine Corps Community Services

== Drinking water contamination ==
From at least 1953 through 1987, Marines and their families at Lejeune drank and bathed in water contaminated with toxicants at concentrations 240 to 3,400 times greater than permitted by safety standards. A 1974 base order required safe disposal of solvents and warned that improper handling could cause drinking water contamination, yet solvents were dumped or buried near base wells for years. The base's wells were shut off in the mid-1980s but were placed back online in violation of the law. In 1982, volatile organic compounds (VOCs) were found in Camp Lejeune's drinking water supply. VOC contamination of groundwater can cause birth defects and other ill health effects in pregnant and nursing mothers. This information was not made public for nearly two decades, when the government attempted to identify those who may have been exposed. In 1989, the United States Environmental Protection Agency (USEPA) placed Camp Lejeune on the Superfund program's National Priorities List (NPL) because of the contamination of soil, surface water, and groundwater.

An advocacy group called The Few, The Proud, The Forgotten was created to inform possible victims of the contamination at Lejeune. The group's website includes an introduction with some basic information about the contamination at Lejeune, including that many health problems such as various types of cancer, leukemia, miscarriages, and birth defects, have been noted in people who drank the contaminated water. According to the site, numerous base housing areas were affected by the contamination, including Tarawa Terrace, Midway Park, Berkeley Manor, Paradise Point, Hadnot Point, Hospital Point, and Watkins Village. As many as 500,000 people may have been exposed to contaminated water at Camp Lejeune over a period of 30 years.

=== Camp Lejeune Justice Act of 2022 ===
Efforts to create a Camp Lejeune Justice Act in 2021 failed, but the effort was renewed in 2022 when Camp Lejeune Justice Act became Section 706 of the SFC Heath Robinson Honoring Our PACT Act, H.R. 3967. The U.S. House passed H.R. 3967 on March 3, 2022, by a vote of 256–174. The U.S. Senate passed H.R. 3967 with some minor amendments on June 16, 2022, by a vote of 84–14. Following the bill's passage in the U.S. Senate, President Biden's White House made a celebratory statement that included mention of Camp Lejeune victims. There were constitutional taxation problems with the amended version and a "blue slip" was issued causing the matter to return to the U.S. House. The U.S. House made the changes necessary to avoid the constitutional issue and passed the PACT Act on July 13, 2022, by a vote of 342–88. This new PACT Act was repackaged as S. 3373 with the Camp LeJeune Justice Act set as Section 804. Some Republican senators changed their votes and refused cloture on July 27, 2022, by a vote of 55–42. After several days of veterans protesting at the Capitol, there was another vote on S. 3373 and this time it passed by a vote of 86–11 on August 2, 2022. The bill was signed into law by President Biden on August 10, 2022.

The language of Section 804 provides for monetary relief for those injured by exposure to the Camp Lejeune base and its toxic water. Thirty days of "living" or "working" or "otherwise" being exposed between 1953 and 1987 is the prerequisite for compensation. This includes in-utero exposure. Harms must be demonstrated and must be associated with some condition caused by the base toxicants. Some possible conditions may include those listed for the Janey Ensminger Act of 2012. 38 C.F.R. 17.400(b).

=== Litigation ===
At least 850 former residents filed claims for nearly $4 billion from the military. The multi-district litigation, MDL-2218, was dismissed on North Carolina statute of repose grounds on December 5, 2016, and the appeal to the 11th Circuit failed (Straw, et al. v. United States, 16–17573). The U.S. Supreme Court refused certiorari. A U.S. Supreme Court ruling in June 2014 potentially curbed groundwater contamination lawsuits by families at Camp Lejeune. Federal law, which imposes a two-year statute of limitations after the harm is discovered, preempts North Carolina's 10-year statute of repose law, but this was not followed by the 11th Circuit. State lawmakers tried to eliminate the state prohibition on lawsuits being filed 10 years after the last pollution occurred or from the time a polluted property was sold. The Camp LeJeune Justice Act of 2022, Section 804(b) of the PACT Act, S. 3373, provides an entirely new means for justice to the victims and removes normal tort defenses. Public Law 117-168, SEC. 804(b), 136 Stat. 1802–1804.

Disability activist, lawyer, columnist, and politician, Andrew U. D. Straw, has appealed his cases unsuccessfully. He has also pursued claims at the U.S. Court of Federal Claims, stating that the U.S. Marine Corps' UCMJ responsibilities imply a contract to protect U.S. Marine Corps family members (Straw v. United States, 1:17-cv-00560, U.S. COFC). This case was dismissed and denied on appeal. Straw has advocated for legislative reform to avoid the legal arguments of the Department of Justice. The main chemicals involved were trichloroethylene (TCE, a degreaser), perchloroethylene (PCE, a dry cleaning solvent), vinyl chloride, and benzene; however, more than 70 chemicals have been identified as contaminants at Lejeune. Andrew Straw is pursuing his own infant brain injury pro se and as estate executor for the wrongful death of his mother from a Camp LeJeune cancer. Straw v. United States, 7:23-cv-1475-FL (E.D.N.C.)

Straw has sought not only compensation, but he also has sought health care under the Janey Ensminger Act of 2012. He litigated for that benefit for seven years. He was rejected at the Department of Veterans Affairs (VA), the BVA, the U.S. Court of Veterans Claims, and finally in 2021 at the Federal Circuit. Despite Straw being born at Camp Lejeune in 1969, his having 19 months of base access while his father worked there as a U.S. Marine, the language of the Janey Ensminger Act was interpreted narrowly so as to deny Straw this benefit. Straw's parents had a home off base at the time of his birth and this is where they slept, even while using and working at the base during the day from 1968–1970. The fact that Straw's mother died from one of the cancers listed in the Act and Straw having neurobehavioral effects listed in the Act was irrelevant to the Federal Circuit. The Federal Circuit also refused to consider the misapplication of the North Carolina Statute of Repose as being a taking of private property. Straw v. Wilkie, 843 F. App’x 263 (Fed. Cir. 1/15/2021); Straw v. United States, 4 F.4th 1358 (Fed. Cir. 2021). The narrow construction of the Janey Ensminger Act of 2012 in Straw's case led to the Camp LeJeune Justice Act of 2022 having no such on-base limitation. Straw suggested that change to Attorney Ed Bell, the author of the CLJA, and Bell agreed. The new 2022 law provides a catch-all "otherwise exposed" inclusive provision so such exclusion for sleeping off base cannot be used to deny the relief.

On March 8, 2010, Paul Buckley of Hanover, Massachusetts, received a 100 percent, service-connected disability from the Department of Veterans Affairs for cancer (multiple myeloma), which was linked to toxic water exposure on Camp Lejeune. This is believed to be the first time the government has admitted the link between the contamination and illnesses.

In 2007, Jerry Ensminger, a retired Marine master sergeant, found a document dated 1981 that described a radioactive dump site near a rifle range at the camp. According to the report, the waste was laced with strontium-90, an isotope known to cause cancer and leukemia. According to Camp Lejeune's installation restoration program manager, base officials learned about the document in 2004. Ensminger served in the Marine Corps for 24 1/2 years and lived for part of that time at Camp Lejeune. In 1985, his nine-year-old daughter, Janey, died of cancer. Straw's mother died in 1997 from breast cancer.

On July 6, 2009, Laura Jones filed suit against the U.S. government over the contaminated water at the base. Jones previously lived at the base where her husband, a Marine, was stationed, and she has since been diagnosed with lymphoma. Twenty former residents of Camp Lejeune—all men who lived there during the 1960s and the 1980s—have been diagnosed with breast cancer. In April 2009, the United States Agency for Toxic Substances and Disease Registry withdrew a 1997 public health assessment at Camp Lejeune that denied any connection between the toxicants and illness.

On August 10, 2022, President Biden signed the Camp Lejeune Justice Act of 2022, allowing victims to sue for sicknesses related to water contamination at Camp Lejeune.

Straw has renewed his several claims for compensation. Straw v. United States, 7:23-cv-162-BO-BM (E.D.N.C.) (Camp LeJeune Justice Act lawsuit, docketed 2/21/2023). The Estate of Straw's mother also has a claim pending at U.S. Navy JAG Code 15 for her wrongful death from breast cancer. CLS23-5185. Straw is appealing the denial of his motion for health care and education benefits. Straw v. United States, 23-2156 (4th Cir. 2024) (DENIED)

One of the Department of Justice (DOJ) lawyers involved in denial of relief under Federal Tort Claims Act (FTCA) in MDL-2218, Adam Bain, has appeared again in CLJA case filings. Estate of Jane Ensminger v. United States, 7:23-cv-161 (E.D.N.C.)

A review of the backgrounds of 4th Circuit judges on Ballotpedia.org reveals that half of the 14 judges worked for the Justice Department or federal government prior to appointment to the bench and several were JAG attorneys for the Military previously.

The lead attorneys for the plaintiffs have set up a website to inform the victims and the public of happenings in the case. The Court ordered these attorneys to submit a Master Complaint that will apply to all lawsuits and plaintiffs. The Master Complaint is now online. Each plaintiff is required to submit a short form complaint using a template provided by the Court at pages 14–18 of its Case Management Order #2. The government had until November 20, 2023, to answer. The consolidated case is meant to streamline prosecution of the matter. The government told the Court in November 2023 that there were over 1,300 cases in federal court along with 117,000 claims at Navy JAG under Camp LeJeune Justice Act (CLJA), amounting to $3.3 trillion in claims.

In 2024 The U.S. Navy received over 546,500 claims for compensation from people impacted by the contaminated water at Marine Corps Base Camp Lejeune that were submitted by the August 10, 2024, deadline.

=== Janey Ensminger Act ===
In July 2012, the U.S. Senate passed a bill, called the Janey Ensminger Act in honor of retired Marine Master Sergeant Jerry Ensminger's daughter Janey who died of cancer at age 9, authorizing medical care to military and family members who had resided at the base between 1957 and 1987 and developed conditions linked to the water contamination. The measure applies to up to 750,000 people. The bill applies to 15 specific ailments believed to be linked to the contamination, including cancer of the esophagus, lung, breast, bladder or kidney; leukemia; multiple myeloma; myleodysplasic syndromes; renal toxicity; hepatic steatosis; female infertility; miscarriage; scleroderma; and/or neurobehavioral effects or non-Hodgkin's lymphoma. The Department of Veterans Affairs is assigned to provide the medical care. To fund the medical care, the bill extended higher fees for VA home loan guarantees through 2017. This health coverage was worded to require the victim to have lived on the base and any civilian dependent who slept off base was excluded regardless of getting the illnesses on the list. Straw v. Wilkie, 843 F. App’x 263 (Fed. Cir. 1/15/2021). (Straw was born at Camp LeJeune Naval Hospital and had base access for 19 months but was denied health care for a condition—bipolar disorder—PCE doubles the chance of contracting).

A 2023 cohort study of 172,128 American veterans who were stationed in Lejeune and 168,361 who were stationed in Camp Pendleton found that the rates of Parkinson's disease were 70% higher in Lejeune as compared to Pendleton, suggesting that exposure to trichloroethylene in the water may increase risk of Parkinson's disease.

A Cancer Incidence Study was delayed at Agency for Toxic Substances and Disease Registry (ATSDR) when this information may be critical to the victims in obtaining compensation. The Cancer Incidence Study was released at the end of January 2024 after about 8 years of work. It showed more evidence that the water increased the risk of various cancers. Another ATSDR mortality study showed that the risk of death from Camp LeJeune exposure and diseases was elevated. ATSDR provides a FAQ about Camp LeJeune toxic exposure and various studies done or to be done.

== Education ==
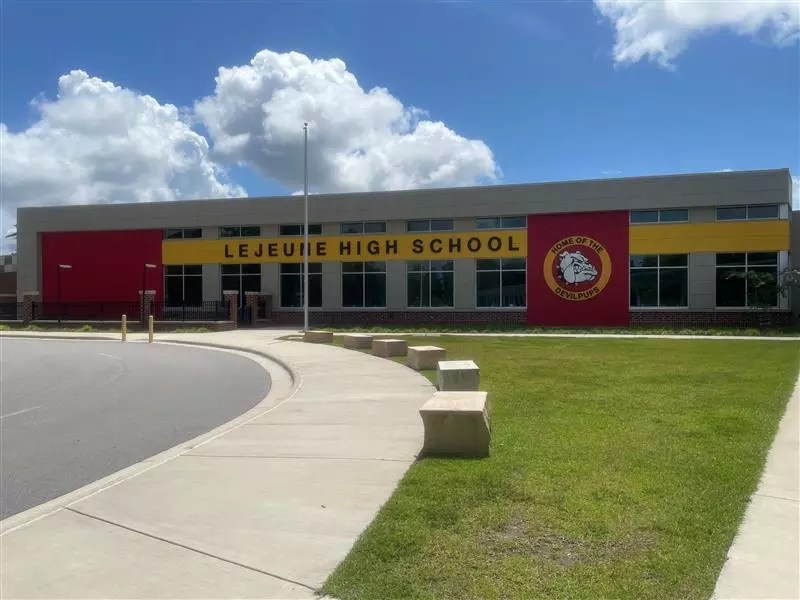
Lejeune High School

The Camp Lejeune Schools, which are part of Department of Defense Education Activity (DoDEA), serve active duty military and DoD civilian families. There are a total of 7 schools, serving students from pre-kindergarten (PK) through grade 12. Residents are zoned to schools based on their housing areas, with zoning as follows:

- Heroes Elementary School (PK-5): Heroes Manor and parts of Berkeley Manor and Paradise Point
- Johnson Primary School (PK-2) and Bitz Intermediate School (grades 3-5): Courthouse Bay, Hospital Point, Watkins Grove, Watkins Village, and parts of Berkeley Manor and Paradise Point
- Tarawa Terrace Elementary School (PK-5): Knox Cove, Knox Landing, Midway Park, and Tarawa Terrace

All residents of Camp Lejeune and of Marine Corps Air Station New River (which has Delalio Elementary (PK-5)) are zoned to Brewster Middle School (grades 6-8) and Lejeune High School (grade 9-12).

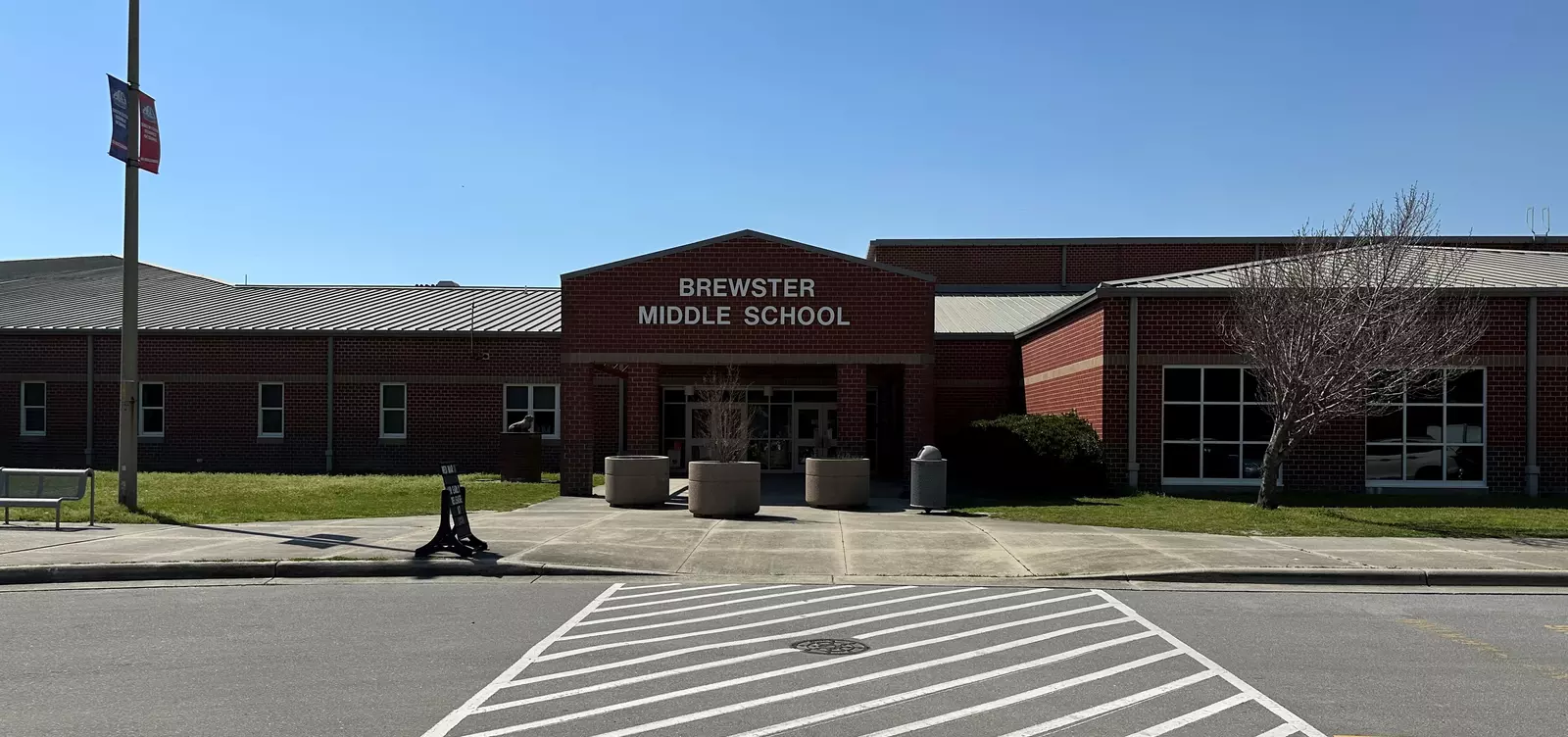
Brewster Middle School

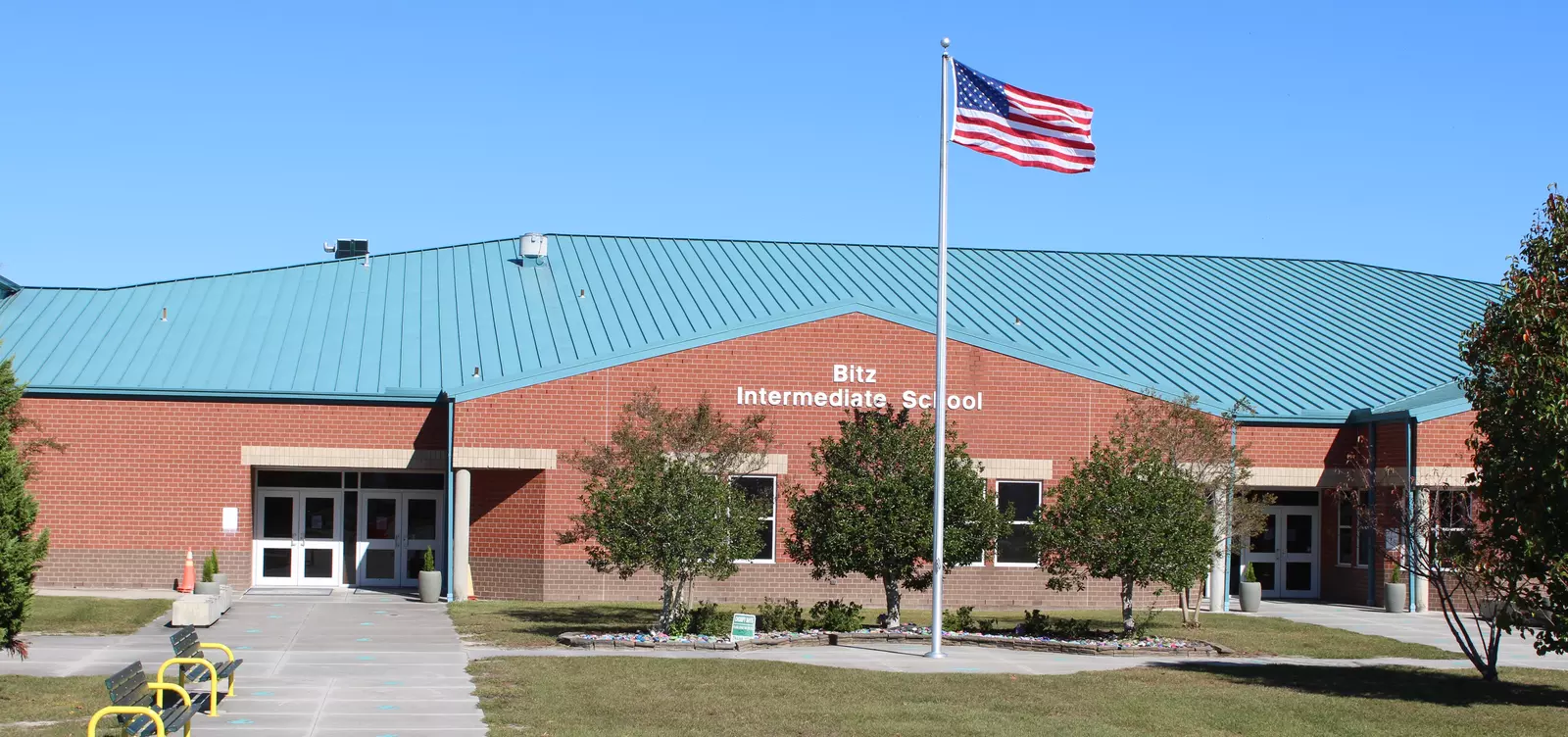
Bitz Intermediate School

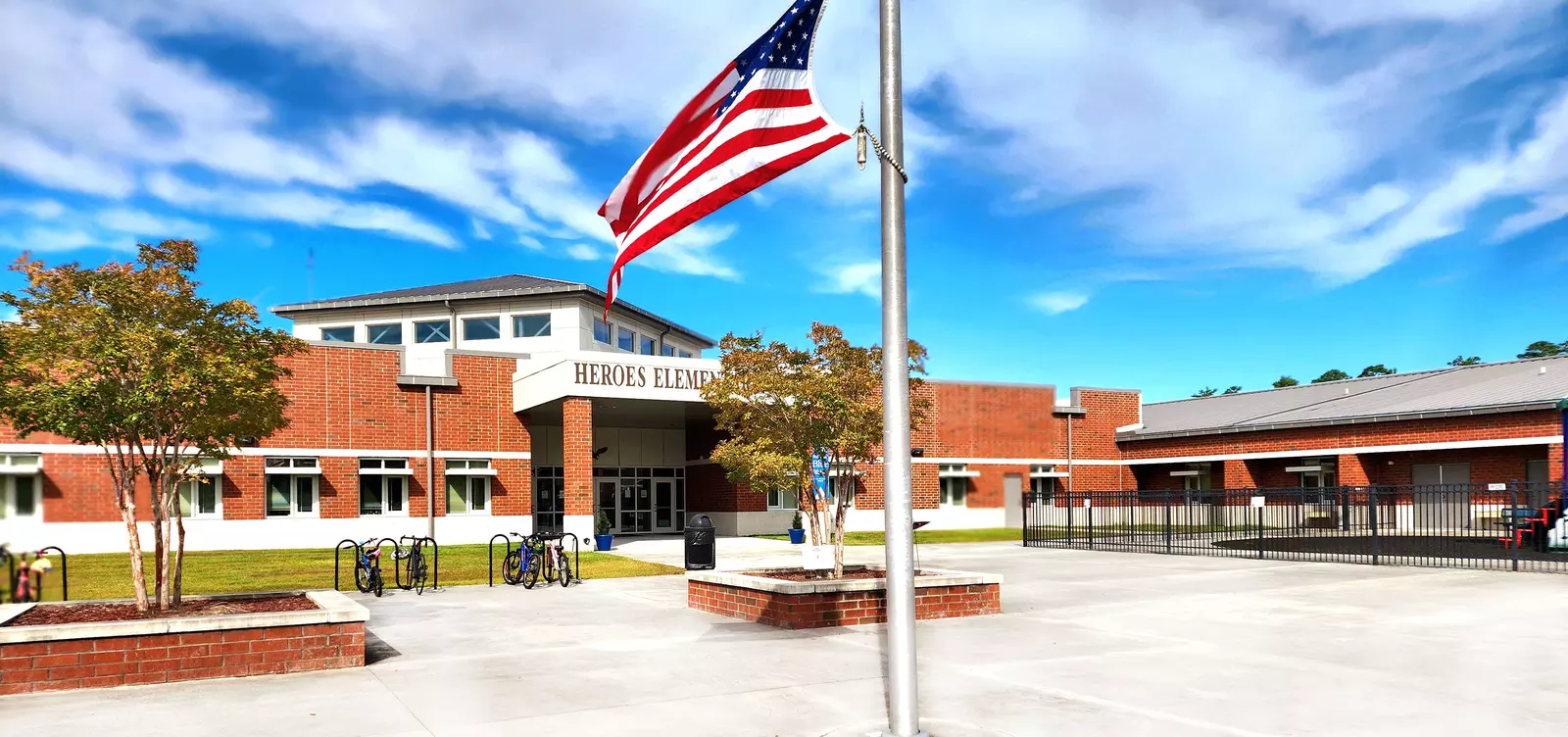
Heroes Elementary School

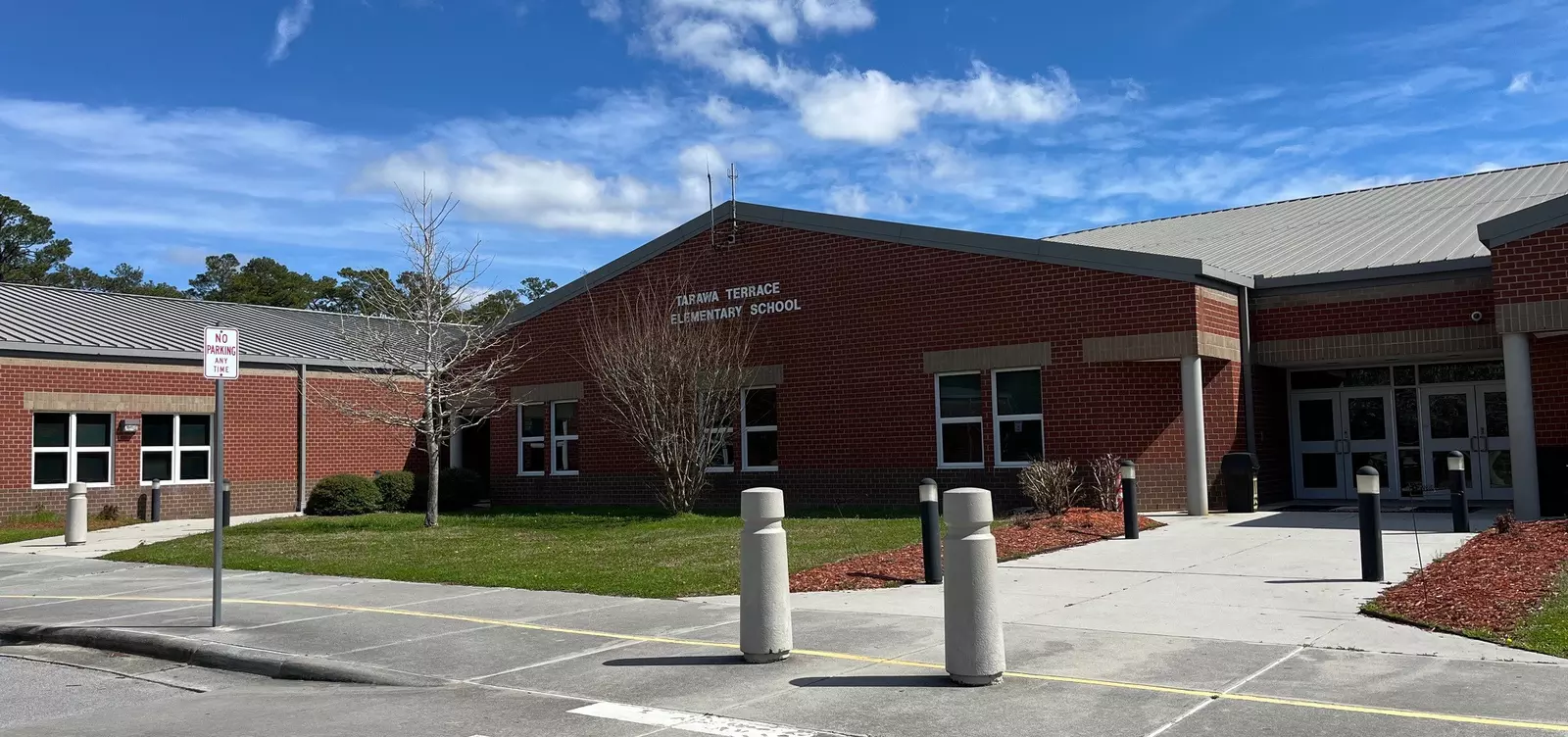
Tarawa Terrace Elementary School

== See also ==
- Camp Lejeune Cell, an Atomwaffen Division cell found on the camp
- Camp Lejeune Incident
- Lejeune High School, located on base, serving military dependents
- List of United States Marine Corps installations
- Marine Corps Air Station New River
- Museum of the Marine
- Murder of Maria Lauterbach, a lance corporal stationed at Camp Lejeune who was murdered in December 2007
