= Courthouse Bay =

US Marine Corps base near Jacksonville, North Carolina, United States

Coordinates: 34°34′49.00″N 77°21′51.10″W

- Jacksonville, North Carolina
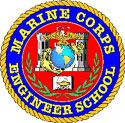
- Marine Corps Engineer School insignia

Site information
- Type: Military base
- Controlled by: United States Marine Corps

Site history
- Built: 1941
- In use: 1941–Present

Garrison information
- Garrison: Marine Corps Engineer School; 2nd Assault Amphibian Battalion

Courthouse Bay is a subdivision of Marine Corps Base Camp Lejeune and is home to the Marine Corps Engineer School, 2nd Combat Engineer Battalion, and the 2nd Assault Amphibian Battalion. Located near Camp Lejeune's southwestern Sneads Ferry gate, the sub-camp is largely self-sufficient, in that it has its own chow hall, post exchange, MWR recreation facilities, and water supply.

The complex was originally used during World War II, however, as a Barrage Balloon School (a history "memorialized" in the continued use of the letters "BB" preceding the numerical designation of buildings here). Because it was far from the main area at Hadnot Point, Courthouse Bay was built as a semi-independent village with its own water supply, recreation facilities, mess hall, barracks, and officers' quarters.

Rumors persist, primarily from Marines in 2nd Combat Engineer Battalion, that odd supernatural occurrences are semi-regular. While this is just here-say, there is allegedly a cemetery from the American colonial era on the premises.
