= Death of Janey Ensminger =

Death caused by contaminated water

Janey Ensminger
- Born: Jane Yoshi Ensminger; July 30, 1976; South Carolina, U.S.
- Died: September 24, 1985 (aged 9); Durham, North Carolina, U.S.
- Cause of death: Acute lymphocytic leukemia caused by contaminated tap water
- Resting place: Indiantown Gap National Cemetery, Annville Township, Pennsylvania, U.S.
- Known for: Janey Ensminger Act
- Parent(s): Etsuko Biederman (mother); Jerry Ensminger (father)
- Relatives: Teriko "Teri" (sister); Jessica (sister)

The death of Janey Ensminger led to the creation of H.R.1742, known as the Janey Ensminger Act, an act of the 112th United States Congress which established a presumption of service connection for illnesses associated with contaminants in the water supply at Marine Corps Base Camp Lejeune between the years 1957 and 1987 and which provided healthcare to family members of veterans who lived at Camp Lejeune while the water was contaminated. Ensminger was one among thousands of victims of the Camp Lejeune water contamination scandal, which is believed to be one of the largest water contamination incidents in United States history.

== Life of Janey Ensminger ==
Etsuko and Jerry Ensminger welcomed Jane "Janey" Yoshi Ensminger into the world on July 30, 1976 in South Carolina. Her father is American, while her mother is Japanese.

She was the only one of the Ensmingers’ children to have been conceived, carried or born while the family was living at Camp Lejeune.

Janey was diagnosed with leukemia in 1983 and was the only child in the entire family’s known history to have been diagnosed with cancer. She was subjected to many bone marrow extractions and spinal taps, fighting the cancer for nearly 2½ years before succumbing to it. Right after her death, her parents divorced.

== H.R. 1742 ==
H.R. 1742 was introduced into Congress by U.S. Representative Brad Miller on May 5, 2011. It was the result of Jerry Ensminger's conviction that Janey's leukemia was caused by toxic chemicals in the drinking water at Camp Lejeune, which Jerry did not know about until 1997, when a federal government report concluded that for nearly three decades the tap water at Camp Lejeune had been contaminated by toxic chemicals associated with childhood and adult cancers, especially leukemia.

President Barack Obama signed the bill into law in 2012, saying at the White House ceremony that the country has a “moral and sacred duty” to care for those sickened by the contaminated drinking water.
