= Gilbert Patterson =

Gilbert Patterson may refer to:

- Gilbert B. Patterson (1863–1922), American politician
- Gilbert E. Patterson (1939–2007), American minister
