= Senator Bellamy =

Senator Bellamy may refer to:

- Carol Bellamy (born 1942), New York State Senate
- John Dillard Bellamy (1854–1942), North Carolina State Senate
