= John D. Bellamy =

American politician (1854–1942)

John Dillard Bellamy
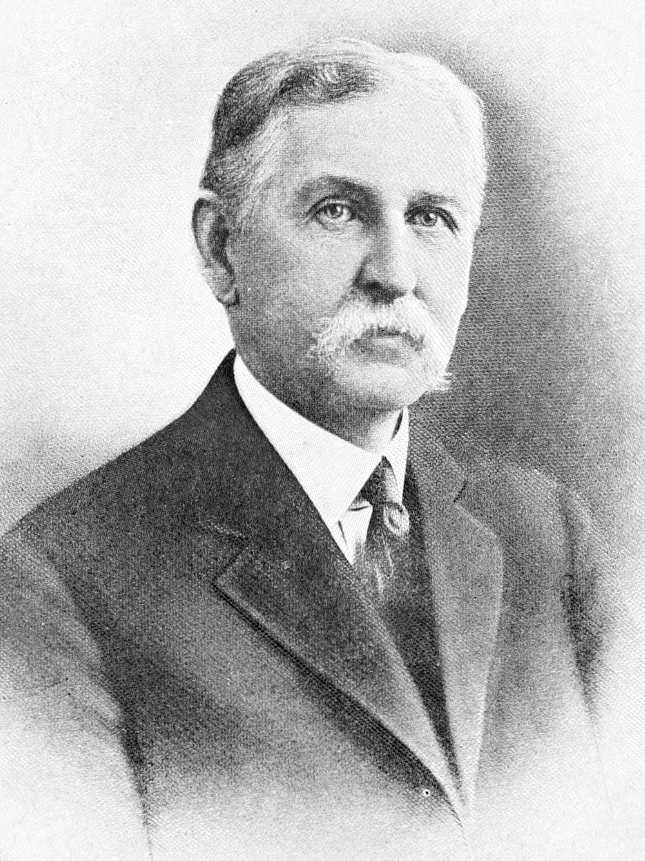

Member of the U.S. House of Representatives from North Carolina's 6th district
- In office March 4, 1899 – March 3, 1903
- Preceded by: Charles H. Martin
- Succeeded by: Gilbert B. Patterson

Personal details
- Born: John Dillard Bellamy Jr. March 24, 1854 Wilmington, North Carolina
- Died: September 25, 1942 (aged 88) Wilmington, North Carolina
- Party: Democratic
- Spouse: Emma May Hargrove
- Education: University of Virginia
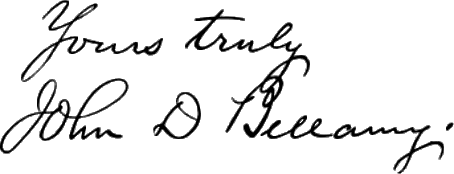
- Signature

John Dillard Bellamy Jr. (March 24, 1854 – September 25, 1942) was a Democratic U.S. Congressman from North Carolina from 1899 to 1903, elected in the wake of the Wilmington massacre, in which he was identified as one of the leaders of a mob who destroyed black property. He was close to the North Carolina Red Shirts in their campaign against local newspaper editor Alex Manly. He also served as a member of the North Carolina Senate from 1891 to 1892.

== Biography ==
=== Early life ===
Born in Wilmington, North Carolina to one of the area's richest men, Bellamy was a close friend of future President Woodrow Wilson as a young man. Bellamy attended local common schools, the Cape Fear Military Academy, Davidson College, graduating in 1873, and finally the University of Virginia at Charlottesville, graduating in 1875. He was admitted to the bar in 1875 and practiced law in Wilmington, where he was city attorney from 1892 to 1894.

Due to the influence the Bellamy family had in Wilmington, Bellamy quickly rose to powerful positions in the city. In February 1889, Bellamy was elected to the board of directors of the Chamber of Industry and in March he was elected vice president. Bellamy was also elected director to the Bellevue Cemetery Company, President of the Industrial Manufacturing Company, Chairman to the New Hanover County Democratic Executive Committee, Chairman to the Third Ward, and was a member of The Rightworthy Grand Lodge of the Independent Order of Odd Fellows of North Carolina representing Cape Fear Lodge No. 2; F.

=== NC State Senate ===
Bellamy was on the County Democratic ticket for North Carolina Senate representing New Hanover and Pender Counties in 1891. Bellamy ran on a platform supporting the agricultural and laboring classes and equal rights and laws. During his time in the 1891 North Carolina State Senate Bellamy was on the Judiciary Committee, Education Committee, Salaries and Fees Committee, Penal Institutions Committee, Public Buildings and Grounds Committee, Military Affairs Committee, and was the Chairman of Corporations.

One of the bills that Bellamy supported in his time in the North Carolina State Senate was SB12, the founding of The Agricultural and Mechanical College for the Colored Race (known today as the North Carolina Agricultural and Technical State University). The North Carolina General Assembly was threatened with losing federal funding via the Morrill Acts if they did not found a higher education institute for Black North Carolinian's and shortly thereafter Bellamy introduced SB12. In Bellamy's 1942 autobiography, Memoirs of an Octogenarian, which he wrote during his last year of life, he boasted that, "many other bills...were passed" during his time in the General Assembly, but he only went into detail about his role in establishing A&T University explaining he "drafted the charter for the Negro Agricultural College at Greensboro." Bellamy never explicitly stated why he suddenly supported SB12; if he was taking it on because he truly believed in a need for a Black college or if he was simply supporting it to secure federal funding for other colleges, but it is most likely at the intersection of myriad reasons he chose to support SB12.

=== Wilmington massacre participation and Red Shirt associations ===
In 1898, he participated in the Wilmington massacre. He and others forced Wilmington's elected mayor, aldermen and chief of police to resign.

Bellamy was elected as a Democrat to the 56th United States Congress in 1898, amid widespread voter fraud and intimidation of black voters that accompanied the Wilmington massacre of 1898. Wilmington lawyer William Henderson was one of many targeted in the insurrection and wrote of Bellamy: "[He] walks cheerfully to his seat over broken homes, broken hearts, disappointed lives, dead husbands and fathers, the trampled rights of freedmen and not one word of condemnation is heard." A letter by an African-American on November 13, 1898 identifies Bellamy as one of the leaders of a street mob that had destroyed much property in the African-American part of town three days earlier.

His election was contested by Oliver H. Dockery. But the appeal was unsuccessful.

Before the election Bellamy met in his office a group of Red Shirts, a "paramilitary arm of the Democratic Party" who sought to further dissuade black voting and to this end were planning to lynch the editor of the Wilmington Daily Record. There they were welcomed and "enjoyed a drink". Bellamy dissuaded the lynching plan but favoured punitive measures against the publication for its writing on interracial relationships. When Manly was forced to flee the town before the election, Bellamy declared "Wilmington has been rid of the vilest slanderer in North Carolina."

=== Later years ===
Bellamy was re-elected to the U.S. Congress, serving until 1903. He was unsuccessful in gaining a third term. Bellamy was also a delegate to the 1892, 1908, and 1920 Democratic National Conventions.

After leaving Congress, he returned to his law practice in Wilmington. Among his clients were the Seaboard Air Line Railway, the Southern Bell Telephone Co., and the Western Union Telegraph Co. In 1932, Governor Angus McLean appointed him a commissioner from North Carolina to the celebration of the two-hundredth anniversary of the birth of George Washington. Bellamy died in Wilmington in 1942.

Bellamy published Memoirs of an Octogenarian in 1942; this self-published memoir has become a valuable primary source for historians studying late nineteenth-century North Carolina history, politics, and law, and in particular the Wilmington massacre of 1898.

== See also ==
- Bellamy Mansion

== Bibliography ==
- Zucchino, David (2020). Wilmington's Lie: The Murderous Coup of 1898 and the Rise of White Supremacy. Atlantic Monthly Press. ISBN 9780802128386.

U.S. House of Representatives
Preceded by Charles H. Martin	Member of the U.S. House of Representatives from North Carolina's 6th congressional district 1899–1903	Succeeded by Gilbert B. Patterson
