= Charles H. Martin (North Carolina politician) =

American politician

Member of the U.S. House of Representatives from North Carolina's 6th district
- In office June 5, 1896 – March 3, 1899
- Preceded by: James A. Lockhart
- Succeeded by: John D. Bellamy

Personal details
- Born: Charles Henry Martin; August 28, 1848 near Youngsville, North Carolina
- Died: April 19, 1931 (aged 82) Polkton, North Carolina
- Party: Populist
- Education: University of Virginia; Southern Baptist Theological Seminary
- Occupation: Educator, lawyer, minister

Charles Henry Martin (August 28, 1848 – April 19, 1931) was a United States representative from North Carolina. Martin was born near Youngsville, Franklin County, N.C., on August 28, 1848. He attended the common schools and the preparatory department of Wake Forest College, graduating from Wake Forest in 1872 and from the University of Virginia at Charlottesville in 1875. He later studied at the Southern Baptist Theological Seminary in Louisville, Kentucky.

Martin worked as a principal of the high schools at Badin and Lumberton, North Carolina, and was a professor of Latin at a female college at Murfreesboro, North Carolina, and later taught at Wake Forest College. He was admitted to the bar in 1879, practicing law in Louisburg and later in Raleigh. Martin was ordained as a Baptist minister in 1887.

Martin moved to Polkton, North Carolina, after marrying Mary Williams, who was from that area. There, he ran against Democrat James A. Lockhart for Congress (6th District) as a Populist in 1894. After Lockhart was at first declared the winner, Martin successfully contested the election and was seated by the House during the Fifty-fourth Congress. He was reelected to the Fifty-fifth Congress and served from June 5, 1896, to March 3, 1899. Martin did not seek renomination in 1898 and resumed his ministerial duties at Polkton, where he died on April 19, 1931.

His great-grandfather was Nathaniel Macon.

U.S. House of Representatives
Preceded by James A. Lockhart	Member of the U.S. House of Representatives from North Carolina's 6th congressional district 1896–1899	Succeeded by John D. Bellamy
