= North Carolina's 6th congressional district =

U.S. House district for North Carolina

Coordinates: 36.26°N 79.69°W

- Interactive map of district boundaries since January 3, 2025 (Note: As the mid-decade redistricting bill (S249) enacted on October 22, 2025 only changed the compositions of North Carolina's 1st and 3rd congressional districts, boundaries of other districts will not change at the 2026 elections.)
- Representative: Addison McDowell; R–Bermuda Run
- Population (2025): 799,488
- Median household income: $74,292
- Ethnicity: 62.5% White; 18.4% Black; 10.8% Hispanic; 3.8% Two or more races; 3.6% Asian; 0.8% other
- Cook PVI: R+9

North Carolina's 6th congressional district is a congressional district located in the north central portion of the U.S state of North Carolina. All of Davidson, Davie, and Rowan counties are located in the district, along with portions of Cabarrus, Forsyth, and Guilford counties including small portions of Greensboro, and Winston-Salem. On October 25, 2023, the North Carolina General Assembly approved a new congressional map shifting the district's Cook Partisan Voting Index from D+4 to R+9. It is currently represented by Republican Addison McDowell.

== History ==
From 2003 to 2013 the 6th district comprised all of Moore and Randolph counties and portions of Alamance, Davidson, Guilford, and Rowan counties. Until court-mandated redistricting in 2019, the district included the entirety of Alamance County, Caswell County, Chatham County, Lee County, Person County, Randolph County, and, Rockingham County, as well as portions of Guilford County.

After congressional reapportionment following the 2010 census, the district was shifted northward by the North Carolina General Assembly. From then until 2017, it included portions of Guilford, Alamance, Durham, Granville, and Orange counties, and all of Caswell, Person, Rockingham, Surry, and Stokes counties. In 2015, it was reconfigured again but remained in the same general region.

As a result of court-mandated redistricting in 2019, it was shifted into the central Triad region and contained all of Guilford County, all of Rockingham County, most of Caswell County, and a portion of Forsyth County. The cities of Greensboro, Winston-Salem, and High Point were located in the district until 2022.

The district was represented by Mark Walker, a Republican, from 2015 until 2021. In December 2019, Walker announced that he would not run for re-election in 2020.

On February 23, 2022, the North Carolina Supreme Court approved a new map only used for the 2022 United States House of Representatives elections in North Carolina which changed the 6th district boundaries to also include Caswell and Rockingham Counties.

Prior to 2022 redistricting the 6th district included all of Guilford County and part of Forsyth.

== Counties and communities ==
For the 119th and successive Congresses (based on the districts drawn following a 2023 legislative session), the district contains all or portions of the following counties and communities.

Cabarrus County (2)

Concord (part; also 8th), Kannapolis (part; also 8th; shared with Rowan County)

Davidson County (10)

All ten communities

Davie County (5)

All five communities

Forsyth County (4)

Clemmons (part; also 10th), Kernersville (part; also 5th; shared with Guilford County), Walkertown (part; also 10th), Winston-Salem (part; also 10th)

Guilford County (5)

Archdale (part; also 9th; shared with Randolph County), Greensboro (part; also 5th and 9th), High Point (part; also 9th; shared with Davidson, Forsyth, and Randolph counties), Jamestown (part; also 9th), Kernersville (part; also 5th; shared with Forsyth County)

Rowan County (12)

All 12 communities

== Recent election results from statewide races ==
Year	Office	Results
2008	President	McCain 56% - 43%
2008	Senate	Dole 50% - 47%
2008	Governor	McCrory 53% - 43%
2010	Senate	Burr 63% - 34%
2012	President	Romney 58% - 42%
2012	Governor	McCrory 63% - 35%
2014	Senate	Tillis 57% - 39%
2016	President	Trump 58% - 38%
2016	Senate	Burr 58% - 37%
2016	Governor	McCrory 55% - 42%
2016	Lt. Governor	Forest 59% - 38%
2016	Secretary of State	LaPaglia 56% - 44%
2016	Auditor	Stuber 58% - 42%
2016	Treasurer	Folwell 61% - 39%
2016	Attorney General	Newton 57% - 43%
2020	President	Trump 57% - 41%
2020	Senate	Tillis 55% - 40%
2020	Governor	Forest 54% - 45%
2020	Lt. Governor	Robinson 59% - 41%
2020	Secretary of State	Sykes 56% - 44%
2020	Auditor	Street 57% - 43%
2020	Treasurer	Folwell 59% - 41%
2020	Attorney General	O'Neill 57% - 43%
2022	Senate	Budd 59% - 39%
2024	President	Trump 58% - 41%
2024	Governor	Stein 49% - 46%
2024	Lt. Governor	Weatherman 54% - 43%
2024	Secretary of State	Brown 56% - 44%
2024	Auditor	Boliek 56% - 41%
2024	Treasurer	Briner 59% - 41%
2024	Attorney General	Bishop 55% - 45%

== List of members representing the district ==
Member (Residence)	Party	Years	Cong ress	Electoral history	District location
District established March 4, 1793
James Gillespie (Kenansville)	Anti-Administration	March 4, 1793 – March 3, 1795	3rd 4th 5th	Elected in 1793. Re-elected in 1795. Re-elected in 1796. Lost re-election.	
James Gillespie (Kenansville)	Democratic-Republican	March 4, 1795 – March 3, 1799	3rd 4th 5th	Elected in 1793. Re-elected in 1795. Re-elected in 1796. Lost re-election.	
William H. Hill (Wilmington)	Federalist	March 4, 1799 – March 3, 1803	6th 7th	Elected in 1798. Re-elected in 1800. [data missing]	
Nathaniel Macon (Warrenton)	Democratic-Republican	March 4, 1803 – December 13, 1815	8th 9th 10th 11th 12th 13th 14th	Redistricted from the 5th district and re-elected in 1803. Re-elected in 1804. Re-elected in 1806. Re-elected in 1808. Re-elected in 1810. Re-elected in 1813. Re-elected in 1815. Resigned when elected U.S. senator.	1803–1813 "North Carolina congressional district map (1803–13)".
Vacant		December 13, 1815 – February 7, 1816	14th		1813–1843 "North Carolina congressional district map (1813–43)".
Weldon N. Edwards (Warrenton)	Democratic-Republican (Note: Supported the Crawford faction in the 1824 United States presidential election.)	February 7, 1816 – March 3, 1825	14th 15th 16th 17th 18th 19th	Elected to finish Macon's term. Re-elected in 1817. Re-elected in 1819. Re-elected in 1821. Re-elected in 1823. Re-elected in 1825. Retired.	1813–1843 "North Carolina congressional district map (1813–43)".
Weldon N. Edwards (Warrenton)	Jacksonian	March 4, 1825 – March 3, 1827	14th 15th 16th 17th 18th 19th	Elected to finish Macon's term. Re-elected in 1817. Re-elected in 1819. Re-elected in 1821. Re-elected in 1823. Re-elected in 1825. Retired.	1813–1843 "North Carolina congressional district map (1813–43)".
Daniel Turner (Warrenton)	Jacksonian	March 4, 1827 – March 3, 1829	20th	Elected in 1827. Retired.	1813–1843 "North Carolina congressional district map (1813–43)".
Robert Potter (Oxford)	Jacksonian	March 4, 1829 – November 1831	21st 22nd	Elected in 1829. Resigned.	1813–1843 "North Carolina congressional district map (1813–43)".
Vacant		November 1831 – December 15, 1831	22nd		1813–1843 "North Carolina congressional district map (1813–43)".
Micajah T. Hawkins (Warrenton)	Jacksonian	December 15, 1831 – March 3, 1837	22nd 23rd 24th 25th 26th	Elected to finish Potter's term. Re-elected in 1831. Re-elected in 1833. Re-elected in 1835. Re-elected in 1837. Re-elected in 1839. [data missing]	1813–1843 "North Carolina congressional district map (1813–43)".
Micajah T. Hawkins (Warrenton)	Democratic	March 4, 1837 – March 3, 1841	22nd 23rd 24th 25th 26th	Elected to finish Potter's term. Re-elected in 1831. Re-elected in 1833. Re-elected in 1835. Re-elected in 1837. Re-elected in 1839. [data missing]	1813–1843 "North Carolina congressional district map (1813–43)".
Archibald H. Arrington (Hilliardston)	Democratic	March 4, 1841 – March 3, 1843	27th	Elected in 1841. Redistricted to the 8th district.	1813–1843 "North Carolina congressional district map (1813–43)".
James I. McKay (Elizabethtown)	Democratic	March 4, 1843 – March 3, 1847	28th 29th	Redistricted from the 5th district and re-elected in 1843. Re-elected in 1845. Redistricted to the 7th district.	
John R. J. Daniel (Halifax)	Democratic	March 4, 1847 – March 3, 1853	30th 31st 32nd	Redistricted from the 7th district and re-elected in 1847. Re-elected in 1849. Re-elected in 1851. [data missing]	
Richard C. Puryear (Huntsville)	Whig	March 4, 1853 – March 3, 1855	33rd 34th	Elected in 1853. Re-elected in 1855. [data missing]	
Richard C. Puryear (Huntsville)	Know Nothing	March 4, 1855 – March 3, 1857	33rd 34th	Elected in 1853. Re-elected in 1855. [data missing]	
Alfred M. Scales (Madison)	Democratic	March 4, 1857 – March 3, 1859	35th	Elected in 1857. [data missing]	
James M. Leach (Lexington)	Opposition	March 4, 1859 – March 3, 1861	36th	Elected in 1859. [data missing]	
Vacant		March 3, 1861 – July 20, 1868	37th 38th 39th 40th	Civil War and Reconstruction	
Nathaniel Boyden (Salisbury)	Conservative	July 13, 1868 – March 3, 1869	40th	Elected to finish the short term. [data missing]	
Francis E. Shober (Salisbury)	Democratic	March 4, 1869 – March 3, 1873	41st 42nd	Elected in 1868. Re-elected in 1870. [data missing]	
Thomas S. Ashe (Wadesboro)	Democratic	March 4, 1873 – March 3, 1877	43rd 44th	Elected in 1872. Re-elected in 1874. [data missing]	
Walter L. Steele (Rockingham)	Democratic	March 4, 1877 – March 3, 1881	45th 46th	Elected in 1876. Re-elected in 1878. [data missing]	
Clement Dowd (Charlotte)	Democratic	March 4, 1881 – March 3, 1885	47th 48th	Elected in 1880. Re-elected in 1882. [data missing]	
Risden T. Bennett (Wadesboro)	Democratic	March 4, 1885 – March 3, 1887	49th	Redistricted from the At-large district and re-elected in 1884. [data missing]	
Alfred Rowland (Lumberton)	Democratic	March 4, 1887 – March 3, 1891	50th 51st	Elected in 1886. Re-elected in 1888. [data missing]	
Sydenham B. Alexander (Charlotte)	Democratic	March 4, 1891 – March 3, 1895	52nd 53rd	Elected in 1890. Re-elected in 1892. [data missing]	
James A. Lockhart (Wadesboro)	Democratic	March 4, 1895 – June 5, 1896	54th	Lost contested election.	
Charles H. Martin (Polkton)	Populist	June 5, 1896 – March 3, 1899	54th 55th	Won contested election. Re-elected in 1896. [data missing]	
John D. Bellamy (Wilmington)	Democratic	March 4, 1899 – March 3, 1903	56th 57th	Elected in 1898. Re-elected in 1900. [data missing]	
Gilbert B. Patterson (Maxton)	Democratic	March 4, 1903 – March 3, 1907	58th 59th	Elected in 1902. Re-elected in 1904. [data missing]	
Hannibal L. Godwin (Dunn)	Democratic	March 4, 1907 – March 3, 1921	60th 61st 62nd 63rd 64th 65th 66th	Elected in 1906. Re-elected in 1908. Re-elected in 1910. Re-elected in 1912. Re-elected in 1914. Re-elected in 1916. Re-elected in 1918. [data missing]	
Homer L. Lyon (Whiteville)	Democratic	March 4, 1921 – March 3, 1929	67th 68th 69th 70th	Elected in 1920. Re-elected in 1922. Re-elected in 1924. Re-elected in 1926. [data missing]	
J. Bayard Clark (Fayetteville)	Democratic	March 4, 1929 – March 3, 1933	71st 72nd	Elected in 1928. Re-elected in 1930. Redistricted to the 7th district.	
William B. Umstead (Durham)	Democratic	March 4, 1933 – January 3, 1939	73rd 74th 75th	Elected in 1932. Re-elected in 1934. Re-elected in 1936. Retired.	
Carl T. Durham (Chapel Hill)	Democratic	January 3, 1939 – January 3, 1961	76th 77th 78th 79th 80th 81st 82nd 83rd 84th 85th 86th	Elected in 1938. Re-elected in 1940. Re-elected in 1942. Re-elected in 1944. Re-elected in 1946. Re-elected in 1948. Re-elected in 1950. Re-elected in 1952. Re-elected in 1954. Re-elected in 1956. Re-elected in 1958. Retired.	
Horace R. Kornegay (Greensboro)	Democratic	January 3, 1961 – January 3, 1969	87th 88th 89th 90th	Elected in 1960. Re-elected in 1962. Re-elected in 1964. Re-elected in 1966. Retired.	
L. Richardson Preyer (Greensboro)	Democratic	January 3, 1969 – January 3, 1981	91st 92nd 93rd 94th 95th 96th	Elected in 1968. Re-elected in 1970. Re-elected in 1972. Re-elected in 1974. Re-elected in 1976. Re-elected in 1978. Lost re-election.	
Walter E. Johnston, III (Greensboro)	Republican	January 3, 1981 – January 3, 1983	97th	Elected in 1980. Lost re-election.	
Robin Britt (Greensboro)	Democratic	January 3, 1983 – January 3, 1985	98th	Elected in 1982. Lost re-election.	1983–1993 [data missing]
Howard Coble (Greensboro)	Republican	January 3, 1985 – January 3, 2015	99th 100th 101st 102nd 103rd 104th 105th 106th 107th 108th 109th 110th 111th 112th 113th	Elected in 1984. Re-elected in 1986. Re-elected in 1988. Re-elected in 1990. Re-elected in 1992. Re-elected in 1994. Re-elected in 1996. Re-elected in 1998. Re-elected in 2000. Re-elected in 2002. Re-elected in 2004. Re-elected in 2006. Re-elected in 2008. Re-elected in 2010. Re-elected in 2012. Retired.	1983–1993 [data missing]
Howard Coble (Greensboro)	Republican	January 3, 1985 – January 3, 2015	99th 100th 101st 102nd 103rd 104th 105th 106th 107th 108th 109th 110th 111th 112th 113th	Elected in 1984. Re-elected in 1986. Re-elected in 1988. Re-elected in 1990. Re-elected in 1992. Re-elected in 1994. Re-elected in 1996. Re-elected in 1998. Re-elected in 2000. Re-elected in 2002. Re-elected in 2004. Re-elected in 2006. Re-elected in 2008. Re-elected in 2010. Re-elected in 2012. Retired.	1993–2003 [data missing]
Howard Coble (Greensboro)	Republican	January 3, 1985 – January 3, 2015	99th 100th 101st 102nd 103rd 104th 105th 106th 107th 108th 109th 110th 111th 112th 113th	Elected in 1984. Re-elected in 1986. Re-elected in 1988. Re-elected in 1990. Re-elected in 1992. Re-elected in 1994. Re-elected in 1996. Re-elected in 1998. Re-elected in 2000. Re-elected in 2002. Re-elected in 2004. Re-elected in 2006. Re-elected in 2008. Re-elected in 2010. Re-elected in 2012. Retired.	2003–2013 2003-2013
Howard Coble (Greensboro)	Republican	January 3, 1985 – January 3, 2015	99th 100th 101st 102nd 103rd 104th 105th 106th 107th 108th 109th 110th 111th 112th 113th	Elected in 1984. Re-elected in 1986. Re-elected in 1988. Re-elected in 1990. Re-elected in 1992. Re-elected in 1994. Re-elected in 1996. Re-elected in 1998. Re-elected in 2000. Re-elected in 2002. Re-elected in 2004. Re-elected in 2006. Re-elected in 2008. Re-elected in 2010. Re-elected in 2012. Retired.	2013–2017 2013-2017
Mark Walker (Summerfield)	Republican	January 3, 2015 – January 3, 2021	114th 115th 116th	Elected in 2014. Re-elected in 2016. Re-elected in 2018. Retired.	2013–2017 2013-2017
Mark Walker (Summerfield)	Republican	January 3, 2015 – January 3, 2021	114th 115th 116th	Elected in 2014. Re-elected in 2016. Re-elected in 2018. Retired.	2017–2021
Kathy Manning (Greensboro)	Democratic	January 3, 2021 – January 3, 2025	117th 118th	Elected in 2020. Re-elected in 2022. Redistricted to the 5th district and retired.	2021–2023 2021-2023
Kathy Manning (Greensboro)	Democratic	January 3, 2021 – January 3, 2025	117th 118th	Elected in 2020. Re-elected in 2022. Redistricted to the 5th district and retired.	2023–2025
Addison McDowell (Bermuda Run)	Republican	January 3, 2025 – present	119th	Elected in 2024. Lost re-election.	2025–present
Cyril Jefferson (High Point)	Democratic	Taking office on January 3, 2027		Elected in 2026.	

== Past election results ==
=== 2012 ===
2012 North Carolina's 6th congressional district election
Party	Candidate	Votes	%
Republican	Howard Coble (incumbent)	222,116	60.9
Democratic	Anthony Foriest	142,467	39.1
Total votes		364,583	100.0
Republican hold			

=== 2014 ===
2014 North Carolina's 6th congressional district election
Party	Candidate	Votes	%
Republican	Mark Walker	147,312	58.7
Democratic	Laura Fjeld	103,758	41.3
Total votes		251,070	100.0
Republican hold			

=== 2016 ===
2016 North Carolina's 6th congressional district election
Party	Candidate	Votes	%
Republican	Mark Walker (incumbent)	207,983	59.2
Democratic	Pete Glidewell	143,167	40.8
Total votes		351,150	100.0
Republican hold			

=== 2018 ===
2018 North Carolina's 6th congressional district election
Party	Candidate	Votes	%
Republican	Mark Walker (incumbent)	160,709	56.5
Democratic	Ryan Watts	123,651	43.5
Total votes		284,360	100.0
Republican hold			

=== 2020 ===
2020 North Carolina's 6th congressional district election
Party	Candidate	Votes	%
Democratic	Kathy Manning	253,531	62.3
Republican	Lee Haywood	153,598	37.7
Total votes		407,129	100.0
Democratic gain from Republican			

=== 2022 ===
2022 North Carolina's 6th congressional district election
Party	Candidate	Votes	%
Democratic	Kathy Manning (incumbent)	139,553	53.88%
Republican	Christian Castelli	116,635	45.03%
Libertarian	Thomas Watercott	2,810	1.09%
Total votes		256,950	100%
Democratic hold			

=== 2024 ===
2024 North Carolina's 6th congressional district election
Party	Candidate	Votes	%
Republican	Addison McDowell	233,303	69.2
Constitution	Kevin Hayes	104,017	30.8
Total votes		337,320	100.0
Republican gain from Democratic			

== See also ==
- List of United States congressional districts
- North Carolina's congressional districts
