= Risden Tyler Bennett =

American politician (1840–1913)

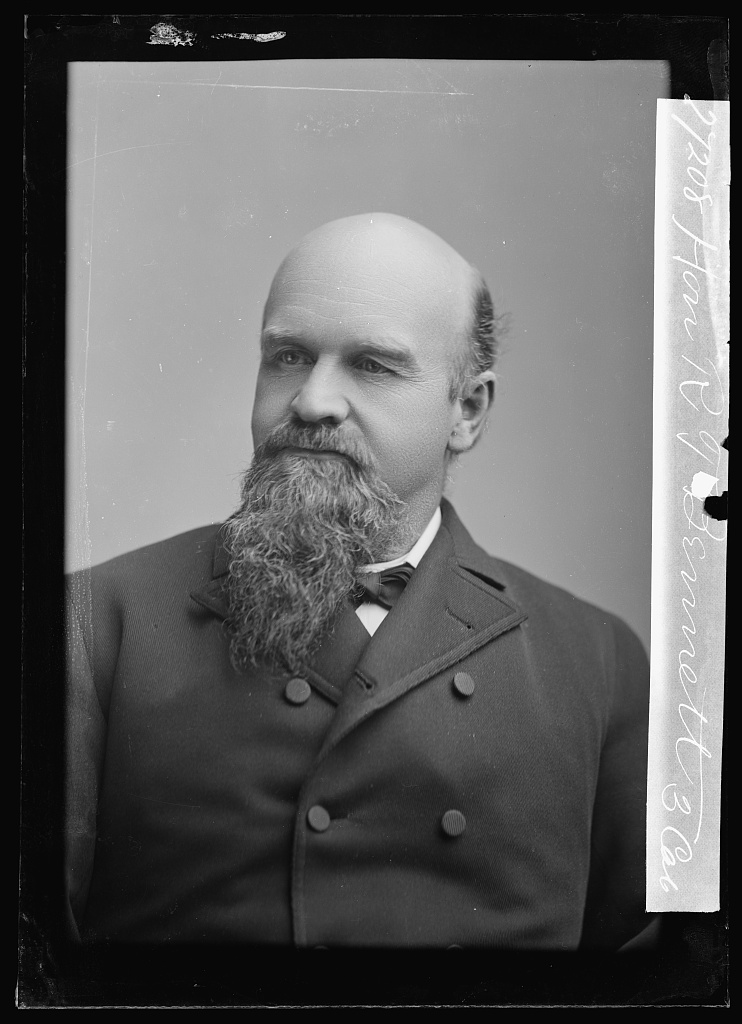
- Bennett, photograph by C. M. Bell

Member of the U.S. House of Representatives from North Carolina
- In office March 4, 1883 – March 3, 1887
- Preceded by: District established
- Succeeded by: Alfred Rowland
- Constituency: At-large district (1883–1885); 6th district (1885–1887)

North Carolina Superior Court
- In office 1880–1882

North Carolina House of Representatives
- In office 1872–1874

Personal details
- Born: June 18, 1840 Wadesboro, North Carolina, USA
- Died: July 21, 1913 (aged 73) Wadesboro, North Carolina, USA
- Party: Democrat
- Education: Davidson College; Cumberland University; University of North Carolina at Chapel Hill
- Profession: Attorney

Risden Tyler Bennett (June 18, 1840 – July 21, 1913) was a Democratic U.S. congressman from North Carolina between 1883 and 1887. He was also an attorney and judge.

== Early life ==
Bennett was born in Wadesboro, North Carolina. He was the twelfth and youngest child of Catherine Harris and Nevil Bennett, a farmer and primitive Baptist minister. His father died when Bennett was twelve–years–old.

He attended common schools and the Gouldsfork Academy. He graduated from the Anson Institute in Wadesboro. He enrolled in the sophomore class of University of North Carolina at Chapel Hill when he was sixteen years old, but soon left over hazing and headed West where he saw the Rocky Mountains and lived with Native Americans. However, his guardian George W. Little required him to come back East.

In 1859, he attended Davidson College. In the winter of 1858-9, he enrolled in the law school at Cumberland University, where he was a member of the Fraternity of Delta Psi (St. Anthony Hall). He graduated in 1859.

On April 30, 1861, he enlisted in the Confederate Army as a private in the Anson Guards. He rose to the rank of colonel of the 14th North Carolina on July 5, 1862. He was wounded three times, including at the Battle of Gettysburg in July 1863. He was captured at Winchester, Virginia and was a prisoner on parole until February 28, 1864.

== Career ==
Bennett became an attorney at law in the Court of Common Pleas in Anson County, North Carolina in January 1860. After the Civil War, he joined a law practice with Judge Thomas Samuel Ashe. He was also the county solicitor of Anson County, North Carolina from 1866 and 1867.

In 1870, he was nominated for Congress but declined the nomination because of poor health. In 1871, he was elected to the North Carolina House of Representatives, serving from 1872 to 1874. He declined to run for reelection. In 1875, he was a delegate to the Constitutional Convention, serving as chairman of the Judicial Department. He was appointed to fill a vacancy on the North Carolina Superior Court in 1880, serving for two years until he resigned to serve in Congress.

In 1882, he was elected to the United States Congress in a unique at-large (statewide) election. He was re-elected in 1884. During his second term, Bennett chaired the committee on expenditures in the Department of State. However, he declined to run for reelection.

After leaving Congress, Bennett practiced law in Wadesboro, North Carolina. He was also an orator and wrote articles for the Charlotte and Wadesboro newspapers.

== Personal life ==
Bennett married Kate Shepperd on August 26, 1863, while he was at home recovering from his wounds during the Civil War. They had two sons who died in infancy and three daughters, Mary, Effie, and Kate.

Although raised a Baptist, he was baptized by a Methodist chaplain during the Civil War. Later in life, he joined the Episcopal Church. He donated a collection of a thousand books to start a library in Wadesboro.

While at the Constitutional Convention in 1875, Bennett suffered from sciatica and had to be carried to the Capital on a cot daily, as he was unable to sit up.

In 1913, He died at his home in Wadesboro from pneumonia at the age of 73. He is buried in his family cemetery in Wadesboro, North Carolina.

U.S. House of Representatives
Preceded by District created	Member of the U.S. House of Representatives from North Carolina's at-large congressional district 1883–1885	Succeeded by District eliminated
Preceded by Clement Dowd	Member of the U.S. House of Representatives from North Carolina's 6th congressional district 1885–1887	Succeeded by Alfred Rowland
