= Hannibal L. Godwin =

American politician

Member of the U.S. House of Representatives from North Carolina's 6th district
- In office March 4, 1907 – March 3, 1921
- Preceded by: Gilbert B. Patterson
- Succeeded by: Homer L. Lyon

Member of the North Carolina Senate
- In office 1903

Personal details
- Born: Hannibal Lafayette Godwin; November 3, 1873
- Died: June 9, 1929 (aged 55)
- Resting place: Dunn's Greenwood Cemetery
- Party: Democratic
- Spouse: Mattie Black Barnes
- Education: Trinity College; University of North Carolina at Chapel Hill
- Occupation: Attorney

Hannibal Lafayette Godwin (November 3, 1873 – June 9, 1929) was an American lawyer and politician who served seven terms as a Democratic U.S. Congressman from North Carolina between 1907 and 1921.

== Education and career ==
Born near Dunn in Harnett County, North Carolina, Godwin attended common schools near his home and then Trinity College (later Duke University) in Durham. He studied law at the University of North Carolina at Chapel Hill.

=== Family ===
Godwin married Mattie Black Barnes (January 9, 1876 – January 11, 1951), daughter of Hugh and Jennetta (Parker) Barnes, on December 23, 1896, in Harnett County, North Carolina.

=== Early career ===
After being admitted to the bar in 1896, he practiced in Dunn and was elected Dunn's mayor in 1897. In 1903, Godwin was sent to the North Carolina Senate, and from 1904 to 1906, he sat on the executive committee of the North Carolina Democratic Party.

=== Congress ===
In 1906, Godwin was first elected to the United States Congress; he would be re-elected six times, serving from March 4, 1907, to March 3, 1921. In Congress, he rose to chair the Committee on Reform in the Civil Service.

He lost his congressional race in 1920 and returned to the practice of law in Dunn.

=== Death and burial ===
Godwin died in Dunn in 1929 and was interred in Dunn's Greenwood Cemetery.

U.S. House of Representatives
Preceded by Gilbert B. Patterson	Member of the U.S. House of Representatives from North Carolina's 6th congressional district 1907–1921	Succeeded by Homer L. Lyon
