= James A. Lockhart =

American politician

James A. Alexander
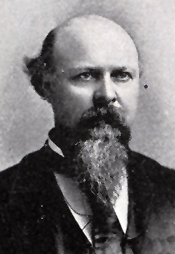

Member of the U.S. House of Representatives from North Carolina's 6th district
- In office March 4, 1895 – June 5, 1896
- Preceded by: Sydenham B. Alexander
- Succeeded by: Charles H. Martin

Personal details
- Born: James Alexander Lockhart; June 2, 1850 Anson County, North Carolina
- Died: December 24, 1905 (aged 55) Charlotte, NC
- Resting place: Eastview Cemetery
- Party: Democratic
- Education: Trinity College

James Alexander Lockhart (June 2, 1850 – December 24, 1905) was an American lawyer and politician who served part of one term as a United States representative from North Carolina in the late 19th century before being unseated mid-term following an investigation into the legitimacy of his election.

== Biography ==
Lockhart was born in Anson County, North Carolina, on June 2, 1850, and attended the common schools. Lockhart graduated from Trinity College, in Durham, North Carolina, in June 1873; he studied law in Charlotte, North Carolina, and was admitted to the bar in 1874.

=== Early career ===
He settled in Wadesboro, North Carolina, where he practiced law. He was elected mayor of Wadesboro in 1875. He served in the North Carolina House of Representatives in 1879 and in the North Carolina Senate in 1881.

=== Congress and election controversy ===
Lockhart, a Democrat, presented his credentials as a Member-elect to the Fifty-fourth Congress and served from March 4, 1895, to June 5, 1896, when he was unseated in favor of Charles H. Martin, who had contested the results of the 1894 election.

Lockhart faced Martin again in the election of 1896, which Martin won by a large margin.

=== Later career and death ===
Lockhart resumed his law practice in Wadesboro. He died in Charlotte, on December 24, 1905. He was buried in Eastview Cemetery, in Wadesboro.

U.S. House of Representatives
Preceded by Sydenham B. Alexander	Member of the U.S. House of Representatives from North Carolina's 6th congressional district 1895–1896	Succeeded by Charles H. Martin
