= John Dillard Bellamy Sr. =

North Carolina slave owner, Secessionist and doctor

John Dillard Bellamy, M.D. (September 18, 1817 - August 30, 1896) was a North Carolina slave owner, Secessionist and doctor who built and owned the Bellamy Mansion in Wilimington, now a museum.

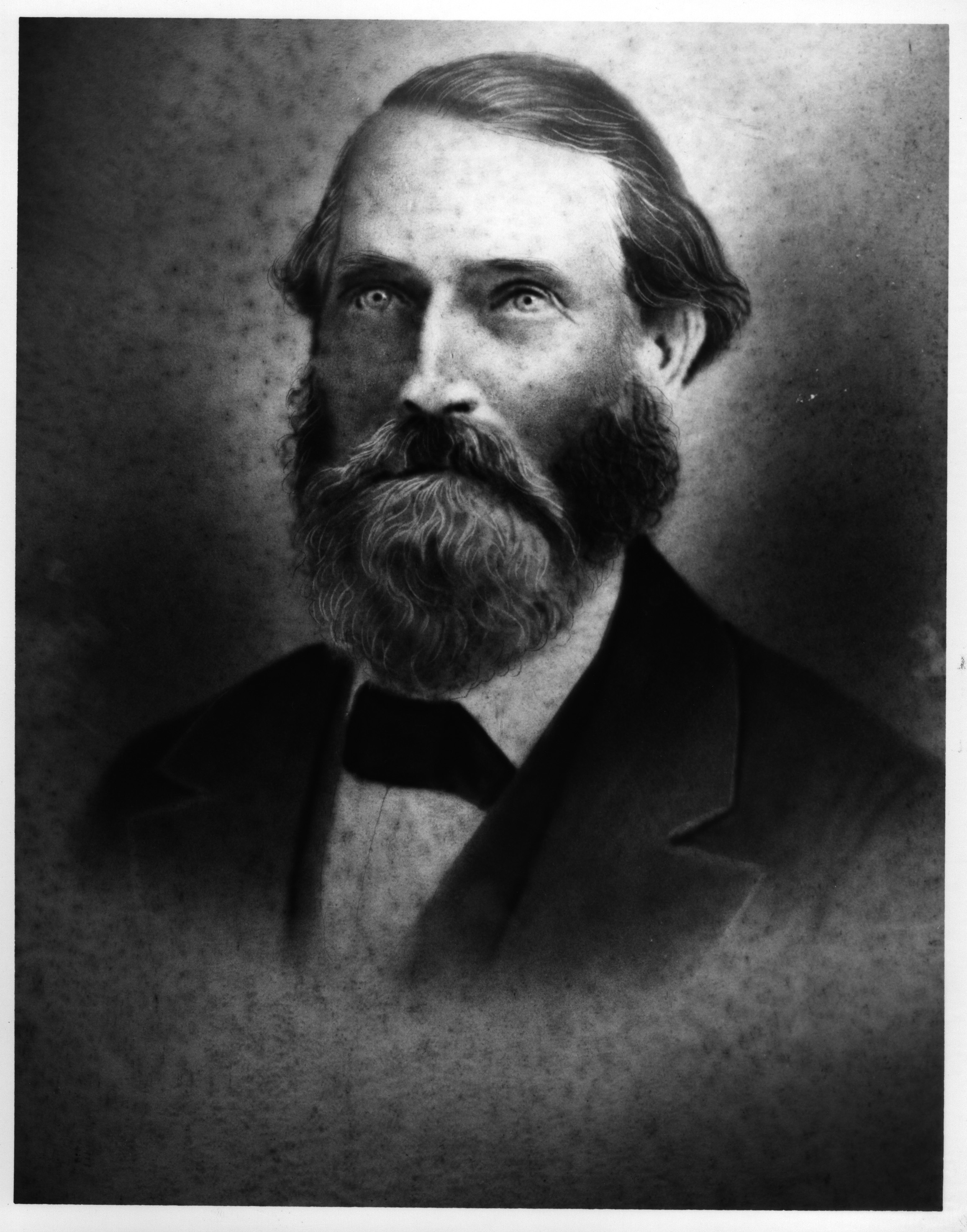
John Dillard Bellamy.

== Family ==
John Dillard Bellamy, M.D. married Eliza McIlhenny Harriss (August 6, 1821 – October 18, 1907) on June 12, 1839. Over the next twenty-two years Bellamy and Eliza had ten children: Mary Elizabeth (Belle) (1840–1900), Marsden (1843–1909), William James Harriss (1844–1911), Eliza (Liza) (1845–1929), Ellen Douglass (1852–1946), John Dillard Jr. (1854–1942), George Harriss (1856–1924), Kate Taylor (1858-1858), Chesley Calhoun (1859–1881), and Robert Rankin (1861–1926).

== Slave holdings and business ==
As a young man, John Dillard Bellamy Sr. inherited a large piece of his father's plantation in Horry County, South Carolina at about age 18, along with several enslaved workers. John soon moved to Wilmington, North Carolina, to begin studying medicine with William James Harriss. He left for two years in 1837 to study at Jefferson Medical College in Philadelphia, Pennsylvania, and he returned to Wilmington in 1839 to marry Eliza, Harriss' eldest daughter and take over Harriss’ medical practice following Eliza's father's untimely death in July. After their wedding, Bellamy took over William James Harriss' medical practice in July 1839. The Bellamys lived in the Dock Street home of Eliza's newly widowed mother, Mary Priscilla Jennings Harriss. Upon his death, Harriss left behind his wife, along with seven children and fourteen enslaved workers who were also living at the household. John and Eliza welcomed four of their own children into the Dock Street home before they moved across the street in 1846 to the former residence of the sixteenth governor, Benjamin Smith. It was here, from 1852 to 1859, that the next five of the Bellamy's ten children were born. By 1860, as the Bellamy family prepared to move into their new home on Market Street, their family included eight children, ages ranging from one to nineteen. Along with the ten members of the Bellamy family, nine enslaved workers also lived at the household. In 1861, Robert Rankin was the last born of the children and the only one to be born in the mansion on Market Street.

Among the enslaved workers engaged in the construction of the Bellamy mansion were William Gould, who later escaped and served in the Union Navy, writing one of only three Civil War diaries known to be written by former slaves. Others who worked on construction of the house were Elvin Artis, a free black carpenter who acted as foreman and ran a prominent local barber shop, and two or more members of the enslaved Sadgwar family, David and his eldest son Frederick, are believed to also have worked on the site.

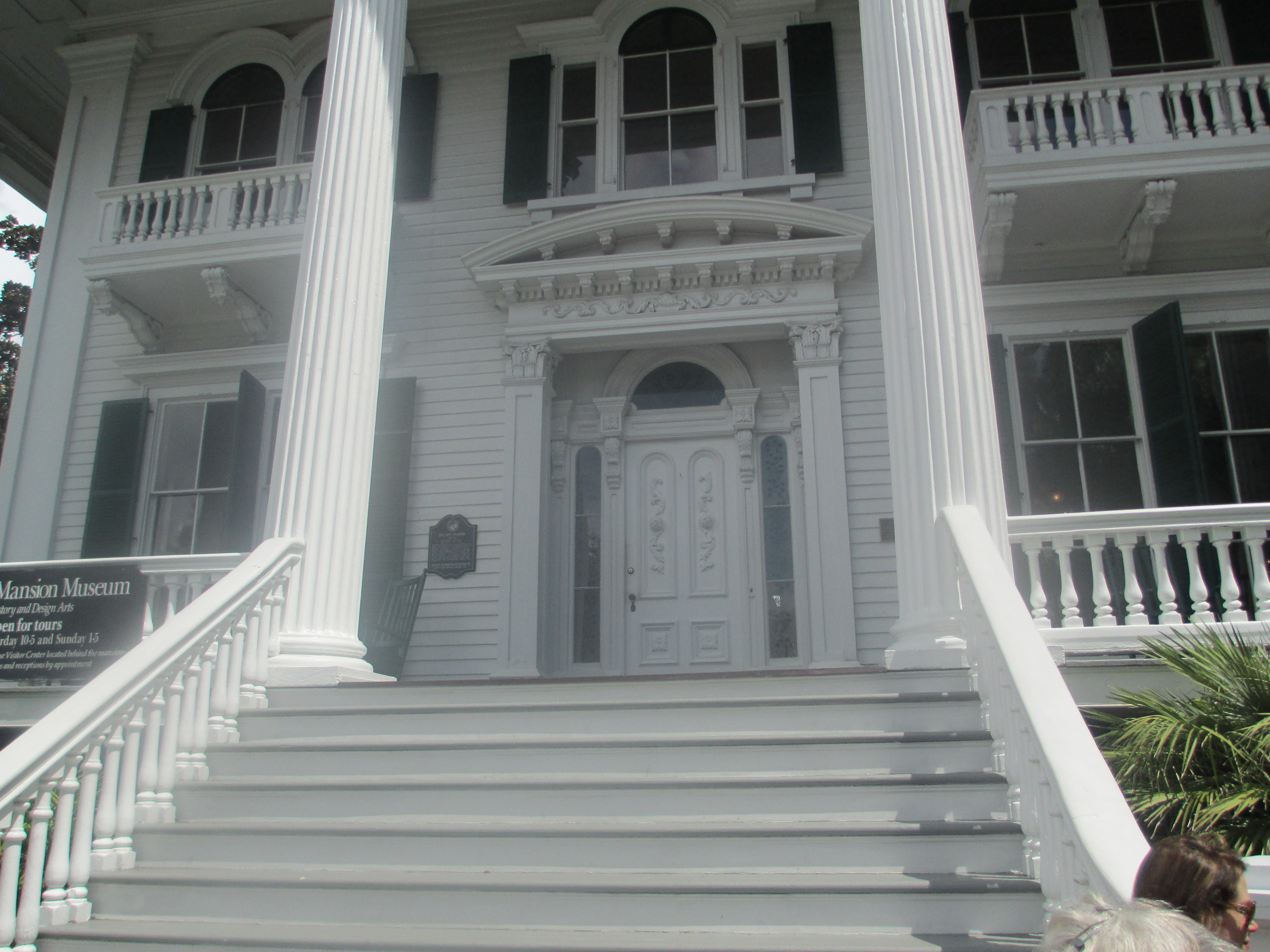
The front steps to the Bellamy Mansion

Bellamy's prosperity continued to grow through the second half of the nineteenth century and by 1850 he was listed as a "merchant" on the census. His medical practice was successful; however, the majority of his wealth came from his operation of a turpentine distillery in Brunswick County, his position as a director of the Bank of the Cape Fear, and his investment, as director and stockholder, in the Wilmington and Weldon Railroad.

Grovely Plantation was "an almost ten thousand acre" produce plantation on Town Creek in Brunswick County, now a present-day Brunswick Forest development, on which Bellamy raised livestock and crops such as "wheat, oats, corn, and peanuts." In 1860, he had 82 enslaved workers living in 17 "slave cabins" at Grovely, while the family lived in a "comfortable and pleasant" home that was "no stately mansion." Grist Plantation was a turpentine plantation in Columbus County, near Chadbourn, North Carolina. Bellamy kept 24 enslaved men between the ages of 18 and 40 living in 9 slave cabins. The work was extremely difficult for the enslaved workers but very profitable for Bellamy. According to John D. Bellamy Jr. his father told him concerning the home at 5th and Market the "amount of its cost was only one year's profit that he made at Grist."

Bellamy was an extremely wealthy man as indicated by his land and slave holdings. In 1860, he owned 114 enslaved workers in North Carolina spread across three counties. Only 117 other men in the entire state owned between 100 and 199 enslaved workers out of a slave owning population of almost 35,000, meaning John D. Bellamy was in the upper echelon and of the planter class.

== Sons and daughters ==
The sons of John D. Bellamy followed in their father's footsteps and became successful students and career men in and outside of Wilmington. Marsden, the eldest of the sons, became a prominent trial attorney in Wilmington. William developed a successful medical practice of his own, just as his father and grandfather had before in Wilmington. George became a farmer and took over Grovely Plantation, land that his father had purchased in 1842 in Brunswick County, North Carolina, later going on to serve multiple terms in the North Carolina Senate between 1893 and 1914. The youngest son, Robert, became a successful businessman in the pharmaceutical industry. John Jr. attended Davidson College, and the University of Virginia Law School, and eventually became a successful politician in the conservative Democratic Party. From 1899 -1903 John Jr. represented North Carolina as a United States Congressman, and served as the Dean of the North Carolina Bar Association from 1926 to 1927. Chesley Calhoun died at the age of twenty-one, while studying at Davidson College.

Only one of the four daughters of John and Eliza Bellamy grew to marry and have children. Mary Elizabeth (Belle) married William Jefferson Duffie of Columbia, South Carolina on September 12, 1876. They had two children, Eliza (Elise) Bellamy Duffie, and Ellen Douglas Duffie. Of the other three daughters of John and Eliza Bellamy, Eliza and Ellen lived out their days unmarried in the family mansion on Market Street, while Kate Taylor died as an infant in 1858. Later in life Ellen would write her memoir Back With the Tide, which provides an informative inside account of the Bellamy Mansion and its history.

In March 1861 the family prepared to move into their new home on Market Street, and held a housewarming party, as well as the celebration of two cousins' weddings. The dining room table here was "laden with everything conceivably good," but the Civil War broke out the following month and "ended all entertaining for four long years."

== Confederate activism in the Civil War ==
Two months after moving into the new home, on May 20, 1861, North Carolina officially seceded from the Union. Bellamy was a secessionist, and he assumed the honor of heading the welcoming committee when Jefferson Davis visited Wilmington in late May. John Jr. described his father as an "ardent Secessionist, Calhoun Democrat, and never after the war ‘reconstructed.’" Bellamy was so proud of South Carolina’s secession in December 1860 and so dismayed that many prominent Wilmington families "would not take part in the celebration of South Carolina's withdrawal from the Union, he bought all the empty tar barrels in Wilmington and had them strewn along Front Street...and had a great bonfire and procession at night, three days before the Christmas of 1860. He procured a band of music, and headed the marching column himself, at Front and Market Streets, with his little son and namesake, the author, by his side, bearing a torch upon his shoulder! It was a night to live always in his memory, and of which he was ever afterwards proud!" Marsden Bellamy, the eldest of the sons, had enlisted in the Scotland Neck Cavalry volunteers before the official secession, and later enlisted in the Confederate Navy. Just a few months later, his younger brother William would join the Wilmington Rifle Guards.

As the war continued, Bellamy and his family remained in residence at their new Market Street home until a yellow fever epidemic began to spread throughout Wilmington. The family took refuge at Grovely Plantation. On January 15, 1865, Bellamy and his family learned that Fort Fisher had been captured by Union troops under General Alfred H. Terry. This was a significant loss to the Confederacy, as Wilmington was the last major port supplying the southern states.

While the family was still at Grovely Plantation, Federal troops arrived in Wilmington on February 22, having pushed many of the Confederate troops inland. Union officers took shelter in the nicer homes in town whose owners had been forced to abandon them. The Bellamy House was quickly occupied and chosen to be headquarters for the military staff.

== After the Civil War ==
After the official end of the war in April 1865, the Federal Government seized southern property, including land, buildings, and homes of Bellamy. The Bellamys came to reclaim their house, but General Hawley forbade Bellamy entrance to Wilmington.

Gen. Joseph Hawley wrote about Bellamy to another Union officer upon receipt of Bellamy’s oath of allegiance to the federal government stating, "As a specimen of the temper of certain people I inclose a copy of an application from J.D. Bellamy, which explains itself. Bellamy was a rabid secessionist here and tyrannized over all suspected of Unionism. He ran away, but only to get under the feet of General Sherman’s forces. From a neighboring county he sends in this appeal. I have answered verbally that having for four years been making his bed, he now must lie on it for awhile. I have no time to take him within the lines."

Mrs. Bellamy traveled into Wilmington in May 1865 to meet with Mrs. Harriett Foote Hawley hoping to retrieve her home but the meeting did not go as planned. Harriett was from a staunch Hartford, Connecticut abolitionist family and first cousin of Harriet Beecher Stowe. General and Mrs. Hawley left for Richmond, Virginia soon after, however the home remained occupied by other Union soldiers.

In the summer of 1865, he sought a pardon to reclaim his property and by August 21, he received a presidential pardon from Andrew Johnson which allowed him to retrieve his plantation land and commercial buildings, but the Bellamy House on Market Street was still under military control.

Bellamy regained the property, and now had to hire freed workers for the turpentine distillery, Grovely Plantation, and the family home on Market Street. He resumed his practice of medicine to gain the extra money needed to pay off debts brought about by the building of the mansion, the war, and military occupation.

Bellamy died just before the turn of the century in 1896, and his wife Eliza passed away roughly ten years later in 1907.

== See also ==
- Bellamy Mansion
- John D. Bellamy
