= Julia McGehee Alexander =

American politician (1876–1957)

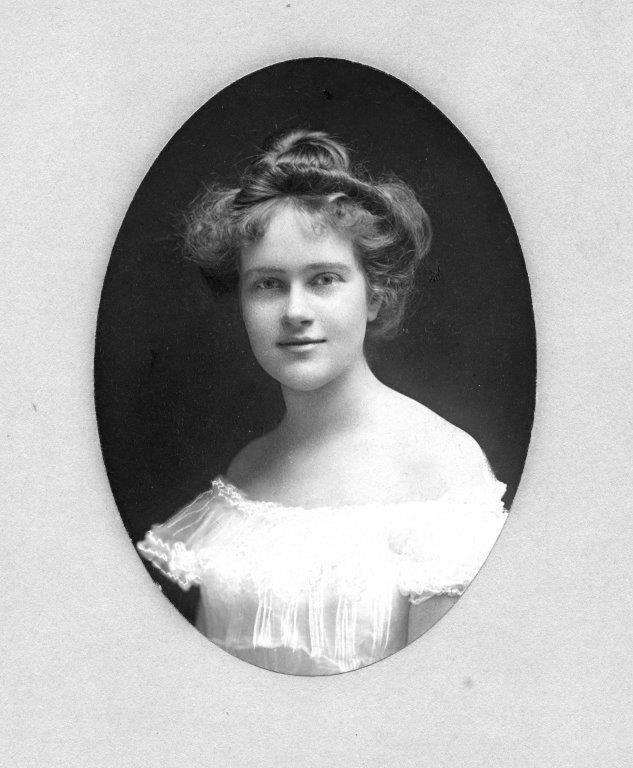

Member of the North Carolina House of Representatives
- In office 1925–1927

Personal details
- Born: January 14, 1876 Mecklenburg County, North Carolina, U.S.
- Died: February 23, 1957 (aged 81)
- Resting place: Elmwood Cemetery
- Party: Democratic Party
- Parent(s): Sydenham B. Alexander (father); Pauline Violet Nicholson (mother)
- Education: Mary Baldwin College; UNC Chapel Hill; University of Michigan; Columbia University

Julia McGehee Alexander (January 14, 1876 – February 23, 1957) was an American politician, lawyer, and historian. She was the second woman to become licensed to practice law in North Carolina and the second woman to serve in the North Carolina House of Representatives.

== Early life, family, and education ==
Alexander was born at Enderly, her family's plantation near Charlotte, North Carolina, on January 14, 1876, to Sydenham B. Alexander and Pauline Violet Nicholson. She was of Scotch-Irish heritage. Her father was a Confederate States Army officer who later served as a state senator and a U.S. Congressman. Alexander was a grandniece of William Alexander Graham, who served as Governor of North Carolina and as U.S. Secretary of the Navy. Through her father, she was distantly related to Vice President Adlai Stevenson I and Senator John Sharp Williams.

She attended Mary Baldwin College and studied law at the University of North Carolina. She continued her studies at the University of Michigan and Columbia University School of Law.

== Career ==
In 1914, Alexander was admitted to the North Carolina Bar, and in 1919, she was elected first president of the North Carolina Federation of Business and Professional Women. She was the second woman in North Carolina to obtain a law license and the first women in the state to enter an independent law practice. She was also the first woman to practice law in Charlotte.

In 1925, Alexander was elected to the North Carolina House of Representatives, becoming the second woman to sit in the house, following Lillian Exum Clement. She served in the house until 1927. She later serced as vice president of the Mecklenburg Bar Association and the American Bar Association.

Alexander was active in historical endeavors and served as the first regent of the Mecklenburg Chapter of the Daughters of the American Revolution and as president of the Stonewall Jackson Chapter of the United Daughters of the Confederacy. She was also a charter member of the Hornet's Nest, Post 9 of the American Legion Auxiliary. Alexander served as the official historian of Mecklenburg County, aiding in the building the Mint Museum, authoring Charlotte in Picture and Prose, A Short History of Mecklenburg County, and Mothers of Great Men, and serving as chairwoman of Charlotte's George Washington Bi-Centennial Commission. She was also the founding president of the Charlotte Humane Society.

== Personal life ==
Alexander was a parishioner at First Presbyterian Church of Charlotte.
