= North Carolina's at-large congressional seat =

North Carolina's at-large congressional district
- Obsolete district
- Created: 1880
- Eliminated: 1885
- Years active: 1883–1885

North Carolina elected one of its members of the United States House of Representatives at-large statewide. This only happened once, during the 48th United States Congress. That member was Risden T. Bennett.

== List of member representing the district ==
Member (Residence)	Party	Years	Cong ress	Electoral history
Seat established March 4, 1883
Risden Tyler Bennett (Wadesboro)	Democratic	March 4, 1883 – March 3, 1885	48th	Elected in 1882. Redistricted to the 6th district.
Seat dissolved March 4, 1885
