= Sydenham B. Alexander =

American politician (1840–1921)

S.B. Alexander
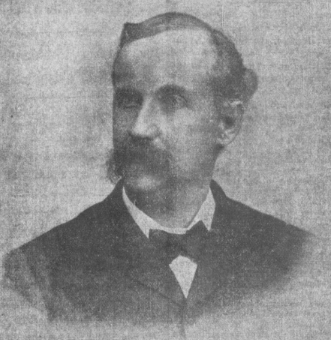

Member of the U.S. House of Representatives from North Carolina's 6th district
- In office March 4, 1891 – March 3, 1895
- Preceded by: Alfred Rowland
- Succeeded by: James A. Lockhart

Personal details
- Born: Sydenham Benoni Alexander; December 8, 1840 near Charlotte, North Carolina
- Died: June 14, 1921 (aged 80) Charlotte, NC
- Resting place: Elmwood Cemetery
- Party: Democratic
- Spouse: Pauline Violet Nicholson
- Children: Julia McGehee Alexander

Sydenham Benoni Alexander (December 8, 1840 – June 14, 1921) was a Confederate veteran of the American Civil War who served two terms as a Democratic U.S. Congressman from North Carolina between 1891 and 1895.

== Early life ==
Alexander, born near Charlotte, North Carolina in 1840, attended preparatory schools in Rocky River and Wadesboro and graduated from the University of North Carolina at Chapel Hill in 1860. His uncle, William Graham, was Governor of North Carolina as well as Secretary of the Navy.

== Civil War ==
At the outbreak of the American Civil War in 1861, he enlisted in the Confederate Army as a private in the First Regiment, North Carolina Volunteer Infantry. He was elected captain of Company K, Forty-second North Carolina Regiment, in June 1862. He detached from his company in 1864 and served as inspector general on the staff of Maj. Gen. Robert F. Hoke.

== Career ==
After the Civil War, Alexander was a member of the North Carolina Senate in 1879, 1883, 1885, 1887, where he was instrumental in the establishment of the North Carolina College of Agriculture and Mechanic Arts (later North Carolina State University; Alexander served on its board of trustees), and was president of the North Carolina Railroad. He became the first president of the North Carolina Farmers Alliance around 1887. He was an unsuccessful candidate for the Democratic nomination for Governor of North Carolina in 1888. After his defeat at the state convention by Daniel Gould Fowle, Alexander was offered the nomination for Lieutenant Governor but declined.

=== Congress ===
A Democrat, Alexander was elected to the U.S. House in 1890 and served in the 52nd and 53rd Congresses. He did not run for a third term in 1894, but retired to his "Enderly Plantation" estate in Mecklenburg County. He served one additional term in the North Carolina Senate in 1901.

== Personal life ==
Alexander was married to Pauline Violet Nicholson and was the father of Julia McGehee Alexander.

== Death and legacy ==
Alexander finally moved to Charlotte in 1906 and died there in 1921; he is buried in Elmwood Cemetery.

His distant relatives include Vice President Adlai Stevenson and Senate Minority Leader John Sharp Williams.

== Notes ==
U.S. House of Representatives
Preceded by Alfred Rowland	Member of the U.S. House of Representatives from North Carolina's 6th congressional district 1891-1895	Succeeded by James A. Lockhart
