= Homer L. Lyon =

American politician (1879–1956)

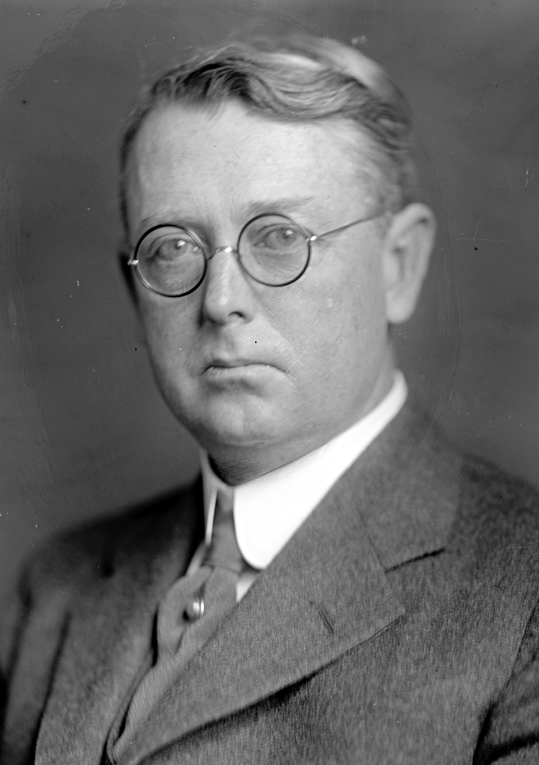

Member of the U.S. House of Representatives from North Carolina's 6th district
- In office March 4, 1921 – March 3, 1929
- Preceded by: Hannibal L. Godwin
- Succeeded by: J. Bayard Clark

Personal details
- Born: Homer Le Grand Lyon; March 1, 1879 Elizabethtown, North Carolina, U.S.
- Died: May 31, 1956 (aged 77) Whiteville, North Carolina, U.S.
- Resting place: Memorial Cemetery
- Party: Democratic
- Education: University of North Carolina School of Law
- Profession: Politician, lawyer

Homer Le Grand Lyon (March 1, 1879 – May 31, 1956) was an American lawyer and politician who served for terms as a U.S. representative from North Carolina from 1921 to 1929.

== Biography ==
Born in Elizabethtown, North Carolina, Lyon attended the public schools, the Davis Military School, Winston, North Carolina, and the law department of the University of North Carolina at Chapel Hill. He was admitted to the bar in 1900 and commenced practice in Whiteville, North Carolina.

=== Early career ===
He served as delegate to every Democratic State convention from 1901 to 1921. He served as delegate to the Democratic National Conventions in 1904 and 1940.

He served as solicitor of the eighth judicial district of North Carolina from 1913 to 1920.

=== Congress ===
Lyon was elected as a Democrat to the Sixty-seventh and to the three succeeding Congresses (March 4, 1921 – March 3, 1929).

He was not a candidate for renomination in 1928.

=== Later career and death ===
He resumed the practice of law in Whiteville, North Carolina, until his retirement in 1950.

He died in Whiteville, North Carolina, May 31, 1956. He was interred in Memorial Cemetery.

== Sources ==
- United States Congress. "Homer L. Lyon (id: L000543)". Biographical Directory of the United States Congress.

U.S. House of Representatives
Preceded by Hannibal L. Godwin	Member of the U.S. House of Representatives from North Carolina's 6th congressional district 1921–1929	Succeeded by J. Bayard Clark
