= Alfred Rowland =

American politician

Member of the U.S. House of Representatives from North Carolina's 6th district
- In office March 4, 1887 – March 3, 1891
- Preceded by: Risden T. Bennett
- Succeeded by: Sydenham B. Alexander

Personal details
- Born: February 9, 1844 Lumberton, North Carolina, U.S.
- Died: August 2, 1898 (aged 54) Lumberton, North Carolina, U.S.
- Party: Democratic

Alfred Rowland (February 9, 1844 – August 2, 1898) was a U.S. representative from North Carolina.

Born in Lumberton, North Carolina, Rowland attended the common schools in the area. He entered the Confederate States Army in May, 1861 and served as a lieutenant in Company D, Eighteenth Regiment of North Carolina State Troops, until May 12, 1864. He was then imprisoned at Fort Delaware until June 1865. After the war, he studied law, was admitted to the bar in 1867 and commenced practice in Lumberton. Afterwards, he served as a member of the State house of representatives in 1876, 1877, 1880, and 1881. Rowland was elected as a Democrat to the Fiftieth and Fifty-first Congresses (March 4, 1887 – March 3, 1891). However, he was not a candidate for renomination in 1890. After his political career, he resumed the practice of law. He died in Lumberton, North Carolina, on August 2, 1898, and was interred in Meadow Brook Cemetery. The town of Rowland was named in his honor.

== Works cited ==
- Powell, William S. (1976). The North Carolina Gazetteer: A Dictionary of Tar Heel Places. Chapel Hill: The University of North Carolina Press. ISBN 9780807812471.

U.S. House of Representatives
Preceded by Risden T. Bennett	Member of the U.S. House of Representatives from North Carolina's 6th congressional district 1887–1891	Succeeded by Sydenham B. Alexander
