= Gilbert B. Patterson =

American politician (1863–1922)

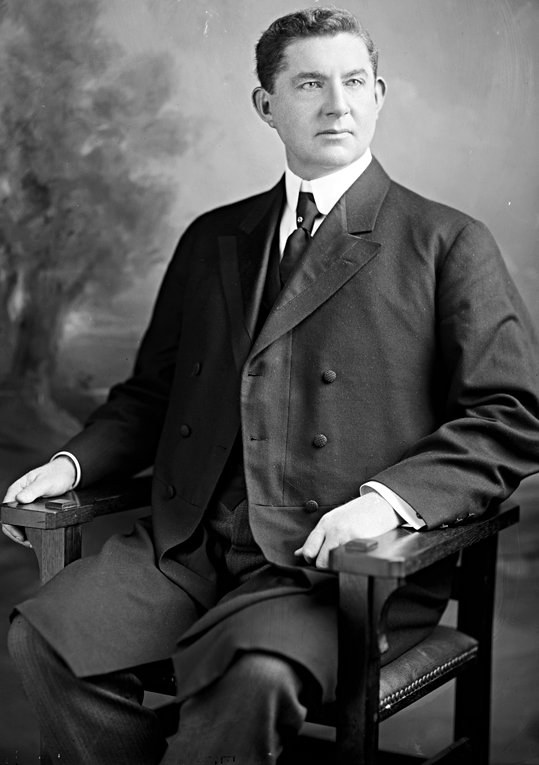
- Portrait of Gilbert B Patterson

Member of the U.S. House of Representatives from North Carolina's 6th district
- In office March 4, 1903 – March 3, 1907
- Preceded by: John D. Bellamy
- Succeeded by: Hannibal L. Godwin

Member of the North Carolina House of Representatives
- In office 1899–1901

Personal details
- Born: Gilbert Brown Patterson; May 29, 1863 Robeson County, North Carolina
- Died: January 26, 1922 (aged 58) Maxton, North Carolina
- Resting place: Maxton Cemetery
- Citizenship: United States
- Party: Democratic
- Spouse: Martha Virginia "Mattie" McNair Evans Patterson
- Children: Mary McNair Patterson Johnson; Erasmus Hervey Evans (stepson)
- Education: University of North Carolina
- Profession: teacher; Attorney; politician; planter

Gilbert Brown Patterson (May 29, 1863 – January 26, 1922) was an American lawyer and politician who served two terms as a member of the United States House of Representatives from North Carolina from 1903 to 1907.

== Biography ==
Born May 29, 1863 near Maxton, Robeson County, North Carolina, Patterson was the son of Gilbert and Margaret P. Patterson. He attended Shoe Heel Academy, Shoe Heel (now Maxton), North Carolina, and the Laurinburg (North Carolina) High School and graduated from the University of North Carolina at Chapel Hill in 1886 where he was a member of Sigma Alpha Epsilon fraternity. From 1886 to 1889, he taught in Elizabeth City, studied law, and was admitted to the bar in 1890. He then commenced practice in Maxton, North Carolina.

== Career ==
Patterson was a member of the State house of representatives from 1899 to 1901.

=== Congress ===
He was elected as a Democrat to the Fifty-eighth and Fifty-ninth Congresses and served from March 4, 1903 to March 3, 1907.

=== Family and later career ===
Returning to his law practice in 1907, Patterson married Mrs. Mattie Virginia McNair Evans. She had a son, Erasmus Hervey Evans, and, together they had a daughter, Mary McNair Patterson. He was a large landholder, a Master Mason and a Shriner, and for many years a ruling elder in the Presbyterian church.

== Death ==
Patterson died in Maxton, Robeson County, North Carolina, on January 26, 1922. He is interred at Maxton Cemetery, Maxton, North Carolina. He was honored posthumously by his hometown of Maxton with the naming of the Gilbert Patterson Memorial Library, which opened in 1927.

U.S. House of Representatives
Preceded by John D. Bellamy	Member of the U.S. House of Representatives from North Carolina's 6th congressional district 1903–1907	Succeeded by Hannibal L. Godwin
