= National Register of Historic Places listings in Anson County, North Carolina =

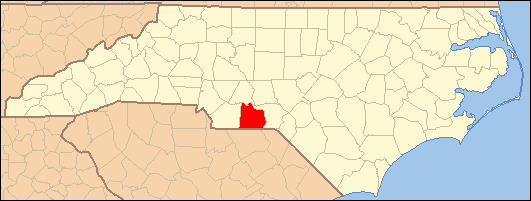

This list includes properties and districts listed on the National Register of Historic Places in Anson County, North Carolina. Click the "Map of all coordinates" link to the right to view a Google map of all properties and districts with latitude and longitude coordinates in the table below.

This National Park Service list is complete through NPS recent listings posted March 14, 2025.

== Current listings ==
	Name on the Register	Image	Date listed	Location	City or town	Description
1	Boggan-Hammond House and Alexander Little Wing	Boggan-Hammond House and Alexander Little Wing	September 14, 1972 (#72000923)	210 Wade St. 34°57′57″N 80°04′29″W	Wadesboro	
2	Barrett-Faulkner House	Barrett-Faulkner House	September 4, 2012 (#12000601)	2063 Monroe-White Store Rd. 34°54′19″N 80°18′25″W	Peachland	
3	Chambers-Morgan Farm		December 27, 1996 (#96001526)	West side of NC 1228, 0.1 miles (0.16 km) north of NC 1225; 34°52′17″N 80°17′30″W	White Store	
4	Billy Horne Farm		June 9, 1989 (#89000496)	NC 1246, 0.5 miles (0.80 km) west of the junction with NC 1240; 34°56′24″N 80°15′18″W	Polkton	
5	US Post Office	US Post Office	July 6, 1987 (#87001161)	105-111 Martin St. 34°58′03″N 80°04′35″W	Wadesboro	
6	Wadesboro Downtown Historic District	Wadesboro Downtown Historic District	April 1, 1999 (#99000425)	Roughly bounded by Martin, Rutherford, Morgan, Lee, and Brent Sts. 34°57′57″N 80°04′37″W	Wadesboro	
7	Westview Cemetery	Westview Cemetery	April 29, 2015 (#15000201)	West of Madison Ave. and south of Henry St. 34°58′14″N 80°05′06″W	Wadesboro	

== See also ==
- National Register of Historic Places listings in North Carolina
- List of National Historic Landmarks in North Carolina
