= Conversion (gridiron football) =

Gridiron football scoring play

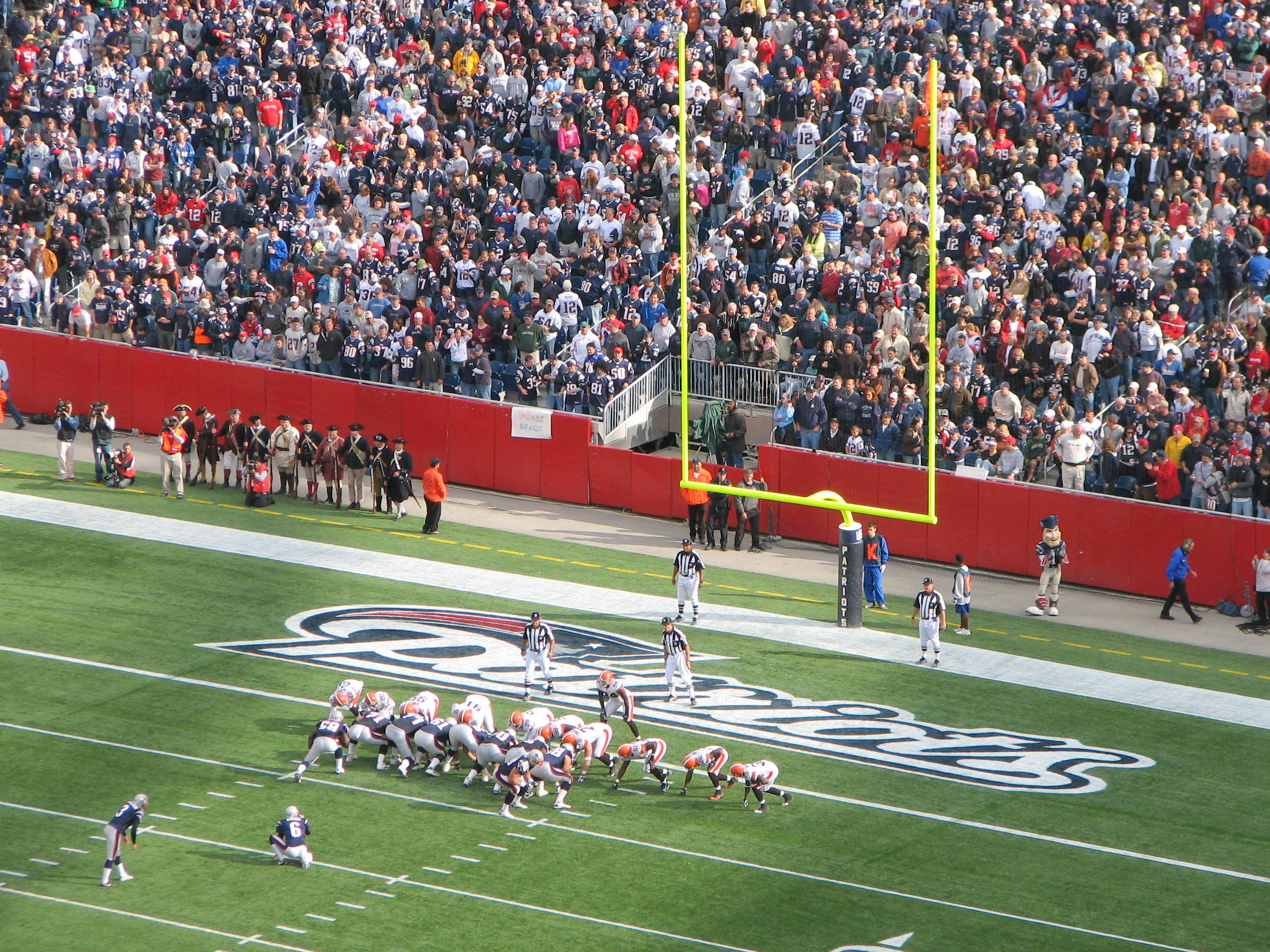
A typical lineup for an extra point, from the pre-2015 distance, in a 2007 NFL game between the New England Patriots and the Cleveland Browns

The conversion, try (American football), also known as a point(s) after touchdown, PAT, extra point, two-point conversion, or convert (Canadian football) is a gridiron football play that occurs immediately after a touchdown. The scoring team attempts to score one extra point by kicking the ball through the uprights in the manner of a field goal, or two points by passing or running the ball into the end zone in the manner of a touchdown.

Attempts at a try or convert are scrimmage plays, with the ball initially placed at any point between the hash marks, at the option of the team making the attempt. The yard line that attempts are made from depends on the league and type of try or convert being attempted.

If the try or convert is scored by kicking the ball through the uprights, the team gets an additional one point for their touchdown, bringing their total for that score from six points to seven. If two points are needed or desired, a two-point conversion may be attempted by running or passing from scrimmage. A successful touchdown conversion from scrimmage brings the score's total to eight.

Whether a team goes for one or two points, most rules regarding scrimmage downs, including scoring touchdowns and field goals, apply as if it were a normal American fourth-down or Canadian third-down play. Exceptions, including cases where the defense forces a turnover during a conversion attempt, vary between leagues and levels of play. One thing that sets the try apart from other plays in the NFL is that, apart from the actual points, ordinary statistics are not recorded on the try as they would be on a regular scrimmage play. For example, on December 4, 2016, Eric Berry of the Kansas City Chiefs made an interception on a try and physically returned it 99 yards for a defensive two-point conversion. However, because it occurred on a try, Berry did not get statistical credit for the 99 yards of return yardage or the interception, but did get credited for scoring 2 points. Likewise, a player will never be credited with passing, rushing, or receiving yardage on a try.

A term popularized by sports writer Mitch Goldich is octopus, in which a player scores the touchdown and the immediately following conversion. The term has gained steam in betting circles as a proposition bet. A notable octopus is one scored by Jalen Hurts to tie Super Bowl LVII with 5:20 left in the game.

== History ==
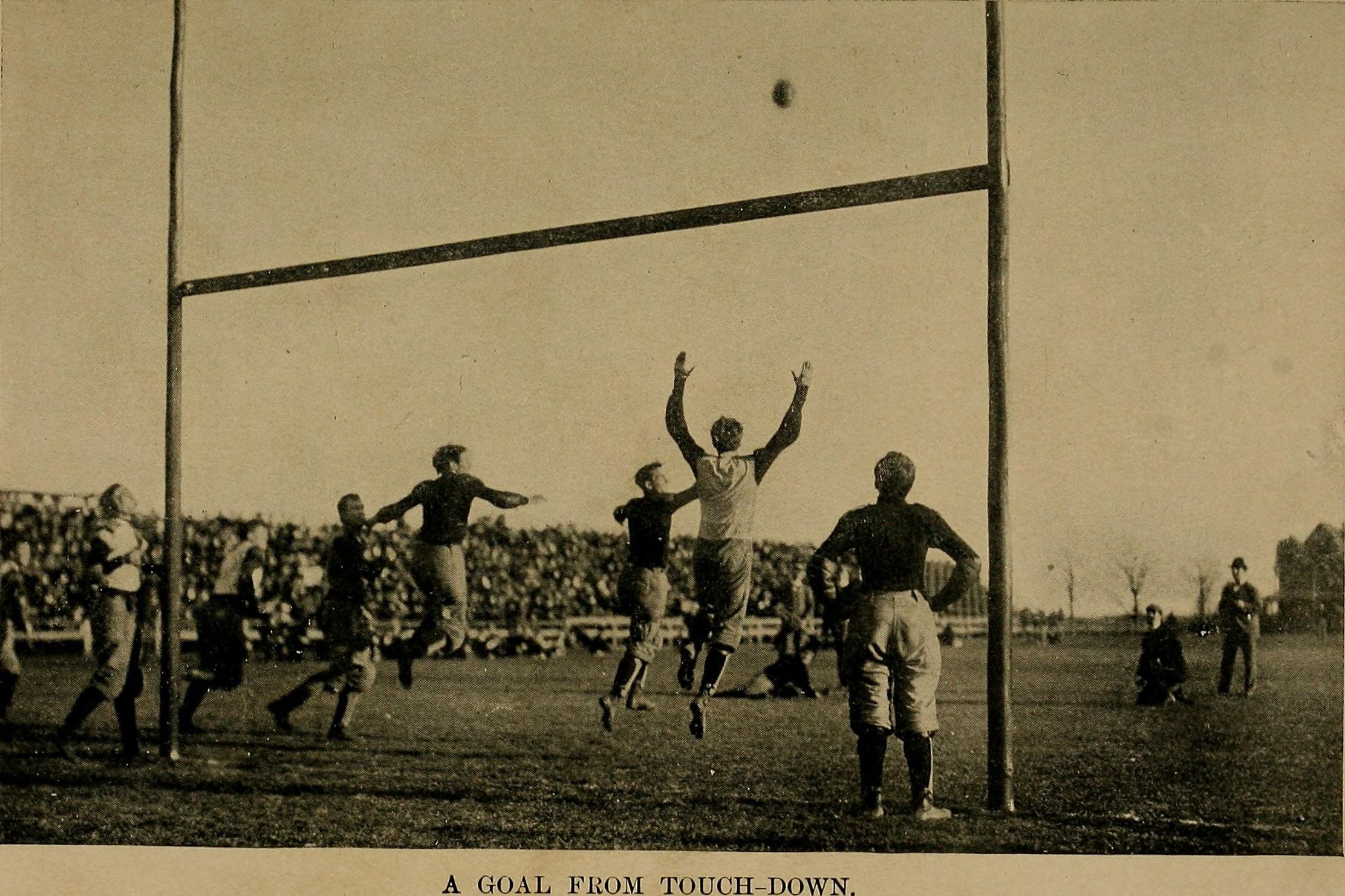
"A goal from touch-down."

The try/convert is among the oldest parts of the game of gridiron football and dates to its rugby roots. In its earliest days, scoring a touchdown was not the primary objective but a means of getting a free kick at the goal (which is why the name "try", more commonly associated with rugby today, is still used in American football rule books), and thus early scoring rubrics for the game gave more points to the subsequent kick than the actual advancement of the ball over the goal line. The related term "conversion" is still used in both rugby union and rugby league to refer to extra points scored by kicking the ball through the posts after a try has been scored.

By the start of the 20th century, touchdowns had become more important and the roles of touchdown and kick were reversed. By this time the point value for the after-touchdown kick had been reduced to its current one-point value while the touchdown was now worth five. (This later increased to six points in American football in 1912 and in Canadian football in 1956.)

In the first half of the 20th century, a one-point conversion could be scored either by kick or by way of a scrimmage play. Beginning in 1958, the scrimmage play conversion method of scoring became worth two points (a two-point conversion) in college football. While the American Football League adopted the college rule throughout its ten-season existence in the 1960s (as did the original United States Football League throughout its three-season existence in the 1980s), other professional leagues were slow to follow suit; all levels of Canadian football did so in 1975, and the National Football League did not do so until 1994.

Although a successful kick is only worth one point, and has a very high rate of success, missed or blocked attempts can decide the outcome of the game:

- One example was the 2003 game between the New Orleans Saints and Jacksonville Jaguars where, after the Saints scored a touchdown in the multiple-lateral River City Relay as time expired, their kicker John Carney missed the extra point, giving the Jaguars a 20–19 victory.
- On October 21, 2018, with 24 seconds remaining on the clock, Baltimore Ravens kicker Justin Tucker had his first-ever missed PAT attempt, ending the game and causing the Baltimore Ravens to lose to the New Orleans Saints 24–23. This was his first missed kick out of 223 attempts.
- On November 11, 1979, the New York Jets lost to the Buffalo Bills 14–12, the difference coming from two missed extra points by place kicker Toni Linhart. Linhart, who had been cut earlier in the 1979 season by the Baltimore Colts and was signed by the Jets to fill in for the injured Pat Leahy, never played another game in the NFL.

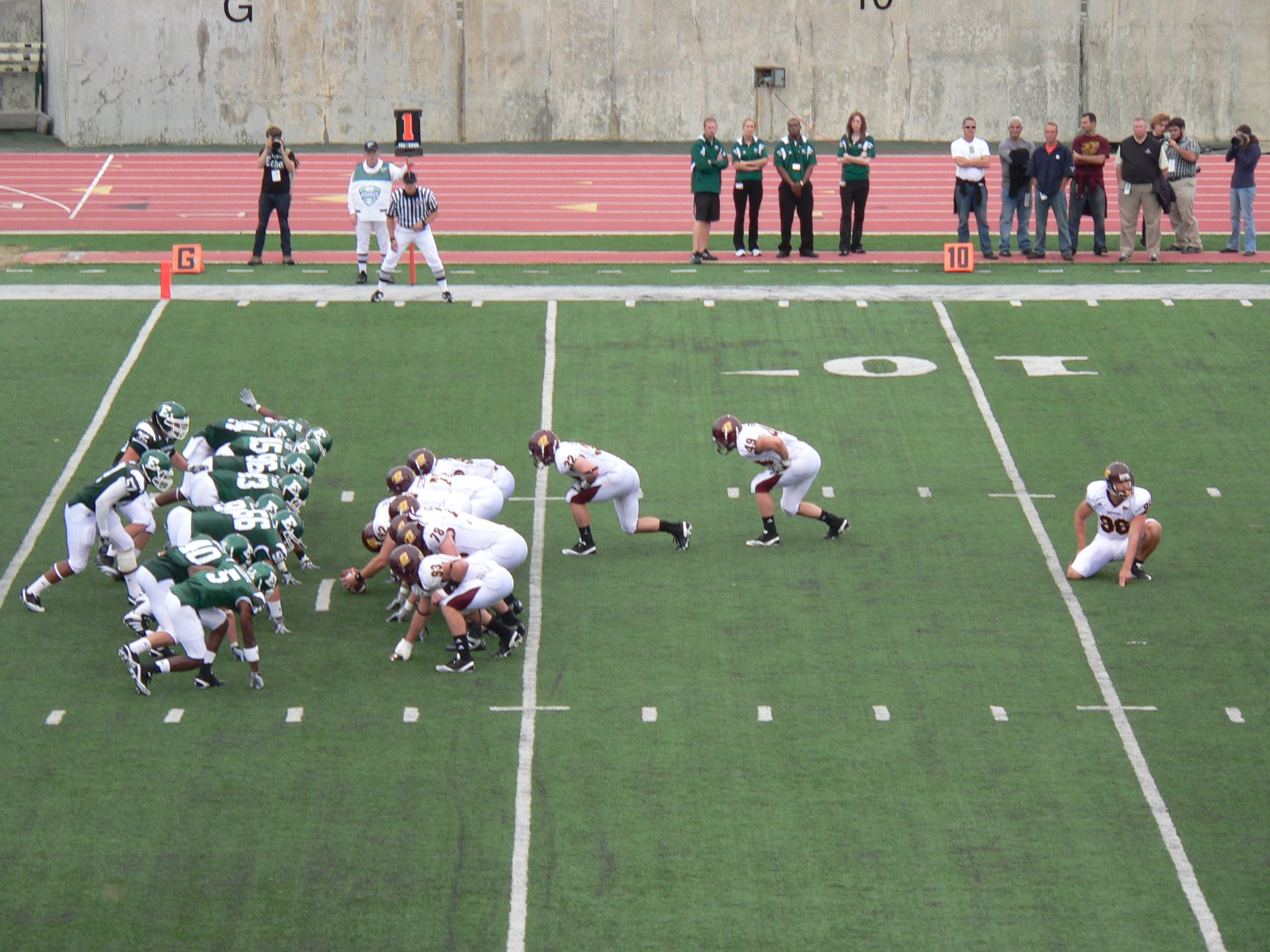
Central Michigan lines up for a PAT.

- Another 2003 game, this one between the Carolina Panthers and Tampa Bay Buccaneers, was sent to overtime after what would have been a game-winning extra point was blocked. The Panthers won the game in overtime 12–9.
- A 2005 game between the Green Bay Packers and Tampa Bay Buccaneers is another example, as the Buccaneers won 17–16, the difference being Ryan Longwell missing an extra point after a Packers touchdown.
- In the 2016 AFC Championship Game, New England Patriots placekicker Stephen Gostkowski missed an extra point in the first quarter, keeping the score at 7–6 in favor of the Denver Broncos. The Patriots were forced to go for two when they scored a touchdown late in the fourth quarter. The two-point try was intercepted, putting the Broncos in Super Bowl 50 with a 20–18 victory.

The CFL and NFL both made major changes to the rules governing conversions prior to their respective 2015 seasons, reducing or eliminating some of the differences between the two leagues.

== Duration of the play ==
In American high school football (in most states), the play is over once the ball becomes dead or the defense takes possession. In many other levels of football, including the CFL, NFL, and American college football, the play continues after a turnover to the defense. This allows the defense to return the ball to the opponent's end zone for two points and also allows for a one-point safety. Two states, Texas and Massachusetts, play high school football under NCAA rules and thus allow the defense to score on an extra-point attempt.

== Differences between leagues ==
In American high school and college football, the line of scrimmage is the three-yard line (a small hashmark is denoted on the field of this in the middle of the 3-yard line), with the kick taking place at the 10-yard line for a 20-yard attempt.

In American football, the game clock does not run during an extra-point attempt, except for some rare circumstances at the high-school level (some state associations allow for the clock to run continuously in the second half if one team is leading the other by a large margin) and for arena football, which runs the clock continuously except during the final minute of each half and overtime. In Canadian football, the clock runs during a conversion attempt except during the last three minutes of each half.

A small plastic tee, which can be 1 to 2 inches (25–51 mm) high (smaller than the kickoff tee), may be used for field goals and extra points in some leagues, including U.S. high schools and Canadian amateur play. The NFL (and most other professional leagues) has never allowed the use of tees for extra-point kick attempts, having always required kickers to kick off the ground for such attempts (and field goals; a rare exception for a U.S.-based pro league to allow the usage of tees for such attempts was the original USFL in the 1980s). In 1948, the NCAA authorized the use of the small rubberized kicking tee for extra points and field goals, but banned them by 1989, requiring kicks from the ground, as in the NFL. The CFL allows the use of a tee for field goals and conversion kicks, but it is optional.

=== Pre-2015 ===
Prior to the 2015 season, the NFL used the 2-yard line (with the kick coming at the 10-yard line for a 20-yard attempt) for all conversion attempts (which was denoted on the field with a hashmark in the middle of the 2-yard line; although the line of scrimmage on the point-after kick attempt was moved back in 2015, it remains to denote the two-point conversion's line of scrimmage). In Canadian football, the line of scrimmage was from the 5-yard line (for a 12-yard attempt; unlike American football, no special hashmark is used to denote the convert's line of scrimmage on the field in Canada).

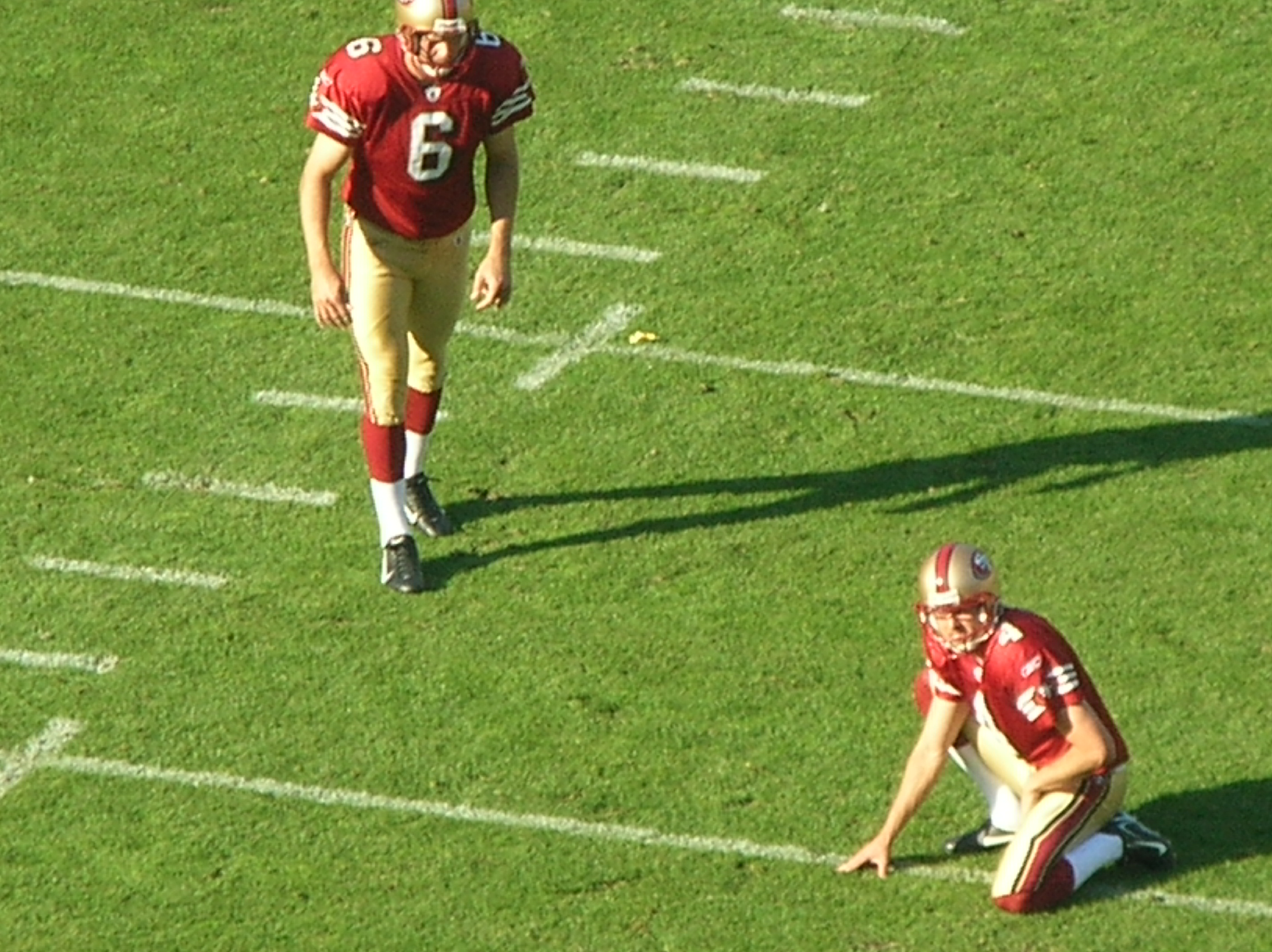
San Francisco 49ers kicker Joe Nedney prepares to kick an extra point with punter Andy Lee as the holder, 2008.

In the NFL, the conversion was required after a touchdown scored during the regulation game (i.e., not overtime), because point differential is used for some tiebreakers in the standings. Rarely, this can result in such an attempt having to be made at the end of the game when it cannot change the outcome of the game; two of the best-known examples of this occurred after the winning touchdown by the Philadelphia Eagles in the December 19, 2010, game known as the Miracle at the New Meadowlands, and after the controversial game-winning touchdown by the Seattle Seahawks on September 24, 2012.

If the game is in sudden death overtime, the extra-point attempt is omitted if the winning score is a touchdown. In American high school and college football, it is likewise omitted following a touchdown on the game's final play if a successful conversion attempt cannot change the outcome of the game.

There is, however, one exception in college football, because the defense can also score two points on a return of a conversion try (and theoretically score a one-point safety) and the NCAA rules state that the conversion try must be run if any subsequent scoring on the play could impact the outcome of the game. Therefore, if a team scores a touchdown to take the lead by one or two points as time expires, they must still attempt the conversion, although most teams will simply opt to take a knee to prevent the risk of the defense scoring. For example, on October 24, 2009, Iowa scored as time expired to take a 15–13 lead over Michigan State. Making the conversion would have made no difference in Iowa winning the game, but Iowa still had to attempt it, so Ricky Stanzi simply knelt down, as a return by Michigan State would have tied the game and forced overtime.

In Canadian football, the scoring team is entitled to a conversion play after scoring with no time on the clock, but may choose to waive it. Because head-to-head points scored is used as a tiebreaker in the standings, they often choose to attempt the conversion when playing an opponent with whom a tie in the standings is possible. As in U.S. college football, Canadian football allows defenses to score two points for the successful return of a convert attempt.

=== 2015–present ===
The CFL and NFL both implemented major changes to how conversions were attempted starting with their respective 2015 seasons.

In the CFL, the line of scrimmage for a kick attempt moved back 20 yards to the 25-yard line (for a 32-yard attempt), while the line of scrimmage for a two-point attempt moved forward two yards to the three-yard line.

In the NFL, the line of scrimmage for a kick attempt moved back 13 yards to the 15-yard line (for a 33-yard attempt), effectively placing the ball the same distance from the goalposts as in the CFL. The line of scrimmage for a two-point attempt remained at the two-yard line. NFL defenses also became able to run back failed conversion attempts for a two-point score. On December 6, 2015, New Orleans Saints linebacker Stephone Anthony became the first player in NFL history to do so, after New Orleans blocked an extra-point kick by the Carolina Panthers. Some broadcasters did not immediately update their in-game graphics programming to account for the scoring of two points for the defensive return of a try, resulting in the score sometimes erroneously being displayed to audiences as a "safety" (which has the same scoring value).

As expected, the 2015 rule changes increased the frequency of two-point conversion attempts, from a rate of about five percent to about eight percent, much of that increase coming from the Pittsburgh Steelers alone.

Starting with the 2018 season, the NFL adopted the CFL rule allowing teams to waive "unnecessary" extra-point attempts at the end of the game, following the Minneapolis Miracle, unless the score margin is within two points.

=== Special overtime rules ===
In most cases in gridiron football, one point may be scored following a touchdown—bringing the total value of the touchdown to seven points—by place kicking the ball through the uprights. Exceptions occur in overtime in some leagues. In American college football and in high school leagues that use college rules, teams in double overtime are required to attempt two-point conversions instead of a one-point conversion after scoring a touchdown. Starting with the third overtime period, college rules require teams to attempt alternating two-point conversions only, so no touchdowns are possible beyond the second overtime. In the CFL, one-point (kicking) converts are not available in overtime; all convert attempts must be for two-point (rushing or passing) converts. Prior to the 2025 NFL season, an overtime game in the NFL regular season would automatically end on a touchdown even on the first possession, so there was never a situation in overtime where a try would have been possible. Since the 2022 NFL season, in the playoffs, both teams have an opportunity to possess the ball no matter what happens on the first possession. Since the 2025 NFL season, this rule has also applied to the regular season. Rich McKay, the chairman of the NFL competition committee, said that coaches were discussing going for two points after a touchdown on their first possession in overtime of a postseason game, as a strategic move.

== Other leagues ==
In 1968, the AFL and NFL eliminated the extra-point kick for interleague preseason games, allowing only one-point scrimmage plays called "Pressure Points"; this was scrapped when both leagues began their regular seasons that year. The World Football League (which called their conversions "Action Points"), Alliance of American Football, and both the 2001 and 2020 incarnations of the XFL did the same in their short lives. The XFL later implemented a variable system that allowed increasing point values (between one and three points) for increasing the distance to the end zone on the attempt for its 2001 playoffs, which carried over into the 2020 league; that system was later adopted by the Stars Football League and, in a reduced form, the Legends Football League. The 2022 incarnation of the United States Football League followed a compromise model in that extra-point kicks were still allowed, but that a conversion could be worth two or three points based on distance. The CFL proposed to test the variable-distance scoring system during the 2015 preseason, but the proposal was rejected. In arena football, two points can also be scored by means of a drop-kicked field goal. The 2024 incarnation of the Arena Football League also adopted a four-point conversion in the same model as the USFL's three-point conversion, a rule originally carried over from Champions Indoor Football. After this rule had a direct impact on the outcome of several games in the 2024 season allowing for sudden 12-point swings in scores, the 2024 AFL's successor Arena Football One dropped the rule in favor of the traditional one- and two-point conversions.

Some youth football leagues award one point for a running conversion and two points for either a passing conversion or kick through the uprights; six-man football follows a similar convention that awards one point for a pass or run and two points for a kick.

In its inaugural 2021 season, the European League of Football, which follows NFL rules on conversions after touchdowns, had both a comparatively high rate of failed PAT attempts – higher than in the concurrent 2021 German Football League season – and a higher rate of two-point conversion attempts than other leagues. Furthermore, some roster moves, like the Barcelona Dragons acquiring NFL alum Giorgio Tavecchio, were seen as attempts to improve both field goal and PAT success rates. In the inaugural championship game, the winning Frankfurt Galaxy scored five touchdowns and opted for two-point conversions after each, bringing their total score to 32 points, as four out of the five conversion attempts failed.

== See also ==
- Comparison of American and Canadian football#Points after touchdown
- Glossary of American football
