= Westview Cemetery (Wadesboro, North Carolina) =

Historic cemetery in North Carolina, United States

- U.S. National Register of Historic Places
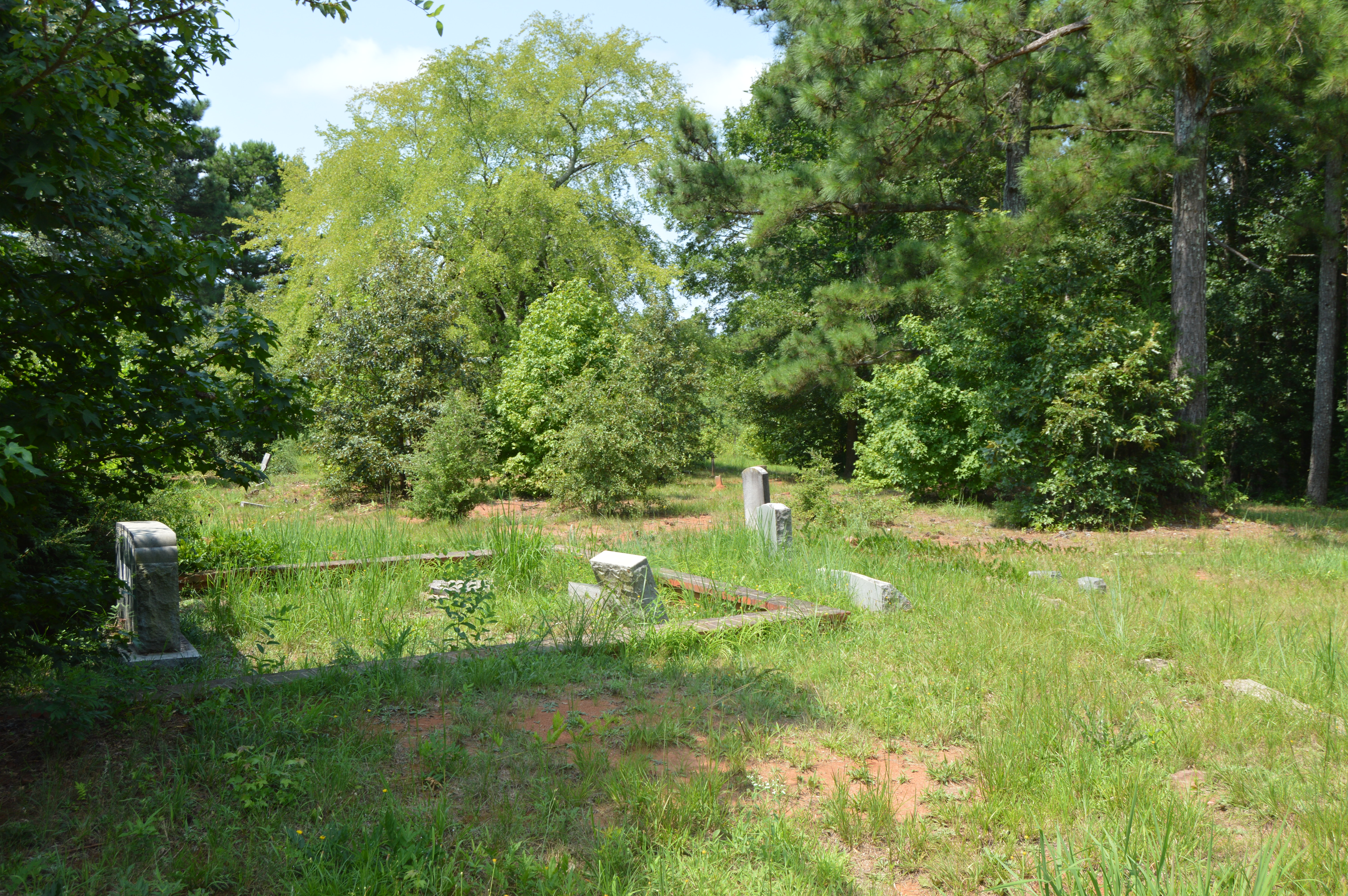
- Graves near the cemetery's northeast

- Location within North Carolina Location within the United States
- Location: West of Madison Ave. and south of Henry St., Wadesboro, North Carolina
- Coordinates: 34°58′13″N 80°05′08″W
- Area: 1 acre (0.40 ha)
- Built: 1898
- NRHP reference No.: 15000201
- Added to NRHP: April 29, 2015

Westview Cemetery is a historic cemetery in Wadesboro, North Carolina. Located on the west side of the town, south of Henry Street and west of Madison Avenue, it is a 5-acre (2.0 ha) parcel, which has historically been used as the burying ground for the community's African-American population. The central portion, about 1 acre (0.40 ha) in size, was the original burying ground laid out in 1898. The only burials known to be of whites are those of the Smith family (marked by an obelisk), whose older family cemetery formed part of the original acquisition.

The historic portion of the cemetery was added to the National Register of Historic Places in 2015.

== See also ==
- National Register of Historic Places listings in Anson County, North Carolina
