= Trinton Sturdivant =

American football player (born 1989)

No. 77
- Position: Offensive tackle

Personal information
- Born: January 19, 1989 (age 37); Wadesboro, North Carolina, U.S.
- Listed height: 6 ft 5 in (1.96 m)
- Listed weight: 310 lb (141 kg)

Career information
- High school: Wadesboro (NC) Anson
- College: Georgia (2007–2011)

Awards and highlights
- Scout.com, Rivals.com Freshman All-America First Team (2007); SEC All-Freshman Team (2007); North Carolina High School Gatorade Player of the Year (2006); USA Today High School All-American Second Team (2006)
- Stats at ESPN

Trinton Sturdivant (born January 18, 1989) is an American former football offensive tackle. He played college football at the University of Georgia. Plagued by injuries, Strudivant retired from football in 2012.

== Early life ==
Sturdivant attended Anson High School in Wadesboro, North Carolina, where he was an All-State offensive lineman. He was a SuperPrep and USA Today All-American and earned an invitation to play in the U.S. Army All-American Bowl.

Considered a four-star recruit by Rivals.com, Sturdivant ranked 14th among offensive guard prospects in the nation.

== College career ==
As a true freshman in 2007, Sturdivant started all 13 games at left tackle for the Georgia Bulldogs. He became the first true freshman to start at that position in a season opener since Mike Fellows in 1989. He subsequently earned Freshman All-American First team honors by Scout.com and Rivals.com.

He missed the 2008 season after undergoing reconstructive surgery on injured left knee. He tore his anterior cruciate ligament in a preseason scrimmage.

He played in the 2009 season opening game against Oklahoma State where he reinjured his left knee. Sturdivant sat the rest of the season out from the injury.

Sturdivant is perhaps best known for his infamous celebration during the 2007 Florida-Georgia football game, where he was shown dancing in front of Florida players after the entire Georgia team stormed the field after their first touchdown of the game. This became known as the "Gator Stomp" as Georgia would go on to win by a score of 42–30.
