= Stephone Anthony =

American football player (born 1992)

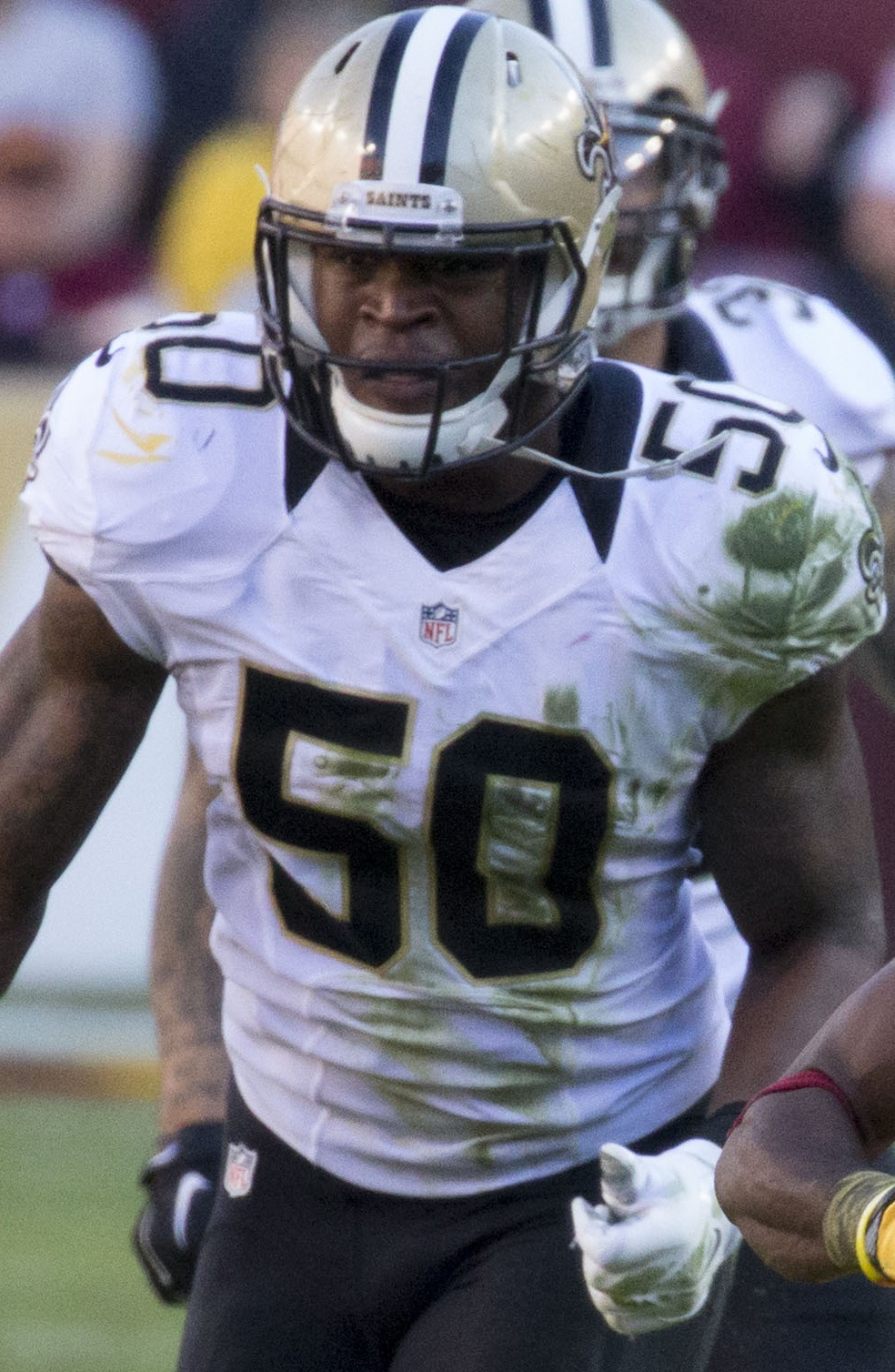
- Anthony with the New Orleans Saints in 2015

Clemson Tigers
- Title: Graduate assistant

Personal information
- Born: July 28, 1992 (age 34); Polkton, North Carolina, U.S.
- Listed height: 6 ft 3 in (1.91 m)
- Listed weight: 245 lb (111 kg)

Career information
- High school: Anson (Wadesboro, North Carolina)
- College: Clemson (2011–2014)
- NFL draft: 2015: 1st round, 31st overall pick

Career history

Playing
- New Orleans Saints (2015–2017); Miami Dolphins (2017–2018); Atlanta Falcons (2019)*; New York Jets (2019)*; New Orleans Saints (2019); Arizona Cardinals (2020)*
- * Offseason or practice squad member only

Coaching
- Clemson (2022–present) Graduate assistant

Awards and highlights
- PFWA All-Rookie Team (2015); First-team All-ACC (2014)

Career NFL statistics
- Total tackles: 152
- Sacks: 1.0
- Forced fumbles: 2
- Fumble recoveries: 1
- Interceptions: 1
- Defensive touchdowns: 1
- Stats at Pro Football Reference

Stephone Anthony (born July 28, 1992) is an American former professional football player who was a linebacker in the National Football League (NFL). He played college football for the Clemson Tigers. After his playing career, he joined Clemson's coaching staff as a graduate assistant.

== Early life ==
A native of Polkton, North Carolina, Anthony attended Anson High School, where he was a four-year starter. Anthony had 123 tackles, 16 tackles for loss, four sacks, and two interceptions as a senior in 2010.

In addition to football, Anthony was also a catcher on the baseball team and a power forward on the basketball team, as well as a track athlete (11.3 s in the 100m).

Regarded as a five-star recruit by Rivals.com, Anthony was rated the No. 3 outside linebackers prospect. He chose Clemson over UNC, Florida, and Virginia Tech.

== College career ==
He appeared in all 13 games in 2011, including three starts. For the season, he registered 32 tackles, six tackles for loss, two sacks, a pass breakup, and a team-high two caused fumbles in 292 snaps. He started seven of 13 games as a sophomore, recording 77 tackles, one sack and an interception. Anthony started all 13 games as a junior in 2013. He recorded a team-high 131 tackles with four sacks and an interception.

== Professional career ==
Pre-draft measurables
Height	Weight	Arm length	Hand span	40-yard dash	10-yard split	20-yard split	20-yard shuttle	Three-cone drill	Vertical jump	Broad jump	Bench press
6 ft 2 5/8 in (1.90 m)	243 lb (110 kg)	32 1/2 in (0.83 m)	10 3/8 in (0.26 m)	4.56 s	1.56 s	2.63 s	4.03 s	7.07 s	37 in (0.94 m)	10 ft 2 in (3.10 m)	23 reps
All values from NFL Combine

=== New Orleans Saints (first stint) ===
==== 2015 ====
Anthony was selected in the first round (31st overall) of the 2015 NFL draft by the New Orleans Saints. The pick originally belonged to the Seattle Seahawks, and was traded to the Saints in the Max Unger-Jimmy Graham trade.

On May 12, 2015, the Saints signed him to a four-year, $7.73 million contract with $6.24 million guaranteed and a signing bonus of $3.38 million.

He recorded his first sack October 4 in the Saint's 26–20 win over the Dallas Cowboys. In a Week 3 game against the Carolina Panthers, Anthony was fined $17,363 for his hit on wide receiver Devin Funchess. During the Saints' Week 12 matchup also against the Carolina Panthers, Anthony stopped running back Jonathan Stewart after a handoff up the middle, stripped the ball, then ran it back for a touchdown. Nobody chased him as everyone assumed the play was dead. In the same game, Anthony also became the first person in NFL history to return a blocked kick for two points after Kevin Williams blocked an extra point, following a rule change that took effect in the offseason to allow such returns. Anthony recorded his 100th tackle in a Week 15 game against the Detroit Lions, where he also forced a fumble. He became the first Saints' rookie to record 100 tackles in a season since Hall of Fame linebacker Rickey Jackson.

Anthony finished his rookie season with 112 tackles, one sack, one interception, and two forced fumbles. He had two scores, both coming against the Carolina Panthers, and led all rookies in tackles. Anthony was also named to the Pro Football Writers Association all-rookie team.

==== 2016 ====
On May 14, 2016, it was announced that Anthony would be moved to strongside linebacker, a position he never played before in the NFL. Anthony would go on to only play in 10 games in the regular season, recording 16 tackles. On December 20 he was placed on the injured reserve list, ending his 2016 season.

=== Miami Dolphins ===
On September 19, 2017, Anthony was traded to the Miami Dolphins for a 2018 fifth-round draft pick.

On May 2, 2018, the Dolphins declined the fifth-year option on Anthony's contract, making him a free agent in 2019.

=== Atlanta Falcons ===
On July 26, 2019, Anthony signed with the Atlanta Falcons. He was released on August 18, 2019.

=== New York Jets ===
On August 20, 2019, Anthony signed with the New York Jets. He was released on August 31, 2019.

=== New Orleans Saints (second stint) ===
On September 25, 2019, Anthony signed with the Saints. He was released on October 16, but was re-signed a week later.

=== Arizona Cardinals ===
On November 16, 2020, Anthony was signed to the practice squad of the Arizona Cardinals. He was released on November 24, 2020.

== NFL career statistics ==
Legend
**Bold**	Career high

Year	Team	Games		Tackles					Interceptions					Fumbles			
Year	Team	GP	GS	Cmb	Solo	Ast	Sck	TFL	Int	Yds	TD	Lng	PD	FF	FR	Yds	TD
2015	NOR	**16**	**16**	**112**	**70**	**42**	**1.0**	**5**	**1**	**5**	0	**5**	**5**	**2**	**1**	**31**	**1**
2016	NOR	10	3	16	12	4	0.0	3	0	0	0	0	0	0	0	0	0
2017	MIA	8	0	15	12	3	0.0	1	0	0	0	0	0	0	0	0	0
2018	MIA	16	0	8	3	5	0.0	0	0	0	0	0	0	0	0	0	0
2019	NOR	12	1	1	0	1	0.0	0	0	0	0	0	0	0	0	0	0
Career		62	20	152	97	55	1.0	9	1	5	0	5	5	2	1	31	1

== Coaching career ==
In 2022, Anthony began his coaching career, joining the staff at his alma mater, Clemson, as a defensive graduate assistant.
