= Anson High School (North Carolina) =

American public school in North Carolina

Location
- 96 Anson High School Rd; Wadesboro, North Carolina 28170; United States; 34°58′39″N 80°06′08″W

Information
- Type: Public
- School district: Anson County Schools
- CEEB code: 344080
- NCES School ID: 370018002054
- Principal: Chris Stinson
- Teaching staff: 45.33 (FTE)
- Enrollment: 689 (2023–2024)
- Student to teacher ratio: 15.20
- Campus type: Rural
- Colors: Orange and blue
- Athletics conference: Southern Carolina
- Mascot: Bearcats
- Website: ahs.ansonschools.org

Anson High School is a public co-educational secondary school located in Wadesboro, North Carolina. It is one of four high schools in the Anson County Schools system.

== School information ==
For the 2010–2011 school year, Anson High School had a total population of 822 students and 57.60 teachers on a full-time equivalent (FTE) basis. The student population had a gender ratio of 48% male to 52% female. The demographic makeup of the student population included: Black, 68.73%; White, 24.33%; Hispanic, 2.92%; Asian/Pacific Islander, 1.70%; and American Indian, 0.61% (two or more races, 1.70%). For the same school year, 75.12% of the students received free and reduced-price lunches.

== Administration ==
The current principal of Anson High School is Chris Stinson.

== Athletics ==
Anson is a member of the North Carolina High School Athletic Association (NCHSAA). The school's mascot is the Bearcats, and its colors are orange and blue.

Anson offers the following sports: cross country, soccer, football, wrestling, volleyball, basketball, baseball, golf, softball, and track & field.

The Anson wrestling team were the North Carolina 4A state tournament champions in 1993 and 1996. The 1993 team was coached by Jack Southern, who was honored in 2017 with the Lifetime Service to Wrestling award by the North Carolina Chapter of the National Wrestling Hall of Fame.

== Notable alumni ==
- Stephone Anthony, NFL linebacker
- Carla Cunningham, American politician, member of the North Carolina House of Representatives
- Montez Ford, professional wrestler, tag team champion in WWE
- Timmy Horne, NFL nose tackle
- Trinton Sturdivant, former collegiate offensive tackle at Georgia
