= Timmy Horne =

American football player (born 1997)

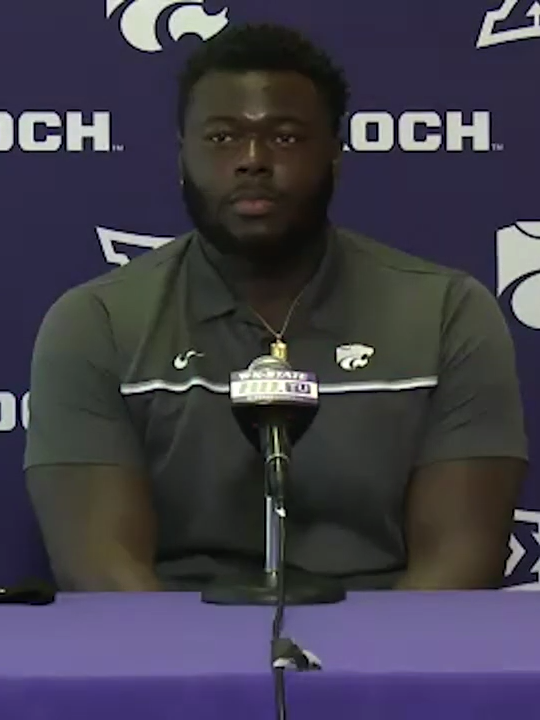
- Horne in 2021

No. 94 – Tennessee Titans
- Position: Nose tackle
- Roster status: Active

Personal information
- Born: October 25, 1997 (age 29); Wadesboro, North Carolina, U.S.
- Listed height: 6 ft 4 in (1.93 m)
- Listed weight: 312 lb (142 kg)

Career information
- High school: Anson (Wadesboro)
- College: Charlotte (2016–2020); Kansas State (2021)
- NFL draft: 2022: undrafted

Career history
- Atlanta Falcons (2022–2023); New York Giants (2023–2024); Tennessee Titans (2025–present)

Career NFL statistics as of 2026
- Total tackles: 33
- Pass deflections: 2
- Stats at Pro Football Reference

Timothy Horne (born October 25, 1997) is an American professional football nose tackle for the Tennessee Titans of the National Football League (NFL). He played college football for the Charlotte 49ers and Kansas State Wildcats. He went undrafted in the 2022 NFL draft and previously played for the Atlanta Falcons.

== Early life ==
Timothy Horne was born on October 27, 1997, to Reva Horne. He was raised in Wadesboro, North Carolina, where he attended Anson High School. While at Anson, Horne was a three-year varsity player for the football team while also playing basketball.

== College career ==
After finishing high school, Horne chose to attend the University of North Carolina at Charlotte. Horne chose to redshirt before his freshman year preceding the 2016 college football season. The following year, Horne started two out of twelve games for Charlotte and had nineteen tackles for the season. As a redshirt sophomore, Horne started all twelve games for Charlotte and recorded 28 tackles with 1.5 sacks. Horne would again start twelve games the next season and achieved a season-high tackle total of 41 with 0.5 sacks. Due to a shortened season because of the COVID-19 pandemic, Horne only played in six games in the 2020 college football season, of which he started in three. Despite this, Horne received Fourth-Team All-Conference USA honors at the conclusion of the season. Horne chose to transfer to Kansas State University and play as a graduate transfer there due to the one year of eligibility extended by the NCAA because of the COVID-19 pandemic before the 2021 college football season.

== Professional career ==
Pre-draft measurables
Height	Weight	Arm length	Hand span	Wingspan	40-yard dash	10-yard split	20-yard split	20-yard shuttle	Three-cone drill	Vertical jump	Broad jump	Bench press
6 ft 4 1/4 in (1.94 m)	323 lb (147 kg)	34 3/4 in (0.88 m)	10 1/8 in (0.26 m)	7 ft 0 1/2 in (2.15 m)	5.24 s	1.87 s	3.06 s	4.80 s	7.42 s	35.0 in (0.89 m)	9 ft 4 in (2.84 m)	28 reps
All values from Pro Day

=== Atlanta Falcons ===
Horne signed with the Atlanta Falcons as an undrafted free agent on April 30, 2022, following the 2022 NFL draft. He made the Falcons' final 53 man roster after training camp.

On August 29, 2023, Horne was waived by the Falcons and re-signed to the practice squad.

=== New York Giants ===
On December 21, 2023, Horne was signed by the New York Giants off the Falcons practice squad. He suffered a torn Achilles in the final preseason game and was waived/injured on August 25, 2024.

=== Tennessee Titans ===
On July 23, 2025, Horne signed with the Tennessee Titans. He was waived on August 27, and re-signed to the practice squad. Horne signed a reserve/future contract with Tennessee on January 5, 2026.

On August 30, 2026, Horne was waived by the Titans as a part of final roster cuts; he was re-signed to the team's practice squad the next day. He was promoted to the active roster on October 24.
