= Anson County Schools =

School district in Anson County, North Carolina, U.S.

Location
- Anson County, North Carolina United States

District information
- Type: Public
- Grades: PK–12
- Superintendent: Dr. Brian C. Ratliff
- Accreditations: Southern Association of Colleges and Schools
- Schools: 9
- Budget: $ 41,424,000
- NCES District ID: 3700180

Students and staff
- Students: 3,282
- Teachers: 248.47 (on FTE basis)
- Staff: 266.57 (on FTE basis)
- Student–teacher ratio: 15.47:1

Other information
- Website: www.ansonschools.org

Anson County Schools is a PK–12 graded school district serving Anson County, North Carolina. Its 9 schools serve 3,282 students as of the 2025-2026 school year.

== History ==
Attempts at common schools began in Anson County as early as the mid-1700s. The Revolutionary War and its aftermath halted progress in this area for a while. Later, many academies and subscription schools abounded in the area. One of the first in the area was Wadesborough Academy which was authorized by the state legislature in 1791. Fundraising was often done by state-authorized lotteries.

Although no records exist that show when the first public schools were officially formed in the county, by 1899 there existed 50 schools for white students and 37 for black students. At that time, the school year was only about three to four months long. They still had 87 schools by 1912 with over 100 teachers. The school year was expanded to six months in the 1920s.

School consolidation began after World War I, culminating in the merger of Wadesboro City Schools into Anson County Schools in 1960, shortly after the consolidation of Anson High School. Bowman High School, named for former long-time superintendent J. O. Bowman opened as an integrated school in 1967, after originally being built to be a segregated school.

Through the 1930s to the 1950s, Anson County Schools was governed by a five-member Board of Education and was divided into six school districts. Each of these districts had a committee authorized to hire their own principals and teachers, as well as set district calendars. During this time the split year schedule was developed because of the rural, farm family demographics of the school students. The school year would start in early July and last for several weeks taking a break in mid August until after harvests were finished. The regular, longer school year would then start in late October.

== Student demographics ==
For the 2025-2026 school year, Anson County Schools had a total population of 3,282 students and 248.47 teachers on a (FTE) basis. This produced a student-teacher ratio of 15.47:1. That same year, out of the total student population, the gender ratio was 50% male to 50% female. The demographic group makeup was: Black, 59%; White, 32%; Hispanic, 3%; Asian/Pacific Islander, 2%; and American Indian, 1% (two or more races: 3%). For the same school year, 76.59% of the students received free and reduced-cost lunches.

== Governance ==
The primary governing body of Anson County Schools follows a council–manager government format with a nine-member Board of Education appointing a Superintendent to run the day-to-day operations of the system. The school system currently resides in the North Carolina State Board of Education's Sixth District.

=== Board of education ===
The Anson County Schools Board of Education elects seven members by district to four-year staggered terms. Two others are elected as at-large members. The board generally meets on the last Monday of each month. The current board is:

District members

- Daniel Wilson (District 1)
- Bobbie Little (District 2) (Vice-Chair)
- Beulah Pratt (District 3)
- Lisa G. Davis (District 4) (Chair)
- Russell Sikes (District 5)
- Michael Livingston (District 6)
- Carol Ann Gibson (District 7)

At-Large members

- Marilynn Bennett
- George Truman

=== Superintendent ===
The current superintendent of Anson County Schools is Dr. Brian C. Ratliff. He has been superintendent since June 1, 2024.

== Member schools ==
Anson County Schools has eleven schools ranging from pre-kindergarten to twelfth grade. Those nine schools are separated into two high schools, one middle school, and six elementary schools.

=== High schools ===
- Anson County Early College (Polkton)
- Anson High School (Wadesboro)

=== Middle school ===
- Anson Middle School (Wadesboro)
- A new 165,000 square foot two-story middle school is set to be built adjacent to Anson High School. The official date for groundbreaking is early 2024. The school board approved the $41,000,000 project during a board meeting in late October 2023. The school will open with 7th & 8th grades and 6th could come at a later date. The school should completed in late 2025.

As of June 11, 2026 the new Anson Middle School is complete and will open to students this August for the 2026-2027 school year.

=== Elementary schools ===
- Ansonville Elementary School (Ansonville)
- Lilesville Elementary School (Lilesville)
- Morven Elementary School (Morven)
- Peachland-Polkton Elementary School (Peachland)
- Wadesboro Elementary School (Wadesboro)
- Wadesboro Primary School (Wadesboro)

== See also ==
- List of school districts in North Carolina
