= United States Post Office (Wadesboro, North Carolina) =

Historic post office in North Carolina, US

- US Post Office
- U.S. National Register of Historic Places
- U.S. Historic district – Contributing property
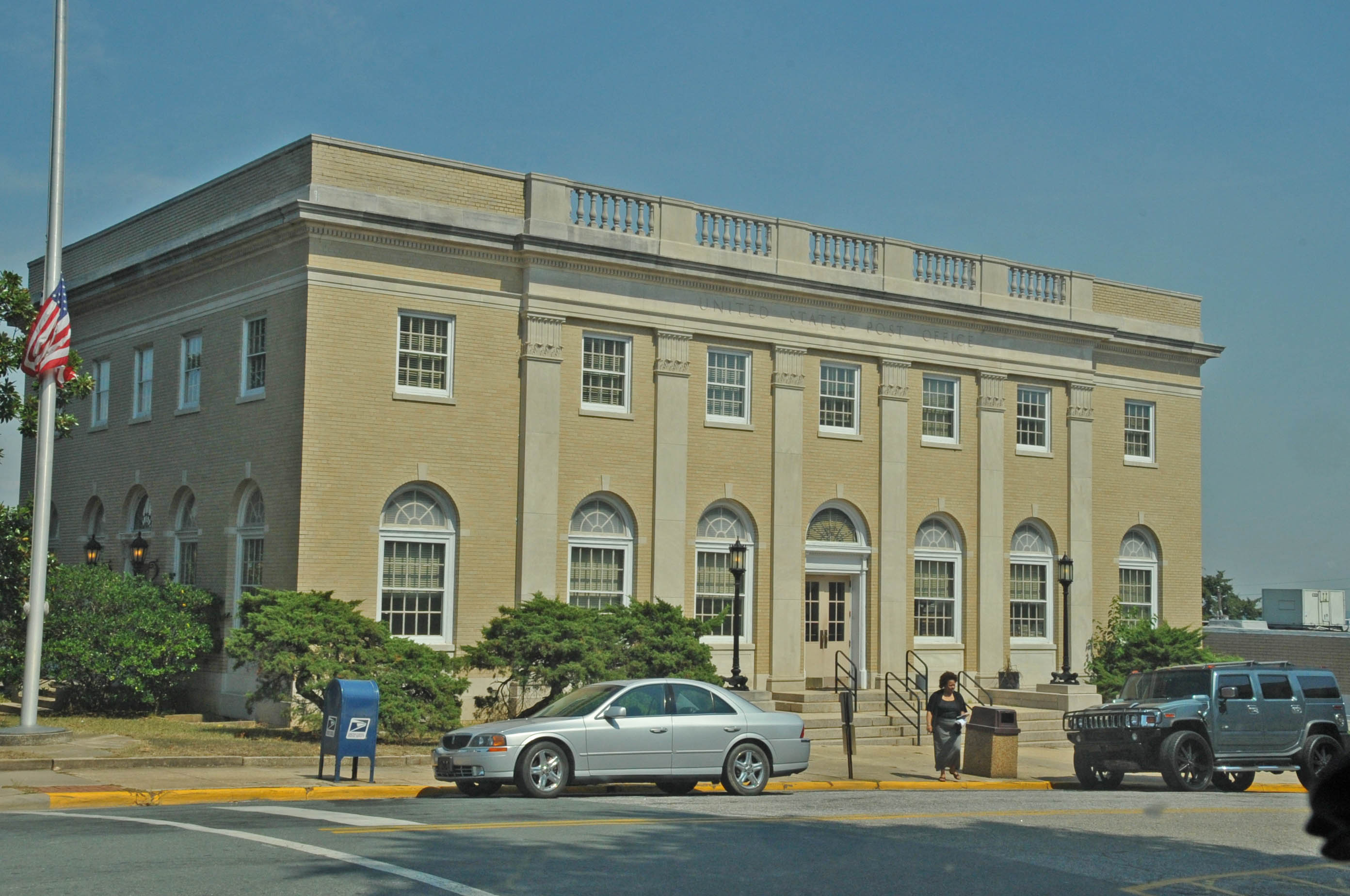
- U.S. Post Office, March 2007

- Location within North Carolina Location within the United States
- Location: 105-111 Martin St., Wadesboro, North Carolina
- Coordinates: 34°58′37″N 80°4′36″W
- Area: less than one acre
- Built: 1932-1933
- Architect: Supervising Architect's Office
- Architectural style: Colonial Revival, Classical Revival
- NRHP reference No.: 87001161
- Added to NRHP: July 6, 1987

United States Post Office is a historic post office building located at Wadesboro, Anson County, North Carolina. It was designed by the Office of the Supervising Architect and built in 1932–1933. It is a two-story rectangular building of cream brick with limestone trim in a Classical / Colonial Revival style. Five central bays of the front facade make up a slightly projecting frontispiece defined by an arcade of six colossal stone pilasters with Greek Corinthian order capitals.

It was listed on the National Register of Historic Places in 1987. It is located in the Wadesboro Downtown Historic District.
