= Boggan-Hammond House and Alexander Little Wing =

Historic house in North Carolina, United States

- U.S. National Register of Historic Places
- U.S. Historic district – Contributing property
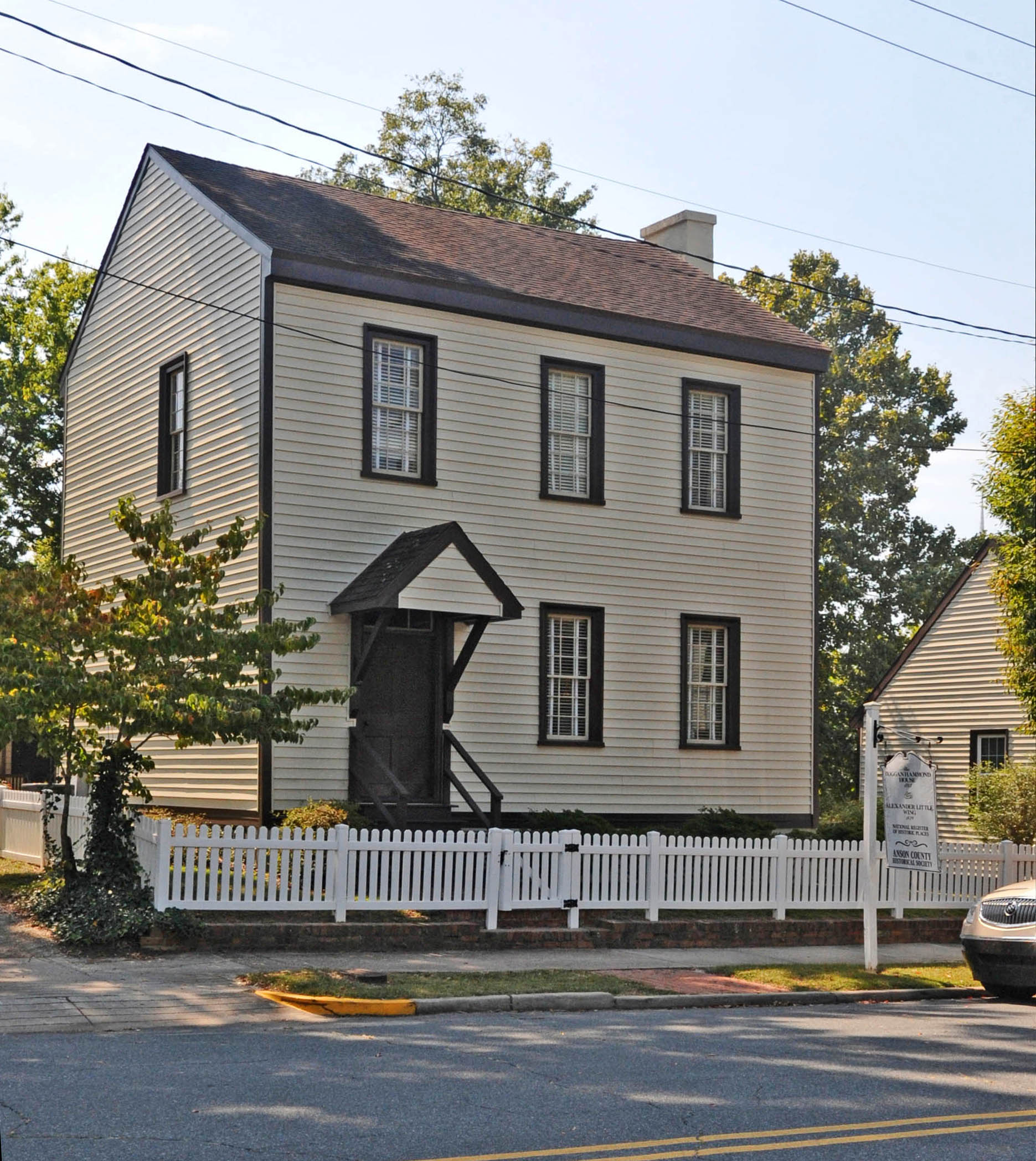
- Boggan-Hammond House and Alexander Little Wing, March 2007

- Location within North Carolina Location within the United States
- Location: 210 Wade St., Wadesboro, North Carolina
- Coordinates: 34°57′54″N 80°4′51″W
- Area: 1 acre (0.40 ha)
- Built: c. 1787
- Architectural style: Federal
- NRHP reference No.: 72000923
- Added to NRHP: September 14, 1972

Boggan-Hammond House and Alexander Little Wing is a historic home located at Wadesboro, Anson County, North Carolina.

The original section was built about 1787, and is a restored one-story frame Federal style structure. The house was built by Captain Patrick Boggan, a Revolutionary War veteran who was one of the founders of the town of Wadesboro, for his daughter, Nellie. A two-story frame wing was added in 1839.

In the 20th century the original house was separated from the wing and placed behind it. The buildings were opened to the public as house museums in 1970. It was listed on the National Register of Historic Places in 1972. It is located in the Wadesboro Downtown Historic District, on East Wade Street (County Road 1135), and is in the care of the Anson County Historical Society.

== Gallery ==
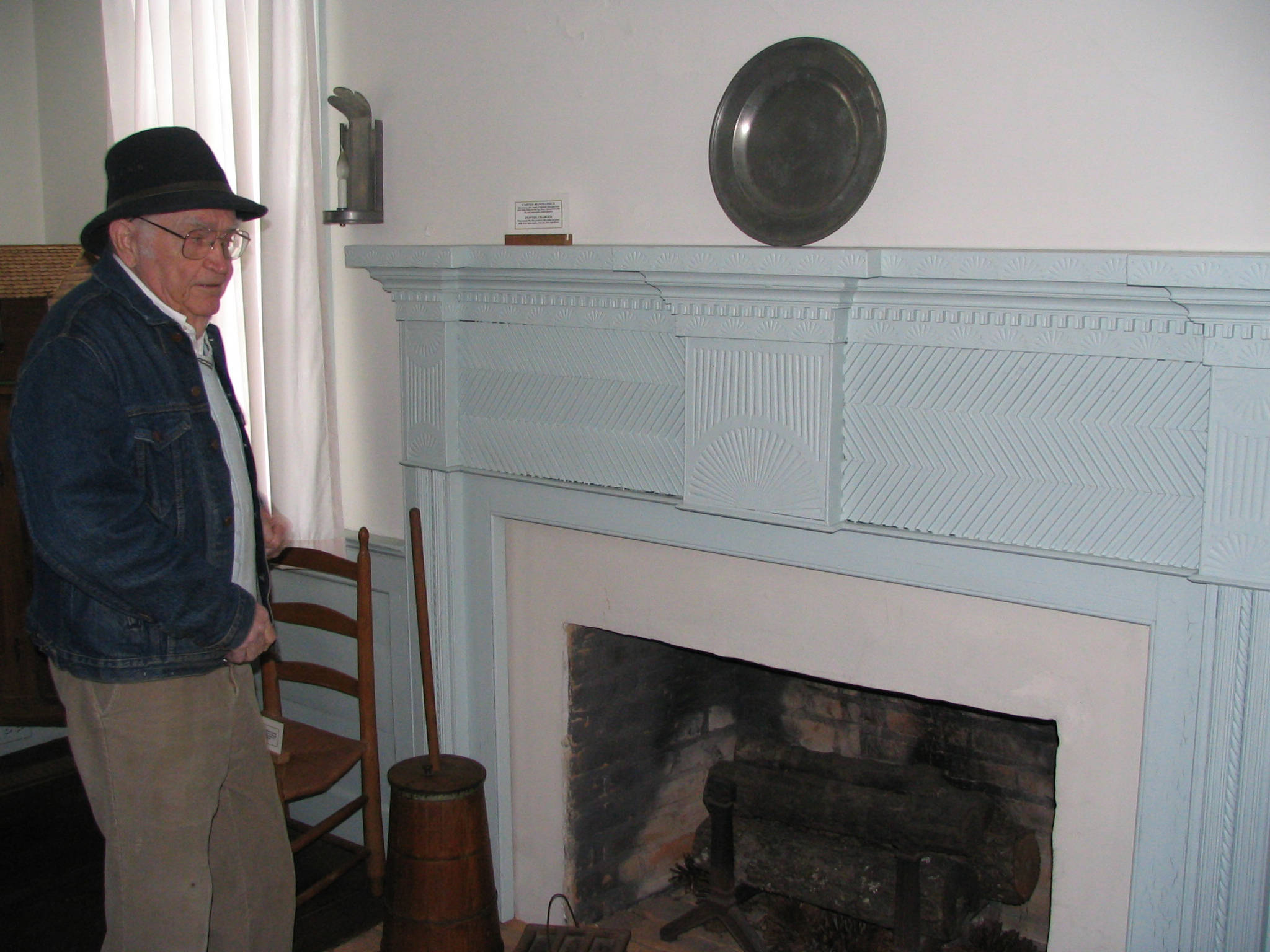

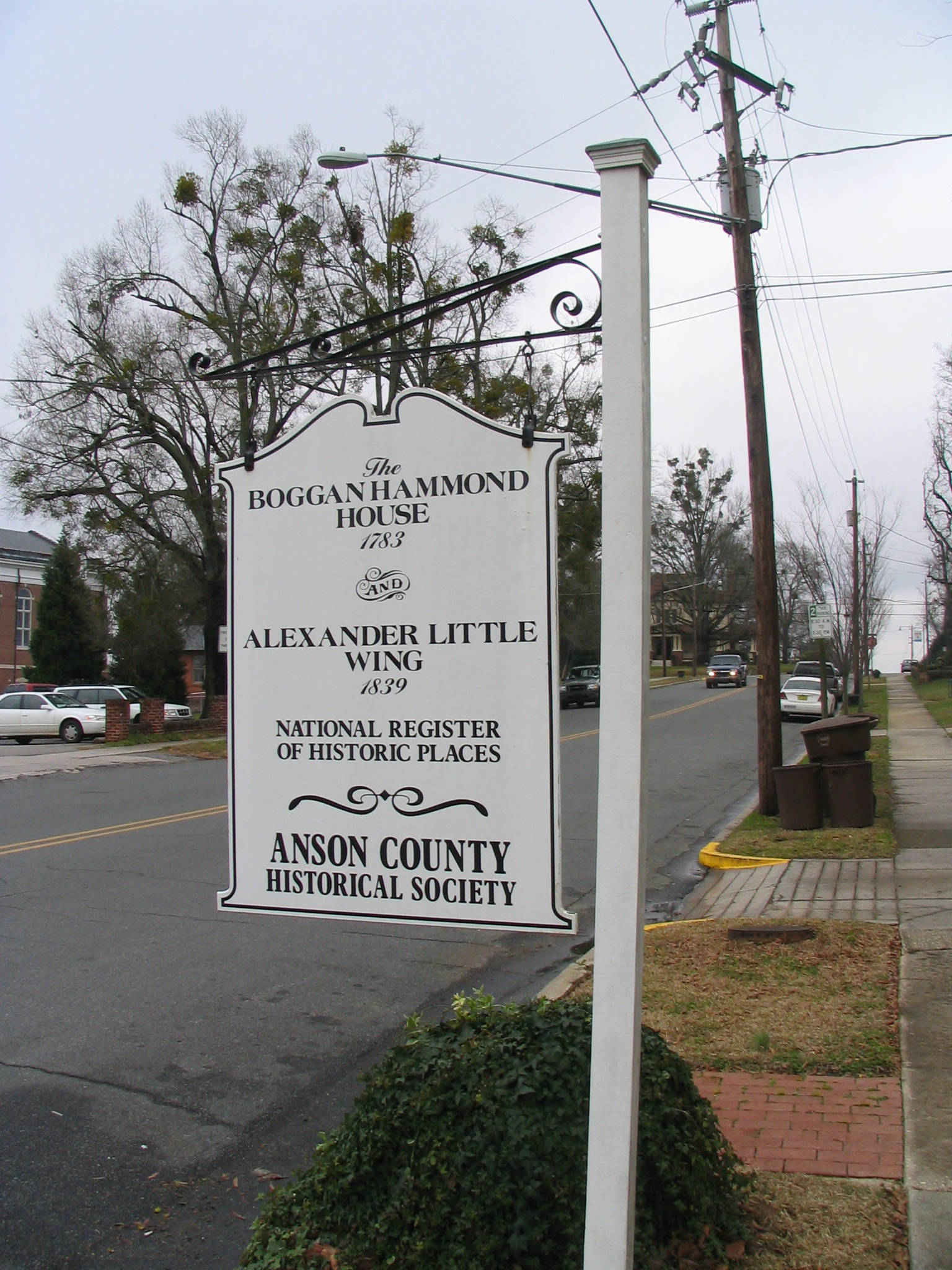
