= Wadesboro, North Carolina =

- Town
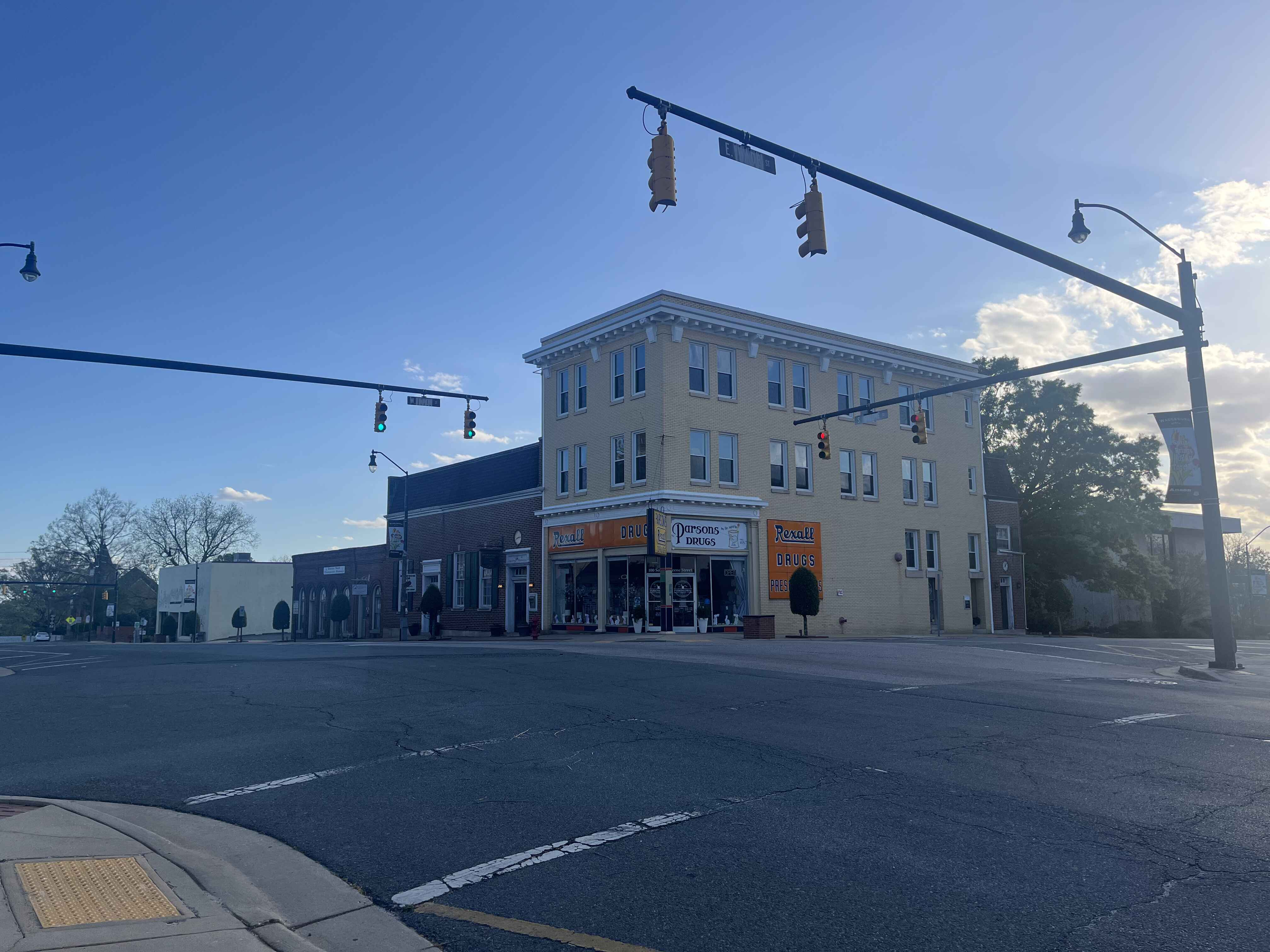

- Flag Seal
- Nickname: The Heart of the Carolinas
- Motto: "Where Small Town Warmth Has Been a Tradition Since 1783"
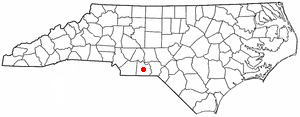
- Location within the state of North Carolina

- Location within the United States
- Coordinates: 34°57′53″N 80°04′29″W
- Country: United States
- State: North Carolina
- County: Anson
- Township: Wadesboro
- Founded: 1783
- Founder: Patrick Boggan
- Named for: Thomas Wade

Government
  - Type: Council–Manager
  - Mayor: John I. Ballard (I)

Area
  - Total: 6.61 sq mi (17.12 km^{2})
  - Land: 6.59 sq mi (17.08 km^{2})
  - Water: 0.012 sq mi (0.03 km^{2})
- Elevation: 525 ft (160 m)

Population (2020)
  - Total: 5,008
  - Density: 759.3/sq mi (293.16/km^{2})
- Time zone: UTC-5 (Eastern (EST))
  - Summer (DST): UTC-4 (EDT)
- ZIP code(s): 28135, 28170
- Area code: 704
- FIPS code: 37-70380
- GNIS feature ID: 2406812
- Website: www.wadesboronc.gov

Wadesboro is a town in and the county seat of Anson County, North Carolina, United States. The population was 5,008 at the 2020 census. The town was originally found in 1783 as New Town but changed by the North Carolina General Assembly to Wadesboro in 1787 to honor Colonel Thomas Wade, a native son, state legislator, and Revolutionary War commander of the Anson County Regiment.

== History ==
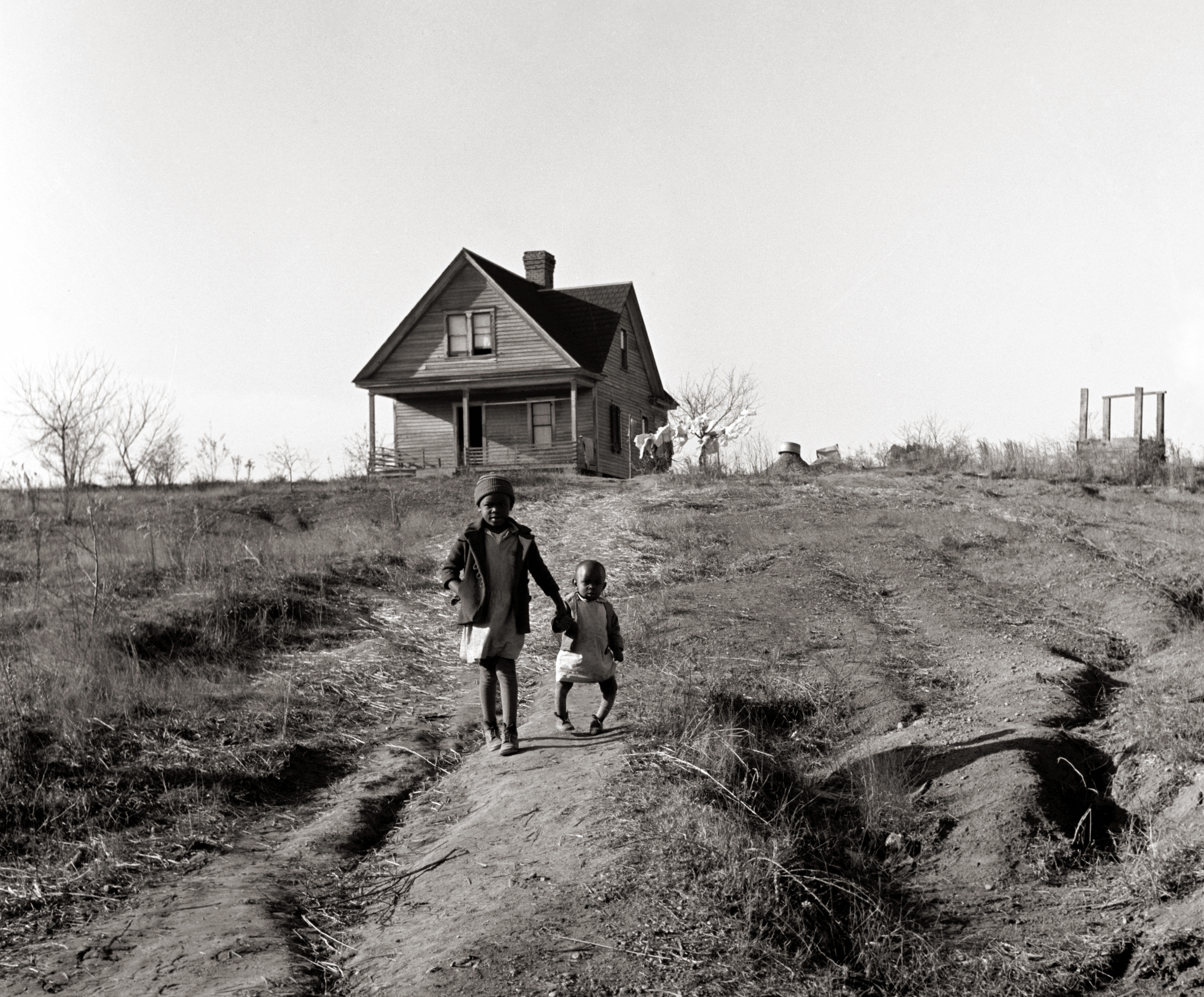
Children in Wadesboro, 1938. Photo by Marion Post Wolcott.

Originally named Newtown, the town was renamed by the North Carolina General Assembly in 1787 in honor of Colonel Thomas Wade after his service with the Anson County Regiment of militia in the American Revolutionary War.

In 1900, astronomers determined that Wadesboro would be the best location in North America for viewing a total solar eclipse. The Smithsonian Astrophysical Observatory, then based in Washington, D.C., loaded several railroad cars with scientific equipment and headed to the town.

The Boggan-Hammond House and Alexander Little Wing, United States Post Office, and Wadesboro Downtown Historic District are listed on the National Register of Historic Places.

== Geography ==
According to the U.S. Census Bureau, the town has a total area of 6.3 square miles (16.4 km^{2}), of which 0.012 square miles (0.03 km^{2}), or 0.20%, is water.

Wadesboro is situated 19 miles (31 km) west of Rockingham, 23 miles (37 km) north of Cheraw, 28 miles (45 km) east of Monroe, and 30 miles (48 km) south of Albemarle.

=== Climate ===
Climate data for Wadesboro, North Carolina (1991–2020)
Month	Jan	Feb	Mar	Apr	May	Jun	Jul	Aug	Sep	Oct	Nov	Dec	Year
Mean daily maximum °F (°C)	52.8 (11.6)	56.5 (13.6)	64.3 (17.9)	73.7 (23.2)	80.5 (26.9)	87.4 (30.8)	90.7 (32.6)	89.1 (31.7)	83.6 (28.7)	74.2 (23.4)	63.9 (17.7)	55.8 (13.2)	72.7 (22.6)
Daily mean °F (°C)	42.3 (5.7)	45.4 (7.4)	52.7 (11.5)	61.5 (16.4)	69.5 (20.8)	76.9 (24.9)	80.5 (26.9)	78.9 (26.1)	73.1 (22.8)	62.5 (16.9)	52.3 (11.3)	45.2 (7.3)	61.7 (16.5)
Mean daily minimum °F (°C)	31.8 (−0.1)	34.3 (1.3)	41.1 (5.1)	49.3 (9.6)	58.4 (14.7)	66.5 (19.2)	70.3 (21.3)	68.7 (20.4)	62.7 (17.1)	50.7 (10.4)	40.6 (4.8)	34.6 (1.4)	50.8 (10.4)
Average precipitation inches (mm)	4.07 (103)	3.20 (81)	3.81 (97)	3.37 (86)	3.29 (84)	4.36 (111)	5.19 (132)	4.79 (122)	4.71 (120)	3.82 (97)	3.59 (91)	3.58 (91)	47.78 (1,215)
Average snowfall inches (cm)	1.9 (4.8)	0.9 (2.3)	0.2 (0.51)	0.0 (0.0)	0.0 (0.0)	0.0 (0.0)	0.0 (0.0)	0.0 (0.0)	0.0 (0.0)	0.0 (0.0)	0.0 (0.0)	0.2 (0.51)	3.2 (8.12)
Source: NOAA

== Demographics ==
Historical population
Census	Pop.	Note	%±
1850	460		—
1870	480		—
1880	800		66.7%
1890	1,198		49.8%
1900	1,546		29.0%
1910	2,376		53.7%
1920	2,648		11.4%
1930	3,124		18.0%
1940	3,587		14.8%
1950	3,408		−5.0%
1960	3,744		9.9%
1970	3,977		6.2%
1980	4,206		5.8%
1990	3,645		−13.3%
2000	3,552		−2.6%
2010	5,813		63.7%
2020	5,008		−13.8%
2021 (est.)	5,038	▲	0.6%
U.S. Decennial Census

=== 2020 census ===
Wadesboro racial composition
Race	Number	Percentage
White (non-Hispanic)	1,610	32.15%
Black or African American (non-Hispanic)	3,066	61.88%
Native American	18	0.36%
Asian	66	1.32%
Other/Mixed	126	2.52%
Hispanic or Latino	89	1.78%

As of the 2020 census, Wadesboro had a population of 5,008. There were 2,002 households and 1,164 families residing in the town.

The median age was 42.7 years. 22.4% of residents were under the age of 18 and 21.5% of residents were 65 years of age or older. For every 100 females there were 87.6 males, and for every 100 females age 18 and over there were 81.7 males age 18 and over.

96.2% of residents lived in urban areas, while 3.8% lived in rural areas.

Of households in Wadesboro, 30.3% had children under the age of 18 living in them. Of all households, 27.4% were married-couple households, 20.4% were households with a male householder and no spouse or partner present, and 45.9% were households with a female householder and no spouse or partner present. About 34.2% of all households were made up of individuals and 15.9% had someone living alone who was 65 years of age or older.

There were 2,368 housing units, of which 15.5% were vacant. The homeowner vacancy rate was 3.4% and the rental vacancy rate was 9.0%.

=== 2010 census ===
As of the census of 2010, there were 5,813 people, 2,303 households, and 1,428 families residing in the town. The population density was 921.2 inhabitants per square mile (355.7/km^{2}). There were 2,692 housing units at an average density of 426.6 per square mile (164.7/km^{2}). The racial makeup of the town was 35.6% White, 60.7% African American, 0.2% Native American, 1.4% Asian, 0.9% some other race, and 1.3% from two or more races. Hispanic or Latino of any race were 1.8% of the population.

There were 2,303 households, out of which 32.0% had children under the age of 18 living with them, 31.1% were headed by married couples living together, 25.7% had a female householder with no husband present, and 38.0% were non-families. 34.5% of all households were made up of individuals, and 16.3% were someone living alone who was 65 years of age or older. The average household size was 2.40, and the average family size was 3.09.

In the town, the population was spread out, with 24.6% under the age of 18, 8.6% from 18 to 24, 23.1% from 25 to 44, 24.8% from 45 to 64, and 19.0% who were 65 years of age or older. The median age was 39.8 years. For every 100 females there were 81.9 males. For every 100 females age 18 and over, there were 76.5 males.

For the period 2007–11, the estimated median annual income for a household in the town was $32,550, and the median income for a family was $34,522. Male full-time workers had a median income of $38,385 versus $29,297 for females. The per capita income for the town was $17,055. About 19.0% of families and 22.8% of the population were below the poverty line, including 39.1% of those under age 18 and 11.1% of those age 65 or over.

== Education ==
Wadesboro is served by the Anson County School District. The District includes Anson High School.

The Anson County School system and the Wadesboro Rotary Club collaborated to make the Rotary Planetarium and Science Center available to students.

== Art and Culture ==
The Ansonia Theater was built in 1925.

There are four museums, which are managed by The Anson County Historical Society:

- The Leavitt House
- The Boggan-Hammond House
- The Alexander Little Wing
- The Ashe-Covington Medical Museum.

== Media ==
- The Anson Record

Television stations available are from the Charlotte Designated Market Area, which Anson County and Wadesboro are a part of. Additionally, the local cable provider carries one station from Columbia, South Carolina, WIS-TV.

== Notable people ==
- Thomas Samuel Ashe, congressman from North Carolina; practiced law in Wadesboro
- Hugh Hammond Bennett, founder of the Soil Conservation Service, now Natural Resources Conservation Service, president of the Association of American Geographers
- Risden Tyler Bennett, congressman
- Tom Brewer, baseball player
- John Culpepper, congressman from North Carolina
- Edmund Strother Dargan, congressman from Alabama and representative to the Confederate States Congress during the American Civil War
- Thomas F. Davis, fifth Episcopal bishop of South Carolina; deacon at Calvary Church in Wadesboro
- Ed Emory, football player and coach
- Blind Boy Fuller, musician
- John Gaddy, baseball player
- Pryor A. Gibson, III, eight-term member of North Carolina General Assembly
- John T. Henley, member of the North Carolina House of Representatives and North Carolina Senate
- Timmy Horne, nose tackle for the Atlanta Falcons
- Alvin Paul Kitchin, congressman from North Carolina; practiced law in Wadesboro
- Leon Levine, founder of Family Dollar variety store chain
- James A. Lockhart, congressman from North Carolina; lived in Wadesboro
- Elizabeth Reid Murray, historian and preservationist
- Gary Porter, former driver of the Carolina Crusher and Grave Digger Monster Truck
- Sylvester "Junkyard Dog" Ritter, professional wrestler
- Cornelius Robinson, member of Provisional Confederate Congress
- Leonidas D. Robinson, congressman from North Carolina
- Jerome Robinson, baseball player
- Will Robinson, basketball player
- Trinton Sturdivant, football player
- Hoyt Patrick Taylor, 21st lieutenant governor of North Carolina; former mayor of Wadesboro
- Hoyt Patrick Taylor Jr., speaker of the North Carolina House of Representatives and 26th lieutenant governor of North Carolina
- William L. Terry, congressman from Arkansas
- John Threadgill, Oklahoma and Texas politician
- Colonel Thomas Wade, Revolutionary War hero and legislator

== In popular culture ==
Horror film Evil Dead II was filmed in Wadesboro, and the Huntley House became the production office for the film. Most of Evil Dead II was filmed in the woods near that farmhouse, or J.R. Faison Junior High School, which is where the interior cabin set was located.

== See also ==
- List of municipalities in North Carolina
- National Register of Historic Places listings in Anson County, North Carolina
