= Wadesboro Downtown Historic District =

Historic district in North Carolina, United States

- U.S. National Register of Historic Places
- U.S. Historic district
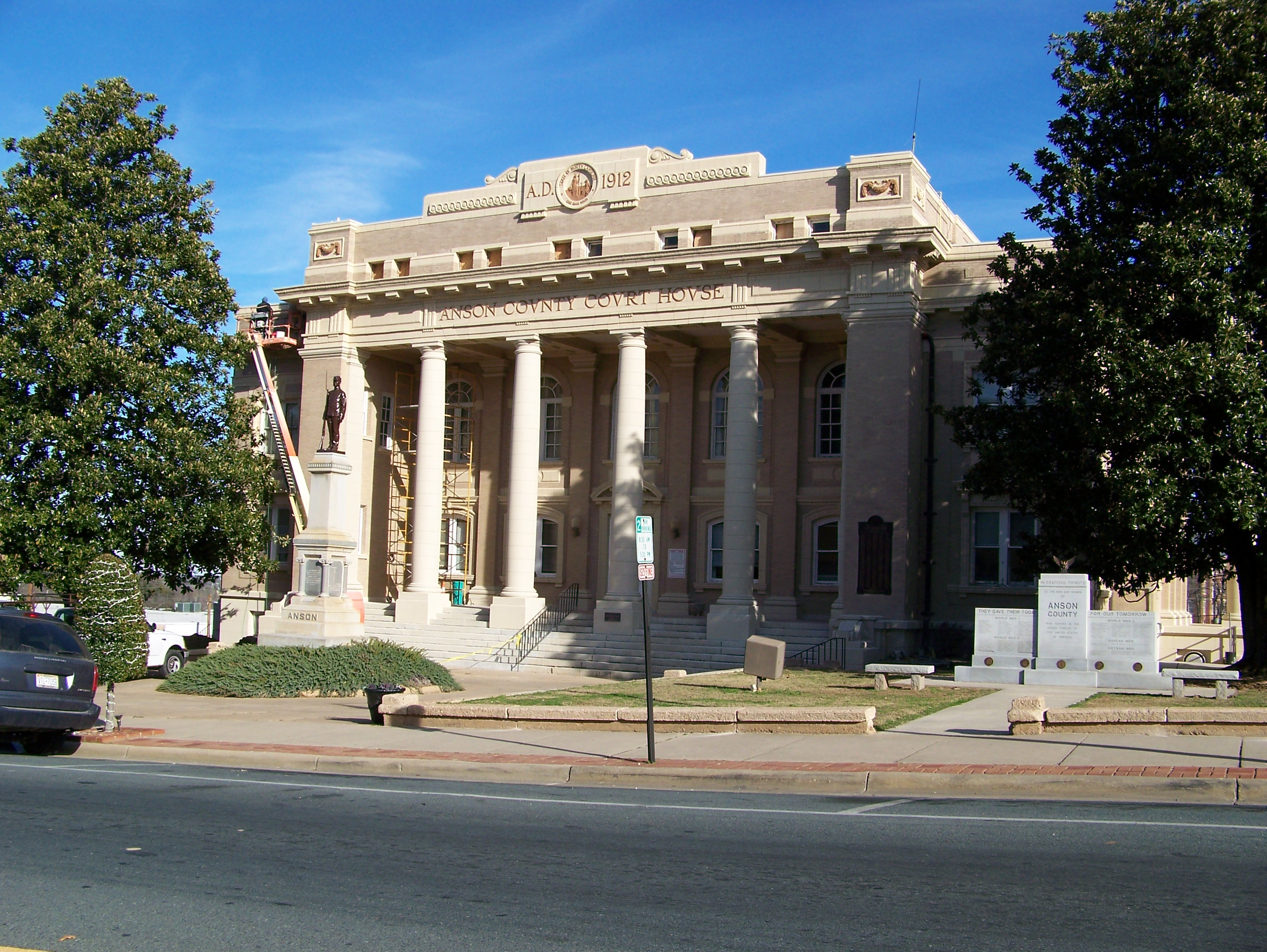
- Anson County Courthouse, included in the district

- Location within North Carolina Location within the United States
- Location: Roughly bounded by Martin, Rutherford, Morgan, Lee, and Brent Sts., Wadesboro, North Carolina
- Coordinates: 34°57′57″N 80°4′37″W
- Area: 32 acres (13 ha)
- Built: 1783
- Architect: Wheeler & Stern; et al.
- Architectural style: Colonial Revival, Gothic Revival
- NRHP reference No.: 99000425
- Added to NRHP: April 1, 1999

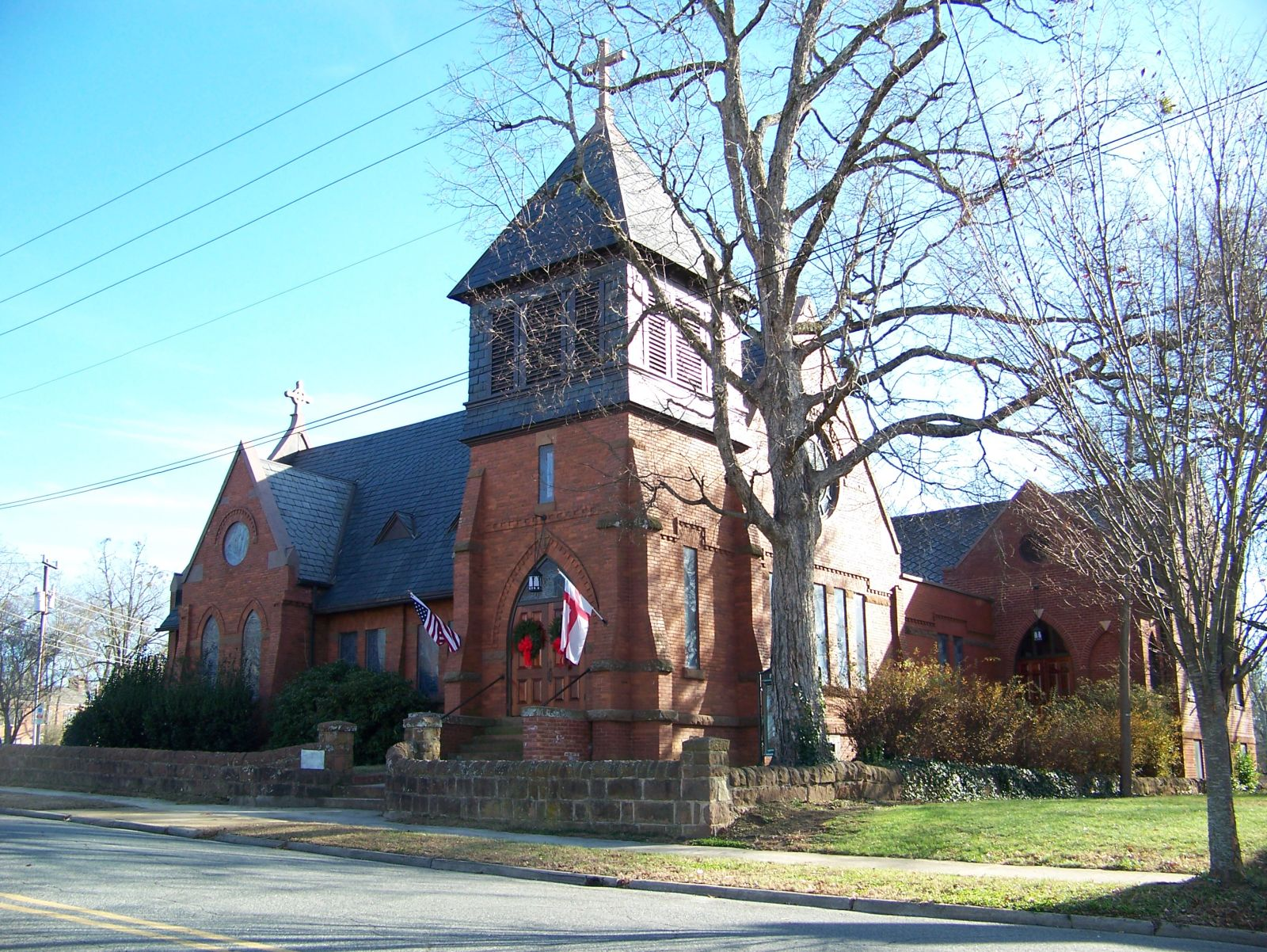
Calvary Episcopal Church

The Wadesboro Downtown Historic District is a 32-acre (13 ha) national historic district located at Wadesboro, Anson County, North Carolina. It included 81 contributing buildings, one contributing structure and one contributing object (Confederate Memorial Monument) in the governmental and commercial core of the City of Wadesboro. It includes work by architects Wheeler & Stern. Notable buildings include the Anson County Courthouse (1914), U.S. Post Office, the Boggan-Hammond House and Alexander Little Wing, the Burns Inn (now the Leavitt Funeral Home), Parsons Pharmacy, Leak's Hardware Company Building, and the Ansonia Theater.

It was listed on the National Register of Historic Places in 1999.
