= List of townships in North Carolina =

North Carolina townships

North Carolina townships
- Map of the 1,035 townships in North Carolina
- Category: Lower-level administrative division
- Location: North Carolina
- Created: 1868
- Number: 1,035
- Populations: 0 (Portsmouth Township) – 874,579 (Township 1, Charlotte)
- Areas: 1.6 square miles (4.1 km^{2}) (Boone Township) – 297.7 square miles (771 km^{2}) (Township 1, Charlotte)
- Government: Township government

The U.S. state of North Carolina is divided into 1,035 townships in 100 counties.

== History ==
North Carolina's 1868 constitution adopted a "Township and County Commissioner Plan" for structuring local government, largely inspired by provisions in Pennsylvania's constitution. Townships were created under the county unit of government, with every county divided into them, and each given their own township board. The boards comprised two justices of the peace and a clerk each elected to a two-year term, and together they were responsible for roads, township finances, and property tax assessments. Townships also elected constables and three-person local school committees. The creation of townships was designed to disrupt the control of political life planter elites exercised over counties in the antebellum period and give citizens an opportunity to participate more in government.

While disliked by white supremacists and opponents of Reconstruction policies from their onset, the creation of townships initially met little public resistance. As more blacks began to be elected to local offices, white supremacists became more determined to eliminate the townships. After "Redeemers" took control of state government in 1874, they turned their focus to eliminating local centers of black political influence. The Redeemers convened a constitutional convention in 1875 to repeal Reconstruction policies. Originally seeking to totally eliminate townships, they were forced to compromise due to stiff opposition and added provisions to the constitution which allowed the North Carolina General Assembly to void townships' powers. By 1880, townships' authority had been largely stripped at the benefit of county governments.

In the 1890s, a Fusionist coalition comprising Republicans and Populists briefly took control of state government. The Republicans wanted to restore townships' powers but were unable to do so due to a lack of support from the Populists. By the early 20th century, townships were mostly reduced to administrative divisions with minimal political significance. They retained some authority in road construction and repair through the 1920s.

== Current legal status ==
North Carolina's townships were never legally repealed and thus continue to persist, mostly as geographic divisions without much legal significance. They are presently used for administrative purposes such as categorizing land deeds, organizing tax collection and voting precincts, and informing the creation of fire and school districts. State law allows county boards of commissioners to rename, create, and abolish townships. The only county to have abolished its townships is Cleveland County.

== List ==
The townships of Cleveland County are not listed below.

| Township | County | 2010 Census |
|---|---|---|
| Abbotts | Bladen | 1,094 |
| Abbotts Creek | Davidson | 12,846 |
| Abbotts Creek | Forsyth | 11,310 |
| Ahoskie | Hertford | 8,620 |
| Albertson | Duplin | 3,878 |
| Albright | Chatham | 2,584 |
| Alfordsville | Robeson | 2,146 |
| Alleghany | Davidson | 710 |
| Allendale | Hoke | 722 |
| Allensville | Person | 3,136 |
| Alligator | Tyrrell | 330 |
| Almond | Stanly | 3,326 |
| Altamont | Avery | 1,297 |
| Anderson | Caswell | 2,172 |
| Anderson Creek | Harnett | 14,060 |
| Ansonville | Anson | 1,698 |
| Antioch | Hoke | 4,185 |
| Antioch | Wilkes | 1,103 |
| Arcadia | Davidson | 10,799 |
| Arthur | Pitt | 6,050 |
| Asheboro | Randolph | 23,561 |
| Asheville | Buncombe | 16,075 |
| Atlantic | Carteret | 694 |
| Atlantic | Dare | 17,809 |
| Atwell | Rowan | 12,428 |
| Averasboro | Harnett | 13,018 |
| Avery Creek | Buncombe | 6,968 |
| Ayden | Pitt | 7,525 |
| Back Creek | Randolph | 5,131 |
| Back Swamp | Robeson | 5,215 |
| Bailey | Nash | 4,397 |
| Bakersville | Mitchell | 1,810 |
| Bald Mountain | Watauga | 619 |
| Baldwin | Chatham | 7,605 |
| Bandy's | Catawba | 4,864 |
| Banner | Johnston | 6,833 |
| Banner Elk | Avery | 2,996 |
| Barbecue | Harnett | 17,033 |
| Barkers Creek | Jackson | 1,839 |
| Barringer | Iredell | 6,533 |
| Bartons Creek | Wake | 22,055 |
| Bath | Beaufort | 4,649 |
| Bear Creek | Chatham | 3,602 |
| Beargrass | Martin | 2,065 |
| Beaufort | Carteret | 8,650 |
| Beaver Creek | Wilkes | 600 |
| Beaverdam | Cherokee | 797 |
| Beaver Dam | Cumberland | 1,559 |
| Beaverdam | Haywood | 12,801 |
| Beaverdam | Richmond | 3,676 |
| Beaverdam | Watauga | 1,351 |
| Beaver Island | Stokes | 3,707 |
| Beech Mountain | Avery | 672 |
| Belews Creek | Forsyth | 6,160 |
| Belvidere | Perquimans | 1,302 |
| Belvoir | Pitt | 9,334 |
| Belvoir | Sampson | 2,160 |
| Bentonville | Johnston | 1,929 |
| Bethania | Forsyth | 9,200 |
| Bethany | Iredell | 7,277 |
| Bethel | Bladen | 4,467 |
| Bethel | Perquimans | 3,848 |
| Bethel | Pitt | 2,470 |
| Beulah | Johnston | 4,311 |
| Big Creek | Stokes | 2,023 |
| Big Lick | Stanly | 5,125 |
| Bingham | Orange | 6,527 |
| Biscoe | Montgomery | 5,765 |
| Black Creek | Wilson | 4,087 |
| Black Jack | Richmond | 513 |
| Black Mountain | Buncombe | 13,416 |
| Black River | Cumberland | 2,180 |
| Black River | Harnett | 10,373 |
| Bladenboro | Bladen | 6,009 |
| Blowing Rock | Watauga | 2,715 |
| Blue Ridge | Henderson | 11,172 |
| Blue Ridge | Watauga | 4,211 |
| Blue Springs | Hoke | 1,628 |
| Bogue | Columbus | 3,058 |
| Bolton | Columbus | 1,611 |
| Boomer | Wilkes | 2,286 |
| Boone | Davidson | 4,753 |
| Boone | Watauga | 9,379 |
| Boon Hill | Johnston | 7,283 |
| Boonville | Yadkin | 4,179 |
| Boyd | Transylvania | 3,694 |
| Brackett | McDowell | 476 |
| Bradshaw | Mitchell | 399 |
| Brassfield | Granville | 12,180 |
| Brasstown | Clay | 2,014 |
| Brevard | Transylvania | 11,623 |
| Brinkleyville | Halifax | 5,159 |
| Britts | Robeson | 3,445 |
| Broadbay | Forsyth | 2,002 |
| Broad River | Buncombe | 1,763 |
| Brogden | Wayne | 21,881 |
| Brower | Randolph | 1,409 |
| Brown Marsh | Bladen | 1,865 |
| Bruce | Guilford | 9,768 |
| Brush Creek | Yancey | 523 |
| Brushy Fork | Watauga | 4,935 |
| Brushy Mountain | Wilkes | 551 |
| Bryan | Surry | 2,747 |
| Buckhorn | Harnett | 2,435 |
| Buckhorn | Wake | 3,251 |
| Buck Swamp | Wayne | 7,157 |
| Buford | Union | 10,323 |
| Bug Hill | Columbus | 2,892 |
| Bull Head | Greene | 1,574 |
| Burgaw | Pender | 8,405 |
| Burningtown | Macon | 894 |
| Burnsville | Anson | 1,942 |
| Burnsville | Yancey | 4,409 |
| Burnt Swamp | Robeson | 2,606 |
| Bushy Fork | Person | 2,516 |
| Butterwood | Halifax | 568 |
| Calahaln | Davie | 2,673 |
| Caldwell | Catawba | 7,722 |
| Camp Creek | Rutherford | 1,299 |
| Canada | Jackson | 640 |
| Cane Creek | Mitchell | 771 |
| Cane River | Yancey | 1,880 |
| Canetuck | Pender | 370 |
| Caney Fork | Jackson | 738 |
| Cape Fear | Chatham | 1,323 |
| Cape Fear | New Hanover | 18,388 |
| Carey's Flat | Avery | 132 |
| Carolina | Pitt | 2,070 |
| Carr | Durham | 3,064 |
| Carrs | Greene | 839 |
| Cartoogechaye | Macon | 2,436 |
| Carvers Creek | Bladen | 1,884 |
| Carvers Creek | Cumberland | 22,866 |
| Cary | Wake | 74,074 |
| Cashiers | Jackson | 1,974 |
| Castalia | Nash | 2,030 |
| Caswell | Pender | 1,418 |
| Cataloochee | Haywood | 37 |
| Catawba | Catawba | 8,490 |
| Catawba Springs | Lincoln | 22,548 |
| Catheys Creek | Transylvania | 3,821 |
| Cecil | Haywood | 504 |
| Cedar Creek | Cumberland | 12,586 |
| Cedar Fork | Wake | 40,841 |
| Cedar Grove | Orange | 5,222 |
| Cedar Grove | Randolph | 8,947 |
| Cedar Island | Carteret | 327 |
| Cedar Rock | Franklin | 2,371 |
| Center | Chatham | 7,464 |
| Center | Stanly | 5,857 |
| Center Grove | Guilford | 7,457 |
| Central | Bladen | 1,259 |
| Cerro Gordo | Columbus | 2,152 |
| Chadbourn | Columbus | 6,219 |
| Chambersburg | Iredell | 11,344 |
| Chapel Hill | Orange | 87,971 |
| Charleston | Swain | 11,982 |
| Cheek Creek | Montgomery | 628 |
| Cheeks | Orange | 9,313 |
| Cheoah | Graham | 6,794 |
| Cherry Lane | Alleghany | 1,528 |
| Cherryville | Gaston | 16,500 |
| Chestnut Hill | Ashe | 828 |
| Chicod | Pitt | 6,645 |
| Chimney Rock | Rutherford | 2,666 |
| China Grove | Rowan | 24,501 |
| Chocowinity | Beaufort | 9,290 |
| Clarksville | Davie | 3,766 |
| Clay | Guilford | 7,359 |
| Clayton | Johnston | 30,712 |
| Clear Creek | Henderson | 6,011 |
| Clemmonsville | Forsyth | 14,927 |
| Cleveland | Johnston | 19,628 |
| Cleveland | Rowan | 2,817 |
| Clifton | Ashe | 1,911 |
| Clines | Catawba | 24,354 |
| Clyde | Haywood | 6,542 |
| Coddle Creek | Iredell | 32,599 |
| Colerain | Bertie | 3,176 |
| Coleridge | Randolph | 2,290 |
| Colfax | Rutherford | 8,681 |
| Colly | Bladen | 2,262 |
| Columbia | Pender | 2,304 |
| Columbia | Randolph | 7,016 |
| Columbia | Tyrrell | 2,929 |
| Columbus | Polk | 6,474 |
| Concord | Iredell | 6,999 |
| Concord | Randolph | 2,613 |
| Conoconnara | Halifax | 499 |
| Conrad Hill | Davidson | 9,401 |
| Contentnea Neck | Lenoir | 3,684 |
| Cool Spring | Rutherford | 14,804 |
| Cool Springs | Iredell | 3,912 |
| Cooper Gap | Polk | 2,206 |
| Coopers | Nash | 3,625 |
| Cotton Grove | Davidson | 9,066 |
| Courthouse | Camden | 3,822 |
| Cove Creek | Watauga | 3,118 |
| Cowee | Macon | 2,273 |
| Crab Creek | Henderson | 4,558 |
| Crabtree | Haywood | 1,736 |
| Crabtree | Yancey | 3,359 |
| Cranberry | Alleghany | 375 |
| Cranberry | Avery | 614 |
| Crawford | Currituck | 7,208 |
| Creston | Ashe | 612 |
| Croatan | Dare | 1,085 |
| Crooked Creek | McDowell | 3,527 |
| Cross Creek | Cumberland | 66,163 |
| Cross Roads | Martin | 1,515 |
| Cross Roads | Wilson | 3,896 |
| Crowders Mountain | Gaston | 15,821 |
| Cullowhee | Jackson | 9,428 |
| Cunningham | Person | 1,770 |
| Currituck | Hyde | 1,129 |
| Cypress Creek | Bladen | 965 |
| Cypress Creek | Duplin | 3,409 |
| Cypress Creek | Franklin | 3,843 |
| Dabney | Vance | 2,818 |
| Dallas | Gaston | 21,436 |
| Danbury | Stokes | 1,238 |
| Dan River | Caswell | 2,567 |
| Davidson | Iredell | 32,786 |
| Davis | Carteret | 426 |
| Deep Creek | Yadkin | 3,326 |
| Deep River | Guilford | 18,518 |
| Dillsboro | Jackson | 1,527 |
| Dismal | Sampson | 4,054 |
| Dobson | Surry | 8,860 |
| Drexel | Burke | 6,594 |
| Dry Wells | Nash | 3,702 |
| Duke | Harnett | 5,976 |
| Duncans Creek | Rutherford | 594 |
| Dunn | Franklin | 8,402 |
| Dunns Rock | Transylvania | 4,877 |
| Durham | Durham | 106,210 |
| Dutchville | Granville | 17,725 |
| Dysartsville | McDowell | 3,450 |
| Eagle Mills | Iredell | 1,912 |
| Eastatoe | Transylvania | 2,989 |
| East Bend | Yadkin | 3,489 |
| East Fork | Haywood | 1,652 |
| East Howellsville | Robeson | 2,459 |
| East Lake | Dare | 161 |
| Eastover | Cumberland | 12,753 |
| Edneyville | Henderson | 4,734 |
| Edwards | Wilkes | 7,318 |
| Egypt | Yancey | 585 |
| Eldora | Surry | 3,715 |
| Eldorado | Montgomery | 1,873 |
| Elevation | Johnston | 6,684 |
| Elizabeth City | Pasquotank | 11,741 |
| Elizabethtown | Bladen | 6,948 |
| Elk | Ashe | 613 |
| Elk | Watauga | 638 |
| Elk | Wilkes | 1,002 |
| Elkin | Surry | 6,288 |
| Elk Park | Avery | 1,227 |
| Ellendale | Alexander | 3,632 |
| Ellijay | Macon | 2,691 |
| Emmons | Davidson | 7,243 |
| Endy | Stanly | 1,944 |
| Enfield | Halifax | 5,842 |
| Eno | Orange | 7,501 |
| Fair Bluff | Columbus | 1,788 |
| Fairfield | Hyde | 1,160 |
| Fairmont | Robeson | 5,518 |
| Fairview | Buncombe | 11,111 |
| Faison | Duplin | 4,489 |
| Falkland | Pitt | 3,682 |
| Falling Creek | Lenoir | 5,979 |
| Fallstown | Iredell | 8,736 |
| Farmington | Davie | 11,313 |
| Farmville | Pitt | 6,703 |
| Faucette | Halifax | 1,738 |
| Federal Point | New Hanover | 25,469 |
| Fentress | Guilford | 10,372 |
| Ferrells | Nash | 2,946 |
| Fines Creek | Haywood | 1,266 |
| Fishing Creek | Granville | 8,169 |
| Fishing Creek | Warren | 1,781 |
| Flat Creek | Buncombe | 6,068 |
| Flat River | Person | 7,137 |
| Flats | Macon | 466 |
| Forbush | Yadkin | 4,032 |
| Fork | Warren | 517 |
| Fork | Wayne | 11,149 |
| Fork Mountain-Little Rock Creek | Mitchell | 774 |
| Fort Bragg Military Reservation | Hoke | 0 |
| Fountain | Pitt | 1,356 |
| Frank | Avery | 296 |
| Franklin | Macon | 14,509 |
| Franklin | Rowan | 12,322 |
| Franklin | Sampson | 2,228 |
| Franklin | Surry | 2,400 |
| Franklinton | Franklin | 8,311 |
| Franklinville | Randolph | 10,080 |
| French Broad | Buncombe | 6,912 |
| Frenches Creek | Bladen | 1,035 |
| Friendship | Guilford | 8,648 |
| Fruitville | Currituck | 1,637 |
| Fulton | Davie | 2,281 |
| Furr | Stanly | 9,915 |
| Gaddys | Robeson | 1,511 |
| Gap Civil | Alleghany | 4,474 |
| Gardners | Wilson | 3,870 |
| Gaston | Northampton | 5,973 |
| Gastonia | Gaston | 85,249 |
| Gatesville | Gates | 1,614 |
| Gilkey | Rutherford | 1,952 |
| Gilmer | Guilford | 74,448 |
| Glade Creek | Alleghany | 1,991 |
| Glenwood | McDowell | 2,814 |
| Glisson | Duplin | 2,718 |
| Globe | Caldwell | 385 |
| Gloucester | Transylvania | 1,326 |
| Golden Valley | Rutherford | 1,013 |
| Gold Hill | Rowan | 11,278 |
| Gold Mine | Franklin | 1,630 |
| Goldsboro | Wayne | 22,380 |
| Goose Creek | Union | 14,773 |
| Goose Nest | Martin | 1,100 |
| Grady | Pender | 2,368 |
| Grant | Randolph | 6,336 |
| Grantham | Wayne | 4,264 |
| Grassy Creek | Ashe | 455 |
| Grassy Creek | Mitchell | 8,267 |
| Grays Creek | Cumberland | 9,319 |
| Great Swamp | Wayne | 2,362 |
| Green Creek | Polk | 3,607 |
| Greene | Guilford | 3,386 |
| Green Hill | Rutherford | 2,878 |
| Green Mountain | Yancey | 600 |
| Green River | Henderson | 4,695 |
| Greens Creek | Jackson | 1,429 |
| Greenville | Pitt | 49,564 |
| Griffins | Martin | 1,262 |
| Griffins | Nash | 2,890 |
| Grifton | Pitt | 4,900 |
| Grimesland | Pitt | 11,746 |
| Grove | Harnett | 10,911 |
| Gulf | Chatham | 3,363 |
| Gulledge | Anson | 2,238 |
| Gum Neck | Tyrrell | 425 |
| Gwaltneys | Alexander | 2,252 |
| Hadley | Chatham | 2,476 |
| Halifax | Halifax | 2,775 |
| Hall | Gates | 1,538 |
| Halls | Sampson | 2,476 |
| Hamburg | Jackson | 1,738 |
| Hamilton | Martin | 1,544 |
| Hampton | Davidson | 1,282 |
| Harkers Island | Carteret | 1,207 |
| Harlowe | Carteret | 1,570 |
| Harnett | New Hanover | 37,561 |
| Harrell | Mitchell | 1,179 |
| Harrellsville | Hertford | 1,357 |
| Harris | Franklin | 8,327 |
| Harris | Stanly | 6,480 |
| Haslett | Gates | 2,560 |
| Hatteras | Dare | 2,921 |
| Haw River | Chatham | 1,373 |
| Hawtree | Warren | 1,457 |
| Hayesville | Clay | 3,868 |
| Hayesville | Franklin | 2,098 |
| Healing Spring | Davidson | 2,642 |
| Heaton | Avery | 443 |
| Hectors Creek | Harnett | 5,112 |
| Helton | Ashe | 718 |
| Henderson | Vance | 21,046 |
| Hendersonville | Henderson | 47,527 |
| Herring | Sampson | 1,876 |
| Hertford | Perquimans | 2,601 |
| Hickory | Catawba | 61,829 |
| Hickory Mountain | Chatham | 2,699 |
| Higgins | McDowell | 2,202 |
| Highlands | Macon | 2,668 |
| High Point | Guilford | 79,032 |
| High Shoals | Rutherford | 8,363 |
| Hightowers | Caswell | 1,773 |
| Hillsborough | Orange | 13,809 |
| Hiawassee | Clay | 1,578 |
| Hogback | Transylvania | 2,215 |
| Hollow | Bladen | 2,318 |
| Holloway | Person | 2,362 |
| Holly | Pender | 2,360 |
| Holly Grove | Gates | 2,141 |
| Holly Springs | Wake | 33,071 |
| Honeycutt | Sampson | 3,124 |
| Hookerton | Greene | 4,345 |
| Hoopers Creek | Henderson | 14,573 |
| Horse Creek | Ashe | 680 |
| Hothouse | Cherokee | 1,591 |
| House Creek | Wake | 57,439 |
| Howards Creek | Lincoln | 8,988 |
| Hudson | Caldwell | 12,628 |
| Hughes | Avery | 490 |
| Hunters Mill | Gates | 1,446 |
| Huntsville | Rockingham | 6,085 |
| Hurricane | Ashe | 302 |
| Icard | Burke | 17,628 |
| Indian Springs | Wayne | 7,790 |
| Indian Woods | Bertie | 471 |
| Ingalls | Avery | 2,930 |
| Ingrams | Johnston | 7,016 |
| Institute | Lenoir | 2,623 |
| Iron Duff | Haywood | 1,078 |
| Ironton | Lincoln | 20,744 |
| Island Creek | Duplin | 10,390 |
| Ivy | Buncombe | 3,569 |
| Ivy Hill | Haywood | 4,866 |
| Jacks Creek | Yancey | 1,686 |
| Jackson | Nash | 3,143 |
| Jackson | Northampton | 980 |
| Jackson | Union | 11,012 |
| Jackson Hill | Davidson | 1,107 |
| Jacksonville | Onslow | 70,537 |
| Jacobs Fork | Catawba | 5,157 |
| Jamestown | Guilford | 12,643 |
| Jamesville | Martin | 2,689 |
| Jason | Greene | 1,868 |
| Jefferson | Ashe | 4,718 |
| Jefferson | Guilford | 10,424 |
| Jerusalem | Davie | 6,062 |
| Jobs Cabin | Wilkes | 567 |
| Johnsonville | Harnett | 10,808 |
| Johns River | Caldwell | 1,387 |
| Jonas Ridge | Burke | 678 |
| Jonathan Creek | Haywood | 3,118 |
| Judkins | Warren | 718 |
| Kenansville | Duplin | 5,565 |
| Kernersville | Forsyth | 30,386 |
| Kings Creek | Caldwell | 1,715 |
| Kinnakeet | Dare | 1,401 |
| Kinston | Lenoir | 21,406 |
| Kirby | Northampton | 3,701 |
| Kittrell | Vance | 5,822 |
| Lake Creek | Bladen | 909 |
| Lake Landing | Hyde | 1,784 |
| Lanesboro | Anson | 6,015 |
| Lanes Creek | Union | 2,650 |
| Laurel | Ashe | 413 |
| Laurel Creek | Watauga | 1,947 |
| Laurel Hill | Scotland | 3,245 |
| Leaksville | Rockingham | 20,857 |
| Leasburg | Caswell | 1,210 |
| Lebanon | Durham | 18,722 |
| Lees | Columbus | 3,835 |
| Lees Mill | Washington | 2,884 |
| Leesville | Wake | 41,850 |
| Leicester | Buncombe | 19,148 |
| Lenoir | Caldwell | 21,005 |
| Level Cross | Randolph | 3,970 |
| Lewis Fork | Wilkes | 1,585 |
| Lewisville | Forsyth | 17,707 |
| Lexington | Davidson | 30,851 |
| Liberty | Randolph | 5,792 |
| Lilesville | Anson | 3,366 |
| Lillington | Harnett | 4,892 |
| Limestone | Buncombe | 14,394 |
| Limestone | Duplin | 7,721 |
| Lincolnton | Lincoln | 20,145 |
| Linville | Avery | 453 |
| Linville | Burke | 1,761 |
| Lisbon | Sampson | 1,964 |
| Litaker | Rowan | 11,867 |
| Little Coharie | Sampson | 6,215 |
| Little River | Alexander | 1,439 |
| Little River | Caldwell | 4,208 |
| Little River | Montgomery | 851 |
| Little River | Orange | 3,458 |
| Little River | Transylvania | 2,545 |
| Little River | Wake | 12,528 |
| Littleton | Halifax | 3,991 |
| Locke | Rowan | 14,149 |
| Lockwoods Folly | Brunswick | 23,248 |
| Locust Hill | Caswell | 2,545 |
| Logan Store | Rutherford | 3,904 |
| Long Acre | Beaufort | 9,185 |
| Long Creek | Pender | 2,241 |
| Long Hill | Surry | 1,602 |
| Louisburg | Franklin | 8,496 |
| Lovelace | Wilkes | 719 |
| Lovelady | Burke | 8,546 |
| Lovelady | Caldwell | 18,000 |
| Lower Creek | Burke | 2,830 |
| Lower Creek | Caldwell | 12,393 |
| Lower Fork | Burke | 3,667 |
| Lower Hominy | Buncombe | 9,491 |
| Lumber Bridge | Robeson | 2,407 |
| Lumberton | Robeson | 24,839 |
| McDaniels | Sampson | 1,317 |
| McLauchlin | Hoke | 21,455 |
| Madison | Guilford | 5,701 |
| Madison | Rockingham | 8,111 |
| Magnolia | Duplin | 3,140 |
| Manchester | Cumberland | 24,643 |
| Maneys Neck | Hertford | 1,344 |
| Mangum | Durham | 6,362 |
| Mannings | Nash | 5,349 |
| Marion | McDowell | 19,949 |
| Marks Creek | Richmond | 13,914 |
| Marks Creek | Wake | 21,932 |
| Marsh | Surry | 2,631 |
| Marshallberg | Carteret | 469 |
| Marshville | Union | 8,523 |
| Masonboro | New Hanover | 14,773 |
| Matthews | Chatham | 13,442 |
| Maxton | Robeson | 5,880 |
| Mayo | Rockingham | 7,377 |
| Meadow | Johnston | 3,366 |
| Meadows | Stokes | 5,336 |
| Meat Camp | Watauga | 3,191 |
| Meredith | Wake | 13,926 |
| Merrimon | Carteret | 605 |
| Merry Hill | Bertie | 992 |
| Micro | Johnston | 2,812 |
| Middleburg | Vance | 3,712 |
| Middle Creek | Wake | 44,136 |
| Middle Fork I | Forsyth | 1,710 |
| Middle Fork II | Forsyth | 2,639 |
| Midway | Davidson | 12,181 |
| Millers | Alexander | 2,221 |
| Millshoal | Macon | 2,802 |
| Mills River | Henderson | 13,470 |
| Milton | Caswell | 2,217 |
| Mineral Springs | Richmond | 3,899 |
| Mingo | Sampson | 2,770 |
| Minneapolis | Avery | 384 |
| Mintonsville | Gates | 1,097 |
| Mitchell | Bertie | 2,628 |
| Mocksville | Davie | 9,837 |
| Monroe | Guilford | 10,487 |
| Monroe | Union | 52,310 |
| Montezuma | Avery | 676 |
| Montford Cove | McDowell | 2,541 |
| Moravian Falls | Wilkes | 3,007 |
| Morehead | Carteret | 25,256 |
| Morehead | Guilford | 195,218 |
| Morgan | Rowan | 3,424 |
| Morgan | Rutherford | 1,592 |
| Morganton | Burke | 28,058 |
| Morven | Anson | 2,065 |
| Moseley Hall | Lenoir | 5,715 |
| Mountain | Jackson | 492 |
| Mountain Creek | Catawba | 9,678 |
| Mount Airy | Surry | 24,334 |
| Mount Gilead | Montgomery | 2,995 |
| Mount Hermon | Pasquotank | 6,927 |
| Mount Tirzah | Person | 3,340 |
| Mount Ulla | Rowan | 1,692 |
| Moyock | Currituck | 6,879 |
| Mulberry | Caldwell | 826 |
| Mulberry | Wilkes | 6,688 |
| Murfreesboro | Hertford | 6,085 |
| Murphy | Cherokee | 10,921 |
| Nags Head | Dare | 10,543 |
| Nahunta | Wayne | 3,608 |
| Nantahala | Macon | 802 |
| Nantahala | Swain | 1,988 |
| Nashville | Nash | 10,238 |
| Nebo | McDowell | 3,652 |
| Neills Creek | Harnett | 7,464 |
| Neuse | Lenoir | 5,129 |
| Neuse | Wake | 73,617 |
| New Bethel | Rockingham | 6,703 |
| New Castle | Wilkes | 1,740 |
| New Hope | Chatham | 2,700 |
| New Hope | Iredell | 1,662 |
| New Hope | Perquimans | 3,005 |
| New Hope | Randolph | 1,198 |
| New Hope | Wayne | 15,559 |
| Newland | Pasquotank | 2,791 |
| Newland No. 1 | Avery | 1,189 |
| Newland No. 2 | Avery | 1,096 |
| New Light | Wake | 7,591 |
| New Market | Randolph | 6,620 |
| Newport | Carteret | 9,974 |
| New River | Watauga | 11,838 |
| New Salem | Union | 3,532 |
| Newton | Catawba | 32,264 |
| Newton Grove | Sampson | 2,130 |
| Nixonton | Pasquotank | 9,170 |
| North Albemarle | Stanly | 14,046 |
| North Brook | Lincoln | 5,840 |
| North Buck Shoals | Yadkin | 2,348 |
| North Catawba | Caldwell | 6,939 |
| North Clinton | Sampson | 11,242 |
| North Cove | McDowell | 2,263 |
| North Fall Creek | Yadkin | 1,515 |
| North Fork | Ashe | 868 |
| North Fork | Watauga | 229 |
| North Knobs | Yadkin | 4,649 |
| North Liberty | Yadkin | 6,013 |
| Northwest | Brunswick | 12,190 |
| North Whitakers | Nash | 2,471 |
| North Wilkesboro | Wilkes | 7,319 |
| Notla | Cherokee | 4,570 |
| Nutbush | Warren | 2,538 |
| Oak Grove | Durham | 39,856 |
| Oak Hill | Granville | 1,776 |
| Oakland | Chatham | 1,250 |
| Oak Level | Nash | 6,995 |
| Oak Ridge | Guilford | 11,402 |
| Obids | Ashe | 1,376 |
| Oconeechee | Northampton | 2,153 |
| Ocracoke | Hyde | 948 |
| Old Fields | Ashe | 2,708 |
| Old Fields | Wilson | 5,379 |
| Old Fort | McDowell | 4,122 |
| Old Richmond | Forsyth | 5,236 |
| Olds | Greene | 3,990 |
| Old Town | Forsyth | 149 |
| Olin | Iredell | 1,840 |
| Olive Hill | Person | 2,417 |
| O'Neals | Johnston | 8,868 |
| Ophir | Montgomery | 641 |
| Ormonds | Greene | 1,980 |
| Orrum | Robeson | 2,001 |
| Oxford | Granville | 7,425 |
| Pactolus | Pitt | 8,154 |
| Palmyra | Halifax | 1,083 |
| Pantego | Beaufort | 6,685 |
| Panther Branch | Wake | 24,019 |
| Parkton | Robeson | 4,170 |
| Parkville | Perquimans | 2,697 |
| Patterson | Caldwell | 2,283 |
| Peak Creek | Ashe | 1,104 |
| Pearces Mill | Cumberland | 17,771 |
| Pee Dee | Montgomery | 1,434 |
| Pelham | Caswell | 3,602 |
| Pembroke | Robeson | 13,732 |
| Pensacola | Yancey | 625 |
| Peters Creek | Stokes | 2,026 |
| Philadelphus | Robeson | 3,593 |
| Pigeon | Haywood | 5,546 |
| Pikeville | Wayne | 3,138 |
| Pilot | Surry | 4,020 |
| Pine Level | Johnston | 4,852 |
| Pineola | Avery | 1,207 |
| Pine Swamp | Ashe | 2,614 |
| Piney Creek | Alleghany | 858 |
| Piney Creek | Ashe | 1,138 |
| Piney Grove | Sampson | 2,774 |
| Pink Hill | Lenoir | 3,039 |
| Plain View | Sampson | 5,095 |
| Pleasant Grove | Johnston | 14,677 |
| Pleasant Grove | Randolph | 571 |
| Pleasant Hill | Northampton | 604 |
| Plumtree | Avery | 711 |
| Plymouth | Washington | 7,334 |
| Pond Mountain | Ashe | 240 |
| Poplar | Mitchell | 239 |
| Poplar Branch | Currituck | 7,823 |
| Poplar Point | Martin | 511 |
| Portsmouth | Carteret | 0 |
| Prathers Creek | Alleghany | 869 |
| Price | Rockingham | 1,645 |
| Price Creek | Yancey | 1,364 |
| Providence | Pasquotank | 8,351 |
| Providence | Randolph | 6,786 |
| Providence | Rowan | 9,985 |
| Pyatte | Avery | 516 |
| Quaker Gap | Stokes | 2,818 |
| Quaker Meadows | Burke | 7,339 |
| Qualla | Jackson | 6,161 |
| Quewhiffle | Hoke | 4,049 |
| Raeford | Hoke | 12,995 |
| Raft Swamp | Robeson | 3,860 |
| Raleigh | Wake | 117,838 |
| Ramseytown | Yancey | 443 |
| Randleman | Randolph | 9,536 |
| Ransom | Columbus | 4,809 |
| Reddies River | Wilkes | 10,870 |
| Red Hill | Mitchell | 361 |
| Red Oak | Nash | 3,581 |
| Red Springs | Robeson | 6,175 |
| Reedy Creek | Davidson | 5,088 |
| Reems Creek | Buncombe | 12,263 |
| Reidsville | Rockingham | 19,874 |
| Rennert | Robeson | 3,408 |
| Reynoldson | Gates | 1,801 |
| Richland | Beaufort | 3,112 |
| Richland | Randolph | 3,811 |
| Richlands | Onslow | 20,615 |
| Rich Square | Northampton | 3,214 |
| Ridenhour | Stanly | 3,029 |
| River | Jackson | 1,359 |
| River | Warren | 1,352 |
| Riverbend | Gaston | 26,596 |
| Roanoke | Northampton | 2,143 |
| Roanoke | Warren | 1,214 |
| Roanoke Rapids | Halifax | 23,144 |
| Roaring Creek | Avery | 468 |
| Robersonville | Martin | 3,451 |
| Rock Creek | Guilford | 11,635 |
| Rock Creek | Wilkes | 6,046 |
| Rockfish | Cumberland | 55,819 |
| Rockfish | Duplin | 1,892 |
| Rockford | Surry | 1,846 |
| Rockingham | Richmond | 15,745 |
| Rocky Mount | Nash | 16,257 |
| Rocky Point | Pender | 7,266 |
| Rocky Springs | Montgomery | 2,369 |
| Rose Hill | Duplin | 3,411 |
| Roseneath | Halifax | 572 |
| Rowland | Robeson | 2,351 |
| Roxboro | Person | 15,284 |
| Roxobel | Bertie | 1,671 |
| Ruffin | Rockingham | 5,726 |
| Rutherfordton | Rutherford | 13,107 |
| Saddletree | Robeson | 4,891 |
| St. Johns | Hertford | 2,822 |
| St. Marys | Wake | 58,484 |
| St. Matthews | Wake | 65,731 |
| St. Pauls | Robeson | 9,030 |
| Salem | Granville | 1,884 |
| Salem | Pasquotank | 1,681 |
| Salem Chapel | Forsyth | 6,808 |
| Salisbury | Rowan | 28,205 |
| Saluda | Polk | 1,972 |
| Sand Hill | Lenoir | 1,256 |
| Sandy Creek | Franklin | 2,718 |
| Sandy Creek | Vance | 6,711 |
| Sandy Creek | Warren | 1,866 |
| Sandy Mush | Buncombe | 1,407 |
| Sandy Ridge | Union | 45,672 |
| Saratoga | Wilson | 1,665 |
| Sassafras Fork | Granville | 2,831 |
| Saulston | Wayne | 7,676 |
| Sauratown | Stokes | 5,681 |
| Savannah | Jackson | 1,495 |
| Scotch Irish | Rowan | 1,820 |
| Scotland Neck | Halifax | 3,684 |
| Scott Creek | Jackson | 2,094 |
| Scuppernong | Tyrrell | 673 |
| Scuppernong | Washington | 1,724 |
| Seaboard | Northampton | 1,494 |
| Sea Level | Carteret | 522 |
| Selma | Johnston | 9,860 |
| Seventy-First | Cumberland | 93,772 |
| Shady Grove | Davie | 5,308 |
| Shallotte | Brunswick | 26,545 |
| Shannon | Robeson | 1,381 |
| Sharpes | Alexander | 5,154 |
| Sharpesburg | Iredell | 2,622 |
| Shawneehaw | Watauga | 765 |
| Shiloh | Camden | 2,506 |
| Shiloh | Iredell | 8,705 |
| Shine | Greene | 1,780 |
| Shoal Creek | Cherokee | 2,290 |
| Shoals | Surry | 2,032 |
| Shocco | Warren | 1,358 |
| Shooting Creek | Clay | 1,513 |
| Siloam | Surry | 1,148 |
| Silver Creek | Burke | 10,793 |
| Silver Hill | Davidson | 6,164 |
| Simpsonville | Rockingham | 3,976 |
| Sixpound | Warren | 1,061 |
| Skinnersville | Washington | 1,286 |
| Smith | Duplin | 2,517 |
| Smithbridge | Macon | 3,858 |
| Smith Creek | Warren | 2,334 |
| Smithfield | Johnston | 16,409 |
| Smiths | Robeson | 6,030 |
| Smithville | Brunswick | 14,467 |
| Smoky Creek | Burke | 772 |
| Smyrna | Carteret | 787 |
| Smyrna | Robeson | 2,048 |
| Snakebite | Bertie | 1,410 |
| Snow Creek | Mitchell | 1,779 |
| Snow Creek | Stokes | 2,738 |
| Snow Hill | Greene | 2,901 |
| Somers | Wilkes | 1,077 |
| South Albemarle | Stanly | 8,225 |
| South Buck Shoals | Yadkin | 1,368 |
| South Clinton | Sampson | 6,877 |
| South Fall Creek | Yadkin | 2,551 |
| South Fork | Forsyth | 2,576 |
| South Fork | Tyrrell | 50 |
| South Knobs | Yadkin | 1,804 |
| South Liberty | Yadkin | 3,132 |
| South Mills | Camden | 3,652 |
| South Point | Gaston | 40,484 |
| South River | Sampson | 1,748 |
| South Toe | Yancey | 2,344 |
| Southwest | Lenoir | 1,503 |
| South Westfield | Surry | 2,233 |
| South Whitakers | Nash | 3,197 |
| South Williams | Columbus | 7,023 |
| Speights Bridge | Greene | 2,085 |
| Spring Hill | Scotland | 5,045 |
| Springhill | Wilson | 3,131 |
| Stacy | Carteret | 214 |
| Stanton | Wilkes | 541 |
| Stantonsburg | Wilson | 1,968 |
| Star | Montgomery | 3,147 |
| Statesville | Iredell | 26,460 |
| Stecoah | Graham | 1,425 |
| Steele | Rowan | 1,725 |
| Steeles | Richmond | 467 |
| Sterlings | Robeson | 959 |
| Stewarts Creek | Harnett | 3,767 |
| Stewarts Creek | Surry | 7,169 |
| Stewartsville | Scotland | 20,184 |
| Stonewall | Hoke | 1,918 |
| Stoney Creek | Wayne | 15,659 |
| Stoney Creek | Caswell | 3,866 |
| Stony Creek | Nash | 25,019 |
| Stony Fork | Watauga | 2,585 |
| Straits | Carteret | 2,826 |
| Stump Sound | Onslow | 17,336 |
| Sugarfork | Macon | 523 |
| Sugar Loaf | Alexander | 1,326 |
| Sulphur Springs | Rutherford | 5,133 |
| Sumner | Guilford | 8,971 |
| Swannanoa | Buncombe | 15,551 |
| Swan Quarter | Hyde | 782 |
| Swansboro | Onslow | 19,417 |
| Sweetwater | Clay | 850 |
| Swift Creek | Pitt | 1,669 |
| Swift Creek | Wake | 50,225 |
| Sylva | Jackson | 6,671 |
| Tabernacle | Randolph | 6,541 |
| Tally Ho | Granville | 5,553 |
| Tatums | Columbus | 3,771 |
| Taylors | Wilson | 9,001 |
| Taylors Bridge | Sampson | 1,388 |
| Taylorsville | Alexander | 11,099 |
| Thomasville | Davidson | 39,010 |
| Thompson | Robeson | 1,236 |
| Toisnot | Wilson | 5,462 |
| Topsail | Pender | 21,253 |
| Town Creek | Brunswick | 27,533 |
| Township 1 | Craven | 8,656 |
| Township 1 | Pamlico | 2,697 |
| Township 1, Carthage | Moore | 6,820 |
| Township 1, Charlotte | Mecklenburg | 731,424 |
| Township 1, Edenton | Chowan | 7,731 |
| Township 1, Greenwood | Lee | 8,885 |
| Township 1, Harrisburg | Cabarrus | 24,424 |
| Township 1, North Marshall | Madison | 2,990 |
| Township 1, Patterson | Alamance | 4,869 |
| Township 1, South Marshall | Madison | 1,194 |
| Township 1, Tarboro | Edgecombe | 15,189 |
| Township 1, White Oak | Jones | 2,038 |
| Township 2 | Craven | 8,695 |
| Township 2 | Pamlico | 2,909 |
| Township 2, Bensalem | Moore | 3,319 |
| Township 2, Berryhill | Mecklenburg | 3,812 |
| Township 2, Coble | Alamance | 4,491 |
| Township 2, Jonesboro | Lee | 12,859 |
| Township 2, Laurel | Madison | 1,100 |
| Township 2, Lower Conetoe | Edgecombe | 1,906 |
| Township 2, Middle | Chowan | 3,644 |
| Township 2, Pollocksville | Jones | 2,612 |
| Township 2, Poplar Tent | Cabarrus | 35,668 |
| Township 3 | Craven | 3,462 |
| Township 3 | Pamlico | 2,546 |
| Township 3, Boone Station | Alamance | 25,227 |
| Township 3, Cape Fear | Lee | 3,949 |
| Township 3, Mars Hill | Madison | 4,492 |
| Township 3, Odell | Cabarrus | 12,348 |
| Township 3, Sheffield | Moore | 5,770 |
| Township 3, Steele Creek | Mecklenburg | 8,831 |
| Township 3, Trenton | Jones | 1,981 |
| Township 3, Upper | Chowan | 1,333 |
| Township 3, Upper Conetoe | Edgecombe | 736 |
| Township 4 | Pamlico | 2,268 |
| Township 4, Beech Glenn | Madison | 3,327 |
| Township 4, Cypress Creek | Jones | 907 |
| Township 4, Deep Creek | Edgecombe | 911 |
| Township 4, Deep River | Lee | 2,161 |
| Township 4, Kannapolis | Cabarrus | 42,072 |
| Township 4, Morton | Alamance | 5,414 |
| Township 4, Ritter | Moore | 2,753 |
| Township 4, Yeopim | Chowan | 2,085 |
| Township 5 | Craven | 3,836 |
| Township 5 | Pamlico | 2,724 |
| Township 5, Deep River | Moore | 409 |
| Township 5, East Sanford | Lee | 6,747 |
| Township 5, Faucette | Alamance | 3,339 |
| Township 5, Lower Fishing Creek | Edgecombe | 1,282 |
| Township 5, New Gilead | Cabarrus | 4,067 |
| Township 5, Providence | Mecklenburg | 10,575 |
| Township 5, Tuckahoe | Jones | 900 |
| Township 5, Walnut | Madison | 1,790 |
| Township 6 | Craven | 25,398 |
| Township 6, Chinquapin | Jones | 641 |
| Township 6, Clear Creek | Mecklenburg | 21,423 |
| Township 6, Graham | Alamance | 24,183 |
| Township 6, Greenwood | Moore | 3,877 |
| Township 6, Hot Springs | Madison | 1,254 |
| Township 6, Rimertown | Cabarrus | 2,636 |
| Township 6, Upper Fishing Creek | Edgecombe | 1,560 |
| Township 6, West Sanford | Lee | 18,236 |
| Township 7 | Craven | 14,197 |
| Township 7, Albright | Alamance | 4,383 |
| Township 7, Beaver Creek | Jones | 1,074 |
| Township 7, Crab Orchard | Mecklenburg | 4,869 |
| Township 7, Ebbs Chapel | Madison | 1,264 |
| Township 7, Gold Hill | Cabarrus | 1,431 |
| Township 7, McNeill | Moore | 18,592 |
| Township 7, Pocket | Lee | 5,029 |
| Township 7, Swift Creek | Edgecombe | 3,525 |
| Township 8 | Craven | 35,865 |
| Township 8, Mallard Creek | Mecklenburg | 4,088 |
| Township 8, Mount Pleasant | Cabarrus | 5,607 |
| Township 8, Newlin | Alamance | 6,349 |
| Township 8, Sandhills | Moore | 17,032 |
| Township 8, Sparta | Edgecombe | 2,554 |
| Township 8, Spring Creek | Madison | 914 |
| Township 9 | Craven | 3,396 |
| Township 9, Deweese | Mecklenburg | 21,932 |
| Township 9, Georgeville | Cabarrus | 3,458 |
| Township 9, Mineral Springs | Moore | 25,915 |
| Township 9, Otter Creek | Edgecombe | 1,807 |
| Township 9, Sandy Mush | Madison | 551 |
| Township 9, Thompson | Alamance | 8,532 |
| Township 10, Grapevine | Madison | 1,498 |
| Township 10, Lemley | Mecklenburg | 24,801 |
| Township 10, Little River | Moore | 3,760 |
| Township 10, Lower Town Creek | Edgecombe | 3,303 |
| Township 10, Melville | Alamance | 16,681 |
| Township 10, Midland | Cabarrus | 6,241 |
| Township 11, Central Cabarrus | Cabarrus | 21,937 |
| Township 11, Long Creek | Mecklenburg | 11,204 |
| Township 11, Pleasant Grove | Alamance | 4,575 |
| Township 11, Revere-Rice Cove | Madison | 390 |
| Township 11, Walnut Creek | Edgecombe | 1,931 |
| Township 12, Burlington | Alamance | 37,537 |
| Township 12, Concord | Cabarrus | 18,122 |
| Township 12, Paw Creek | Mecklenburg | 6,563 |
| Township 12, Rocky Mount | Edgecombe | 17,896 |
| Township 13, Cokey | Edgecombe | 2,134 |
| Township 13, Haw River | Alamance | 5,551 |
| Township 13, Morning Star | Mecklenburg | 33,650 |
| Township 14, Pineville | Mecklenburg | 7,479 |
| Township 14, Upper Town Creek | Edgecombe | 1,818 |
| Township 15, Huntersville | Mecklenburg | 28,977 |
| Townsville | Vance | 1,341 |
| Traphill | Wilkes | 3,391 |
| Trent | Lenoir | 3,527 |
| Triangle | Durham | 93,373 |
| Trinity | Randolph | 26,604 |
| Troy | Montgomery | 6,270 |
| Tryon | Polk | 3,747 |
| Turkey | Sampson | 2,181 |
| Turnbull | Bladen | 733 |
| Turnersburg | Iredell | 3,880 |
| Tusquittee | Clay | 764 |
| Tyro | Davidson | 9,025 |
| Tyson | Stanly | 2,638 |
| Union | Pender | 4,232 |
| Union | Randolph | 2,940 |
| Union | Robeson | 3,053 |
| Union | Rutherford | 1,824 |
| Union | Wilkes | 1,259 |
| Union Grove | Iredell | 2,170 |
| Unity | Rowan | 2,215 |
| Upper Creek | Burke | 1,180 |
| Upper Fork | Burke | 1,066 |
| Upper Hominy | Buncombe | 16,789 |
| Upper Little River | Harnett | 8,829 |
| Uwharrie | Montgomery | 1,825 |
| Valleytown | Cherokee | 7,275 |
| Vance | Lenoir | 3,545 |
| Vance | Union | 52,497 |
| Vienna | Forsyth | 10,243 |
| Waccamaw | Brunswick | 3,448 |
| Waccamaw | Columbus | 2,175 |
| Wadesboro | Anson | 9,118 |
| Wake Forest | Wake | 65,491 |
| Walnut Grove | Granville | 2,373 |
| Walnut Grove | Wilkes | 1,223 |
| Walnut Hill | Ashe | 1,369 |
| Warrenton | Warren | 4,776 |
| Warsaw | Duplin | 6,108 |
| Washington | Beaufort | 14,838 |
| Washington | Guilford | 2,937 |
| Watauga | Watauga | 3,558 |
| Watkins | Vance | 640 |
| Waynesville | Haywood | 19,489 |
| Webster | Jackson | 2,686 |
| Welches Creek | Columbus | 1,783 |
| Weldon | Halifax | 5,636 |
| Wentworth | Rockingham | 8,825 |
| Westbrook | Sampson | 1,812 |
| Western Prong | Columbus | 811 |
| Westfield | Surry | 2,648 |
| West Howellsville | Robeson | 2,868 |
| West Jefferson | Ashe | 4,614 |
| Whitehead | Alleghany | 1,060 |
| Whitehouse | Robeson | 1,053 |
| White Oak | Bladen | 1,896 |
| White Oak | Carteret | 12,942 |
| White Oak | Haywood | 401 |
| White Oak | Onslow | 20,751 |
| White Oak | Polk | 2,504 |
| White Oak | Wake | 72,894 |
| Whites | Bertie | 1,554 |
| Whites Creek | Bladen | 1,546 |
| White Store | Anson | 506 |
| Whiteville | Columbus | 11,593 |
| Wiccacanee | Northampton | 1,837 |
| Wilders | Johnston | 18,083 |
| Wilkesboro | Wilkes | 10,448 |
| Williams | Chatham | 13,624 |
| Williams | Columbus | 4,578 |
| Williams | Martin | 1,256 |
| Williamsboro | Vance | 3,332 |
| Williamsburg | Rockingham | 4,464 |
| Williamson | Scotland | 7,683 |
| Williamston | Martin | 9,112 |
| Wilmington | New Hanover | 106,476 |
| Wilson | Wilson | 42,775 |
| Wilson Creek | Caldwell | 55 |
| Wilson Mills | Johnston | 5,555 |
| Windsor | Bertie | 7,971 |
| Winston | Forsyth | 229,617 |
| Winterville | Pitt | 46,280 |
| Winton | Hertford | 4,441 |
| Wisharts | Robeson | 6,303 |
| Wittenburg | Alexander | 10,075 |
| Wolf Pit | Richmond | 8,425 |
| Wolfscrape | Duplin | 3,267 |
| Woodington | Lenoir | 2,089 |
| Woodsdale | Person | 1,502 |
| Woodville | Bertie | 1,409 |
| Yadkin | Stokes | 21,834 |
| Yadkin College | Davidson | 710 |
| Yadkin Valley | Caldwell | 1,205 |
| Yanceyville | Caswell | 3,767 |
| Yellow Creek | Graham | 642 |
| Youngsville | Franklin | 14,423 |

== See also ==
- North Carolina
- List of cities and towns in North Carolina
- List of counties in North Carolina

== Works cited ==
- Davis, Anita Price; Rhyne, Mike; Withrow, Scott (2011). Colfax Township. Arcadia Publishing. ISBN 9780738586915.
- Farbman, Daniel (June 2022). "Redemption Localism". North Carolina Law Review. 100 (5): 1527–1556.
- Lawrence, David M. (2014). "Chapter 1 : An Overview of Local Government" (PDF). County and Municipal Government (second ed.). Chapel Hill: University of North Carolina School of Government. pp. 2–13. ISBN 978-1-56011-775-9.
