= St. Marys Township =

St. Marys Township or Saint Marys Township may refer to the following townships in the United States:

- St. Marys Township, Adams County, Indiana
- St. Marys Township, Kansas
- St. Mary's Township, Wake County, North Carolina
- St. Mary Township, Hancock County, Illinois
- Saint Marys Township, Auglaize County, Ohio
- Saint Mary's Township, Perry County, Missouri

== See also ==
- St. Mary Township, Waseca County, Minnesota
