= Caswell Township, Pender County, North Carolina =

Township in Pender County, North Carolina

Caswell Township
- Township
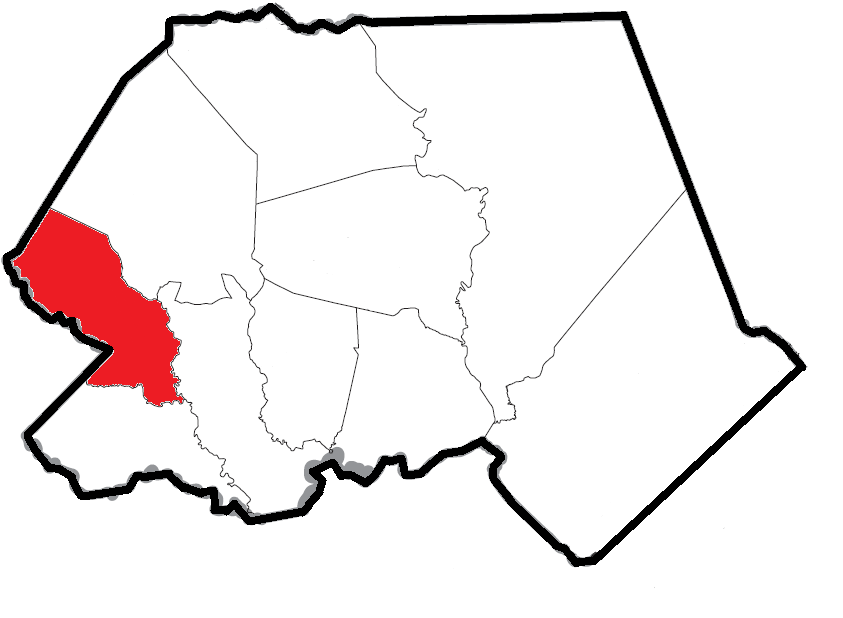
- Location of Caswell Township within Pender County

- Location of Pender County within North Carolina
- Country: United States
- State: North Carolina
- County: Pender

Area
  - Total: 48.9 sq mi (127 km^{2})

Population (2020)
  - Total: 1,419
- Time zone: UTC-5 (EST)
  - Summer (DST): UTC-4 (EDT)
- Area codes: 910, 472

Caswell Township is a township in Pender County, North Carolina, United States.

== Geography and population ==
Caswell Township is one of 10 townships within Pender County. It is 48.9 square miles (127 km^{2}) in total area. The township is located in western Pender County.

In 2020, the population of Columbia Township was 1,959.

In 2022, the estimated population of the township was 2,212.

Communities within Caswell Township include most of Atkinson and the unincorporated community of Point Caswell. Additionally, a portion of Moores Creek National Battlefield is within the township.

The township is bordered to the northwest by Sampson County, to the northeast by Columbia Township, to the east by Grady Township, to the south by Canetuck Township, and to the west by Bladen County.

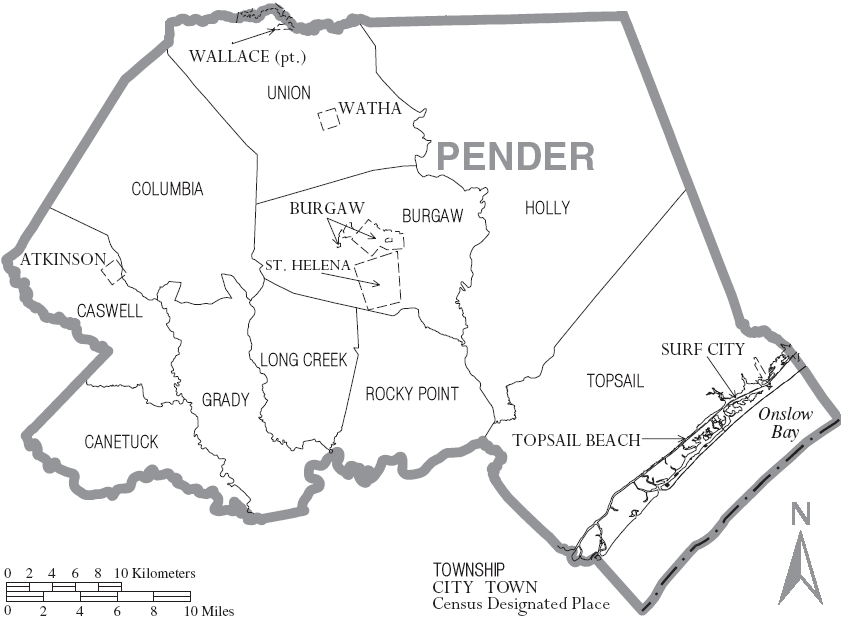
Map of Pender County with municipal and township labels
