= Wilmington Township =

Wilmington Township may refer to:

- Wilmington Township, Union County, Arkansas, in Union County, Arkansas
- Wilmington Township, Will County, Illinois
- Wilmington Township, DeKalb County, Indiana
- Wilmington Township, Wabaunsee County, Kansas, in Wabaunsee County, Kansas
- Wilmington Township, Houston County, Minnesota
- Wilmington Township, New Hanover County, North Carolina
- Wilmington Township, Lawrence County, Pennsylvania
- Wilmington Township, Mercer County, Pennsylvania

== See also ==
- Wilmington (disambiguation)
