= Columbia Township, Pender County, North Carolina =

Township in Pender County, North Carolina

Columbia Township
- Township
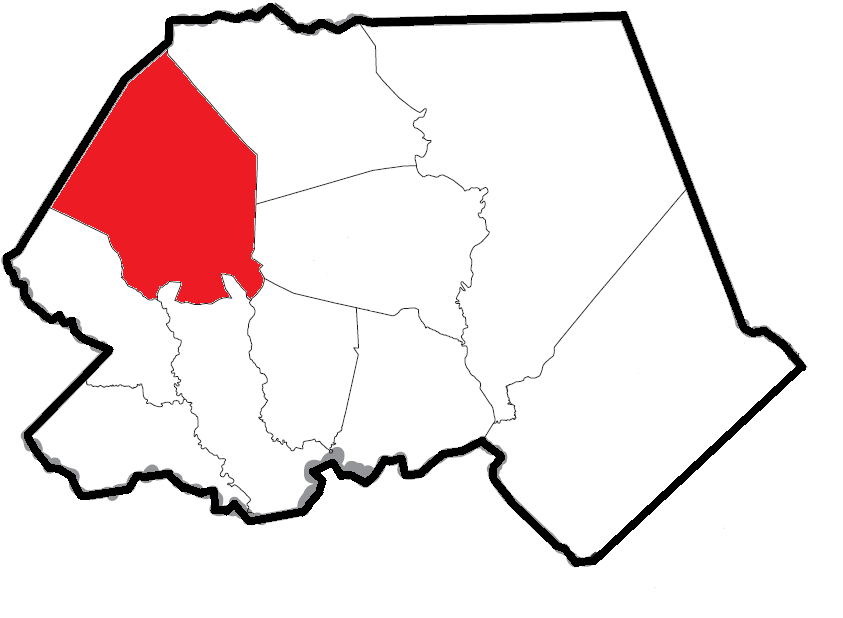
- Location of Columbia Township within Pender County

- Location of Pender County within North Carolina
- Country: United States
- State: North Carolina
- County: Pender

Area
  - Total: 98.5 sq mi (255 km^{2})

Population (2020)
  - Total: 1,959
- Time zone: UTC-5 (EST)
  - Summer (DST): UTC-4 (EDT)
- Area codes: 910, 472

Columbia Township is a township in Pender County, North Carolina, United States.

== Geography and population ==
Columbia Township is one of 10 townships within Pender County. It is 98.5 square miles (255 km^{2}) in total area. The township is located in northwestern Pender County.

In 2020, the population of Columbia Township was 1,959.

In 2022, the estimated population of the township was 1,987.

Communities within Columbia Township include Shiloh and a small portion of Atkinson. The primary highways in the township are US 421 and NC 53.

The township is bordered to the northwest by Sampson County, to the northeast by Union Township, to the east by Burgaw Township, to the southeast by Long Creek Township, to the south by Grady Township, and to the southwest by Caswell Township.

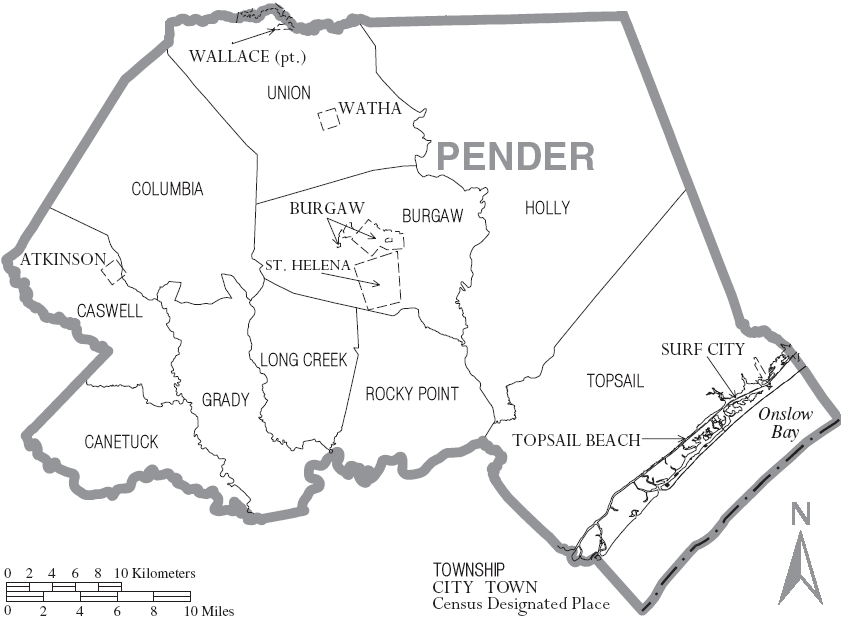
Map of Pender County with municipal and township labels
