= Swansboro Township, Onslow County, North Carolina =

Township in Onslow County, North Carolina, U.S.

Coordinates: 34°41′N 77°10′W

Swansboro Township
- Township
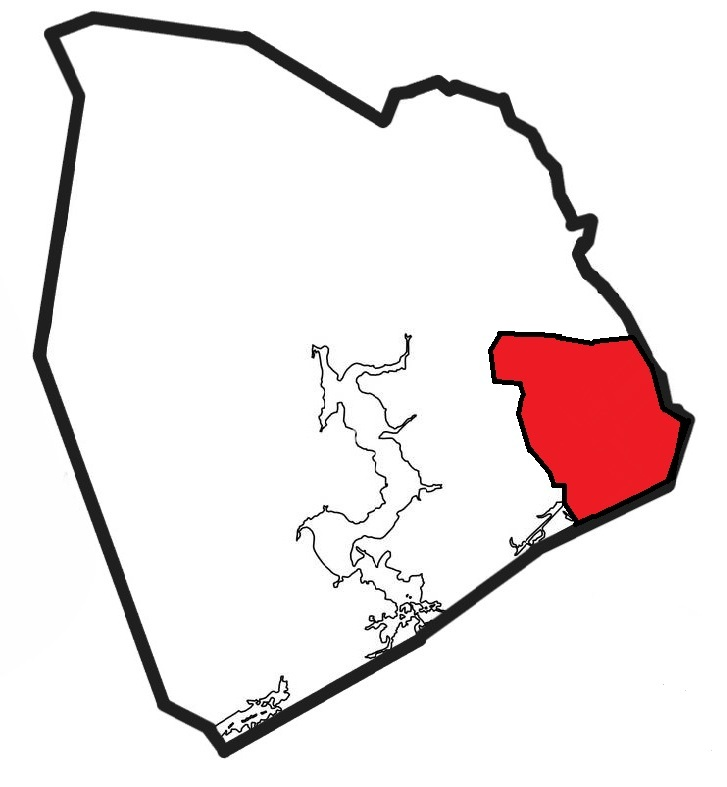
- Location of Swansboro Township within Onslow County

- Location of Onslow County within North Carolina
- Country: United States
- State: North Carolina
- County: Onslow

Area
  - Land: 41.7 sq mi (108 km^{2})

Population (2020)
  - Total: 21,415
- Time zone: UTC-5 (EST)
  - Summer (DST): UTC-4 (EDT)
- ZIP Code(s): 28539, 28584
- Area codes: 252, 910, 472

Swansboro Township is a township in Onslow County, North Carolina, United States.

== Geography ==
Swansboro Township is one of seven townships within Onslow County. It is 41.7 square miles (108 km^{2}) by land area. The township is located in southeastern Onslow County.

Communities within Swansboro Township include Hubert and Swansboro. NC 24 and NC 172 are the primary highways within the township.

Swansboro Township is bordered to the north by White Oak Township, to the east by Carteret County, to the south by the Atlantic Ocean, and to the west by Camp Lejeune Township.

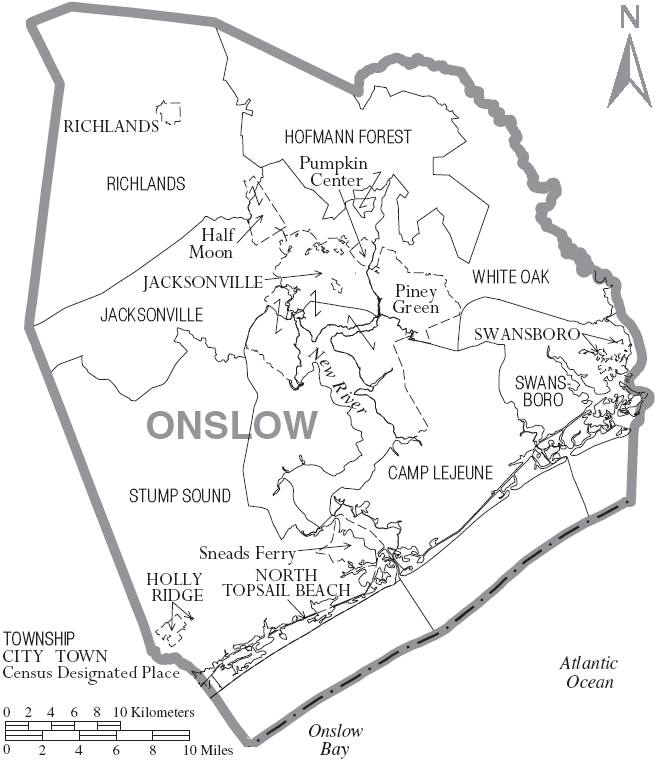
Map of Onslow County with municipal and township labels

== Population ==
In 2020, the population of Swansboro Township was 21,415.

== Demographics ==
=== 2020 census ===
At the 2020 census, there were 9,256 households and 10,169 housing units within Swansboro Township.

The median household income for the township was $67,669.

Twenty-six percent of the township's population had a bachelor's degree or higher.
