= Lake Landing Township, Hyde County, North Carolina =

Lake Landing Township
- Township
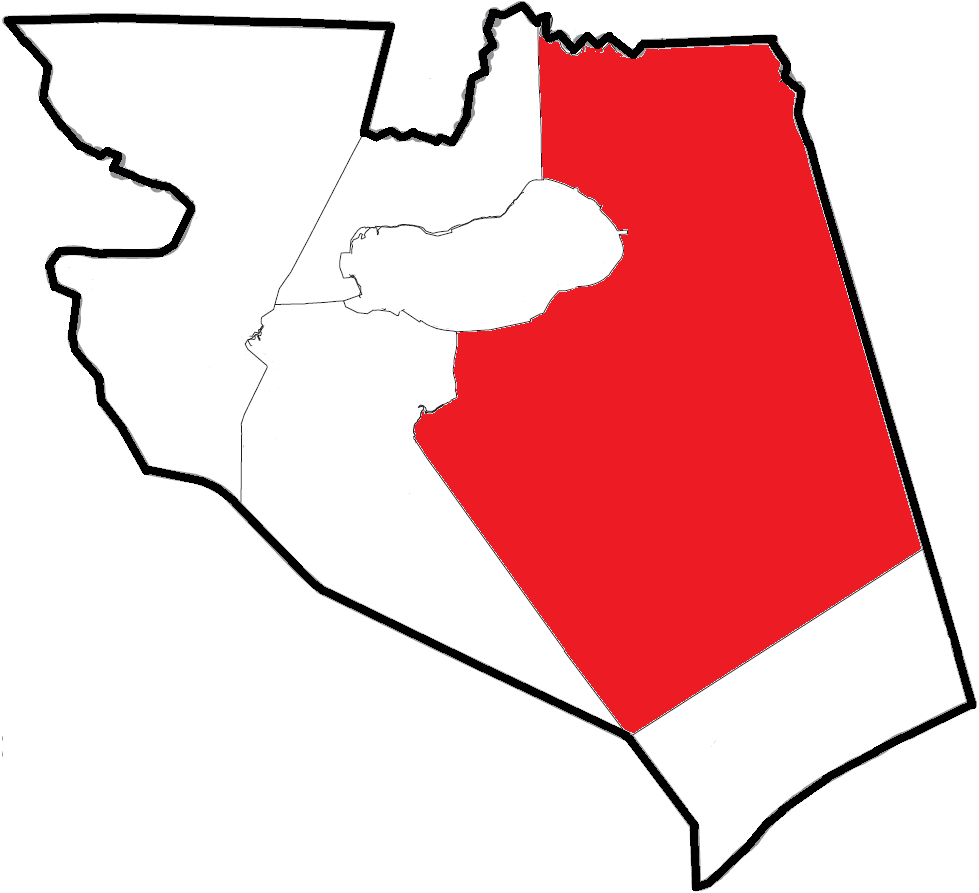
- Location of Lake Landing Township within Hyde County

- Location of Hyde County within North Carolina
- Country: United States
- State: North Carolina
- County: Hyde

Area
  - Total: 213.8 sq mi (554 km^{2})

Population (2020)
  - Total: 1,341
- Time zone: UTC-5 (EST)
  - Summer (DST): UTC-4 (EDT)
- Area code: 252

Lake Landing Township is a township in Hyde County, North Carolina, United States.

== Geography and population ==
Lake Landing Township is one of six townships within Hyde County. It is 213.8 square miles (554 km^{2}) in total area. The township is located in eastern Hyde County.

In 2020, the population of Lake Landing Township was 1,341.

In 2022, the estimated population of the township was 1,515.

Communities within Lake Landing Township include Engelhard, Lake Landing, Middletown, and Nebraska.

The township is bordered to the northwest by Fairfield Township and Lake Mattamuskeet Township, to the north by Tyrrell County and Dare County, to the east by Pamlico Sound, to the south by Ocracoke Township, and to the west by Swan Quarter Township.

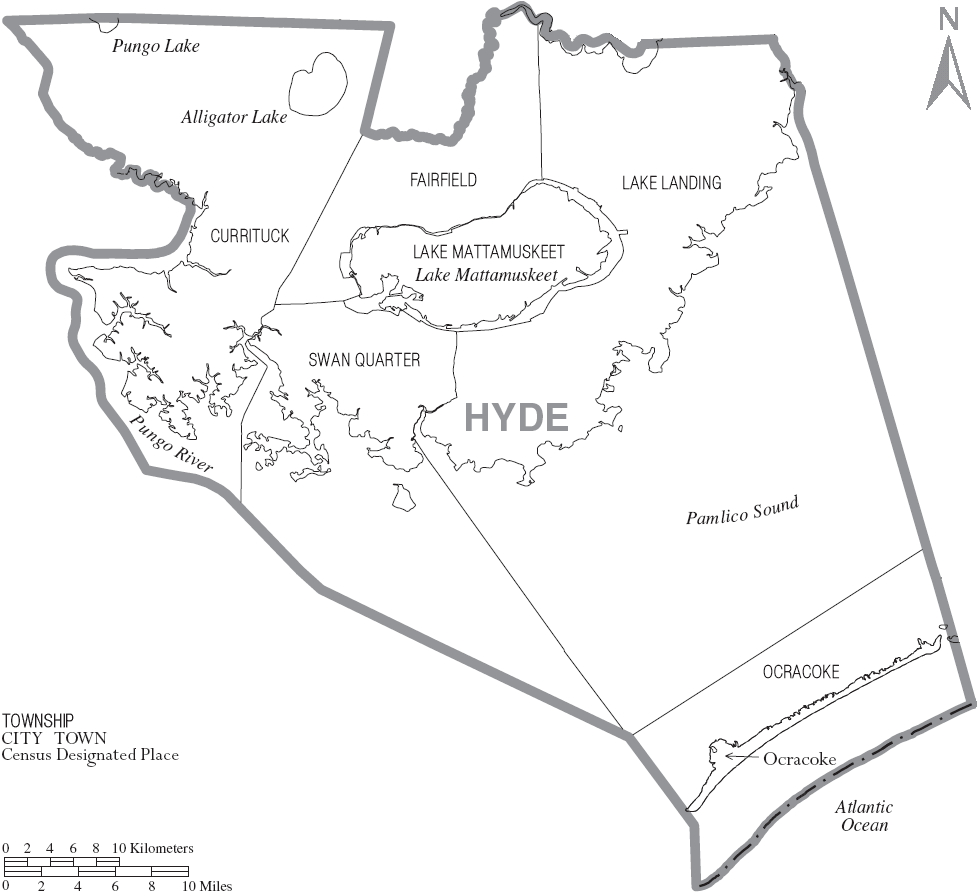
Map of Hyde County with municipal and township labels
