= Topsail Township, Pender County, North Carolina =

Township in Pender County, North Carolina

Topsail Township
- Township
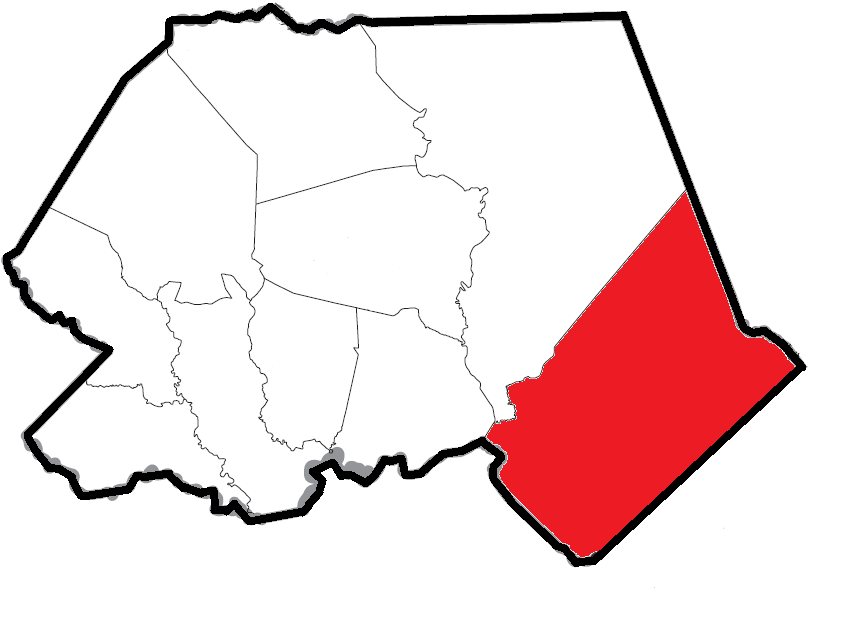
- Location of Topsail Township within Pender County

- Location of Pender County within North Carolina
- Country: United States
- State: North Carolina
- County: Pender

Area
  - Total: 157.8 sq mi (409 km^{2})

Population (2020)
  - Total: 30,544
- Time zone: UTC-5 (EST)
  - Summer (DST): UTC-4 (EDT)
- Area codes: 910, 472

Topsail Township is a township in Pender County, North Carolina, United States.

== Geography and population ==
Topsail Township is one of 10 townships within Pender County. It is 157.8 square miles (409 km^{2}) in total area. The township is located in southeastern Pender County.

In 2020, the population of Topsail Township was 30,544.

Communities within Topsail Township include Hampstead, Sloop Point, Surf City, and Topsail Beach. US 17 and NC 50 are the primary highways within the township.

Topsail Township is bordered to the northwest by Holly Township, to the northeast by Onslow County, to the southeast by the Atlantic Ocean, to the southwest by New Hanover County, and to the west by Rocky Point Township.

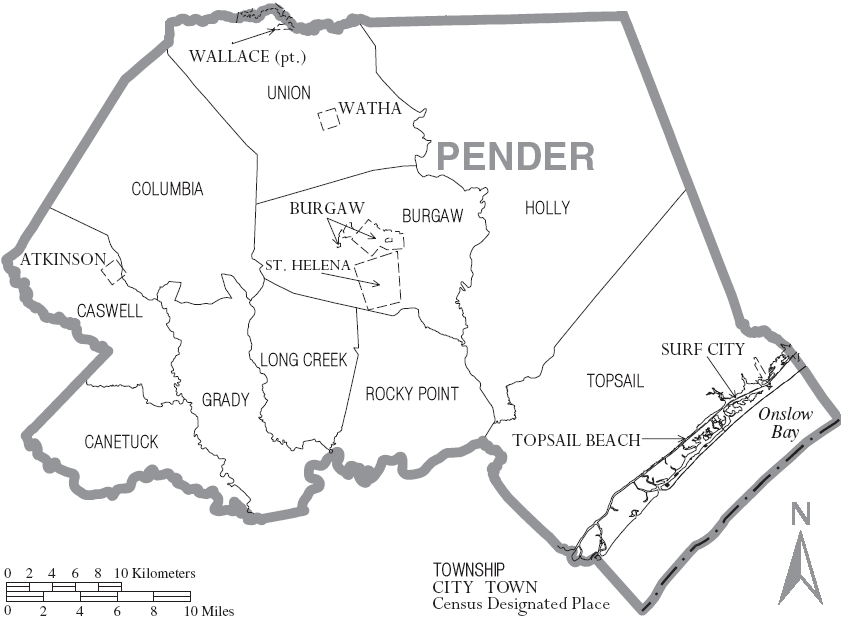
Map of Pender County with municipal and township labels
