= Ocracoke Township, Hyde County, North Carolina =

Township in Hyde County, North Carolina

Ocracoke Township
- Township
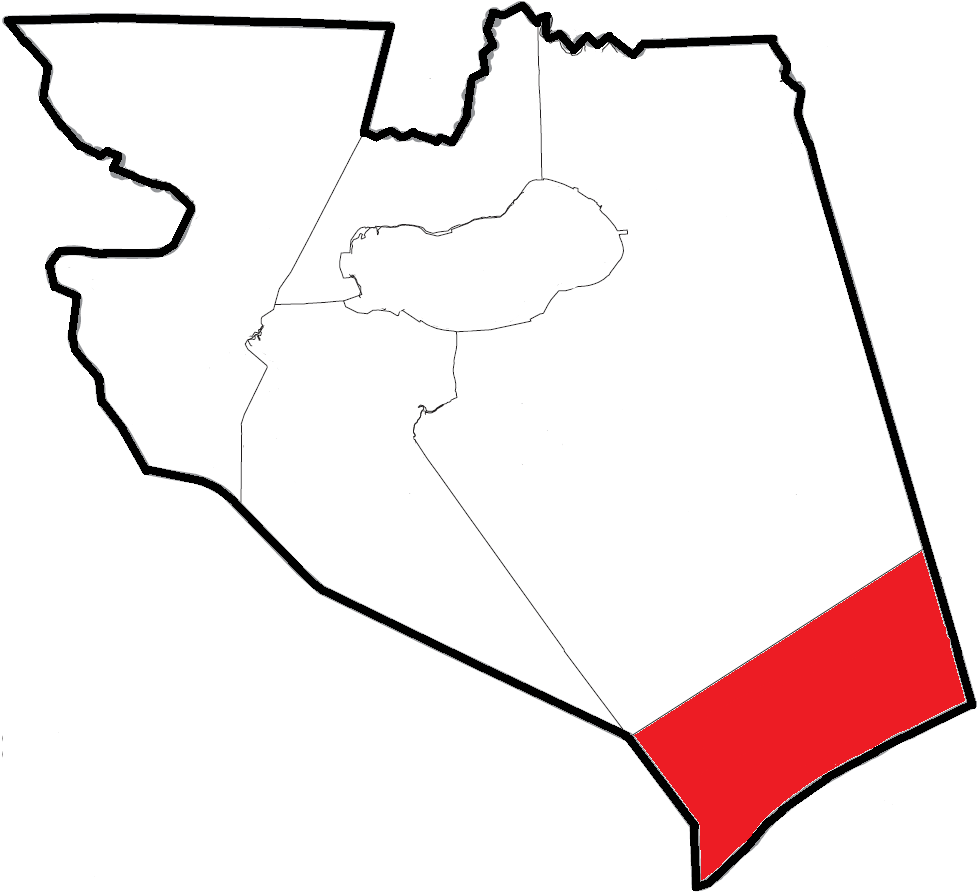
- Location of Ocracoke Township within Hyde County

- Location of Hyde County within North Carolina
- Country: United States
- State: North Carolina
- County: Hyde

Area
  - Total: 8.7 sq mi (23 km^{2})

Population (2020)
  - Total: 797
- Time zone: UTC-5 (EST)
  - Summer (DST): UTC-4 (EDT)
- Area code: 252

Ocracoke Township is a township in Hyde County, North Carolina, United States.

== Geography and population ==
Ocracoke Township is one of six townships within Hyde County. It is 8.2 square miles (21 km^{2}) in total area. The township is located in southeastern Hyde County.

In 2020, the population of Ocracoke Township was 797.

In 2022, the estimated population of the township was 715.

Communities within Ocracoke Township include Ocracoke and the entirety of Ocracoke Island.

The township is bordered to the northwest by Lake Landing Township, to the northeast by Dare County, to the southeast by the Atlantic Ocean, and to the southwest by Carteret County.

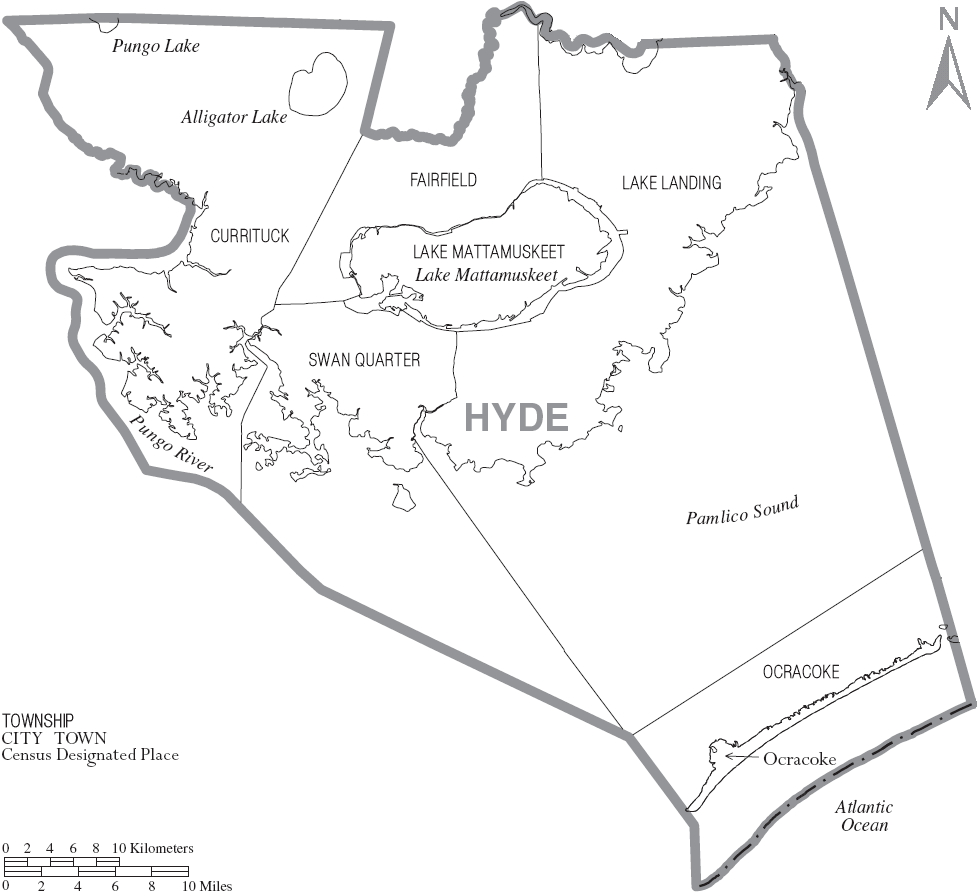
Map of Hyde County with municipal and township labels
