= Sharpesburg Township, Iredell County, North Carolina =

Coordinates: 35°55′36″N 80°57′51″W

Sharpesburg Township
- Township
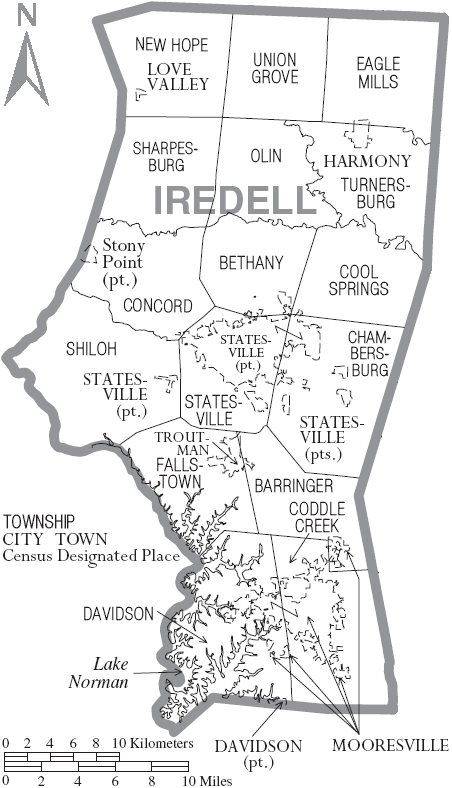
- Sharpesburg Township in Iredell County
- Country: United States
- State: North Carolina
- County: Iredell
- Established: 1868

Government
  - Type: non-functioning administrative subdivision

Area
  - Total: 34.75 sq mi (90.0 km^{2})
  - Land: 34.55 sq mi (89.5 km^{2})
  - Water: 0.2 sq mi (0.52 km^{2})

Population (2018)
  - Total: 2,825
  - Density: 82/sq mi (32/km^{2})
- zip: 28678, 28636, 28625, 28660

Sharpesburg Township is a non-functioning administrative division of Iredell County, North Carolina, United States. By the requirements of the North Carolina Constitution of 1868, the counties were divided into townships, which included Sharpesburg township as one of sixteen townships in Iredell county.

== Geography ==
Sharpesburg Township is located in the northeastern section of Iredell County. It is bordered by New Hope Township to the north, Concord Township and the Yadkin River to the south, Olin Township to the east, and Alexander County to the west. The following streams flow through Sharpesburg Township: Snow Creek, Buck Branch, Little Rocky Creek, Patterson Creek, Tuckers Creek, and the Yadkin River.

== History ==
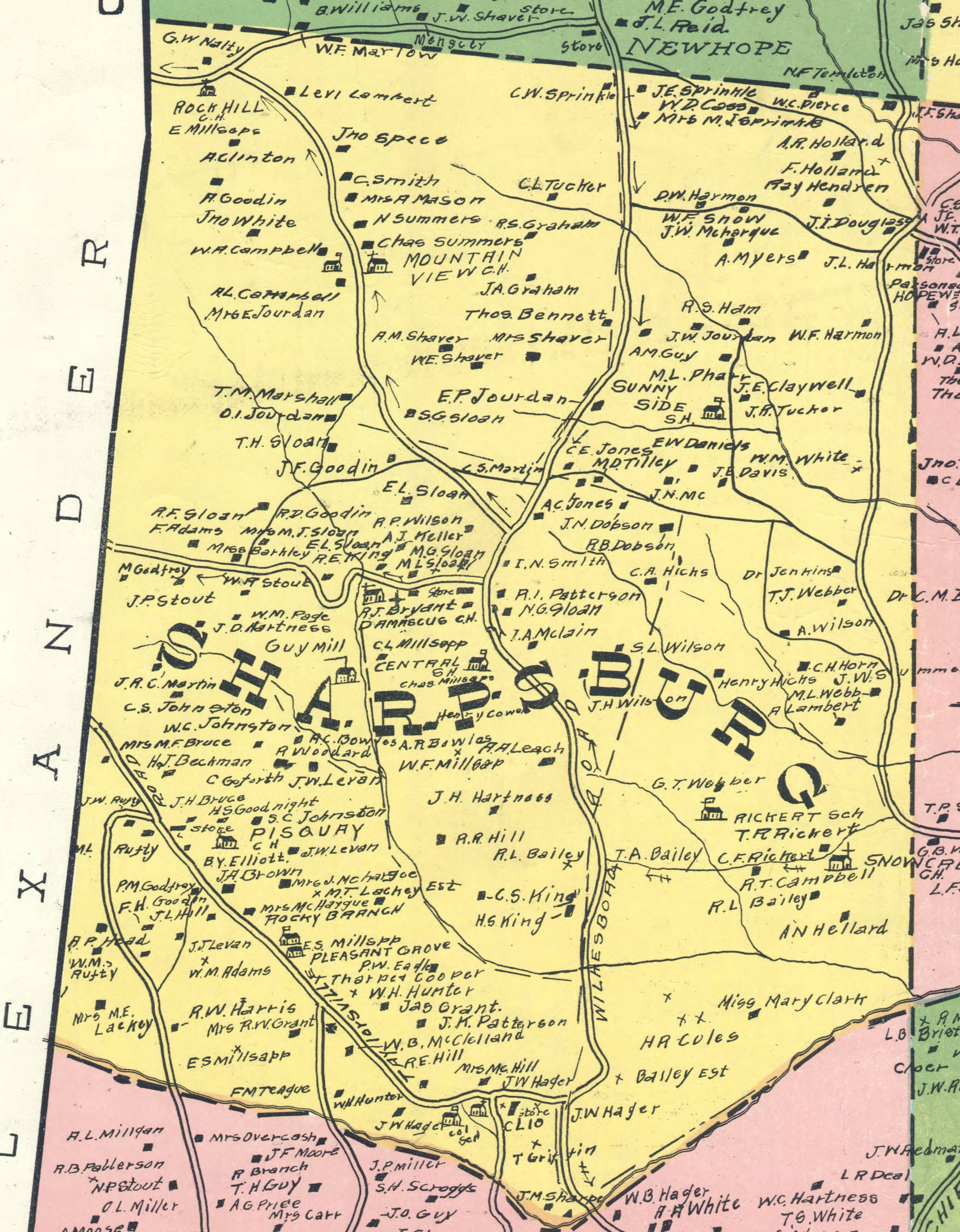
1917 Map of Sharpesburg Township

Sharpesburg Township was named for William Sharpe (1742–1818), who lived in the area. Historic sites within Sharpesburg Township include the Damascus Baptist Church, built in 1855 and the Snow Creek Methodist Church and Burying Ground, built in 1884–1885.

Another notable resident of Sharpesburg Township was William Franklin Wasson (1858–1874), who was the Sheriff of Iredell County when Tom Dula was arrested and tried. Wasson was buried at the Snow Creek Methodist Church Burying Ground.

According to a 1917 map of Sharpesburg Township, the township included the following:

- Damascus Church, pre-Civil War
- Mountain View Church
- Pisguay Church, pre-Civil War
- Pleasant Grove Church
- Rock Hill Church
- Snow Creek United Methodist Church, pre-Civil War
- Central School House
- Colored School House
- Rickert School House
- Rocky Branch School House
- Sunny Side School House
- Guy Mill
- Clio Store

Historical population
| Census | Pop. | Note | %± |
|---|---|---|---|
| 1870 | 947 | | — |
| 1880 | 1,134 | | 19.7% |
| 1900 | 1,286 | | — |
| 1910 | 1,262 | | −1.9% |
| 1920 | 1,381 | | 9.4% |
| 1930 | 1,427 | | 3.3% |
| 1940 | 1,476 | | 3.4% |
| 2010 | 2,622 | | — |
