= Harrells, North Carolina =

- Town
- Location within the state of North Carolina
- Coordinates: 34°43′40″N 78°12′05″W
- Country: United States
- State: North Carolina
- Counties: Duplin, Sampson

Area
  - Total: 3.15 sq mi (8.15 km^{2})
  - Land: 3.15 sq mi (8.15 km^{2})
  - Water: 0 sq mi (0.00 km^{2})
- Elevation: 85 ft (26 m)

Population (2020)
  - Total: 160
  - Density: 50.9/sq mi (19.64/km^{2})
- Time zone: UTC-5 (Eastern (EST))
  - Summer (DST): UTC-4 (EDT)
- ZIP code: 28444
- Area codes: 910, 472
- FIPS code: 37-29680
- GNIS feature ID: 2406647

Harrells is a town in Duplin and Sampson counties, North Carolina, United States. The population was 160 at the 2020 census. At the previous census in 2010, the population was 202.

== History ==
The Lewis Highsmith Farm and Dr. John B. Seavey House and Cemetery are listed on the National Register of Historic Places. In 1969, a private Christian school, Harrells Christian Academy was founded in the town.

== Geography ==
Harrells is located in southeastern Sampson County. The northeastern portion of the town falls within southwestern Duplin County.

U.S. Route 421 passes through the town, leading north 22 miles (35 km) to Clinton, the Sampson County seat, and south 40 miles (64 km) to Wilmington. North Carolina Highway 41 leads east 14 miles (23 km) to Wallace and west 26 miles (42 km) to Elizabethtown.

According to the United States Census Bureau, the town has a total area of 3.2 square miles (8.2 km^{2}), all land.

Most of Harrells is within the Franklin Township of Sampson County. The northeastern portion of Harrells falls within the Rockfish Township of Duplin County.

== Demographics ==
Historical population
Census	Pop.	Note	%±
1880	68		—
1950	147		—
1960	259		76.2%
1970	249		−3.9%
1980	255		2.4%
1990	187		−26.7%
2000	187		0.0%
2010	202		8.0%
2020	160		−20.8%
U.S. Decennial Census

As of the census of 2000, there were 187 people, 80 households, and 58 families residing in the town. The population density was 59.3 inhabitants per square mile (22.9/km^{2}). There were 86 housing units at an average density of 27.3 units per square mile (10.5 units/km^{2}). The racial makeup of the town was 55.08% White, 40.11% African American, 1.07% Native American, 3.74% from other races. Hispanic or Latino of any race were 5.35% of the population.

There were 80 households, out of which 21.3% had children under the age of 18 living with them, 51.3% were married couples living together, 17.5% had a female householder with no husband present, and 27.5% were non-families. 26.3% of all households were made up of individuals, and 11.3% had someone living alone who was 65 years of age or older. The average household size was 2.34 and the average family size was 2.78.

In the town, the population was spread out, with 17.1% under the age of 18, 7.0% from 18 to 24, 27.3% from 25 to 44, 26.2% from 45 to 64, and 22.5% who were 65 years of age or older. The median age was 44 years. For every 100 females, there were 94.8 males. For every 100 females age 18 and over, there were 101.3 males.

The median income for a household in the town was $29,375, and the median income for a family was $41,250. Males had a median income of $30,625 versus $23,750 for females. The per capita income for the town was $34,534. About 14.3% of families and 14.2% of the population were below the poverty line, including 17.9% of those under the age of eighteen and 10.3% of those 65 or over.
