= Damascus Baptist Church Arbor =

Historic church in North Carolina, United States

- U.S. National Register of Historic Places
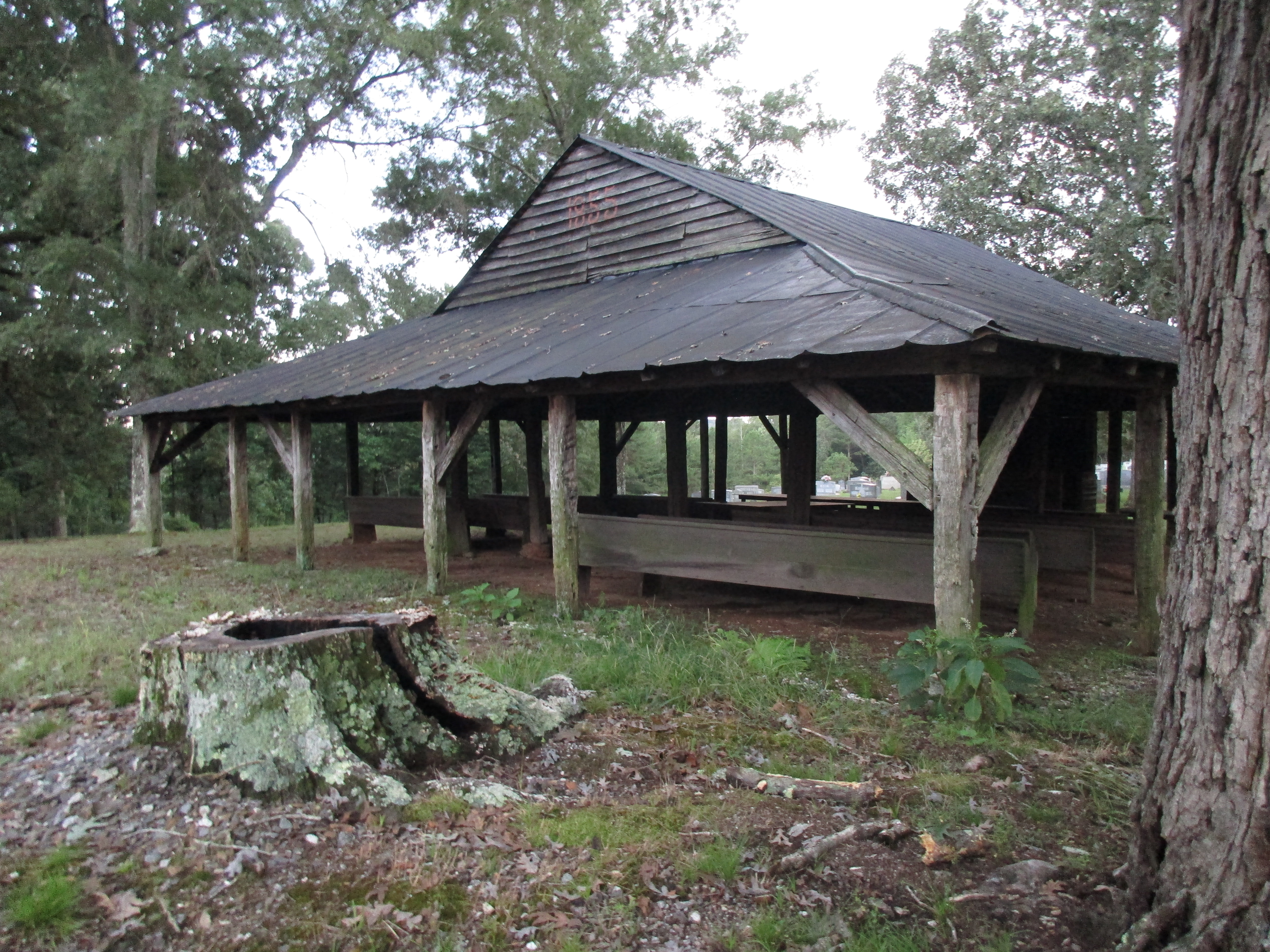

- Location within North Carolina Location within the United States
- Location: Off SR 1158 and SR 1582, near Love Valley, North Carolina
- Coordinates: 35°56′4″N 80°58′43″W
- Area: 4 acres (1.6 ha)
- Built: 1855
- MPS: Iredell County MRA
- NRHP reference No.: 80002850
- Added to NRHP: November 24, 1980

Damascus Baptist Church Arbor is a historic Baptist church arbor located in Sharpesburg Township south of Love Valley, North Carolina, United States. It was constructed in 1855, and is an open rectangular structure measuring 35 feet by 55 feet. The Damascus Baptist Church Arbor continues to be used for brush arbor revivals. It has a gable-on-hip roof and hand hewn, pegged frame, log rafters. The arbor is part of a Damascus Baptist Church complex that includes a church (built between 1907 and 1909), education building, and cemetery.

It was added to the National Register of Historic Places in 1980.

== Location and history ==
The Damascus Baptist Church Arbor, church, and cemetery are located in rural northwest Iredell County, North Carolina. Snow Creek and the town of Love Valley, North Carolina are nearby. The church was built between 1907 and 1909 and is east of the arbor. The cemetery is located southwest of the arbor on an open hillside. The cemetery contains about 200 markers, mostly fieldstones but some inscribed markers dating from at least 1857.

The Damascus Baptist Church's roots go back to May 11, 1839, when a meeting of Baptists was held at the Damascus Meeting House across the Snow Creek from the current location of the church. The first minister of the church, William Garner, was called to service in February 1842. In November 1842, the church appointed managers to construct the arbor. While the congregation has constructed several church buildings, the arbor has remained in continuous use.

Permanent, open-sided wood arbors were an outgrowth of brush arbors. They were used as places of worship before permanent churches could be built and as sites for camp meetings or revival meetings. Arbors were common in the Piedmont region of the United States. These meetings were traditionally held in the summer and the open-sided arbor was a more comfortable location than the interior of a church.
