= Scuppernong Township, Tyrrell County, North Carolina =

Scuppernong Township
- Township
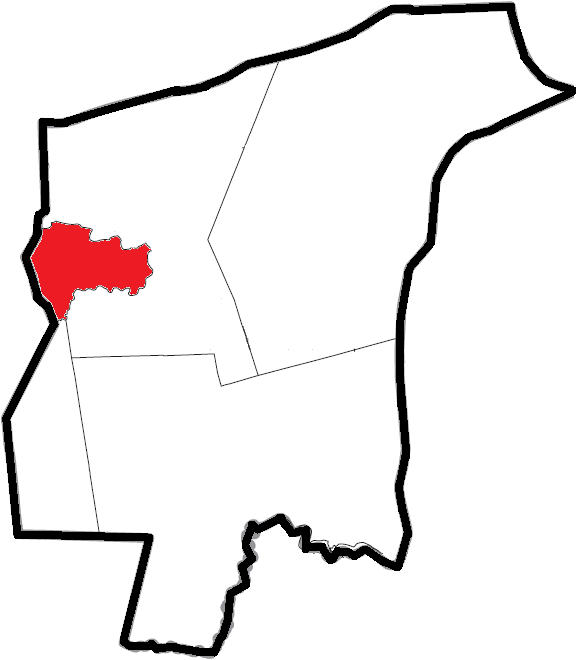
- Location of Scuppernong Township within Tyrrell County

- Location of Tyrrell County within North Carolina
- Country: United States
- State: North Carolina
- County: Tyrrell

Area
  - Total: 21.1 sq mi (55 km^{2})

Population (2020)
  - Total: 576
- Time zone: UTC-5 (EST)
  - Summer (DST): UTC-4 (EDT)
- Area code: 252

Scuppernong Township is a township in Tyrrell County, North Carolina, United States.

== Geography and population ==
Scuppernong Township is one of five townships within Tyrrell County. It is 21.1 square miles (55 km^{2}) in total area. The township is located in western Tyrrell County.

In 2020, the population of Scuppernong Township was 576.

In 2022, the estimated population of the township was 741.

Communities within Scuppernong Township include Travis Creek and Woodley. The primary highway in the township is US 64.

Scuppernong Township is bordered to the north by Albemarle Sound, to the east by Columbia Township, to the south by South Fork Township, and to the west by Washington County.

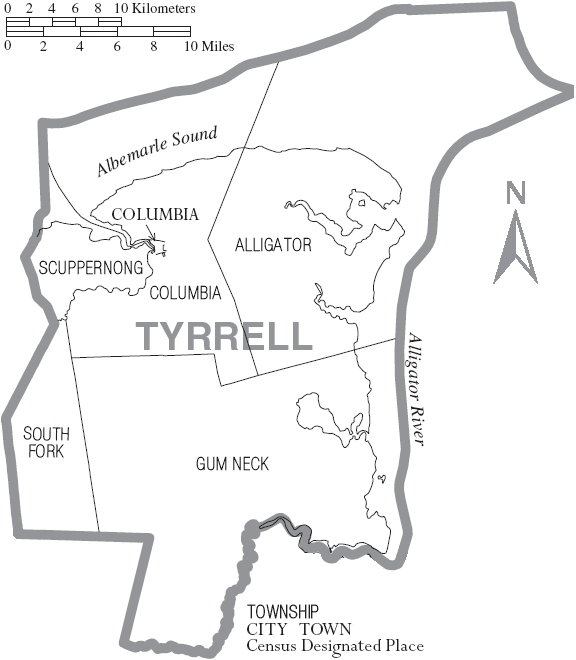
Map of Tyrrell County with municipal and township labels
