= Lewis Highsmith Farm =

Historic farm in North Carolina, United States

- U.S. National Register of Historic Places
- Location within North Carolina Location within the United States
- Location: US 421 S of NC 41, near Harrells, North Carolina
- Coordinates: 34°42′43″N 78°11′17″W
- Area: 113 acres (46 ha)
- Built: c. 1840
- Architectural style: Federal
- MPS: Sampson County MRA
- NRHP reference No.: 86000559
- Added to NRHP: March 17, 1986

Lewis Highsmith Farm, also known as Sweet Liberty, is a historic home and farm complex located near Harrells, Sampson County, North Carolina. The house was built about 1840, and is a large two-story, double pile, Federal style frame dwelling with a gable roof. The front facade features a full-width, two-tier front porch. The interior follows a hall-and-parlor plan. Also on the property are the contributing log smokehouse, the former kitchen, the gable roofed barn, and a nearby cluster of four tobacco barns.

It was added to the National Register of Historic Places in 1986.
