= Taylors Bridge Township, Sampson County, North Carolina =

Township in Sampson County, North Carolina

Taylors Bridge Township
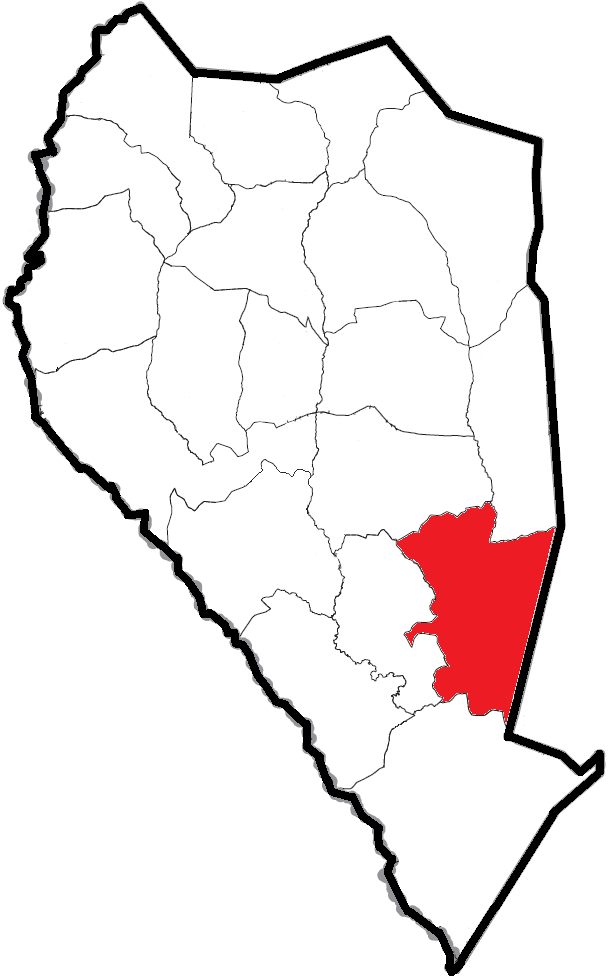
- Location of Taylors Bridge Township within Sampson County

- Location of Sampson County within North Carolina
- Country: United States
- State: North Carolina
- County: Sampson

Area
  - Total: 61.0 sq mi (158 km^{2})

Population (2020)
  - Total: 1,181
- Time zone: UTC-5 (EST)
  - Summer (DST): UTC-4 (EDT)
- Area codes: 910, 472

Taylors Bridge Township is a township in Sampson County, North Carolina, United States.

== Geography and population ==
Taylors Bridge Township is one of 19 townships in Sampson County. It is 61.0 square miles (158 km^{2}) in total area. The township is located in southern Sampson County.

In 2020, the population of Taylors Bridge Township was 1,181.

Communities within Taylors Bridge Township include Delway and Taylors Bridge. US 421 and NC 903 are the primary highways within the township.

Taylors Bridge Township is bordered to the north by South Clinton Township and Turkey Township, to the east by Duplin County, to the south by Franklin Township, and to the west by Lisbon Township.

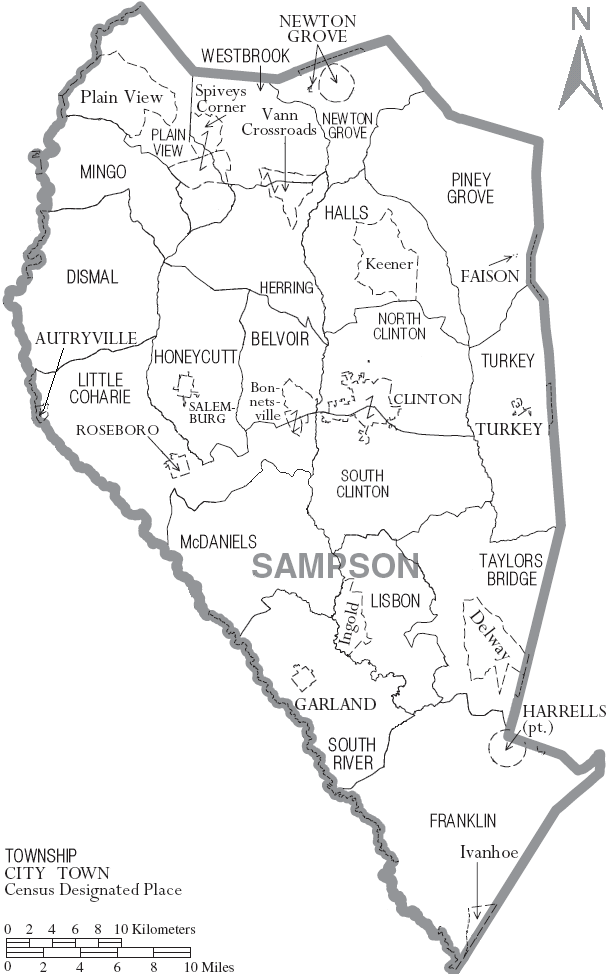
Map of Sampson County with municipal and township labels
