= Seventy-First Township, Cumberland County, North Carolina =

Civil township in North Carolina, U.S.

Coordinates: 35°05′37″N 79°02′21″W

Seventy-First Township is a civil township in Cumberland County, North Carolina. The township was named from the Scottish immigrants who were descendants of the 71st Regiment of the British Army. The 71st Regiment of Foot was first formed in 1758 from the 2nd Battalion, 32nd Regiment of Foot. Soon after formation the 71st Foot was part of a raid on the French coast at Cherbourg during the Seven Years' War. After taking the fort and destroying the docks the regiment reboarded and returned to England before it took part in a similar raid on Belleisle in 1761. In 1763 the 71st became a Regiment of Invalids before disbanding in 1768. The regiment was raised again at Inverness, Stirling and Glasgow by Lieutenant-General Simon Fraser of Lovat as the 71st Regiment of Foot in 1775. It was intended for service in the American Revolutionary War and was well received in Glasgow: "Their conduct was so laudable and exemplary as to gain the affections of the inhabitants, between whom and the soldiers the greatest cordiality prevailed." The regiment embarked for North America in April 1776, fought in New York at the Battle of Long Island, Brandywine in 1777, Savannah in 1778. The regiment was also present at the Siege of Charleston in March 1780, the Battle of Camden in August 1780 and the Battle of Cowpens in January 1781. It next fought at the Battle of Guilford Court House in March 1781 where one officer of the 71st Regiment claimed that "one half of the Highlanders dropped on that spot." The regiment's last action was at the Siege of Yorktown in September 1781.

Scottish Highlanders had previously fought a war of rebellion against the Hanoverian Government in the 1700s but were defeated at the Battle of the Culloden Moor in 1746. After their lands were confiscated; their clan chiefs executed and kilts and bagpipes outlawed, many of the Highland Scots emigrated to North America and settled in the Sandhills of North Carolina. Ironically, the vast majority of these immigrants fought as Loyalists against the revolutionaries.

The population was 93,772 at the 2010 census.
