= Pilot Township, Surry County, North Carolina =

Township in Surry County, North Carolina, U.S.

Coordinates: 36.3799701°N 80.4771472°W

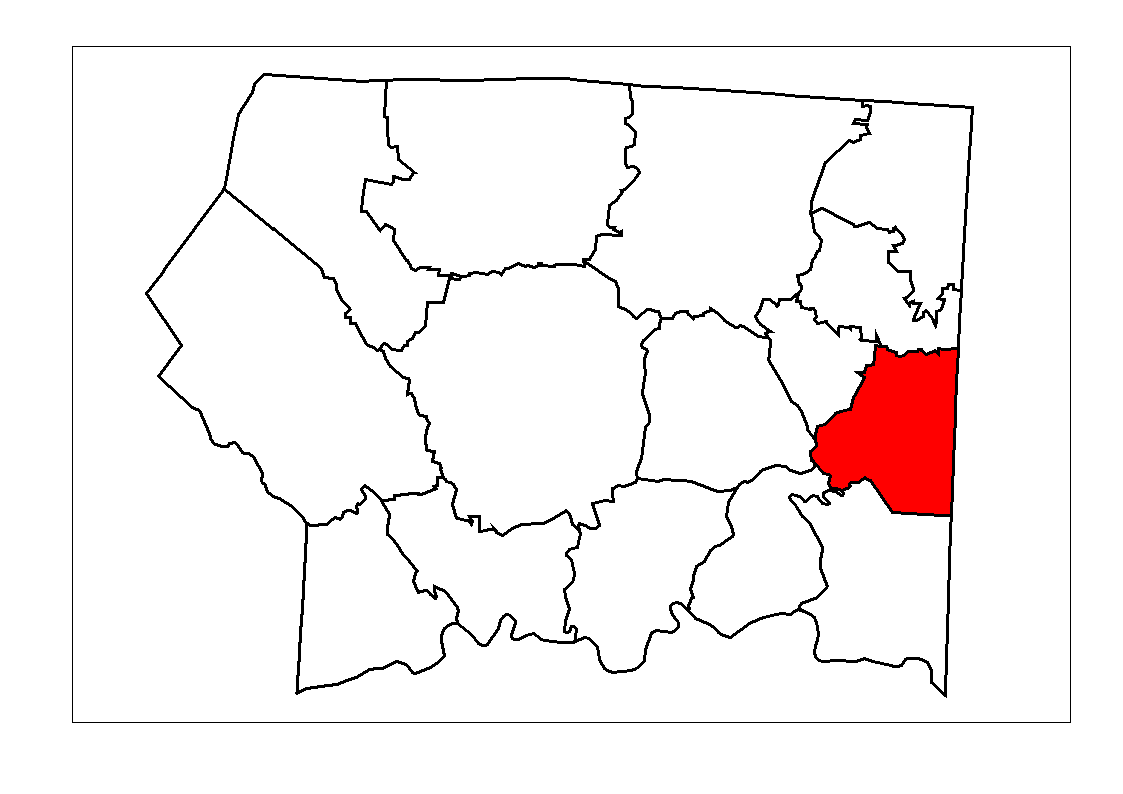
Location of Pilot Township in Surry County, N.C.

Pilot Township is one of fifteen townships in Surry County, North Carolina, United States. The township had a population of 4,085 according to the 2020 census.

Geographically, Pilot Township occupies 23.1 square miles (60 km^{2}) in eastern Surry County. The only incorporated municipality within Pilot Township is the Town of Pilot Mountain. Pilot Township is named for the landmark peak of Pilot Mountain
