= Franklin Township, Sampson County, North Carolina =

Franklin Township
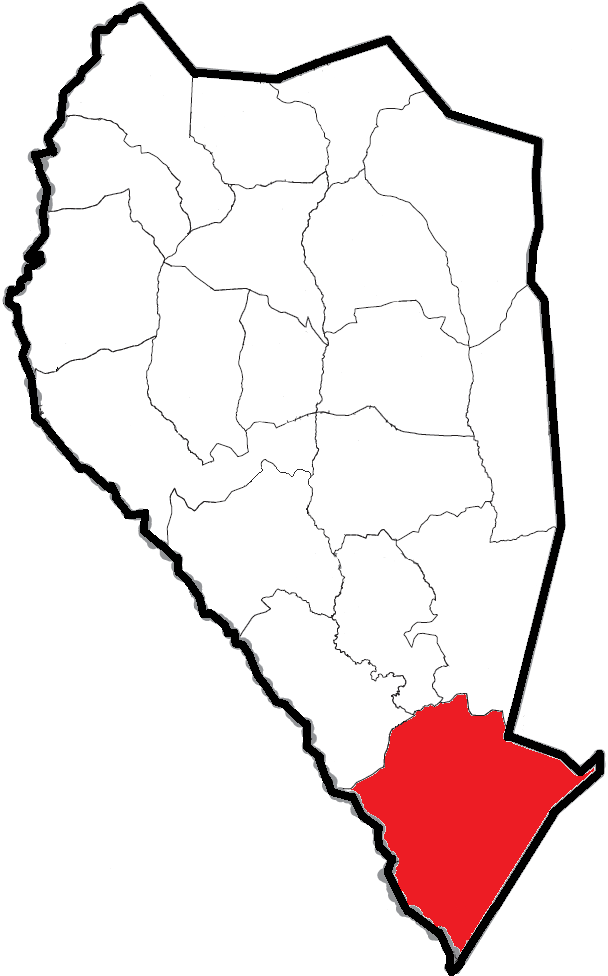
- Location of Franklin Township within Sampson County

- Location of Sampson County within North Carolina
- Country: United States
- State: North Carolina
- County: Sampson

Area
  - Total: 100 sq mi (258 km^{2})

Population (2020)
  - Total: 1,905
  - Estimate (2023): 2,163
- Time zone: UTC-5 (EST)
  - Summer (DST): UTC-4 (EDT)
- Area codes: 910, 472

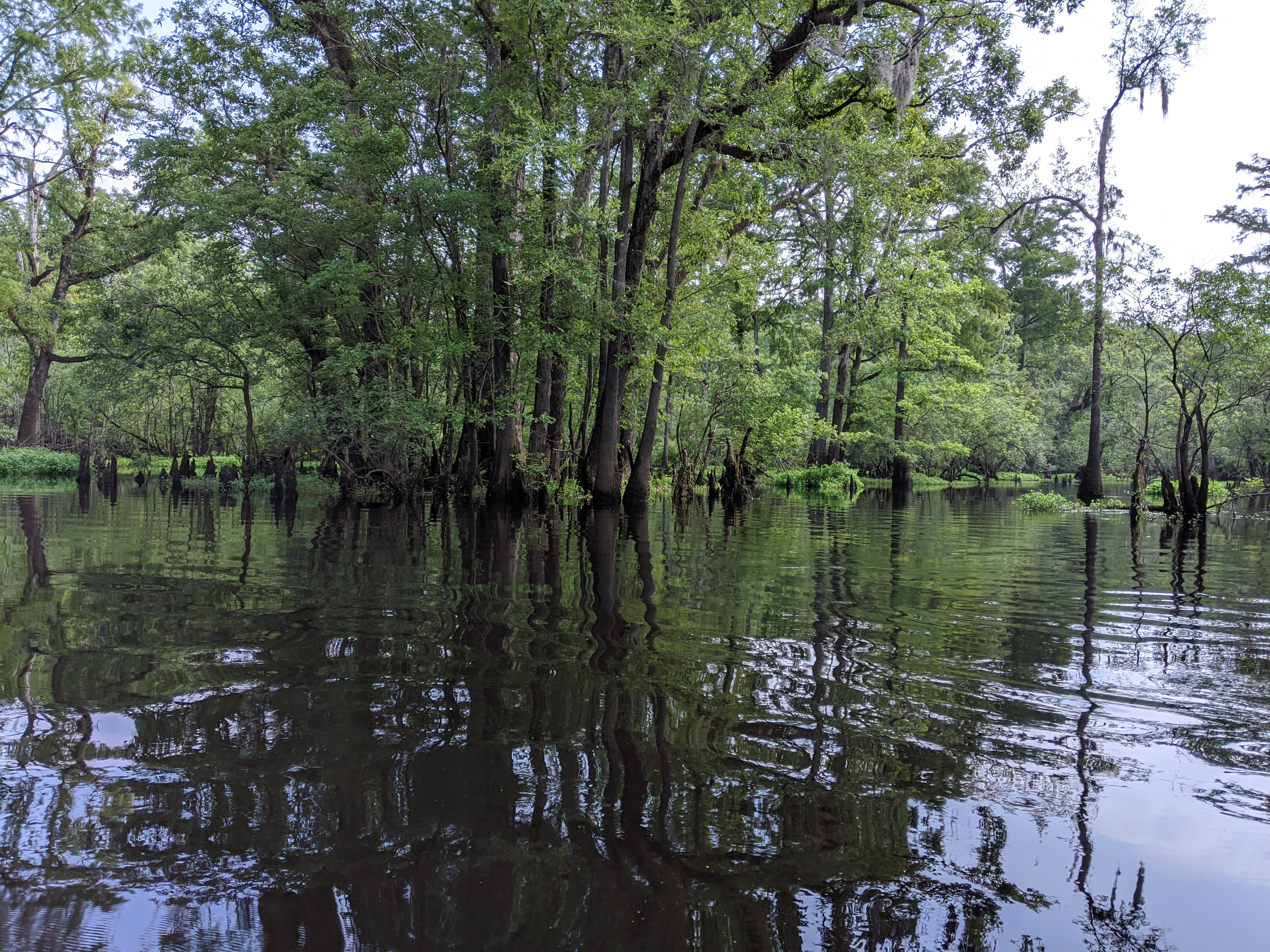
The Black River, which partially forms the western border of Franklin Township

Franklin Township is a township in Sampson County, North Carolina, United States.

== Geography ==
Franklin Township is one of 19 townships within Sampson County. It is 99.5 square miles (258 km^{2}) in total area, and is the southernmost township in the county.

Communities within Franklin Township include Harrells and Ivanhoe. The Black River and South River form the western border of the township.

Franklin Township is bordered to the northwest by South River Township, to the north by Lisbon Township and Taylors Bridge Township, to the northeast by Duplin County, to the southeast by Pender County, and to the southwest by Bladen County.

== Population ==
In 2020, the population of Franklin Township was 1,905.

In 2023, the estimated population of the township was 2,163.

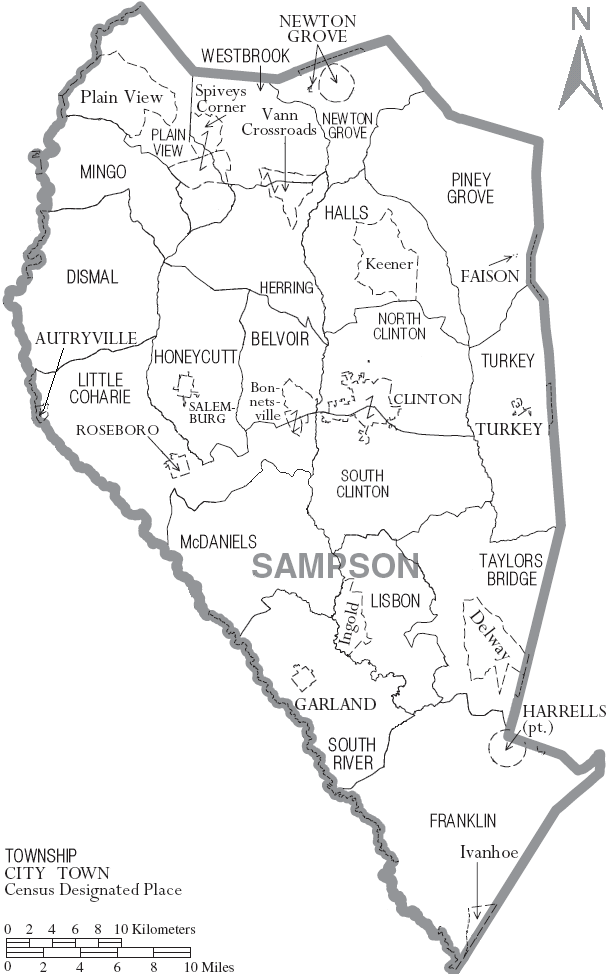
Map of Sampson County with municipal and township labels
