= Smoky Creek Township, Burke County, North Carolina =

Township in Burke County, North Carolina, U.S.

Coordinates: 35°48′21″N 81°36′50″W

Smokey Creek Township is a small township in Burke County, North Carolina, close to the Caldwell County line. As of the 2022 census, the population was 554, of which 99% were white.
