= Swift Creek Township, Wake County, North Carolina =

Township in Wake County, North Carolina, U.S.

Coordinates: 35.710555°N 78.7249469°W

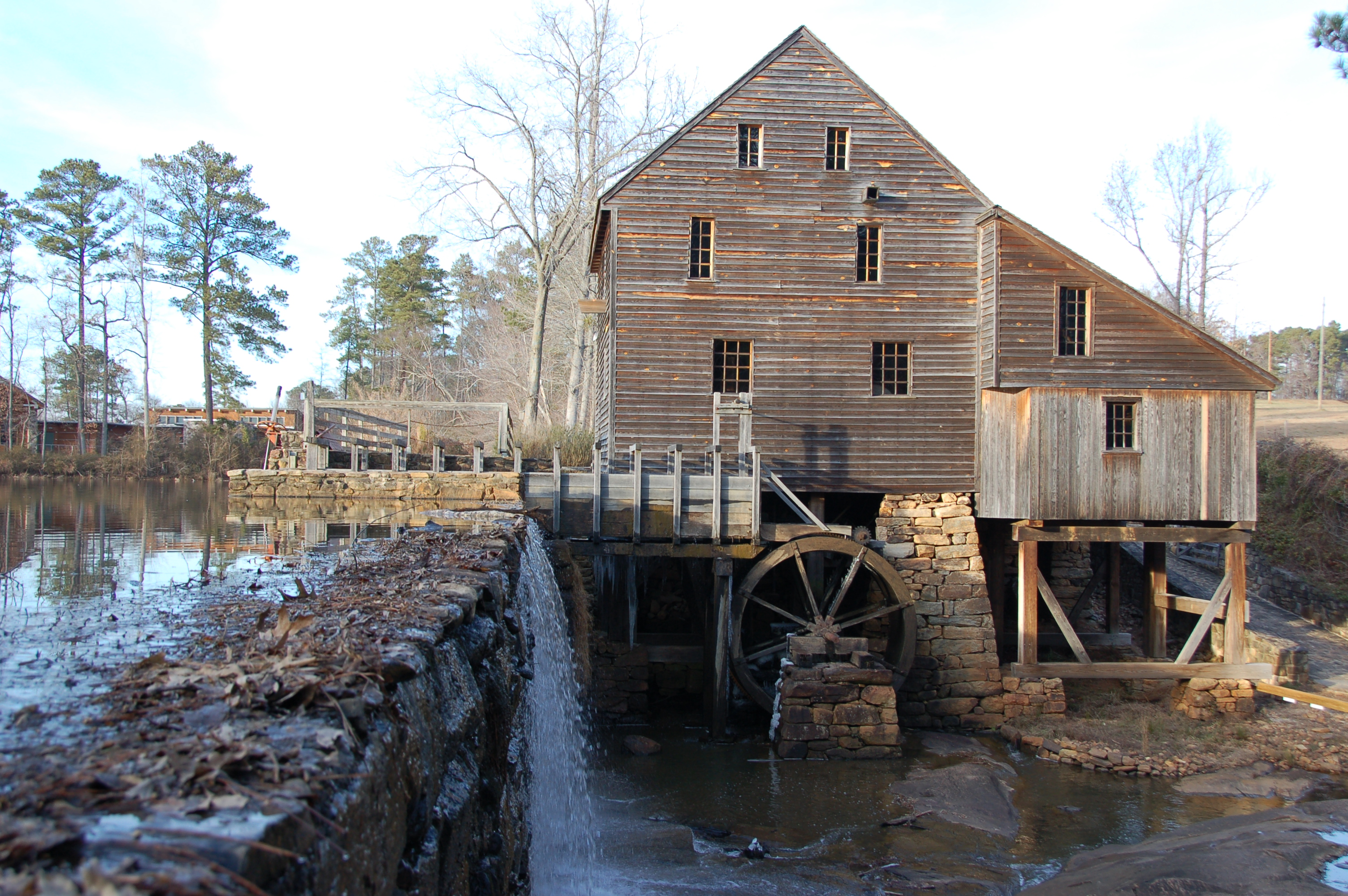
The Yates Mill, located in the township.

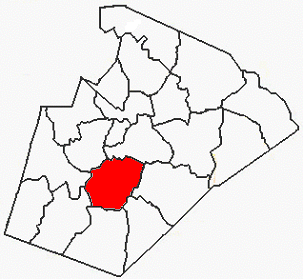

Swift Creek Township (also designated Township 18) is one of twenty townships within Wake County, North Carolina, United States. As of the 2010 United States census, Swift Creek Township had a population of 50,225, a 41.6% increase over 2000.

Swift Creek Township, occupying 44.6 square miles (115.5 km^{2}) in south-central Wake County, includes portions of the towns of Cary and Garner and of the city of Raleigh.

Swift Creek is also an unincorporated community within Wake County, located between the municipalities of Raleigh, Cary, Apex, and Garner.

A non-binding referendum on incorporation for the Swift Creek area was held in November 2000. Out of 4,220 votes cast, 2,492 (58%) voted in favor of incorporation.
