= Litaker Township, Rowan County, North Carolina =

Township in Rowan County, North Carolina, U.S.

Coordinates: 35.55°N 80.46°W

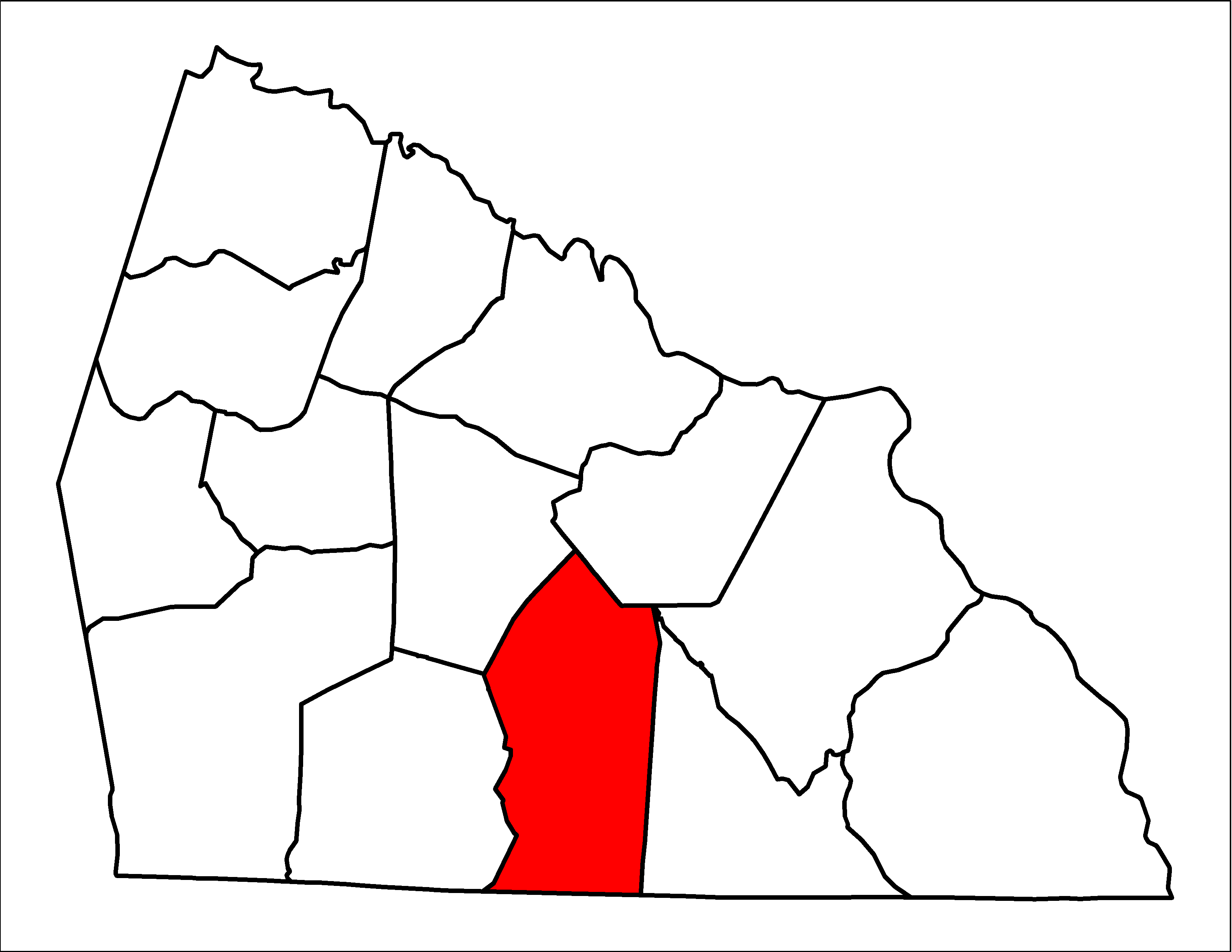
Location of Litaker Township in Rowan County, N.C.

Litaker Township is one of fourteen townships in Rowan County, North Carolina, United States. The township had a population of 10,299 according to the 2000 census.

Geographically, Litaker Township occupies 39.92 square miles (103.4 km^{2}) in south-central Rowan County. Incorporated municipalities here include Faith and small portions of the city of Salisbury, the county seat of Rowan County. The township's southern border is with Cabarrus County.
