= Cross Creek Township, Cumberland County, North Carolina =

Civil township in North Carolina, U.S.

Coordinates: 35°05′19″N 78°53′59″W

Cross Creek Township is a civil township in Cumberland County, North Carolina. The population was 66,163 at the 2010 census.
