= South River Township, Sampson County, North Carolina =

South River Township
- Township
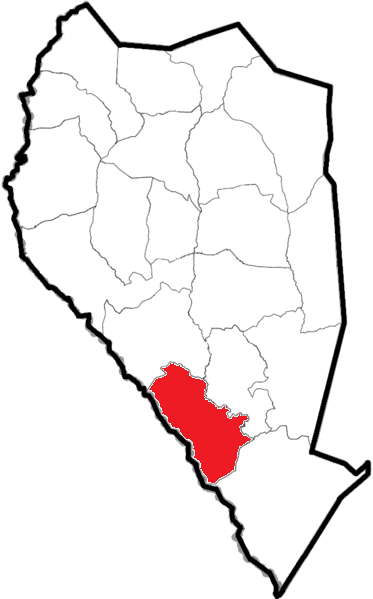
- Location of South River Township within Sampson County

- Location of Sampson County within North Carolina
- Coordinates: 34.78°N 78.37°W
- Country: United States
- State: North Carolina
- County: Sampson

Area
  - Land: 49.8 sq mi (129 km^{2})

Population (2020)
  - Total: 1,609
  - Estimate (2023): 2,402
- Time zone: UTC-5 (EST)
  - Summer (DST): UTC-4 (EDT)
- Area codes: 910, 472

South River Township is a township in Sampson County, North Carolina, United States.

== Geography ==
South River Township is one of 19 townships within Sampson County. It is 49.8 square miles (129 km^{2}) in land area. The township is located in southern Sampson County.

Communities within South River Township include Garland and Mintz. The South River forms the western border of the township.

South River Township is bordered to the north by McDaniels Township, to the east by Lisbon Township, to the south by Franklin Township, and to the west by Bladen County.

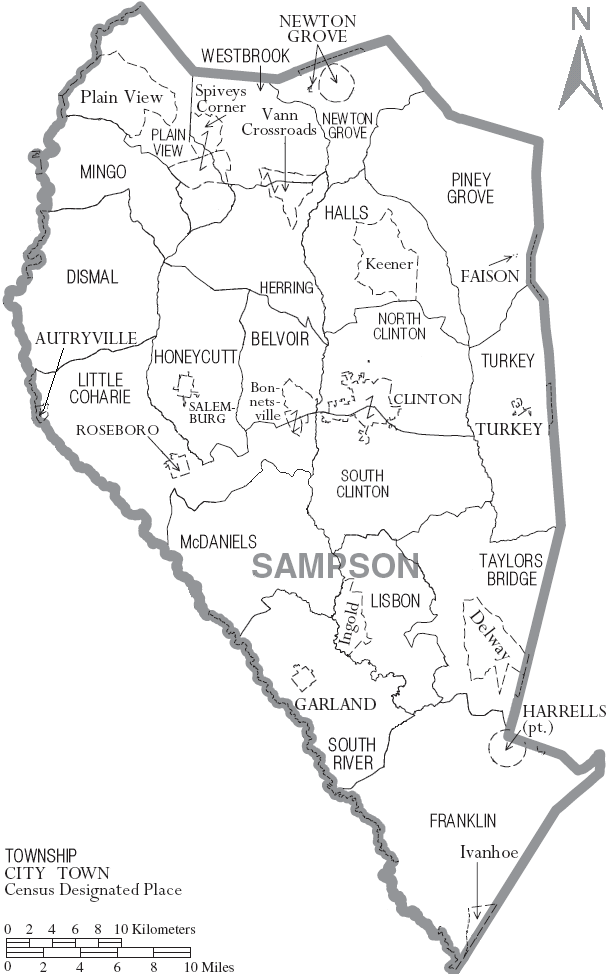
Map of Sampson County with municipal and township labels

== Population ==
In 2020, the population of South River Township was 1,609.

In 2023, the estimated population of the township was 2,402.
