= White Oak Township, Wake County, North Carolina =

Coordinates: 35.736724°N 78.781006°W

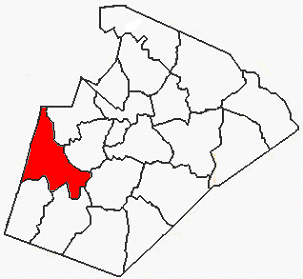

White Oak Township (also designated Township 20) is one of twenty townships within Wake County, North Carolina, United States. As of the 2010 United States census, White Oak Township had a population of 72,894, an 88.3% increase over 2000.

White Oak Township, occupying 52.9 square miles (137.1 km^{2}) in western Wake County, includes the bulk of the town of Apex and portions of the town of Cary.
