= Rockfish Township, Cumberland County, North Carolina =

Coordinates: 35.9677°N 78.9513°W

Rockfish Township was an unincorporated township in Cumberland County, North Carolina. The population was 55,819 at the 2010 census.

In 2009 the City of Fayetteville, North Carolina annexed 'Rockfish Township'.
