= Panther Branch Township, Wake County, North Carolina =

Township in Wake County, North Carolina

Coordinates: 35.6275055°N 78.6455475°W

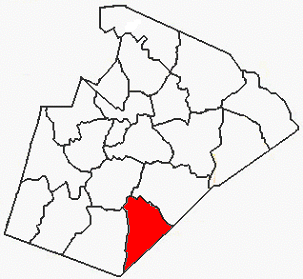

Panther Branch Township (also designated Township 15) is one of the twenty townships within Wake County, North Carolina, United States. At the 2010 United States census, Panther Branch Township had a population of 24,019, a 61.8% increase over 2000.

Panther Branch Township, occupying 39.1 square miles (101.3 km^{2}) in southern Wake County, includes small portions of the town of Garner.
