= Siloam Township, Surry County, North Carolina =

Township in Surry County, North Carolina, U.S.

Coordinates: 36°19′00″N 80°34′22″W

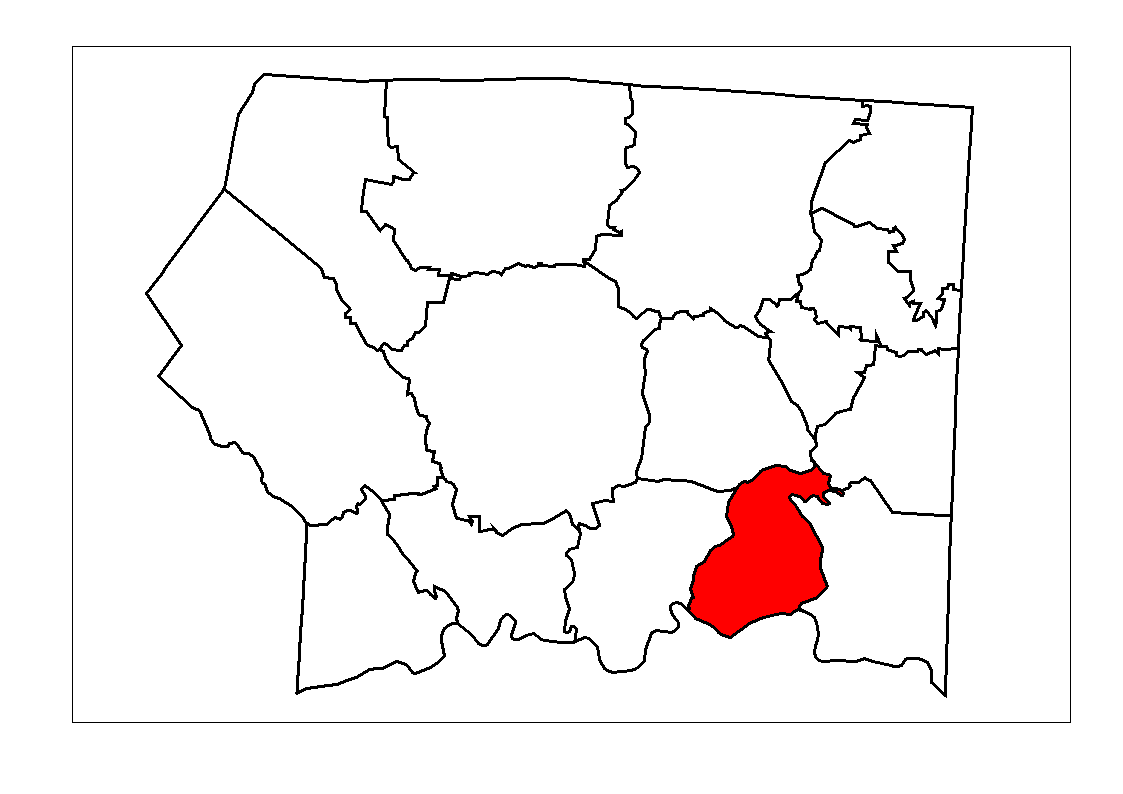
Location of Siloam Township in Surry County, N.C.

Siloam Township is one of fifteen townships in Surry County, North Carolina, United States. The township had a population of 1,091 according to the 2020 census, making it the smallest township in Surry County by population.

Geographically, Siloam Township occupies 20.2 square miles (52 km^{2}) in southern Surry County, with its southern border consisting of the Yadkin River. There are no incorporated municipalities within Siloam Township; however, there are several smaller, unincorporated communities, including the community of Siloam.
