= Raleigh Township, Wake County, North Carolina =

Township in Wake County, North Carolina, U.S.

Coordinates: 35.7666°N 78.6333°W

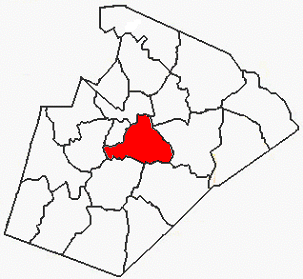

Raleigh Township (also designated Township 1) is one of twenty townships within Wake County, North Carolina, United States. As of the 2010 United States census, Raleigh Township had a population of 117,838, a 6.5% increase over 2000.

Raleigh Township, occupying 37.5 square miles (97.2 km^{2}) in central Wake County, is almost completely occupied by portions of the city of Raleigh, including the city's downtown area. The township is, for the most part, bounded by the I-440 Raleigh Beltline.
