= Carvers Creek Township, Cumberland County, North Carolina =

Civil township in North Carolina, US

Coordinates: 35.203°N 78.859°W

Carvers Creek Township is a civil township in Cumberland County, North Carolina. The population was 22,866 at the 2010 census.
