= Morgan Township, Rowan County, North Carolina =

Township in Rowan County, North Carolina, U.S.

Coordinates: 35.5457556°N 80.2990246°W

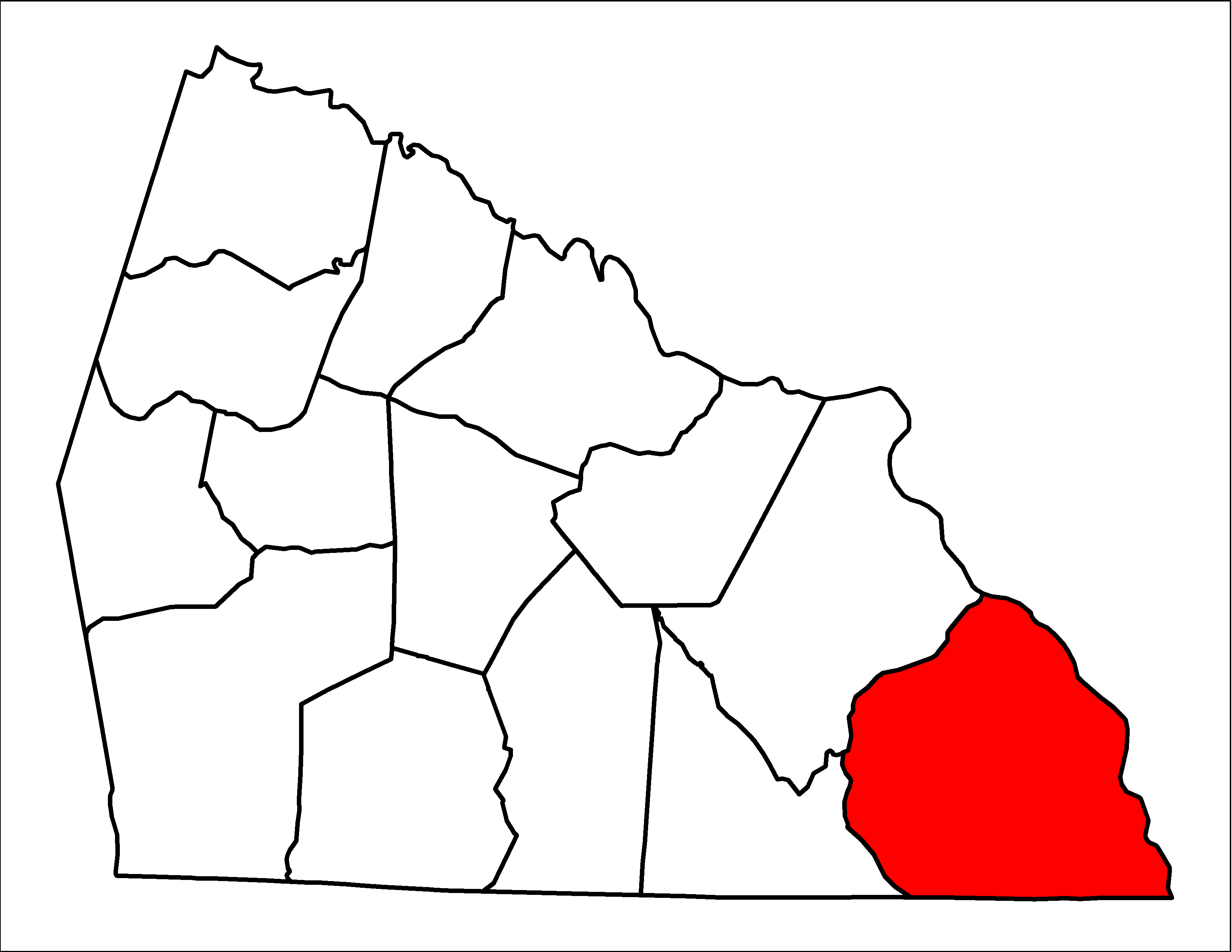
Location of Morgan Township in Rowan County, N.C.

Morgan Township is one of 14 townships in Rowan County, North Carolina, United States. The township had a population of 3,439 according to the 2020 census.

Geographically, Morgan Township occupies 56.3 square miles (146 km^{2}) in southeastern Rowan County and is the largest township by land area in Rowan County. There are no incorporated municipalities in Morgan Township. The township's eastern border is with the Yadkin River and the township contains a portion of High Rock Lake.
