= Wilmington Township, North Carolina =

Township in New Hanover County, North Carolina, US

Coordinates: 34°13′01″N 77°53′43″W

Wilmington Township, located in New Hanover County, North Carolina, is a statistical township consisting of most of Wilmington City and parts of the former Masonboro and Seagate CDPs.

== Demographics ==
Historical population
Census	Pop.	Note	%±
1970	46,169		—
1980	44,000		−4.7%
1990	55,283		25.6%
2000	75,563		36.7%
2010	106,476		40.9%
2020	115,451		8.4%
