= Atkinson, North Carolina =

- Town
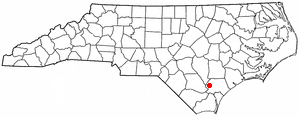
- Location of Atkinson, North Carolina

- Location within North Carolina Location within the United States Location within North America
- Coordinates: 34°31′39″N 78°10′11″W
- Country: United States
- State: North Carolina
- County: Pender

Government
  - Mayor: Gary Alsup

Area
  - Total: 0.99 sq mi (2.56 km^{2})
  - Land: 0.99 sq mi (2.56 km^{2})
  - Water: 0 sq mi (0.00 km^{2})
- Elevation: 62 ft (19 m)

Population (2020)
  - Total: 296
  - Density: 299.0/sq mi (115.46/km^{2})
- Time zone: UTC-5 (Eastern (EST))
  - Summer (DST): UTC-4 (EDT)
- ZIP code: 28421
- Area codes: 910, 472
- FIPS code: 37-02460
- GNIS feature ID: 2405178
- Website: www.atkinsonnc.org

Atkinson is a town in Pender County, North Carolina, United States. As of the 2020 census, Atkinson had a population of 296. It is part of the Wilmington Metropolitan Statistical Area. The town was incorporated in 1909.

== History ==
The name "Atkinson" first appeared on a Pender County Deed in 1890, however the Town of Atkinson was not incorporated until 1909. The town was founded by a man named William Hezekiah Lewis who used 100 acres deeded to him by his mother to start the town. The engineer named Roger P. Atkinson is the person who laid out the town squares and building lots and the town’s name after him. The Town Map was drawn out in 1890 and recorded in 1902

== Geography ==
According to the United States Census Bureau, the town has a total area of 1.0 square mile (2.6 km^{2}), all land.

== Demographics ==
Historical population
Census	Pop.	Note	%±
1910	115		—
1920	296		157.4%
1930	331		11.8%
1940	312		−5.7%
1950	294		−5.8%
1960	302		2.7%
1970	325		7.6%
1980	298		−8.3%
1990	275		−7.7%
2000	236		−14.2%
2010	299		26.7%
2020	296		−1.0%
2023 (est.)	336	▲	13.5%
U.S. Decennial Census

As of the census of 2000, there were 236 people, 106 households, and 71 families residing in the town. The population density was 238.5 inhabitants per square mile (92.1/km^{2}). There were 117 housing units at an average density of 118.3 per square mile (45.7/km^{2}). The racial makeup of the town was 89.41% White and 10.59% African American. Hispanic or Latino of any race were 2.12% of the population.

There were 106 households, out of which 25.5% had children under the age of 18 living with them, 54.7% were married couples living together, 8.5% had a female householder with no husband present, and 32.1% were non-families. 30.2% of all households were made up of individuals, and 14.2% had someone living alone who was 65 years of age or older. The average household size was 2.23 and the average family size was 2.76.

In the town, the population was spread out, with 21.6% under the age of 18, 8.1% from 18 to 24, 25.4% from 25 to 44, 27.1% from 45 to 64, and 17.8% who were 65 years of age or older. The median age was 40 years. For every 100 females, there were 82.9 males. For every 100 females age 18 and over, there were 88.8 males.

The median income for a household in the town was $34,375, and the median income for a family was $45,417. Males had a median income of $30,417 versus $22,813 for females. The per capita income for the town was $18,135. About 4.6% of families and 10.0% of the population were below the poverty line, including 13.7% of those under the age of eighteen and 10.5% of those 65 or over.
