= St. Mary's Township, Wake County, North Carolina =

Township in Wake County, North Carolina, U.S.

Coordinates: 35.6976114°N 78.5887951°W

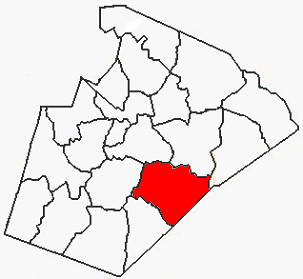

Saint Mary's Township (also designated Township 16) is one of twenty townships within Wake County, North Carolina, United States. As of the 2010 United States census, Saint Mary's Township had a population of 58,484, a 52.8% increase over 2000.

Saint Mary's Township, occupying 60.5 square miles (156.6 km^{2}) in southeastern Wake County, includes most of the town of Garner and portions of the city of Raleigh.
