= New Hope Township, Iredell County, North Carolina =

Coordinates: 36°00′56″N 80°57′26″W

New Hope Township
- Township
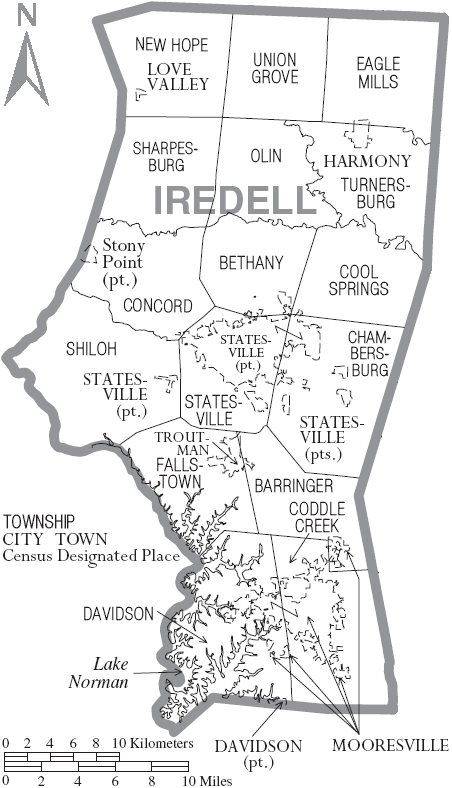
- New Hope Township in Iredell County

- New Hope Township
- Country: United States
- State: North Carolina
- County: Iredell
- Established: 1868

Government
  - Type: non-functioning administrative subdivision

Area
  - Total: 36.25 sq mi (93.9 km^{2})
  - Land: 36.18 sq mi (93.7 km^{2})
  - Water: 0.07 sq mi (0.18 km^{2})

Population (2010)
  - Total: 1,662
  - Density: 45.9/sq mi (17.7/km^{2})

New Hope Township is a non-functioning administrative division of Iredell County, North Carolina, United States. By the requirements of the North Carolina Constitution of 1868, the counties were divided into townships, which included New Hope township as one of sixteen townships in Iredell County.

== Geography ==
New Hope township contains the town of Love Valley (population of 90 in 2010). Highways 901 and 115 are the only major state roads in New Hope Township. Other significant landmarks in this township are:

- Barger School
- Friendship Baptist Church
- Grassy Knob Baptist Church, founded in 1789
- Love Valley (town founded by Andy Barker in 1963)
- New Hope (town)
- New Prospect Baptist Church
- Sandy Ridge United Methodist Church
- Taylor Springs Baptist Church, founded in 1852
