= North Carolina Highway 138 =

State highway in Stanly County, North Carolina, US

North Carolina Highway 138

Route information
- Maintained by NCDOT
- Length: 13.6 mi (21.9 km)
- Existed: 1973–present

Major junctions
- South end: NC 742 in Oakboro
- North end: US 52 near Albemarle

Location
- Country: United States
- State: North Carolina
- Counties: Stanly

Highway system
- North Carolina Highway System; Interstate; US; State; Scenic
← NC 137	→ I-140

North Carolina Highway 138 (NC 138) is a primary state highway in the U.S. state of North Carolina. It serves to connect the community of Aquadale to nearby Oakboro and Albemarle.

== Route description ==
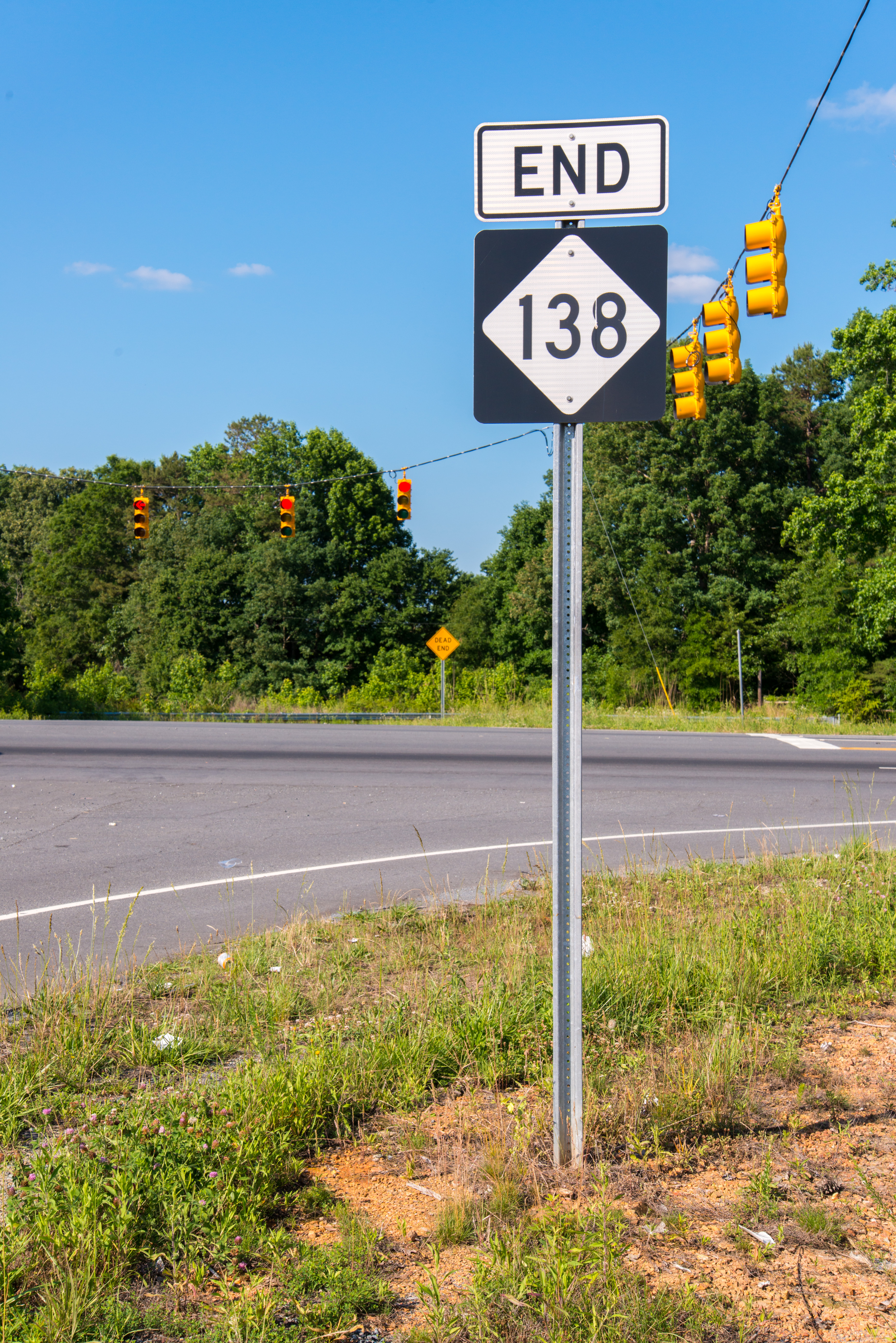
End of NC 138 at US 52

NC 138 is a two-lane rural highway that begins immediately after NC 742 begins in downtown Oakboro. Going east, it crosses over Long Creek, a tributary of the Rocky River, then proceeds northeast to Aquadale. After crossing a railroad track in Aquadale it goes north to end at U.S. Route 52 (US 52) just south of Albemarle.

== History ==
NC 138 was established in 1973 as a new primary routing from NC 742 in Oakboro, through Aquadale, to US 52/NC 24/NC 27/NC 73 in Albemarle. In 2010, NC 138's northern terminus was truncated further south along a new routing of US 52.

== Junction list ==
The entire route is in Stanly County.

Location	mi	km	Destinations	Notes
Oakboro	0.0	0.0	NC 742 (Main Street) to NC 205 – Burnsville	
	13.6	21.9	US 52 – Wadesboro, Salisbury	
1.000 mi = 1.609 km; 1.000 km = 0.621 mi
