= North Carolina Highway 742 =

State highway in North Carolina, US

North Carolina Highway 742

Route information
- Maintained by NCDOT
- Length: 35.9 mi (57.8 km)
- Existed: 1936–present

Major junctions
- South end: SC 742 at the South Carolina line near Chesterfield, SC
- US 52 / US 74 / NC 109 in Wadesboro
- North end: NC 205 in Oakboro

Location
- Country: United States
- State: North Carolina
- Counties: Anson, Union, Stanly

Highway system
- North Carolina Highway System; Interstate; US; State; Scenic
← NC 740	→ NC 751

North Carolina Highway 742 (NC 742) is a primary state highway in the U.S. state of North Carolina. It connects the city of Wadesboro with the towns of Oakboro and Chesterfield, South Carolina.

== Route description ==
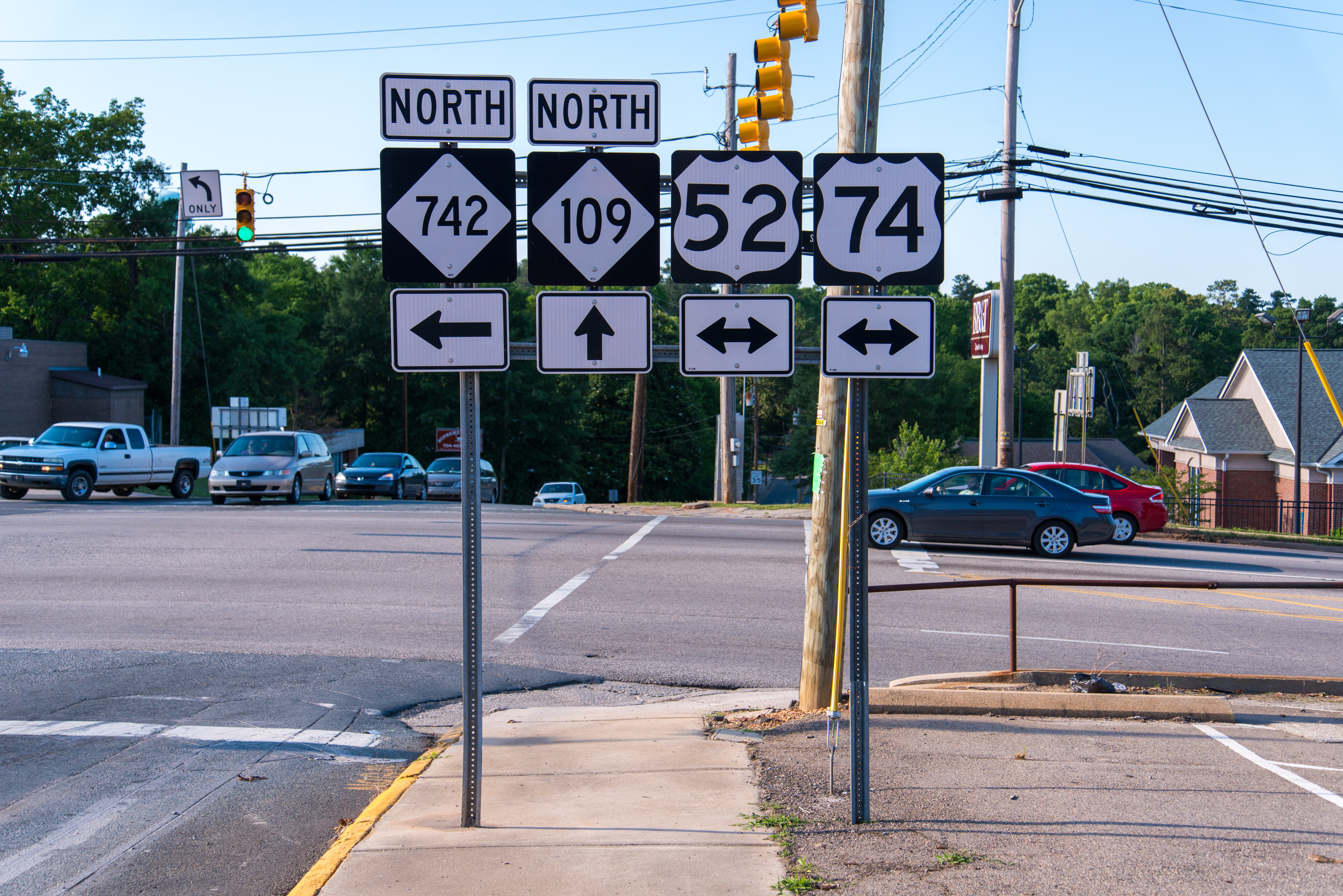
NC 742 overlaps with highways shown here, in Wadesboro

NC 742 is a predominantly two-lane rural highway that begins at the South Carolina state line, where continuing south on South Carolina Highway 742 (SC 742) would lead to Chesterfield. In Wadesboro, it first runs concurrent with NC 109 before going through the downtown area. At the intersection of Caswell and Greene Streets, NC 742 switches from NC 109, which continues north to Mount Gilead, onto U.S. Route 52 (US 52) and US 74. 1.1 miles (1.8 km) later, NC 742 splits from US 74, which continues west towards Charlotte. After another three-tenths mile (0.48 km) and passing over the CSX rail line (originally known as the Seaboard Line), NC 742 splits with US 52, which continues north towards Albemarle.

For the next 17 miles (27 km), NC 742 travels through farmlands of northwestern Anson County, with the community of Burnsville located in the middle of it. NC 742 continues through the northeastern corner of Union County for 2.7 miles (4.3 km), with no major junctions. After crossing the Rocky River, it enters Stanly County; 2.3 miles (3.7 km) later it crosses into Oakboro city limits. As it nears its end in downtown Oakboro, it connects with NC 138 which towards Aquadale and Albemarle. Two blocks further, it ends at the intersection of Main and Second Street, with NC 205, which continues north to Red Cross and southwest to New Salem and Marshville.

== History ==
NC 742 was established in 1936 as a new primary routing from US 74 in Wadesboro to NC 205 in Oakboro. Around 1947, NC 742 was extended south, over part of US 74 and NC 109, to the South Carolina state line, where it continues south as SC 742 (originally SC 850). In 1996, the routings of US 52 and NC 742 were adjusted in Wadesboro; they were removed from Salisbury Street and onto a new road further west that crossed over the railroad tracks.

== Junction list ==
County	Location	mi	km	Destinations	Notes
Anson		0.0	0.0	SC 742 south – Chesterfield	South Carolina state line
Anson	Wadesboro	10.7	17.2	NC 109 south (Camden Road) – Mount Croghan	South end of NC 109 overlap
Anson	Wadesboro	11.5	18.5	US 52 south / US 74 east (Caswell Street) – Rockingham, Cheraw NC 109 north (Greene Street) – Mount Gilead	South end of US 52 and east end of US 74 overlap North end of NC 109 overlap
Anson	Wadesboro	12.6	20.3	US 74 west – Monroe, Charlotte	West end of US 74 overlap
Anson	Wadesboro	12.9	20.8	US 52 north – Ansonville, Albemarle, Salisbury	North end of US 52 overlap
Union	No major junctions				
Stanly	Oakboro	35.8	57.6	NC 138 north (Aquadale Road) – Albemarle	
Stanly	Oakboro	35.9	57.8	NC 205 (Main Street / Second Street) – Albemarle, Red Cross, New Salem, Marshville	
1.000 mi = 1.609 km; 1.000 km = 0.621 mi: Concurrency terminus
