= West Stanly High School =

American public school in North Carolina

Location
- 306 East Red Cross Rd; Oakboro, North Carolina 28129; United States; 35°16′04″N 80°20′48″W

Information
- School type: Public
- Founded: 1963 (63 years ago)
- School board: Stanly County Schools Board of Education
- School district: Stanly County Schools
- Superintendent: Terry Griffin
- CEEB code: 342945
- Principal: Anne McLendon
- Staff: 45.36 (FTE)
- Grades: 9–12
- Enrollment: 785 (2023–2024)
- Student to teacher ratio: 17.31
- Language: English
- Colors: Black, green, gold, and white
- Team name: Colts
- Rival: South Stanly High School
- Communities served: Locust, Oakboro, Red Cross, Stanfield, Endy, Frog Pond
- Feeder schools: West Stanly Middle School
- Affiliation: None
- Website: www.wshs.stanlycountyschools.org

West Stanly High School is a public high school located at 306 East Red Cross Rd. in Oakboro, North Carolina, United States. The school is part of the Stanly County Schools district. Its official mascot is the Colt.

== History ==
In 1962, four county high schools—Stanfield, Ridgecrest, Oakboro and Endy—combined to form what is known as West Stanly High School. The class of 1963 was the first graduating class.

=== West Stanly Middle School ===
In the school year 2011–12, Stanly County Schools opened West Stanly Middle School. It was formed out of the upper grades of multiple elementary schools in the western area of Stanly County. It is housed in the school building formerly occupied by Running Creek Elementary School, which was dissolved by the middle school's opening. Started as only a 7–8 school, WSMS added 6th grade the following school year.

== Notable alumni ==
- Rod Broadway – American football coach, currently the head football coach at North Carolina A&T State University
- Quan Sturdivant – American football linebacker, currently a free agent.
- B. J. Hill – American football defensive end, currently on the Cincinnati Bengals.

== See also ==
- Stanly County, North Carolina
