= Stanly County, North Carolina =

County in North Carolina, United States

- County
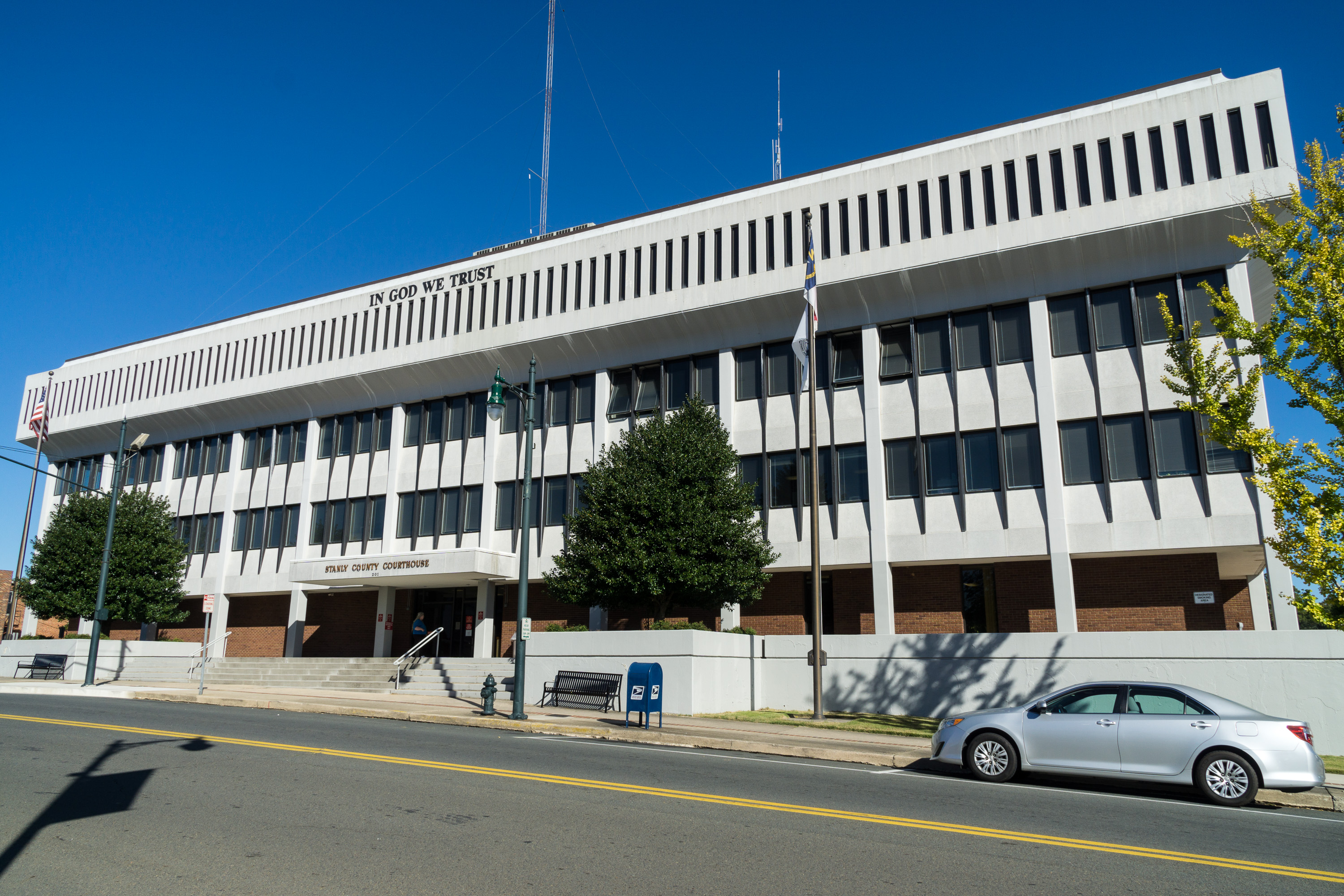
- Stanly County Courthouse in Albemarle

- Seal Logo
- Motto(s): "Water, Air, Land, Success"
- Location within the U.S. state of North Carolina
- Coordinates: 35.31°N 80.25°W
- Country: United States
- State: North Carolina
- Founded: 1841
- Named for: John Stanly
- Seat: Albemarle
- Largest municipality: Albemarle

Area
  - Total: 404.81 sq mi (1,048.5 km^{2})
  - Land: 395.08 sq mi (1,023.3 km^{2})
  - Water: 9.73 sq mi (25.2 km^{2}) 2.40%

Population (2020)
  - Total: 62,504
  - Estimate (2025): 68,830 ▲
  - Density: 158.21/sq mi (61.09/km^{2})
- Time zone: UTC−5 (Eastern)
  - Summer (DST): UTC−4 (EDT)
- Congressional district: 8th
- Website: www.stanlycountync.gov

Stanly County is a county in the U.S. state of North Carolina. As of the 2020 census, the population was 62,504. Its county seat is Albemarle.

Stanly County comprises the Albemarle, NC Micropolitan Statistical Area, which is also included in the Charlotte-Concord, NC-SC Combined Statistical Area.

== History ==
The site of modern-day Stanly County was originally peopled by small tribes of hunter-gatherers and Mound Builders whose artifacts and settlements have been dated back nearly 10,000 years. Large-scale European settlement of the region came in the mid-18th century via two primary waves: immigrants of Dutch, Scots-Irish and German descent moved from Pennsylvania and New Jersey seeking enhanced religious and political tolerance, while immigrants of English backgrounds came to the region from Virginia and the Cape Fear River Basin in Eastern North Carolina.

In early English colonial times, the Stanly County area was politically part of the New Hanover Precinct, out of which the Bladen Precinct was created in 1734. The renamed Bladen County was subdivided to create Anson County in 1750, which in turn spawned Montgomery County in 1779.

Stanly County was formed in 1841 from the part of Montgomery County west of the Pee Dee River. It was named for John Stanly of New Bern (1774–1834), who served several terms in the North Carolina House of Commons and two terms (1801–1803, 1809–1811) in the United States House of Representatives.

=== Hanging of Alec Whitley ===
Whitley was accused of theft and murder in Stanly County and also in Arkansas. Following a short manhunt through several states, he was captured by a local posse near Big Lick in 1892. Shortly after his capture and incarceration a mob of angry citizens gathered at the jail to demand Whitley be turned over to them. Sheriff Snuggs had been alerted to the mob's intention and he transferred all the prisoners from the jail to his own home across the street—except Whitley, who was seized by the mob, beaten, and hanged from a tree off South Street in Albemarle.

=== Name ===
Research by Chris Bramlett indicates that John Stanly had no connection with the area named for him, but that the name was chosen to please state legislators. Bramlett also believed that Stanly's father John Wright Stanly was named Stanley and changed the spelling. Because the county's name was often misspelled, in 1971 the North Carolina General Assembly passed legislation making the "Stanly" spelling official.

== Geography ==
Interactive map of Stanly County

According to the U.S. Census Bureau, the county has a total area of 404.81 square miles (1,048.5 km^{2}), of which 395.08 square miles (1,023.3 km^{2}) is land and 9.73 square miles (25.2 km^{2}) (2.40%) is water.

=== National protected areas/sites ===
- Hardaway Site
- Uwharrie National Forest (part)

=== State and local protected areas ===
- Badin Lake Park
- Locust City Park
- Morrow Mountain State Park
- Pee Dee River Game Land (part)
- Roger F. Snyder Greenway
- Town of Oakboro District Park
- Yadkin River Game Land (part)

=== Major water bodies ===
- Badin Lake
- Big Bear Creek
- Great Pee Dee River
- Island Creek
- Lake Tillery
- Little Bear Creek
- Little Creek
- Little Long Creek
- Long Creek
- Long Lake
- Mountain Creek
- Riles Creek
- Rocky River
- Tuckertown Reservoir
- Yadkin River

=== Adjacent counties ===
- Rowan County – north
- Davidson County – northeast
- Montgomery County – east
- Anson County – south
- Union County – south
- Richmond County – southeast
- Cabarrus County – west

=== Major highways ===
- US 52
- US 52 Bus.
- NC 8
- NC 24
- NC 27
- NC 49
- NC 73
- NC 138
- NC 200
- NC 205
- NC 731
- NC 740
- NC 742

=== Major infrastructure ===
- Stanly County Airport

== Demographics ==
Historical population
Census	Pop.	Note	%±
1850	6,922		—
1860	7,801		12.7%
1870	8,315		6.6%
1880	10,505		26.3%
1890	12,136		15.5%
1900	15,220		25.4%
1910	19,909		30.8%
1920	27,429		37.8%
1930	30,216		10.2%
1940	32,834		8.7%
1950	37,130		13.1%
1960	40,873		10.1%
1970	42,822		4.8%
1980	48,517		13.3%
1990	51,765		6.7%
2000	58,100		12.2%
2010	60,585		4.3%
2020	62,504		3.2%
2025 (est.)	68,830	▲	10.1%
U.S. Decennial Census; 1790–1960 1900–1990; 1990–2000 2010–2020

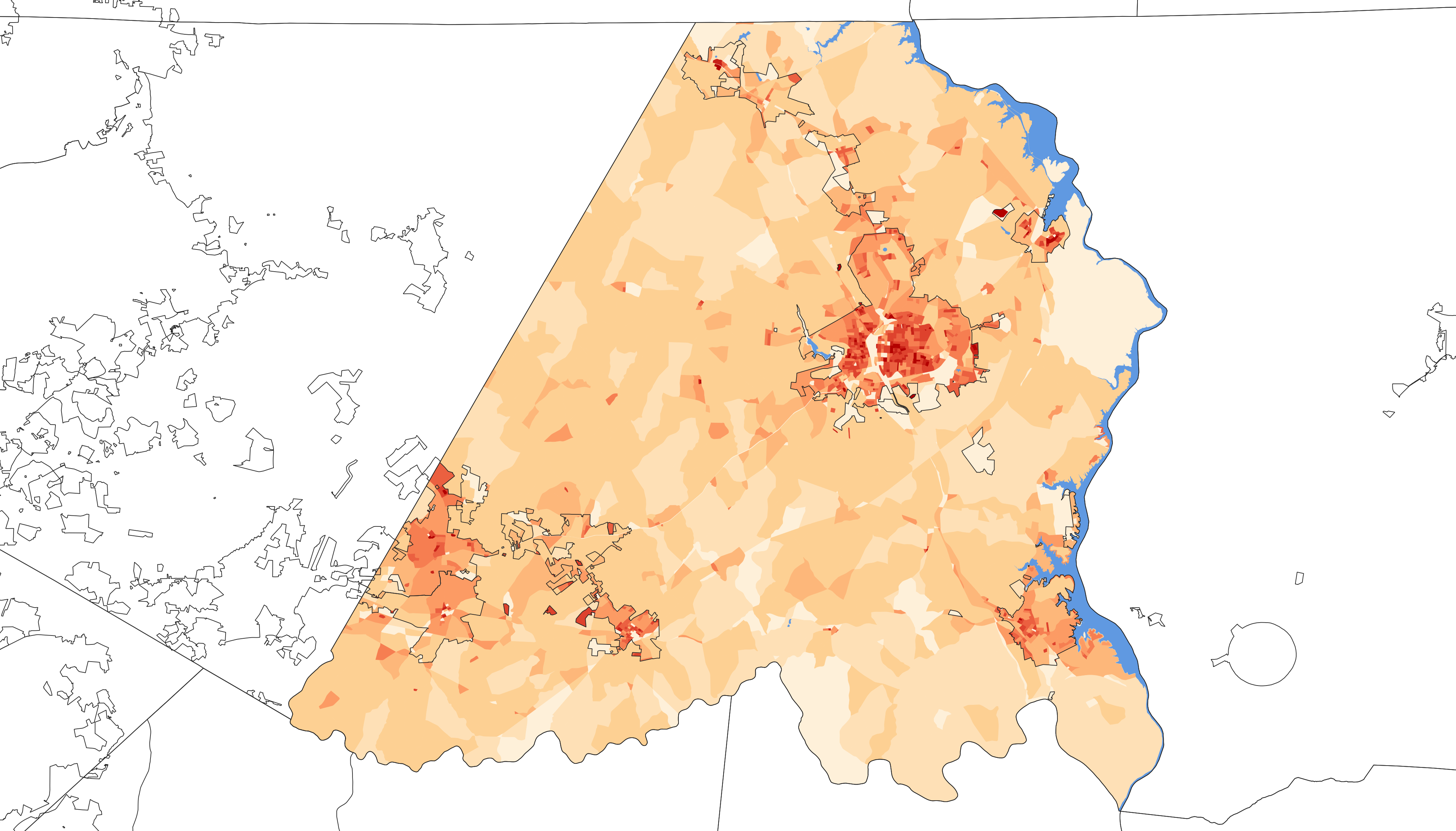
2020 population density of Stanly County NC by census block

=== Racial and ethnic composition ===
Stanly County, North Carolina – Racial and ethnic composition Note: the US Census treats Hispanic/Latino as an ethnic category. This table excludes Latinos from the racial categories and assigns them to a separate category. Hispanics/Latinos may be of any race.
Race / Ethnicity (NH = Non-Hispanic)	Pop 1980	Pop 1990	Pop 2000	Pop 2010	Pop 2020	% 1980	% 1990	% 2000	% 2010	% 2020
White alone (NH)	42,516	45,102	48,611	49,877	48,645	87.63%	87.13%	83.67%	82.33%	77.83%
Black or African American alone (NH)	5,609	5,954	6,641	6,590	7,000	11.56%	11.50%	11.43%	10.88%	11.20%
Native American or Alaska Native alone (NH)	41	153	138	175	210	0.08%	0.30%	0.24%	0.29%	0.34%
Asian alone (NH)	88	243	1,038	1,108	1,140	0.18%	0.47%	1.79%	1.83%	1.82%
Native Hawaiian or Pacific Islander alone (NH)	x	x	9	10	9	x	x	0.02%	0.02%	0.01%
Other race alone (NH)	13	4	21	47	131	0.03%	0.01%	0.04%	0.08%	0.21%
Mixed race or Multiracial (NH)	x	x	405	612	2,283	x	x	0.70%	1.01%	3.65%
Hispanic or Latino (any race)	250	309	1,237	2,166	3,086	0.52%	0.60%	2.13%	3.58%	4.94%
Total	48,517	51,765	58,100	60,585	62,504	100.00%	100.00%	100.00%	100.00%	100.00%

=== 2020 census ===
As of the 2020 census, there were 62,504 people, 24,742 households, and 16,569 families residing in the county. The median age was 42.6 years, with 21.2% of residents under the age of 18 and 19.7% aged 65 years or older. For every 100 females there were 98.6 males, and for every 100 females age 18 and over there were 97.0 males.

The racial makeup of the county was 78.6% White, 11.3% Black or African American, 0.4% American Indian and Alaska Native, 1.8% Asian, <0.1% Native Hawaiian and Pacific Islander, 3.0% from some other race, and 4.7% from two or more races. Hispanic or Latino residents of any race comprised 4.9% of the population.

27.2% of residents lived in urban areas, while 72.8% lived in rural areas.

There were 24,742 households in the county, of which 28.9% had children under the age of 18 living in them. Of all households, 49.5% were married-couple households, 18.0% were households with a male householder and no spouse or partner present, and 26.6% were households with a female householder and no spouse or partner present. About 27.9% of all households were made up of individuals and 13.4% had someone living alone who was 65 years of age or older.

There were 27,685 housing units, of which 10.6% were vacant. Among occupied housing units, 72.1% were owner-occupied and 27.9% were renter-occupied. The homeowner vacancy rate was 1.5% and the rental vacancy rate was 5.8%.

=== 2010 census ===
At the 2010 census, there were 60,585 people. In 2000 there were 22,223 households, and 16,156 families residing in the county. The population density was 147 people per square mile (57 people/km^{2}). There were 24,582 housing units at an average density of 62 units per square mile (24 units/km^{2}). The racial makeup of the county was 84.67% White, 11.46% Black or African American, 0.25% Native American, 1.81% Asian, 0.02% Pacific Islander, 1.01% from other races, and 0.79% from two or more races. 2.13% of the population were Hispanic or Latino of any race.

There were 22,223 households, out of which 32.60% had children under the age of 18 living with them, 58.30% were married couples living together, 10.50% had a female householder with no husband present, and 27.30% were non-families. 24.30% of all households were made up of individuals, and 10.80% had someone living alone who was 65 years of age or older. The average household size was 2.53 and the average family size was 3.00.

In the county, the population was spread out, with 25.00% under the age of 18, 8.40% from 18 to 24, 29.00% from 25 to 44, 23.40% from 45 to 64, and 14.20% who were 65 years of age or older. The median age was 37 years. For every 100 females there were 97.40 males. For every 100 females age 18 and over, there were 94.70 males.

The median income for a household in the county was $36,898, and the median income for a family was $43,956. Males had a median income of $31,444 versus $21,585 for females. The per capita income for the county was $17,825. About 8.10% of families and 10.70% of the population were below the poverty line, including 14.10% of those under age 18 and 10.30% of those age 65 or over.

== Law and government ==
Stanly County is a member of the regional Centralina Council of Governments.

The current sheriff of Stanly County is Jeff Crisco.

=== Politics ===
Stanly is currently a solidly Republican county. It has voted Republican in every presidential election since 1944, with the sole exception of 1976 when Southern Democrat Jimmy Carter carried the county. It did vote Democratic in every election from 1876 to 1900, but since then it has voted solidly Republican except in the 1912 Wilson and 1932 to 1940 Franklin Roosevelt landslides, and with southerners John W. Davis and Carter heading the Democratic tickets.

United States presidential election results for Stanly County, North Carolina
Year	Republican		Democratic		Third party(ies)	
Year	No.	%	No.	%	No.	%
1912	105	3.13%	1,702	50.73%	1,548	46.14%
1916	1,941	47.81%	2,110	51.97%	9	0.22%
1920	4,312	52.88%	3,843	47.12%	0	0.00%
1924	3,594	48.07%	3,832	51.26%	50	0.67%
1928	4,597	60.51%	3,000	39.49%	0	0.00%
1932	3,992	40.63%	5,785	58.87%	49	0.50%
1936	4,523	41.01%	6,505	58.99%	0	0.00%
1940	4,569	41.96%	6,321	58.04%	0	0.00%
1944	6,083	52.52%	5,499	47.48%	0	0.00%
1948	5,902	50.56%	4,415	37.82%	1,357	11.62%
1952	10,093	58.36%	7,202	41.64%	0	0.00%
1956	10,667	61.45%	6,693	38.55%	0	0.00%
1960	11,080	57.29%	8,259	42.71%	0	0.00%
1964	8,924	52.95%	7,931	47.05%	0	0.00%
1968	9,428	51.43%	4,199	22.90%	4,706	25.67%
1972	12,459	69.32%	5,218	29.03%	295	1.64%
1976	8,845	48.63%	9,262	50.93%	80	0.44%
1980	9,734	54.54%	7,784	43.62%	328	1.84%
1984	13,116	68.00%	6,138	31.82%	35	0.18%
1988	11,885	64.13%	6,627	35.76%	20	0.11%
1992	11,030	50.91%	7,735	35.70%	2,899	13.38%
1996	11,446	56.29%	7,131	35.07%	1,756	8.64%
2000	15,548	68.14%	7,066	30.97%	204	0.89%
2004	17,814	69.71%	7,650	29.94%	89	0.35%
2008	19,329	67.81%	8,878	31.14%	299	1.05%
2012	19,904	69.31%	8,431	29.36%	382	1.33%
2016	21,964	73.42%	7,094	23.71%	859	2.87%
2020	25,458	75.01%	8,129	23.95%	352	1.04%
2024	27,518	74.95%	8,881	24.19%	315	0.86%

== Education ==
=== Elementary schools ===
- Aquadale Elementary "Little Bulls"
- Badin Elementary "Watts"
- Carolina Christian School "Lions"
- Central Elementary "Bulldogs"
- East Albemarle Elementary "Bullpups"
- Endy Elementary "Redhawks"
- Locust Elementary "Colts"
- Millingport Elementary "Wildcats"
- Norwood Elementary "Bulls"
- Oakboro Elementary "Eagles"
- Richfield Elementary "Tigers"
- Stanfield Elementary "Wildcats"

=== Middle schools ===
- Albemarle Middle School "Bulldogs"
- Carolina Christian School "Lions"
- North Stanly Middle School "Comets"
- South Stanly Middle School "Bulls"
- West Stanly Middle School "Colts"

=== High schools ===
- Carolina Christian School "Lions"
- Gray Stone Day School "Knights"
- North Stanly High School "Comets"
- South Stanly High School "Bulls"
- Albemarle High School "Bulldogs"
- Stanly Early College "Tigers"
- West Stanly High School "Colts"
- Stanly Academy Learning Center

=== Universities ===
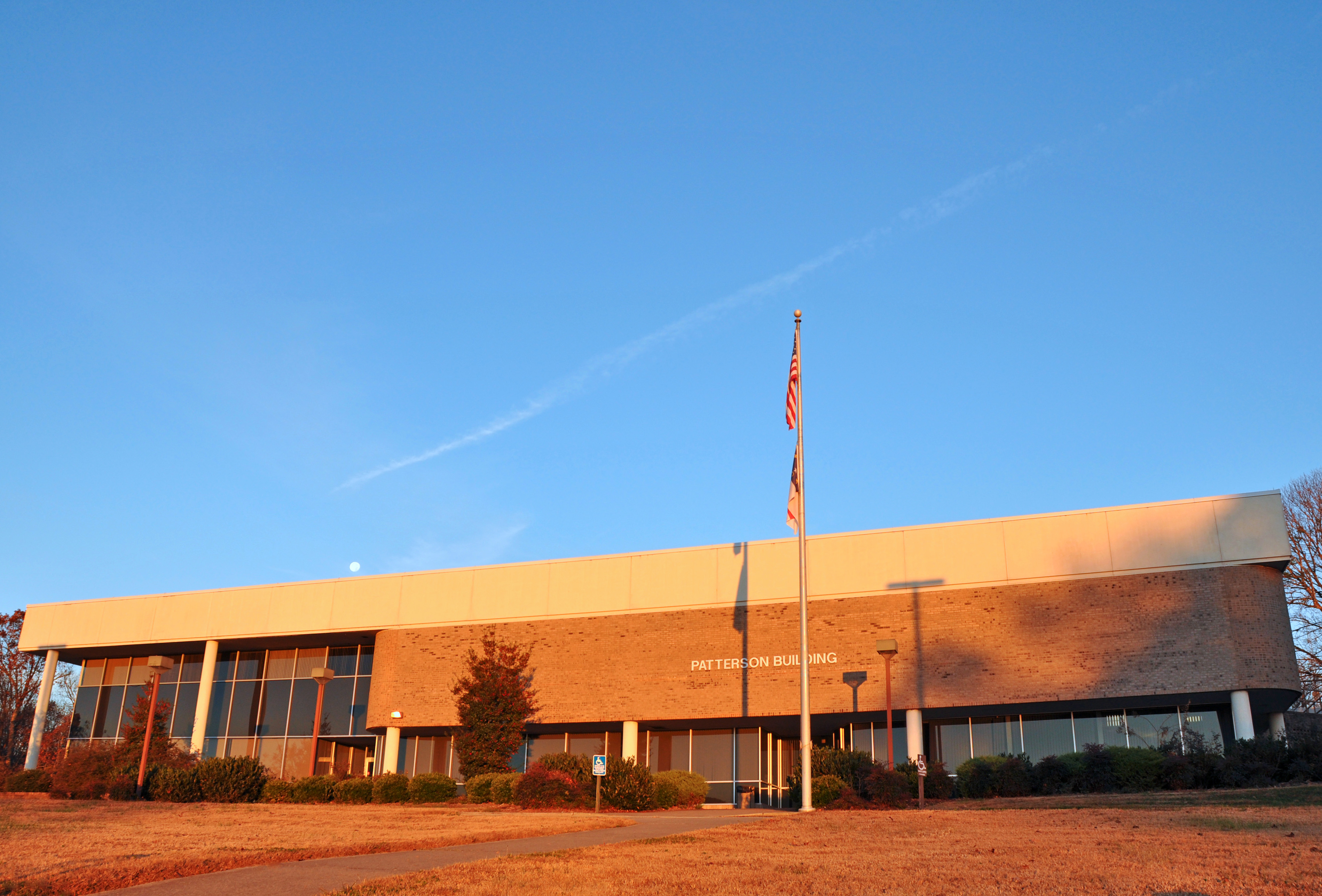
Patterson Building in Stanly Community College campus

- Pfeiffer University "Falcons"
- Stanly Community College "Eagles"

== Media ==
The area is served by The Weekly Post, a weekly newspaper. It is also served by Stanly News Journal, a bi-weekly newspaper that also posts local news on its website.

There are 2 radio stations locally owned by Stanly Communications, Inc. WSPC broadcasts at 1010 AM and 107.3 FM, and the current format is primarily news and conservative talk radio. WZKY broadcasts at 1580 AM and 103.3 FM, and primarily plays music from the 1960s, 1970s, and 1980s.

== Communities ==
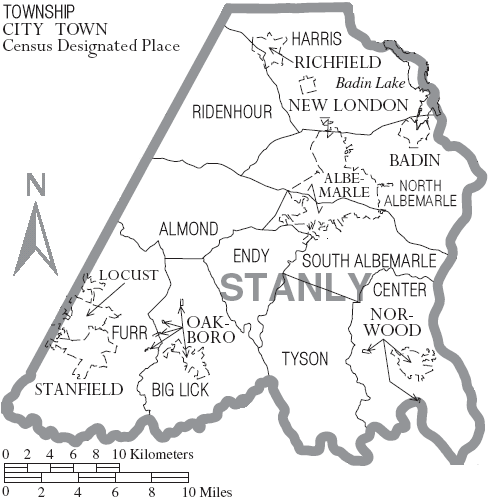
Map of Stanly County with municipal and township labels

=== Cities ===
- Albemarle (county seat and largest municipality)
- Locust (most; small portion in Cabarrus)

=== Towns ===
- Badin
- Misenheimer
- New London
- Norwood
- Oakboro
- Red Cross
- Richfield
- Stanfield

=== Townships ===
- Almond
- Big Lick
- Center
- Endy
- Furr
- Harris
- North Albemarle
- Ridenhour
- South Albemarle
- Tyson

=== Census-designated places ===
- Aquadale
- Millingport

=== Other unincorporated communities ===
- Beetsville
- Big Lick
- Cottonville
- Endy
- Finger
- Frog Pond
- Lambert
- Palestine
- Palmerville
- Plyler
- Porter
- Ridgecrest
- Tuckertown
- Kingville

== See also ==
- List of counties in North Carolina
- National Register of Historic Places listings in Stanly County, North Carolina
