= Quan Sturdivant =

American football player (born 1988)

No. 52
- Position: Linebacker

Personal information
- Born: December 5, 1988 (age 37); Oakboro, North Carolina, U.S.
- Listed height: 6 ft 1 in (1.85 m)
- Listed weight: 241 lb (109 kg)

Career information
- High school: West Stanly (Oakboro)
- College: North Carolina
- NFL draft: 2011: 6th round, 171st overall pick

Career history
- Arizona Cardinals (2011)*; Sacramento Mountain Lions (2012); Kansas City Chiefs (2012)*; Washington Redskins (2013)*
- * Offseason or practice squad member only

Awards and highlights
- First-team All-ACC (2009)
- Stats at Pro Football Reference

Quantavius Sturdivant (born December 5, 1988) is an American former professional football linebacker. He played as a middle linebacker for the University of North Carolina Tar Heels. He was considered one of the top linebackers in the Atlantic Coast Conference (ACC). Sturdivant was selected in the sixth round of the 2011 NFL draft by the Arizona Cardinals at pick number 171.

== Early life ==
Sturdivant was born on December 5, 1988, in Oakboro, North Carolina, U.S. to Marcella Sturdivant. His father is Terry Watkins of Norwood, N.C. He attended West Stanly High School, where he played mostly as a quarterback, but also as a safety. As a senior in 2006, he completed 99 out of 179 pass attempts for 1,794 yards and 21 touchdowns, and made 111 rushing attempts for 745 yards. He also recorded 12 tackles, two broken-up passes, and one interception. He was a three-time all-conference and two-time all-state player, and was named the conference's 2006 offensive player of the year. In 2006, he was named a Charlotte Observer high school player of the week for recording 305 yards, four touchdowns, and 11 tackles in a game. Recruiting analyst Tom Lemming named Sturdivant to his All-Southeast Team. He participated in the 2006 Shrine Bowl as a quarterback. He received scholarship offers from Duke, Florida, NC State, North Carolina, and South Carolina. Sturdivant originally committed to Florida, but a week later reversed course and committed to North Carolina.

== College career ==
As a true freshman for the Tar Heels in 2007, Sturdivant saw action in all 12 games as a linebacker including five starts. He also played a role on special teams. Sturdivant also recorded 47 tackles, including 1.5 for loss, one quarterback sack, one interception, and one blocked punt. He earned first-team Freshman All-ACC honors. In 2008, Sturdivant played in all 13 games and recorded 122 tackles including 87 solo, two sacks, one forced fumble, and two interceptions for 89 yards and a touchdown. Sports Illustrated named him an honorable mention All-American. For the 2009 season, Sturdivant was moved from weakside to middle linebacker, in order to replace Mark Paschal who graduated. He was moved back to the weakside, however, to recapture his success from the previous year. Scout.com included him among its 120 Players You Need to Know feature series, and said of him, "In just two seasons ... he has developed into one of the top young linebackers in the ACC."

On July 10, 2010, Sturdivant was cited for simple possession of marijuana during a traffic stop.

During the 2010 season, Sturdivant played in the first three games and amassed 27 tackles before suffering a hamstring injury at Rutgers, which forced him to miss several games.

== Professional career ==
Pre-draft measurables
Height	Weight	Arm length	Hand span	Wingspan	40-yard dash	10-yard split	20-yard split	20-yard shuttle	Three-cone drill	Vertical jump	Broad jump	Bench press
6 ft 1 in (1.85 m)	241 lb (109 kg)	32 1/2 in (0.83 m)	10 in (0.25 m)	6 ft 3 3/8 in (1.91 m)	4.75 s	1.69 s	2.77 s	4.47 s	7.29 s	34.0 in (0.86 m)	9 ft 7 in (2.92 m)	21 reps
All values from NFL Combine/Pro Day

=== Arizona Cardinals ===
Sturdivant was drafted with the 171st pick in the 2011 NFL draft by the Arizona Cardinals. Sturdivant was cut by the Cardinals before the 2012 NFL season began.

=== Sacramento Mountain Lions ===
He signed by the UFL's Sacramento Mountain Lions.

=== Kansas City Chiefs ===
On November 29, 2012, he was signed to the practice squad of the Kansas City Chiefs.

=== Washington Redskins ===
On August 15, 2013, he was signed by the Washington Redskins. On August 26, 2013, he was waived by the Redskins.

== See also ==
- List of NCAA major college football yearly tackles leaders
