= North Carolina Highway 205 =

State highway in North Carolina, US

North Carolina Highway 205

Route information
- Maintained by NCDOT
- Length: 22.0 mi (35.4 km)
- Existed: 1935–present

Major junctions
- South end: US 74 in Marshville
- North end: NC 24 / NC 27 in Red Cross

Location
- Country: United States
- State: North Carolina
- Counties: Union, Stanly

Highway system
- North Carolina Highway System; Interstate; US; State; Scenic
← NC 200	→ NC 207

North Carolina Highway 205 (NC 205) is a primary state highway in the U.S. state of North Carolina. It traverses 22 miles (35 km) in Stanly and Union Counties.

== Route description ==
View north at the south end of NC 205 at US 74 in Marshville

NC 205 is a two-lane rural highway that goes through mostly farmland, as it connects the towns of Marshville, Oakboro, and Red Cross.

== History ==
Established in 1935, it is the second incarnation NC 205, creating a new primary routing between the towns of Marshville and Red Cross. In the late 1940s, it was extended southwest along Main Street to the new alignment of US 74; it then changed by 1953 onto a new extension of Elm Street to US 74, leaving Main Street.

The first NC 205 was an original state highway (1921), connecting Kings Mountain to Grover. In 1926, US 29 was added to all of NC 205. In late 1934, NC 205 was dropped, leaving behind US 29 and NC 216.

== Junction list ==
County	Location	mi	km	Destinations	Notes
Union	Marshville	0.0	0.0	US 74 (Marshville Boulevard) / Elm Street	
Union	New Salem	10.8	17.4	NC 218 – Mint Hill, Polkton	
Stanly	Oakboro	18.4	29.6	NC 742 south (Main Street) / East 2nd Street – Wadesboro	Northern terminus of NC 742
Stanly	Red Cross	22.0	35.4	NC 24 / NC 27 (Red Cross Road) / Oak Ridge Road – Charlotte, Albemarle	
1.000 mi = 1.609 km; 1.000 km = 0.621 mi
