= Pfeiffer University at Charlotte =

Coordinates: 35.1667°N 80.8497°W

Pfeiffer University at Charlotte, in Charlotte, North Carolina, is one of three campuses of Pfeiffer University, where the university's School of Graduate Studies and Center for Professional Advancement are located. The university also has an undergraduate campus in Misenheimer and another graduate campus in the Triangle, in Morrisville.

In October 2015, Pfeiffer announced plans to sell the 5-acre Park Road campus. Spartanburg, South Carolina-based Johnson Development planned a six-story apartment building with retail space on the ground floor.

The grand opening of the new Pfeiffer campus took place October 18, 2017. The university now occupies 26,440 square feet on the three floors in the Montford Park building (previously called the Park Seneca building) on Mockingbird Lane.
