= Gray Stone Day School =

American public charter school in North Carolina

Location
- 49464 Merner Terrace; Misenheimer, North Carolina 28109; United States
- Coordinates: 35°29′1″N 80°16′35″W

Information
- Type: Public charter
- Established: 2002 (24 years ago)
- Oversight: Helen Nance, Chief Administrative Officer
- CEEB code: 342632
- Principal: Jeff Walter (HS), Pollyanne Rhodes (MS)
- Teaching staff: 42.82 (on FTE basis)
- Grades: 6–12
- Enrollment: 762 (2023–2024)
- Student to teacher ratio: 17.80
- Colors: Garnet and gray
- Athletics conference: Yadkin Valley, NCHSAA
- Mascot: Knight
- Website: graystoneday.org

Gray Stone Day School in Misenheimer, North Carolina, named for Gray Stone Inn in Misenheimer, opened in Fall 2002, is a charter high school and middle school. Previously located in Pfeiffer University's Harris Building, its philosophy has been "what better way to prepare for college than on a college campus". Gray Stone began planning for its own facility in 2005. Pfeiffer donated 18 acres of land and groundbreaking took place in April 2010. On January 4, 2011, Gray Stone students moved into a new $7 million, 53,000-square-foot (4,900 m^{2}) building. In 2012 the school opened a new wing of classrooms to accommodate the largest freshman class in school history.

The first students graduated in 2005, and over 96 percent of graduates have gone to college. 440 students from seven counties attend the high school as of 2016, about half of those coming from Stanly County and a fourth from Rowan County.

Gray Stone was recognized by Newsweek as North Carolina's top high school in 2014.

On May 11, 2016, Gray Stone announced a campaign to raise $1.5 million for a $3.9 million middle school building to house 375 students, to be located next to the high school. The 19,000-square-foot (1,800 m^{2}) 15-classroom building opened November 6, 2017. In 2018, the total number of students was 835.

On Oct 9, 2023, Gray Stone CAO Helen Nance announced that the Board of Directors approved a plan to build a new athletic complex. Construction on the athletic complex is scheduled to begin in 2024. The complex will include a baseball field, softball field, new soccer field, six tennis courts, a track, a concessions building, and new athletic parking.
