= Denico Autry =

American football player (born 1990)

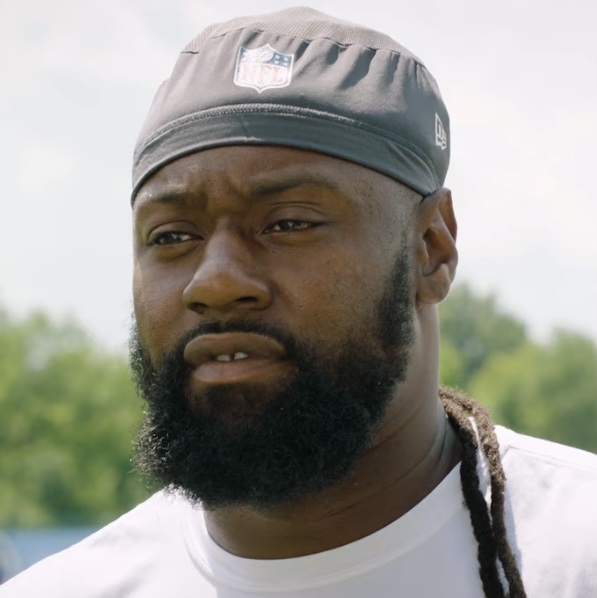
- Autry with the Tennessee Titans in 2021

No. 96
- Position: Defensive end

Personal information
- Born: July 15, 1990 (age 36); Albemarle, North Carolina, U.S.
- Listed height: 6 ft 5 in (1.96 m)
- Listed weight: 285 lb (129 kg)

Career information
- High school: Albemarle
- College: East Mississippi CC (2010–2011); Mississippi State (2012–2013)
- NFL draft: 2014: undrafted

Career history
- Oakland Raiders (2014–2017); Indianapolis Colts (2018–2020); Tennessee Titans (2021–2023); Houston Texans (2024–2025)

Career NFL statistics as of 2025
- Total tackles: 331
- Sacks: 65.5
- Forced fumbles: 8
- Fumble recoveries: 3
- Pass deflections: 35
- Stats at Pro Football Reference

Denico Autry (born July 15, 1990) is an American former professional football player who was a defensive end in the National Football League (NFL). He played college football at East Mississippi Community College and for the Mississippi State Bulldogs. He was signed as an undrafted free agent by the Oakland Raiders in 2014. In 2026, he took the head coaching job at Albemarle High School.

== Early life ==
Autry played high school football for the Albemarle High School Bulldogs of Albemarle, North Carolina. He finished his senior season with 104 solo tackles, 38 assists, 9.0 sacks, five forced fumbles and four fumble recoveries. He was named the All-SNAP Defensive Player of the Year, as well as the Rocky River Conference Defensive Player of the Year and played in the NCCA East-West All-Star game.

== College career ==
Autry first played college football for the East Mississippi Lions of East Mississippi Community College, helping lead the Lions to a 12–0 record, state championship and NJCAA national title. He was named 2011 NJCAA Football All-America First-team.

He transferred to Mississippi State University to play for the Bulldogs from 2012 to 2013. Autry played in 26 games, starting 23. He recorded 73 total tackles, 16 tackles for loss, six sacks and three forced fumbles in his two-year career.

== Professional career ==
Pre-draft measurables
Height	Weight	Arm length	Hand span	Wingspan	40-yard dash	10-yard split	20-yard split	20-yard shuttle	Three-cone drill	Vertical jump	Broad jump	Bench press
6 ft 4 3/4 in (1.95 m)	273 lb (124 kg)	34 5/8 in (0.88 m)	11 3/8 in (0.29 m)	7 ft 0 in (2.13 m)	5.07 s	1.75 s	2.87 s	4.42 s	7.37 s	29.5 in (0.75 m)	9 ft 7 in (2.92 m)	14 reps
All values from Pro Day

=== Oakland Raiders ===
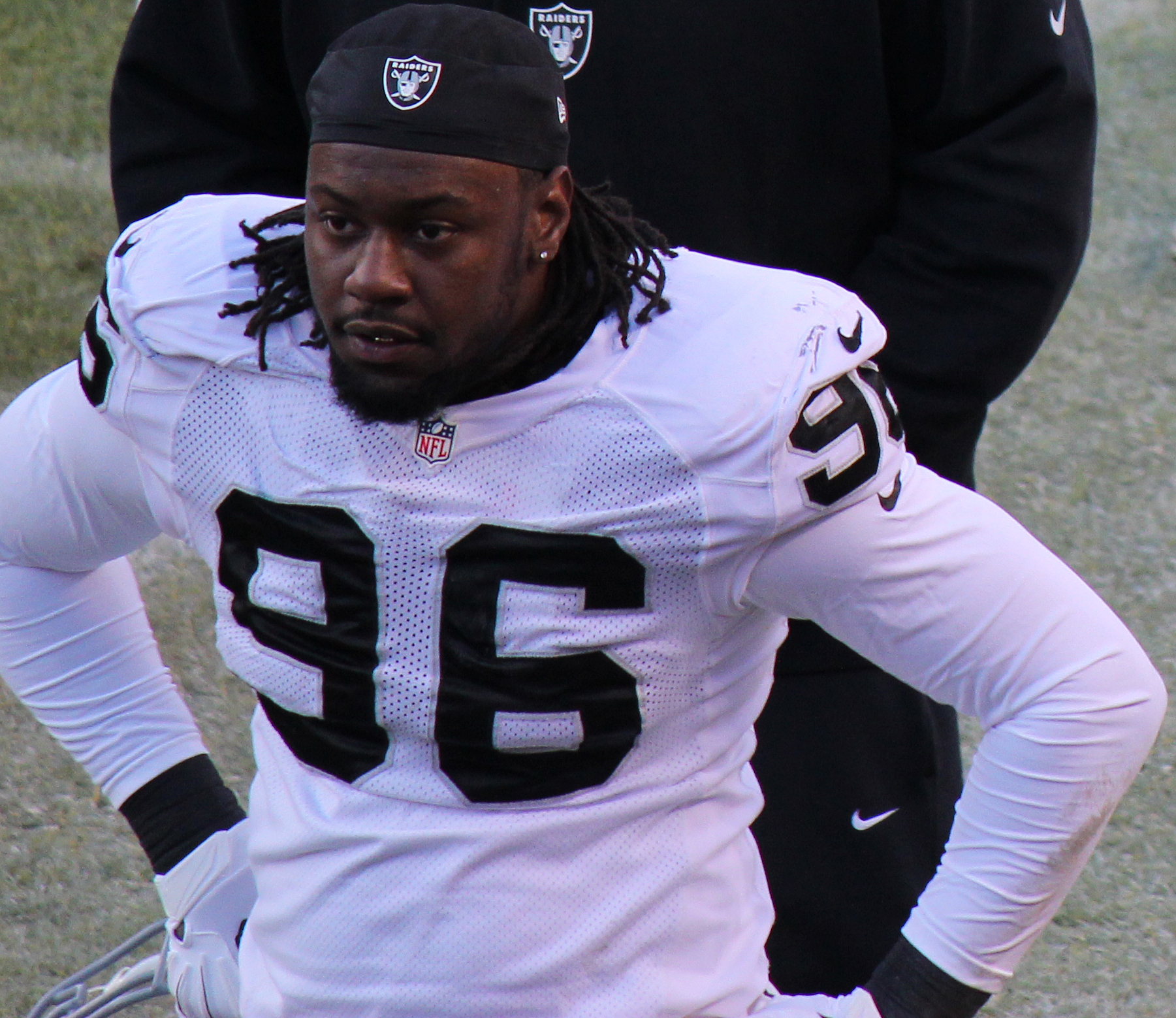
Autry with the Raiders in 2014

Autry was signed by the Oakland Raiders of the NFL on May 20, 2014, after going undrafted in the 2014 NFL draft. He made his NFL debut on October 2, 2014, against the Cleveland Browns, recording two tackles. He played in ten games for the Raiders in 2014, accumulating thirteen combined tackles.

Autry played in fourteen games, starting eight, for the team during the 2015 season, totaling 22 combined tackles, three sacks, three passes deflections and one safety.

The Raiders offered him a one-year exclusive rights tender on March 9, 2016, which Autry eventually signed.

Autry was offered a restricted free agent tender after the conclusion of the 2017 season. He officially signed his tender on April 17, 2017.

=== Indianapolis Colts ===
On March 14, 2018, Autry signed a three-year, $17.8 million contract with the Indianapolis Colts. In Week 14, Autry recorded three sacks and two forced fumbles in a 6–0 loss to the Jacksonville Jaguars. He followed that performance week two, with a pair of sacks in a 24–21 upset win over the Houston Texans, earning him AFC Defensive Player of the Week.

Autry finished the 2019 season with 32 tackles, 3.5 sacks, and a forced fumble in 14 games played. Autry sat out the last two games of the season after suffering a concussion in Week 15 of the season.

Autry made his return from injury in Week 1 against the Jacksonville Jaguars. During the game, Autry recorded his first two sacks of the season on Gardner Minshew in the 27–20 loss. In Week 8 against the Detroit Lions, Autry recorded two sacks on Matthew Stafford during the 41–21 win. Autry was placed on the reserve/COVID-19 list by the team on November 20, 2020, and activated on December 3.

In the Wild Card Round of the playoffs against the Buffalo Bills, Autry sacked Josh Allen 1.5 times and forced a fumble during the 27–24 loss.

=== Tennessee Titans ===
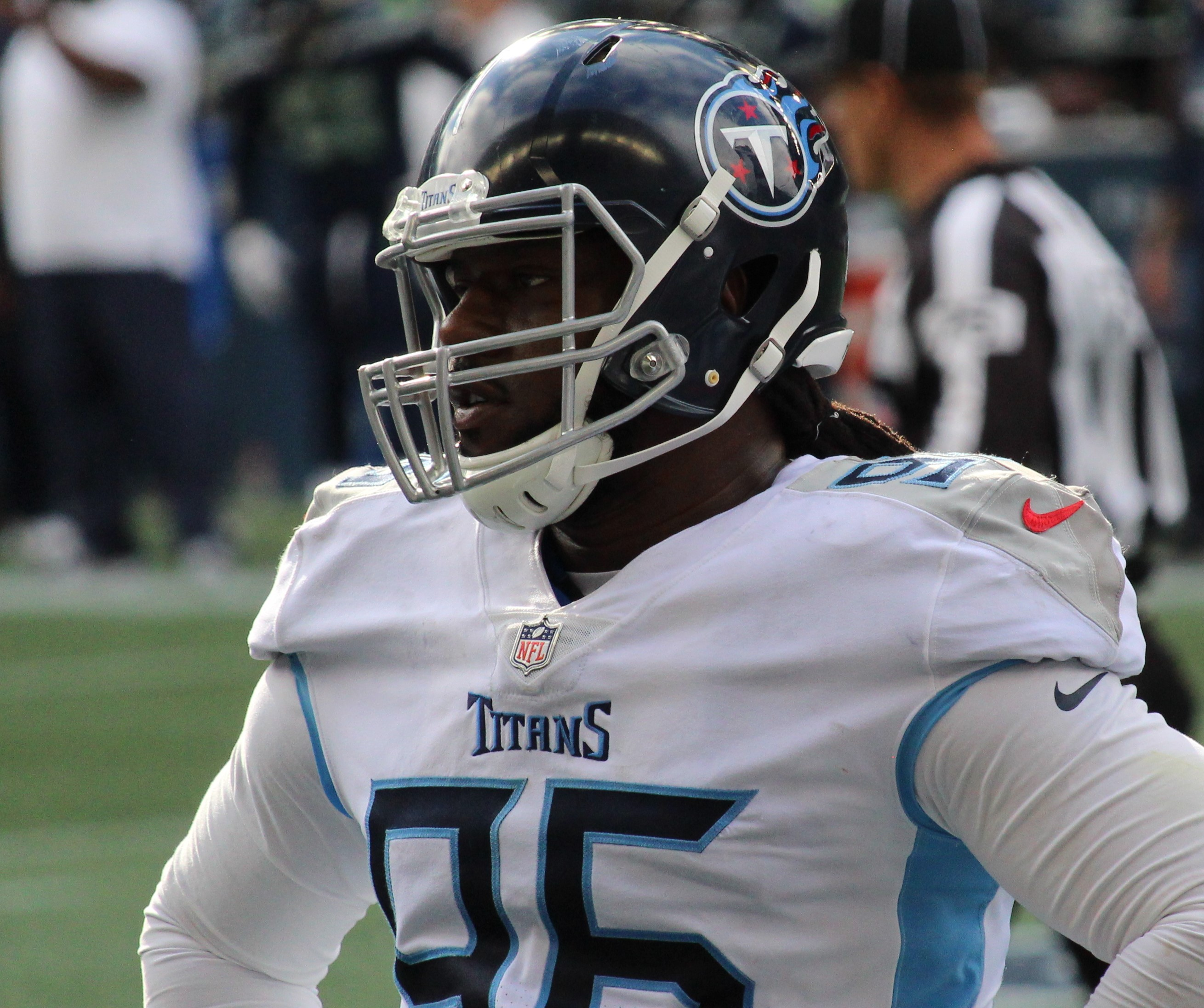
Autry with the Titans in 2021

On March 18, 2021, Autry signed a three-year, $21.5 million deal with the Tennessee Titans.

In 2023, Autry set a career-high and team-leading 11.5 sacks, 50 tackles, and two forced fumbles.

=== Houston Texans ===
On March 15, 2024, Autry signed a two-year contract with the Houston Texans. On July 29, Autry was suspended six games for violating the NFL's performance–enhancing drug policy. Upon returning, he made 10 appearances (two starts) for the team, recording three sacks and 13 combined tackles.

Autry began the 2025 season on the PUP list due to a knee injury. He was activated for his season debut on October 20, 2025.

Autry's Texans contract expired after the 2025 season. In July 2026, it was reported that he was expected to retire.

== Career statistics ==
=== NFL ===
Regular season
Year	Team	Games		Tackles					Interceptions						Fumbles			
Year	Team	GP	GS	Cmb	Solo	Ast	Sck	Loss	PD	Int	Yds	Avg	Lng	TD	FF	FR	Yds	TD
2014	OAK	10	0	13	9	4	0.0	3	0	0	0	0.0	0	0	0	0	0	0
2015	OAK	14	8	22	20	2	3.0	6	3	0	0	0.0	0	0	0	0	0	0
2016	OAK	16	7	29	21	8	2.5	6	2	0	0	0.0	0	0	0	2	0	0
2017	OAK	16	3	36	23	13	5.0	9	7	0	0	0.0	0	0	0	0	0	0
2018	IND	12	11	37	28	9	9.0	13	1	0	0	0.0	0	0	2	1	0	0
2019	IND	14	14	32	20	12	3.5	4	4	0	0	0.0	0	0	1	0	0	0
2020	IND	14	13	33	20	13	7.5	9	0	0	0	0.0	0	0	0	0	0	0
2021	TEN	17	11	31	25	6	9.0	10	6	0	0	0.0	0	0	0	0	0	0
2022	TEN	12	8	27	17	10	8.0	8	4	0	0	0.0	0	0	2	0	0	0
2023	TEN	17	14	50	30	20	11.5	12	4	0	0	0.0	0	0	2	0	0	0
2024	HOU	10	2	13	8	5	3.0	1	3	0	0	0.0	0	0	0	0	0	0
2025	HOU	12	0	8	5	3	3.5	3	1	0	0	0.0	0	0	1	0	0	0
Career		154	89	331	226	105	65.5	83	35	0	0	0.0	0	0	8	3	0	0

Playoffs
Year	Team	Games		Tackles					Interceptions						Fumbles			
Year	Team	GP	GS	Cmb	Solo	Ast	Sck	Loss	PD	Int	Yds	Avg	Lng	TD	FF	FR	Yds	TD
2016	OAK	1	0	4	4	0	0.0	2	1	0	0	0.0	0	0	0	0	0	0
2018	IND	2	2	4	2	2	1.0	2	0	0	0	0.0	0	0	0	0	0	0
2020	IND	1	1	4	2	2	1.5	1	0	0	0	0.0	0	0	1	0	0	0
2021	TEN	1	1	3	1	2	1.5	1	1	0	0	0.0	0	0	0	0	0	0
2024	HOU	1	1	1	1	1	1.0	1	0	0	0	0.0	0	0	0	0	0	0
2025	HOU	2	0	1	0	1	0.5	0	2	0	0	0.0	0	0	0	0	0	0
Career		7	4	17	10	8	5.5	6	2	0	0	0.0	0	0	1	0	0	0

=== College ===
Year	Team	Class	Position	GP	Tackles					Interceptions					Fumbles			
Year	Team	Class	Position	GP	Solo	Ast	Total	Loss	Sack	Int	Yards	Avg	TD	PD	FR	Yards	TD	FF
2012	Mississippi State	Junior	DE	13	28	14	42	9.5	4.0	1	27	27.0	0	0	0	0	0	0
2013	Mississippi State	Senior	DE	12	14	17	31	6.6	2.0	0	0	0.0	0	3	0	0	0	1
