= South Carolina Highway 742 =

State highway in South Carolina, United States

South Carolina Highway 742

Route information
- Maintained by SCDOT
- Length: 3.510 mi (5.649 km)
- Existed: 1942–present

Major junctions
- South end: SC 145 near Chesterfield
- North end: NC 742 at the North Carolina state line near Chesterfield

Location
- Country: United States
- State: South Carolina
- Counties: Chesterfield

Highway system
- South Carolina State Highway System; Interstate; US; State; Scenic
| ← SC 707 | → SC 760 |

South Carolina Highway 742 (SC 742) is a 3.510-mile (5.649 km) primary state highway in the U.S. state of South Carolina. It connects Chesterfield with Wadesboro, North Carolina.

== Route description ==
SC 742 is a two-lane rural highway that traverses from SC 145, near Chesterfield, to the North Carolina state line. The road continues into North Carolina as North Carolina Highway 742 (NC 742) towards Wadesboro.

== History ==
It was established in 1942 as a renumbering of SC 850 and to match NC 742, little has changed since. SC 850 was established in 1940 as a new primary routing from SC 85 to the North Carolina state line.

== Major intersections ==
The entire route is in Chesterfield County.

| Location | mi | km | Destinations | Notes |
|---|---|---|---|---|
| | 0.000 | 0.000 | SC 145 – Chesterfield, Morven | Southern terminus |
| | 3.510 | 5.649 | NC 742 north – Wadesboro | Continuation into North Carolina |
1.000 mi = 1.609 km; 1.000 km = 0.621 mi
