= Linwood Female College =

Linwood Female College was an American women's college associated with the Associate Reformed Presbyterian Church (ARP). It was located at the foot of Crowders Mountain, near Gastonia, North Carolina. The school was also known as Jones' Seminary in its early years, and as Linwood College in its last years. The school was in operation from 1884 to 1921.

== History ==
Around 1884, Emily Prudden of Connecticut founded a school for white girls at the former site of All Healing Springs, a popular mineral springs resort. The former resort's grounds were also briefly used for an industrial school after the American Civil War. Prudden's school soon became the ARP-associated Jones Seminary, with the financial backing of Edwin S. Jones, a judge in Minneapolis, Minnesota. Cyrus Hampton ran the school from 1889 to 1898; the school closed for a year when Hampton retired for health reasons, but re-opened in the fall of 1900 with A. G. Kirkpatrick as its president.

After the retirement of college president A. G. Kirkpatrick, the college was taken over by Archie Thompson Lindsay, a local ARP minister, and his brother, Ernest Lindsay. A year later, the Lindsays asked the student body to propose a new name for the college since it was no longer under the ownership of Judge Jones, and the all-female student body put together the name "Linwood" by honoring the president and the wooded area surrounding the school. The school had a campus of 325 acres near Crowders Mountain.

The college operated as Linwood Female College from 1904 until 1915, when it became a coeducational school in an attempt to improve its financial situation. The name was then shortened to Linwood College. The college closed due to financial difficulties in 1921.

== Faculty and alumni ==
A. T. Lindsay announced that the 1907 faculty of Linwood Female College would include Frances Wideman as Lady Principal, with teachers Phronia Falls, Nell Orr, Bessie Boyce, Mary Copenhaver, Lucy Wallace, and Eleanor Gourdin, and Sallie Holland as one of the matrons. Eunice Riggins was selected Lady Principal of Linwood College in 1916.

Two notable alumni of Linwood were Ben Elbert Douglas Sr., who served as mayor of Charlotte, and Mary Beth Rowan Friday, mother of University of North Carolina system president William C. Friday.

== Legacy ==
In 1931, the Greek Orthodox Church of America bought the old Linwood College campus, with plans to open a new college there. The school's site, now only a few building foundations, is within the boundaries of Crowders Mountain State Park.

== See also ==
- List of current and historical women's universities and colleges
