= Big Lick, North Carolina =

- Unincorporated community
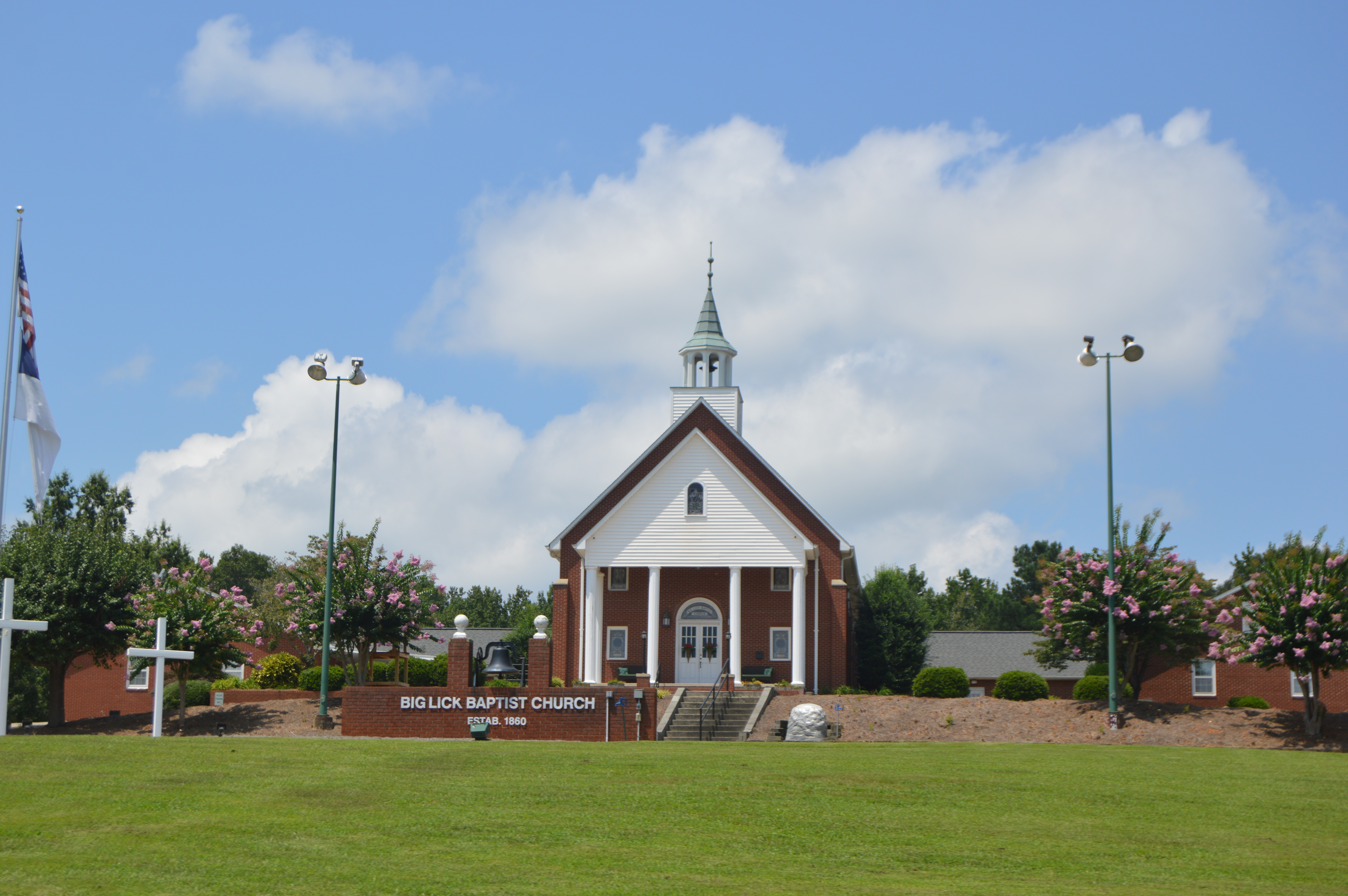
- Big Lick Baptist Church
- Interactive map of Big Lick, North Carolina
- Coordinates: 35.242°N 80.344°W
- Country: United States
- State: North Carolina
- County: Stanly
- Elevation: 561 ft (171 m)
- Time zone: UTC-5 (Eastern (EST))
  - Summer (DST): UTC-4 (EDT)
- ZIP code: 28129
- Area code: 704
- FIPS code: 1019154

Big Lick is an unincorporated community in Stanly County, North Carolina, United States.

== Geography ==
Big Lick is located at latitude 35.242 and longitude -80.344. The elevation is 561 feet.

== History ==
Early settlers observed deer trails that all went to the same destination. When they investigated, they found that deer licked the ground. It turned out there were several salt licks in the area, but this was the big one and was referred to as "Big Lick". A store became a place to meet, and the community had a post office by 1860. The town, officially named Big Lick, was founded and named by Camden Johnson on October 9, 1860.
