= The Weekly Post =

- The Weekly Post front page
- Type: Weekly newspaper
- Owner(s): The Weekly Post, Inc
- Editor: Laura Long
- Language: English
- Headquarters: 212 E. Main Street, Locust, North Carolina United States
- Website: weeklypostnc.com

The Weekly Post is a weekly newspaper based in Locust, North Carolina covering Stanly County and southern Cabarrus County. The newspaper is owned by The Weekly Post, Inc. The paper was established in 1974 by its editor and publisher John Long. Long died in 2003.
