= Emily Prudden =

American educator (1832–1917)

- Born: June 13, 1832; Orange, Connecticut, U.S.
- Died: December 25, 1917 (age 85); Hickory, North Carolina, U.S.
- Occupation: Educator

Emily Catherine Prudden (June 13, 1832 – December 25, 1917) was an American educator and home missionary, credited with founding at least fifteen schools in rural North Carolina and South Carolina, including Linwood Female College and Pfeiffer College.

== Early life ==
Prudden was born in Orange, Connecticut, the daughter of Joseph Prudden and Charlotte Heminway Prudden. Her father was a farmer who was active in Congregational Church work.

== Career ==
Prudden left Connecticut in 1878, to work at Berea College in Berea, Kentucky. She was house mother at Brainerd Institute in Chester, South Carolina in 1882. After those schoolwork experiences, she founded more than a dozen schools in North and South Carolina, mostly for young women, serving both white and Black students. Though the schools were racially segregated, she faced some local opposition to her work. After she started schools, she arranged for the American Missionary Association or other Protestant religious organizations to assume responsibility for their ongoing operation. She retired from school work in 1909.

== Schools founded by Prudden ==
All of the schools founded by Prudden were in rural western North Carolina and South Carolina. Many were staffed by Northern women teachers, sponsored by religious or missionary organizations, and offered community services such as clothing and food distribution, in addition to educational programs.

- Linwood Female College, Gaston County
- Oberlin Home and School, near Hudson; became Pfeiffer University
- Skyland Institute, Blowing Rock
- Lincoln Academy, Kings Mountain
- Prudden School, Avery County
- Elk Park Academy, Avery County
- Mount Herman Academy, Saluda
- Saluda Seminary, Saluda

== Personal life and legacy ==
Prudden was deaf from the age of 17, and had arthritis. She raised her sister's children in Connecticut and edited a Christian periodical before beginning her career as an educator in her late forties. She died in 1917, at the age of 85, in Hickory, North Carolina.

Since 1966, Pfeiffer University has held an annual Emily Prudden Lecture, featuring "outstanding and recognized women who have achieved distinction in some area of professional life or public service and who make a distinctive contribution to the college community". Pfeiffer College's centennial monument, dedicated in 1984, is a tribute to Prudden. In 1991, a historical marker was placed in Blowing Rock, about her work. In 1996, Pfeiffer dedicated a statue of Prudden on campus. In 2013, an outdoor drama about Prudden, named The Legacy of Lick Mountain, was produced in Saluda, North Carolina.
