= Millingport, North Carolina =

- Unincorporated community
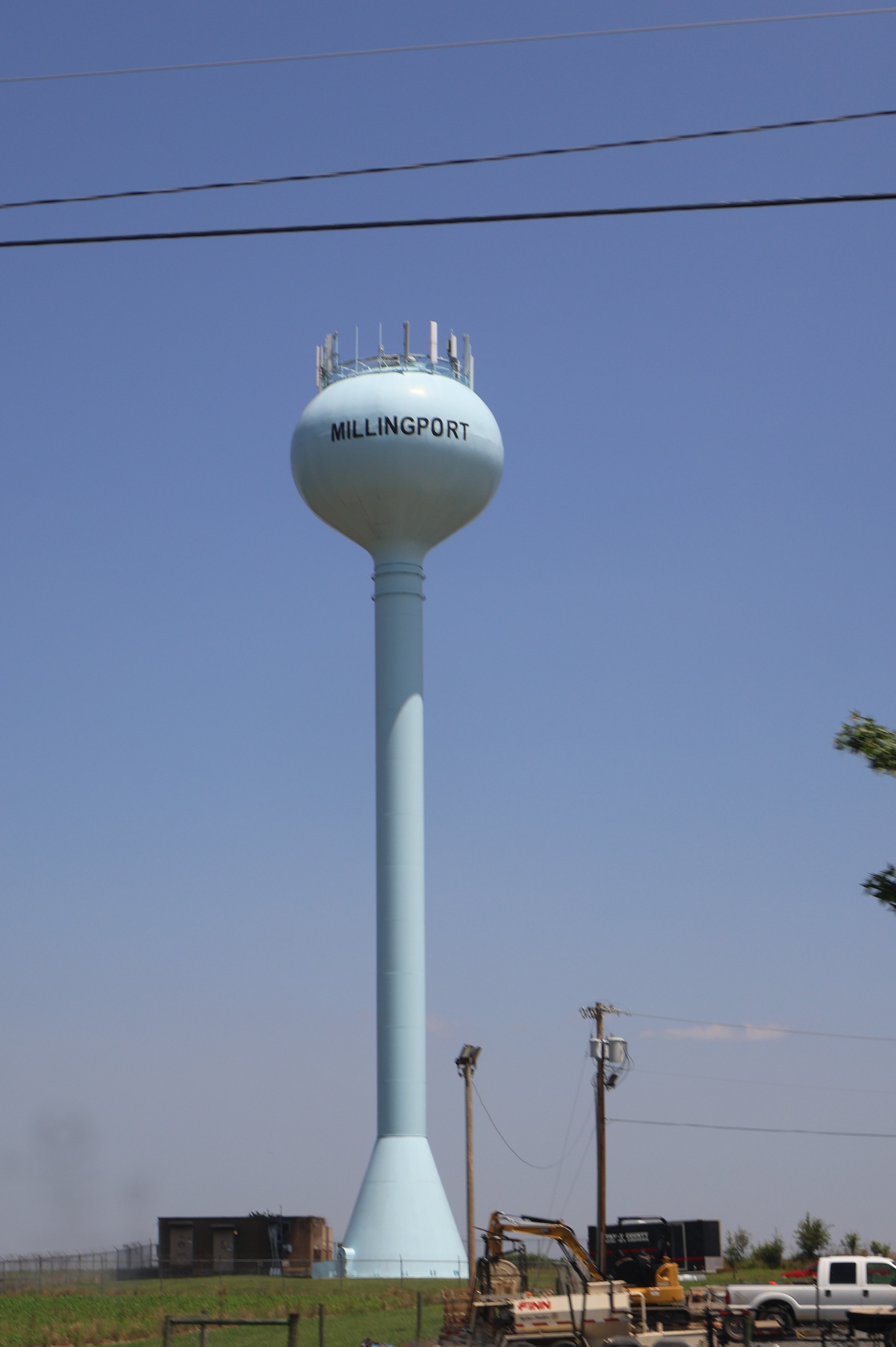
- The Millingport Water Tower as seen from NC 73.

- Location within North Carolina Location within the United States
- Coordinates: 35°22′51″N 80°18′18″W
- Country: United States
- State: North Carolina
- County: Stanly

Area
  - Total: 5.68 sq mi (14.72 km^{2})
  - Land: 5.68 sq mi (14.72 km^{2})
  - Water: 0 sq mi (0.00 km^{2})
- Elevation: 653 ft (199 m)

Population (2020)
  - Total: 588
  - Density: 103.5/sq mi (39.96/km^{2})
- Time zone: UTC-5 (Eastern (EST))
  - Summer (DST): UTC-4 (EDT)
- Area code: 704
- GNIS feature ID: 990015

Millingport is an unincorporated community and census-designated place in Stanly County, North Carolina, United States. As of the 2020 census, Millingport had a population of 588. North Carolina Highway 73 passes through the community.

== Geography ==
According to the U.S. Census Bureau, the community has an area of 5.682 square miles (14.72 km^{2}), all land.

== Demographics ==
Historical population
Census	Pop.	Note	%±
2020	588		—
U.S. Decennial Census
