= Endy Township, Stanly County, North Carolina =

Endy Township
- Township
- Location within North Carolina Location within the United States
- Coordinates: 35°17′47″N 80°16′15″W
- Country: United States
- State: North Carolina
- County: Stanly
- Elevation: 407 ft (124 m)
- Time zone: UTC-5 (Eastern (EST))
  - Summer (DST): UTC-4 (EDT)
- Area code: 704
- GNIS feature ID: 1027194

Endy Township is one of ten townships in Stanly County, North Carolina, United States. In the 2010 census, it had a population of 1,944.
