= B. J. Hill (American football) =

American football player (born 1995)

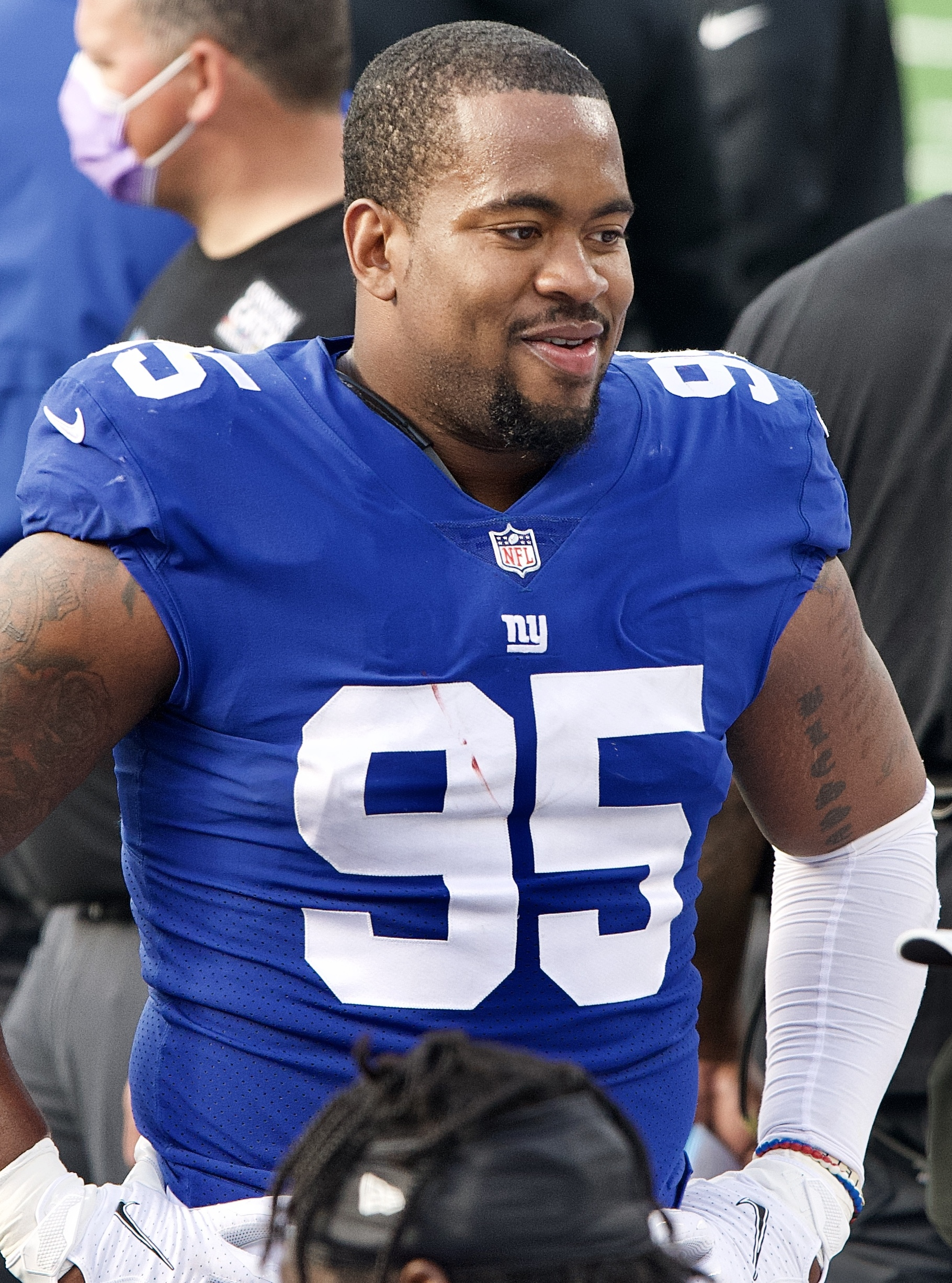
- Hill with the New York Giants in 2020

No. 92 – Cincinnati Bengals
- Position: Defensive tackle
- Roster status: Active

Personal information
- Born: April 20, 1995 (age 31); Oakboro, North Carolina, U.S.
- Listed height: 6 ft 3 in (1.91 m)
- Listed weight: 311 lb (141 kg)

Career information
- High school: West Stanly (Oakboro)
- College: NC State (2014–2017)
- NFL draft: 2018: 3rd round, 69th overall pick

Career history
- New York Giants (2018–2020); Cincinnati Bengals (2021–present)

Career NFL statistics as of 2025
- Total tackles: 407
- Sacks: 27.5
- Forced fumbles: 1
- Fumble recoveries: 4
- Pass deflections: 16
- Interceptions: 2
- Stats at Pro Football Reference

Bobby Gene Hill Jr. (born April 20, 1995) is an American professional football defensive tackle for the Cincinnati Bengals of the National Football League (NFL). He played college football for the NC State Wolfpack and was selected by the New York Giants in the third round of the 2018 NFL draft.

== Early life ==
Along with football, Hill participated in track and field, baseball, and basketball at West Stanly High School. As a senior, Hill recorded nine sacks, an interception, and five rushing touchdowns, playing both defensive end and running back. He was listed as a three-star defensive end recruit by 247Sports.com and committed to NC State on June 12, 2013, to play football, over offers from East Carolina and North Carolina

== College career ==
Hill attended and played college football at NC State from 2014 to 2017. He became a starting defensive tackle midway through his freshman year, and maintained his starting role for his entire college career, playing in 51 games with 44 starts. He ended his career with 187 tackles, nine sacks, two forced fumbles, two fumble recoveries, and 10 pass deflections. He was named Honorable Mention All-ACC for his senior season in 2017, recording 57 tackles, three sacks, and a forced fumble. His success led to him being invited to play in the 2018 Senior Bowl.

=== Statistics ===
Year	School	Conf	Class	Pos	G	Tackles					Interceptions					Fumbles			
Year	School	Conf	Class	Pos	G	Solo	Ast	Tot	Loss	Sk	Int	Yds	Avg	TD	PD	FR	Yds	TD	FF
2014	North Carolina State	ACC	FR	DT	11	19	20	39	6.5	1.5	1	0	0.0	0	1	0			0
2015	North Carolina State	ACC	SO	DT	12	23	27	50	11.0	3.5	0	0		0	3	0			0
2016	North Carolina State	ACC	JR	DT	12	16	23	39	2.5	1.0	0	0		0	2	2			1
2017	North Carolina State	ACC	SR	DT	13	18	37	55	3.5	2.0	0	0		0	3	0			1
Career	North Carolina State					76	107	183	23.5	8.0	1	0	0.0	0	9	2			2

== Professional career ==
=== Pre-draft ===
On December 4, 2017, it was announced that Hill had accepted his invitation to play in the 2018 Senior Bowl. Hill was dominant during Senior Bowl practices and impressed scouts and team representatives. On January 27, 2018, Hill played in the 2018 Reese's Senior Bowl and was part of Denver Broncos' head coach Vance Joseph's North team that lost to the South 45–16. He attended the NFL Scouting Combine in Indianapolis and completed all of the combine and positional drills. Hill's overall performance helped raise his draft stock, as he finished third among all defensive linemen in the bench press, fifth in the three-cone drill, tied for 11th in the 20-yard shuttle, and finished 15th among his position group in the 40-yard dash. On March 19, 2018, Hill participated at NC State's pro day, but opted to stand on his combine numbers and only performed positional drills. Hill also attended a pre-draft visits with the Pittsburgh Steelers and Carolina Panthers. At the conclusion of the pre-draft process, Hill was projected to be a second or third round pick by NFL draft experts and scouts. He was ranked as the fifth best defensive tackle prospect in the draft by Scouts Inc. and was ranked the seventh best defensive tackle by DraftScout.com.

External videos
- B.J. Hill's NFL Combine Workout
- B.J. Hill's NC State Pro Day Interview
- 2018 NFL Draft Profile: B.J. Hill

Pre-draft measurables
Height	Weight	Arm length	Hand span	Wingspan	40-yard dash	10-yard split	20-yard split	20-yard shuttle	Three-cone drill	Vertical jump	Broad jump	Bench press
6 ft 3 1/4 in (1.91 m)	311 lb (141 kg)	33 in (0.84 m)	10 5/8 in (0.27 m)	6 ft 6 1/4 in (1.99 m)	4.99 s	1.74 s	2.88 s	4.53 s	7.28 s	26.5 in (0.67 m)	8 ft 5 in (2.57 m)	35 reps
All values from NFL Combine

=== New York Giants ===
The New York Giants selected Hill in the third round with the 69th overall pick in the 2018 NFL draft. Hill was the fifth defensive tackle drafted in 2018. The pick used to select Hill was acquired from the Tampa Bay Buccaneers in exchange for Jason Pierre-Paul. On June 7, 2018, the Giants signed Hill to a four-year, $4.04 million contract that includes a signing bonus of $1.02 million. In Week 3, against the Houston Texans, he recorded his first career sack. In the next game, a loss to the New Orleans Saints, he recorded his second sack of the season. In Week 13, against the Chicago Bears, he had three sacks in the 30–27 overtime win. He finished the 2018 season with 5.5 sacks, 48 total tackles, and two passes defended.

External videos
- New York Giants draft B.J. Hill 69th overall

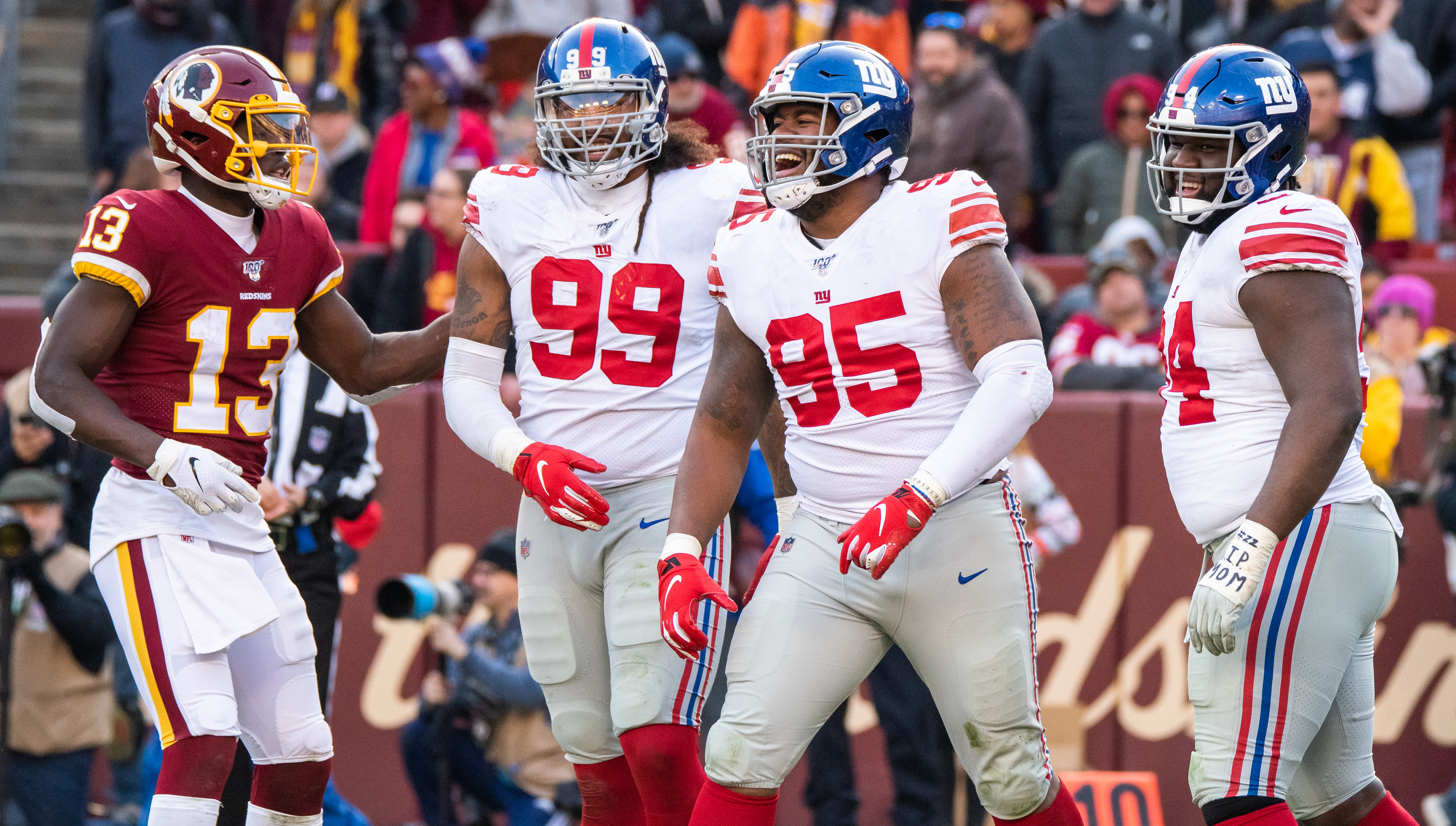
Hill in a game against the Washington Redskins

Hill's statistics dropped in the 2019 season, only recording 36 tackles and one sack.

Hill recorded his first sack of the 2020 season on Mitchell Trubisky in a game against the Chicago Bears in Week 2.

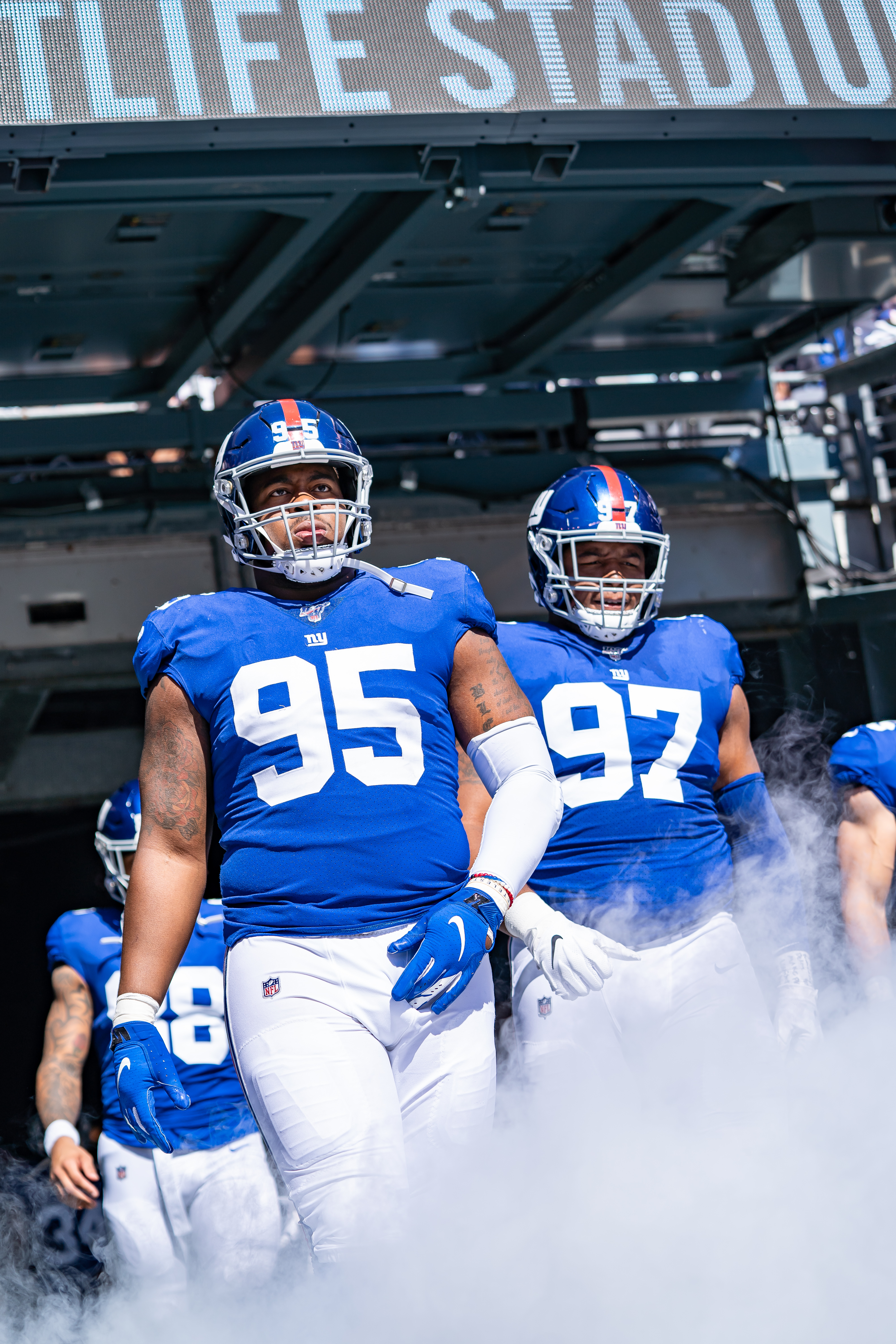
Hill in a game against the Washington Redskins

He finished the 2020 season with one sack, 32 total tackles, and one pass defended.

=== Cincinnati Bengals ===
On August 30, 2021, Hill was traded to the Cincinnati Bengals for center Billy Price. In the 2021 season, he finished with 5.5 sacks and 50 total tackles. In the AFC Championship against the Kansas City Chiefs, he intercepted Patrick Mahomes when the Bengals were down 13–21 with 2:18 remaining in the third quarter, leading to the game-tying touchdown in the eventual 27–24 overtime victory.

On March 15, 2022, Hill signed a three-year, $30 million contract extension with the Bengals. He finished the 2022 season with three sacks, 68 tackles, four passes defended, one forced fumble, and three fumble recoveries. In the 2023 season, Hill finished with 4.5 sacks, 51 total tackles, two interceptions, five passes defended, and one fumble recovery. In the 2024 season, Hill finished with three sacks, 56 tackles, and four passes defended.

On March 12, 2025, Hill signed a three-year, $33 million contract extension with the Bengals. In the 2025 season, Hill finished with four sacks and 66 total tackles.

== NFL career statistics ==
=== Regular season ===
Year	Team	Games		Tackles					Interceptions						Fumbles			
Year	Team	GP	GS	Cmb	Solo	Ast	Sck	TFL	Int	Yds	Avg	Lng	TD	PD	FF	FR	Yds	TD
2018	NYG	16	12	48	32	16	5.5	6	0	0	0.0	0	0	2	0	0	0	0
2019	NYG	16	5	36	15	21	1.0	2	0	0	0.0	0	0	0	0	0	0	0
2020	NYG	16	0	32	15	17	1.0	2	0	0	0.0	0	0	1	0	0	0	0
2021	CIN	16	2	50	29	21	5.5	6	0	0	0.0	0	0	0	0	0	0	0
2022	CIN	16	16	68	30	38	3.0	4	0	0	0.0	0	0	4	1	3	0	0
2023	CIN	17	17	51	26	25	4.5	2	2	0	0.0	0	0	5	0	1	0	0
2024	CIN	15	15	56	25	31	3.0	7	0	0	0.0	0	0	4	0	0	0	0
2025	CIN	17	17	66	29	37	4.0	5	0	0	0.0	0	0	0	0	0	0	0
Career		129	84	407	201	206	27.5	34	2	0	0.0	0	0	16	1	4	0	0

=== Postseason ===
Year	Team	Games		Tackles					Interceptions						Fumbles			
Year	Team	GP	GS	Cmb	Solo	Ast	Sck	TFL	Int	Yds	Avg	Lng	TD	PD	FF	FR	Yds	TD
2021	CIN	4	3	13	6	7	1.5	2	1	3	3.0	3	0	1	0	0	0	0
2022	CIN	3	3	9	4	5	1.0	1	0	0	0.0	0	0	2	0	0	0	0
Career		7	6	22	10	12	2.5	3	1	3	3.0	3	0	3	0	0	0	0
