= Palestine, North Carolina =

- Unincorporated community
- Location within North Carolina Location within the United States
- Coordinates: 35°24′16″N 80°09′51″W
- Country: United States
- State: North Carolina
- County: Stanly
- Elevation: 591 ft (180 m)
- Time zone: UTC-5 (Eastern (EST))
  - Summer (DST): UTC-4 (EDT)
- Area code: 704
- GNIS feature ID: 1021784

Palestine is an unincorporated community in Stanly County, North Carolina, United States.
