= Big Lick Township, Stanly County, North Carolina =

Big Lick Township
- Township
- Location within North Carolina Location within the United States
- Coordinates: 35°15′46″N 80°19′27″W
- Country: United States
- State: North Carolina
- County: Stanly
- Elevation: 492 ft (150 m)
- Time zone: UTC-5 (Eastern (EST))
  - Summer (DST): UTC-4 (EDT)
- Area code: 704
- GNIS feature ID: 1027192

Big Lick Township is one of ten townships in Stanly County, North Carolina, United States. In the 2010 census, it had a population of 5,125.
