= Burnsville, Anson County, North Carolina =

Burnsville, North Carolina
- Unincorporated community
- Location within North Carolina
- Coordinates: 35.112°N 80.245°W
- Country: United States
- State: North Carolina
- County: Anson
- Elevation: 522 ft (159 m)
- Time zone: UTC-5 (EST)
  - Summer (DST): UTC-4 (EDT)
- Area code: 704
- GNIS feature ID: 982292

Burnsville is an unincorporated community in Anson County, North Carolina, United States.

== Geography ==
Burnsville is located at latitude 35.112 and longitude -80.245. The elevation is 522 feet. It is located along North Carolina Highway 742.
