= Misenheimer, North Carolina =

Village North Carolina, United States

Coordinates: 35°29′06″N 80°17′18″W

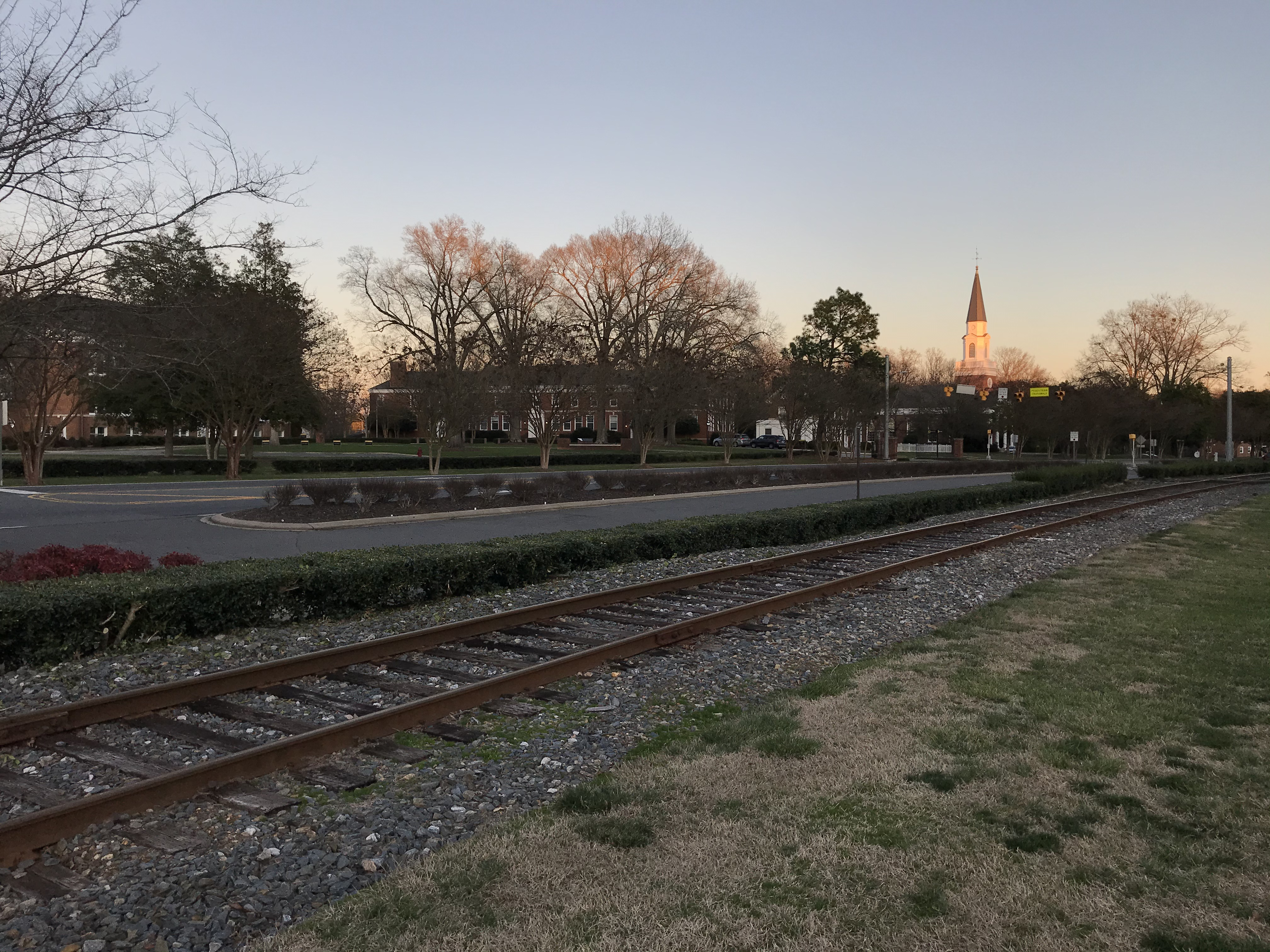
Misenheimer with Pfeiffer University buildings in the background, Norfolk Southern Railroad line in the foreground

Misenheimer is an incorporated village in Stanly County, North Carolina, United States. It is in the southern Piedmont region of North Carolina, near the city of Richfield. As of the 2020 census, Misenheimer had a population of 650.

The college town is dominated by the main campus of Pfeiffer University, a university which was upgraded from a high school to a college largely due to financial support by Henry and Annie Merner Pfeiffer. Pfeiffer also housed Gray Stone Day School, a charter high school. On January 6, 2011, Gray Stone moved to its new campus on what was previously Pfeiffer land in the town.

U.S. Route 52 passes through Misenheimer along its route from Salisbury to Albemarle, and bisects the Pfeiffer campus along with a Norfolk Southern Railroad line. Misenheimer may have been the only municipality in America whose only traffic light is not at an intersection of two or more streets, but at a crosswalk to accommodate pedestrian traffic (the crosswalk being across US 52 connecting the two parts of Pfeiffer's campus on opposite sides of the highway).

== History ==
In 1825, Matthias Tobias Barringer discovered gold nuggets along a section of Long Creek that ran through his farm. He found $8,000 worth of gold ($179,000 in 2020 dollars), and eventually the country's first gold vein in quartz. Newspapers in 24 states reported the find, and North Carolina's gold rush began. Meanwhile, Barringer was sued because of uncertainty over whether he owned the land he mined; he won the case in the 1880s. By 1888, new owners were working the mine and they moved Long Creek. In 1903, the Whitney Company, which was also working on damming the Yadkin River, bought the mine. Workers removed six tons of ore worth $20,000 per ton ($640,000 in 2020) and much more was still available. The gold financed the Yadkin River project. However, on August 11, 1904, a flood caused the deaths of eight men in the mine, and it eventually shut down, not to reopen until 1998.

In the late 1800s Misenheimer was a stop called Gladstone on a railroad spur that served a nearby early tourist destination, Misenheimer Springs.

Incorporation resulted June 26, 2003, from a bill passed by the North Carolina General Assembly. A major reason for the action was the planned widening of U.S. 52 and N.C. 49, expected to bring growth to the area. One of the first actions taken by the interim board was to block heavy industry such as re-opening the former Barringer gold mine by Joe Carter, who owned about 250 acres, or about a fourth of the village land, but did not live in the community. Carter had been working to restart the mine since 1998, and county commissioners stopped his plan for a quarry after residents protested, but Peter Edquist, a leader of the incorporation effort and the first mayor, denied that the mine was the reason for incorporation.

== Government ==
Misenheimer has a mayor-council government with five total council members serving staggered four-year terms. The council elects one of its own members as the mayor every two years, and may remove and replace the mayor as well. This system prevents the direct general election of a mayor by the citizens of the town. Members are elected at-large (without districts) and in a non-partisan manner. The local legislation creating the city specified that elections were to be held in even-numbered years, while the rest of the state always uses odd-numbered ones.

== Demographics ==
Historical population
| Census | Pop. | Note | %± |
|---|---|---|---|
| 2010 | 728 | | — |
| 2020 | 650 | | −10.7% |
U.S. Decennial Census

=== 2020 census ===
Misenheimer racial composition
| Race | Number | Percentage |
|---|---|---|
| White (non-Hispanic) | 425 | 65.38% |
| Black or African American (non-Hispanic) | 140 | 21.54% |
| Native American | 4 | 0.62% |
| Asian | 8 | 1.23% |
| Other/Mixed | 26 | 4.0% |
| Hispanic or Latino | 47 | 7.23% |

As of the 2020 United States census, there were 650 people, 111 households, and 62 families residing in the village.
