= Central Elementary School (Albemarle, North Carolina) =

Historic school in North Carolina, US

- Albemarle Graded School
- U.S. National Register of Historic Places
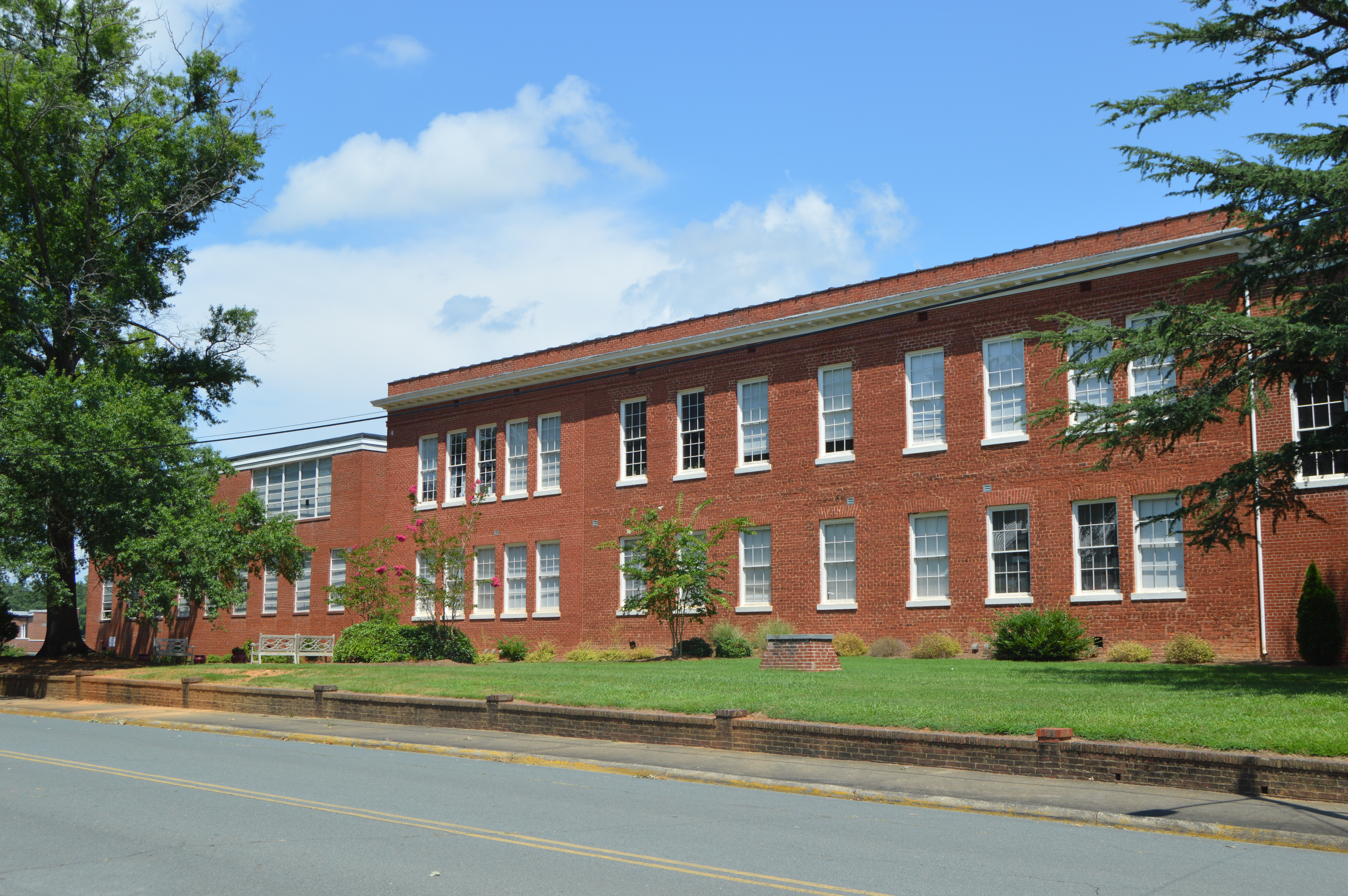
- Western side

- Location within North Carolina
- Location: E. North Street, Albemarle, North Carolina
- Coordinates: 35.3523°N 80.1959°W
- NRHP reference No.: 14000991

Central Elementary School is a historic school in Albemarle, North Carolina whose current main building opened in 1925 as Albemarle High School, and whose previous building (Albemarle Graded School) located next door was named to the National Register of Historic Places in 2015. Additions to the 1925 building were constructed in 1936 and a renovation and expansion completed in 2007. When the renovation was completed, Central Elementary moved from its original building next door. The renovation resulted in the Stanly County's school board being honored by Preservation North Carolina in 2008. The school has 561 students in grades pre-kindergarten to 5th grade and is SACS-accredited.

== History of the original building ==
The original Central School (previously Albemarle Graded School) was built in 1900 at North Third Street and East North Street on the site of another building built in 1875. The school burned November 18, 1920 but was renovated and expanded.

When a new high school opened in 1925 next door, the older building became Central Elementary School. Additions were made in 1952 and 1965. While the main entrance had faced North Street, the 1965 addition included a new entrance on Third Street.

By 1990, the oldest building needed replacing. A new building next door was considered, but the decision was made to renovate and add to the Albemarle Middle School building already on that site. The old Central School building was empty after students were moved to the renovated building next door in 2007. One proposal in 2009 was housing for the elderly, with the auditorium converted for cultural activities. As of 2011, the oldest section was still standing. The building and the 2-acre property was for sale. In December 2013, after several offers, the Stanly County School Board voted to sell the old building to the city for $150,000.

The old Central School buildings are part of a downtown revitalization project funded partly by tax credits for historic preservation of the school buildings. The Albemarle Graded School/Central Elementary buildings were named to the National Register of Historic Places in 2015.

Albemarle Central School Apartments, intended for people over 55 meeting income requirements, opened in August 2016.

== History, expansion and renovation of the 1925 building ==
Charles C. Hook designed Albemarle High School. The design included "carved Indian-influenced geometric limestone patterns." The new building was described as "one of the handsomest structures in the city ... built of the best grade of brick ... three stories and ... practically fireproof." It was opened in the fall of 1925.

A gym completed in 1936 was considered "one of the most modern structures of its type in North Carolina high schools."

A football stadium with 2300 permanent seats and 700 temporary bleachers opened in 1947.

A new high school was built on Palestine Road in 1958, and the old high school building became Albemarle Junior High School. A stadium was added to the new location in 1978.

Albemarle Junior High became Albemarle Middle School in 1985.

A 2000 bond referendum called for the 1925 building to be demolished, but a number of people in the community wanted the historic building preserved. Stanly County Museum director Christine Dwyer said, "It's a very important kind of architecture because it's so rare." The Collegiate Gothic building was described as "a reinvention of the Gothic art of the Middle Ages" which included "carved limestone and battlements across the front."

The National Institute of Historic Preservation offered financial help. To see schools that were "good as new", officials visited C.G. Credle Elementary School in Oxford, North Carolina and Watts Elementary in Durham, North Carolina. The schools did have problems but those were mainly in the newer sections. In December 2002, the Stanly County School Board voted to preserve the 1925 building. Two of the 1936 additions would also be kept—the gymnasium and a section next to the football field.

A 2-story building with a new cafeteria was planned on the site of the other 1936 addition. Students were expected to move in by Fall 2004 and the construction costs were anticipated at $6.8 to $7.3 million. The $7.9 million cost of the project was $1.2 million more than expected. Work began in October 2003 and students were to move in by January 2005. The existing building was designed to look the same on the outside with a mostly new interior and a 25,000-square-foot addition. The addition was later increased to 37,000 square feet, with an exterior appearance matching the 1925 building.

With a new middle school building completed on Badin Road in 2003, the former middle school building was expected to house 500 students, with larger classrooms than many schools had, and kindergarten and first-grade students would have classes on the first floor. The load-bearing walls were five bricks thick, and bricks were solid, rather than the newer type with three holes. Architect Steve Onxley, who worked on the new project, said, "[T]his building was years ahead of most of the buildings of its time." School buildings tended to be well built because of the value of a high school education at the time, equivalent to a junior college years later. The former auditorium, used as a library, was found to have heart pine floors, which were to be kept. The 1936 gymnasium had maple floors which would be refinished, and glass block windows were to be added. Plaster moldings were still able to be used. No structural cracks were found in the 1925 building, despite the lack of expansion joints. Onxley said the gym "has all the look of a modern movement with simplified precast concrete detailing to match the carved limestone."

The project ran into numerous delays. A contractor went bankrupt, lead and asbestos were bigger problems than expected, and steel beams in the new section were bent. The target date was August 2006. Then a slab between the old and new sections had problems. Work stopped until a new contractor could be found. The project resumed in October 2006. The cost had increased to between $11 and $12 million. The basement of the old school had been removed and the third floor of the 1925 building was left for future expansion. The stage and balcony of the 1924 auditorium were restored, and original brickwork that had not been visible can now be seen, showing the skill of those who built it. Students moved into the new 99,433-square-foot Central Elementary on November 13, 2007.

In 2008, Preservation North Carolina honored the Stanly County School Board with its Carraway Award of Merit.
