= Aquadale, North Carolina =

- Unincorporated community
- Location within North Carolina Location within the United States
- Coordinates: 35°13′28″N 80°13′25″W
- Country: United States
- State: North Carolina
- County: Stanly

Area
  - Total: 3.25 sq mi (8.43 km^{2})
  - Land: 3.25 sq mi (8.43 km^{2})
  - Water: 0 sq mi (0.00 km^{2})
- Elevation: 459 ft (140 m)

Population (2020)
  - Total: 348
  - Density: 106.9/sq mi (41.28/km^{2})
- Time zone: UTC-5 (Eastern (EST))
  - Summer (DST): UTC-4 (EDT)
- Area code: 704
- GNIS feature ID: 2628610

Aquadale is an unincorporated community and census-designated place in Stanly County, North Carolina, United States. As of the 2020 census, Aquadale had a population of 348.

== Demographics ==
Historical population
Census	Pop.	Note	%±
2020	348		—
U.S. Decennial Census
