= Pfeiffer University =

Private university in Misenheimer, North Carolina, U.S.

- Former names: Oberlin Home and School (1885–1903); Ebenezer Mitchell Home and School (1903–1928); Mitchell Junior College (1928–1935); Pfeiffer Junior College (1935–1954); Pfeiffer College (1954–1996)
- Type: Private university
- Established: 1885; 141 years ago
- Affiliations: USA South (NCAA Division III)
- Religious affiliation: United Methodist Church
- President: Dr. Scott Bullard
- Faculty: 51 full-time
- Students: 1,800
- Location: Misenheimer, North Carolina, United States; 35°29′04″N 80°16′57″W
- Colors: Black and Gold
- Nickname: Falcons
- Mascot: Pfeiffer Falcons (Freddie Falcon)
- Website: pfeiffer.edu
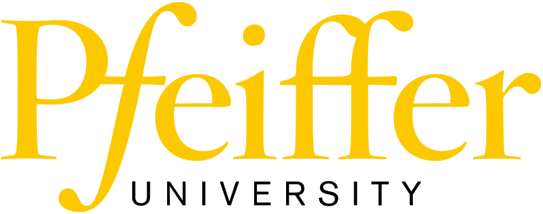
- Pfeiffer Junior College Historic District
- U.S. National Register of Historic Places
- U.S. Historic district
- Area: 14.5 acres (5.9 ha)
- Built: 1923
- Architect: Poundtstone, Odis Clay; Bradshaw, Leonidas Sloan, et al.
- Architectural style: Colonial Revival
- NRHP reference No.: 99000480
- Added to NRHP: April 28, 1999

Pfeiffer University is a private university in Misenheimer, North Carolina, United States. It is affiliated with the United Methodist Church.

== History ==
Pfeiffer originated from a home school operated by Emily Prudden in the late-19th century. The school, called the "Oberlin Home and School", first began on the outskirts of Hudson, North Carolina, on Lick Mountain in Caldwell County, North Carolina. University archivist Jonathan Hutchinson said in 2013, "Our accepted founding date is 1885," referring to the date Prudden's first school began, "but Emily probably started the school in about 1898." The school was called Oberlin, after John Frederick Oberlin, a French priest noted for his social improvement in the Alsace Region of France. The school was later endowed by Mrs. Mary P. Mitchell, and the name was changed to the "Mitchell School".

A fire destroyed the school in 1907 and it moved to the nearby town of Lenoir, North Carolina. As that location proved inadequate, the school again relocated in 1910, this time to its current location in Misenheimer. The Mitchell School began awarding high school diplomas in 1913. In 1928, the school began offering junior college classes, called the "Mitchell Junior College", and was accredited as such in 1934. It was that year that the Pfeiffer family of New York City gave generous financial gifts to the school for construction of new buildings. The following year, the school's name was thus changed to "Pfeiffer Junior College".

During the 1950s the school began offering senior college courses, and the four-year "Pfeiffer College" was fully accredited in 1960 during the administration of Dr. J. Lem Stokes II, President.

Pfeiffer opened a satellite campus in Charlotte, approximately forty miles away, in 1977. The campus moved to a new location in 2017.

In 1996, the college's trustees voted to re-organize to achieve university status, and the current name of "Pfeiffer University" was adopted.

An outdoor drama entitled The Legacy of Lick Mountain relates the story of the beginning of the school, and was presented in Hudson, N.C. in the summer of 2015.

=== Pfeiffer Junior College Historic District ===
The "Pfeiffer Junior College Historic District" is a national historic district encompassing 14 contributing buildings and 1 contributing structure on the campus of Pfeiffer University. They include Georgian Revival-style brick academic buildings erected between 1923 and 1948. Notable buildings include the Administration Building (1923, remodeled in 1936), Rowe Hall (1935), Merner Hall (1935), Goode Hall (1935), "Practice Home" (1941-1942), Cline Hall (1935), President's House (1935), Jane Freeman Hall (1937), Henry Pfeiffer Chapel (1941-1942), Delight and Garfield Merner Center (1941-1942), Washington Hall (1941-1942), Mitchell Gymnasium (1948-1950), and the Campus Gates (1935).

It was added to the National Register of Historic Places in 1999.

== Organization ==
- Division of Business
- Division of Education
- Division of Health-Related Programs
- The Graduate School

== Graduate studies ==
Pfeiffer has three graduate campuses. The graduate campus is located in Charlotte, North Carolina near the SouthPark area. The campus has been in Charlotte since 1996 and currently serves several hundred students. On October 12, 2016, Pfeiffer announced plans to leave its Park Road campus, which it will sell to a developer planning a six-story building with apartments, restaurants, retail and offices. The new location across the street in the Park Seneca building on Mockingbird Lane, with 26,440 square feet (2,456 m^{2}) on three floors, officially opened October 20, 2017.

In November 2016, Albemarle City Council approved incentives for a campus in the city several miles south of the main campus. Graduate programs would be located in a new building at the location of the former Stanly County Museum, which relocated to the City Hall Annex. The Albemarle Hotel was renovated as a result, because students could live there. Groundbreaking took place January 7, 2019. The first classes were held September 17, 2020.

The graduate degrees offered include master's degrees in business administration, healthcare administration, education, organizational change and leadership, and marriage & family therapy, some of which are offered online as well.

== Accreditations ==
Pfeiffer University's Division of Business is a candidate for accreditation from the Accreditation Council for Business Schools and Programs in May 2017.

== Programs ==
=== Music ===
For many years (especially the 1970s), Pfeiffer experienced success as a nationally recognized choral program, mostly under the direction of Dr. Richard Brewer. Later, noteworthy instrumental music programs surfaced under the direction of composer Ed Kiefer and Fulbright Professor Tom Smith.

== Campus ==
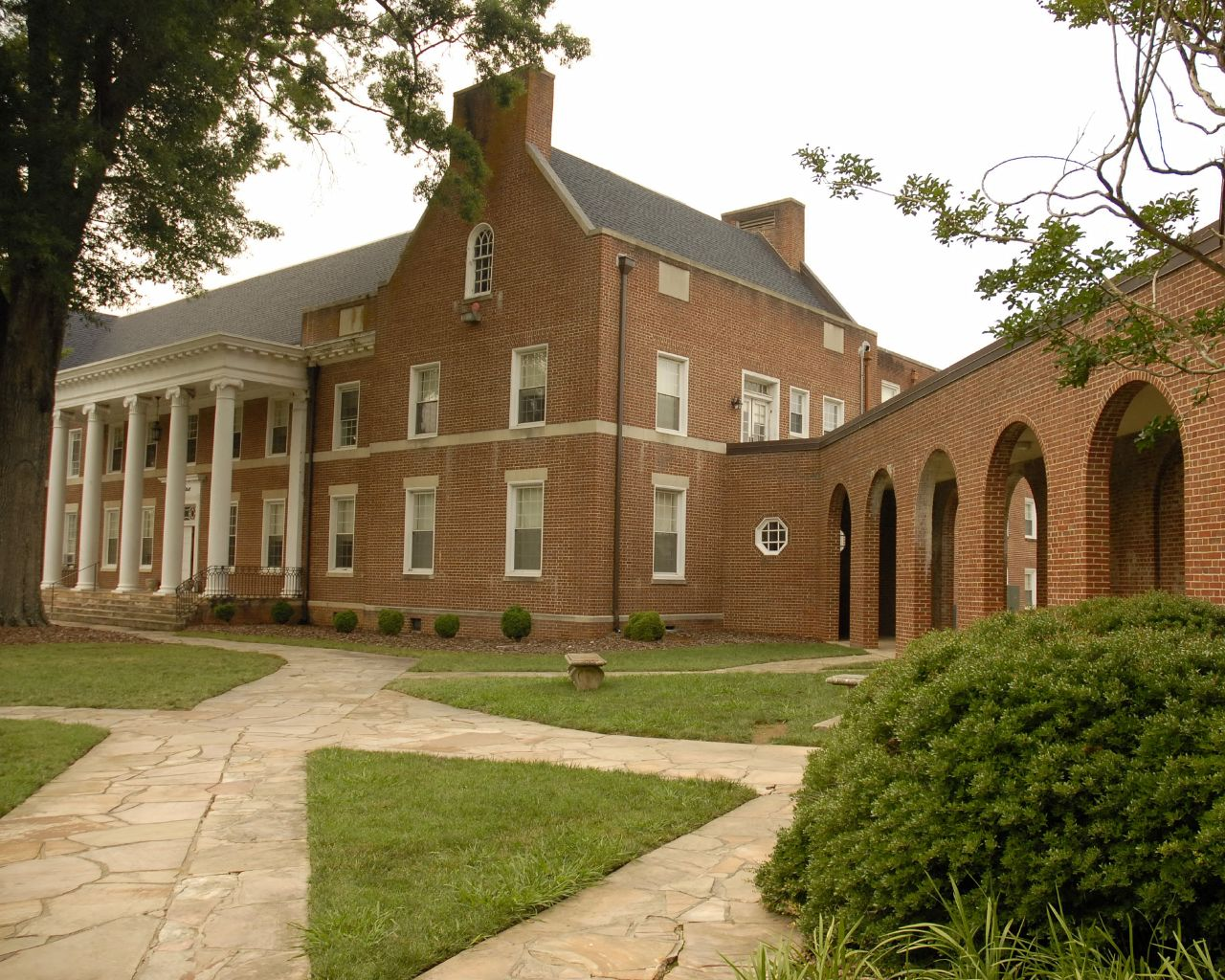
Rowe Hall

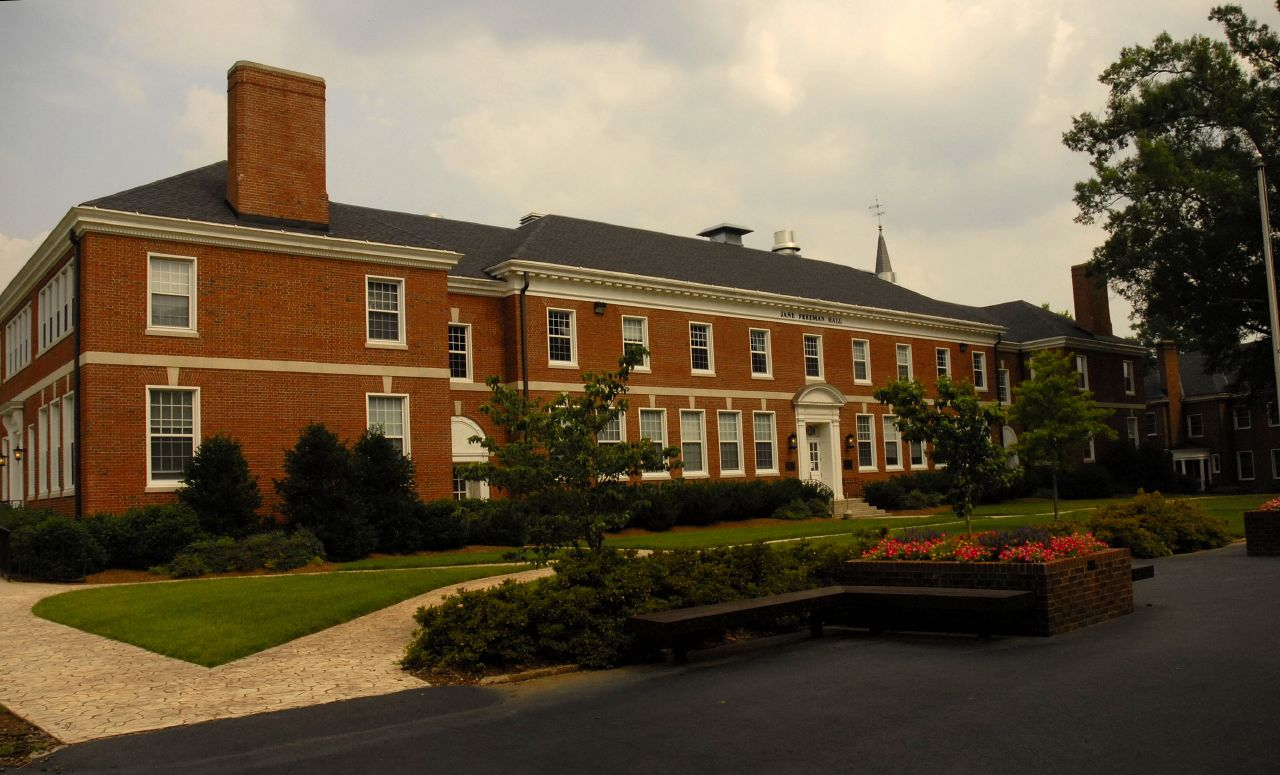
Jane Freeman Hall

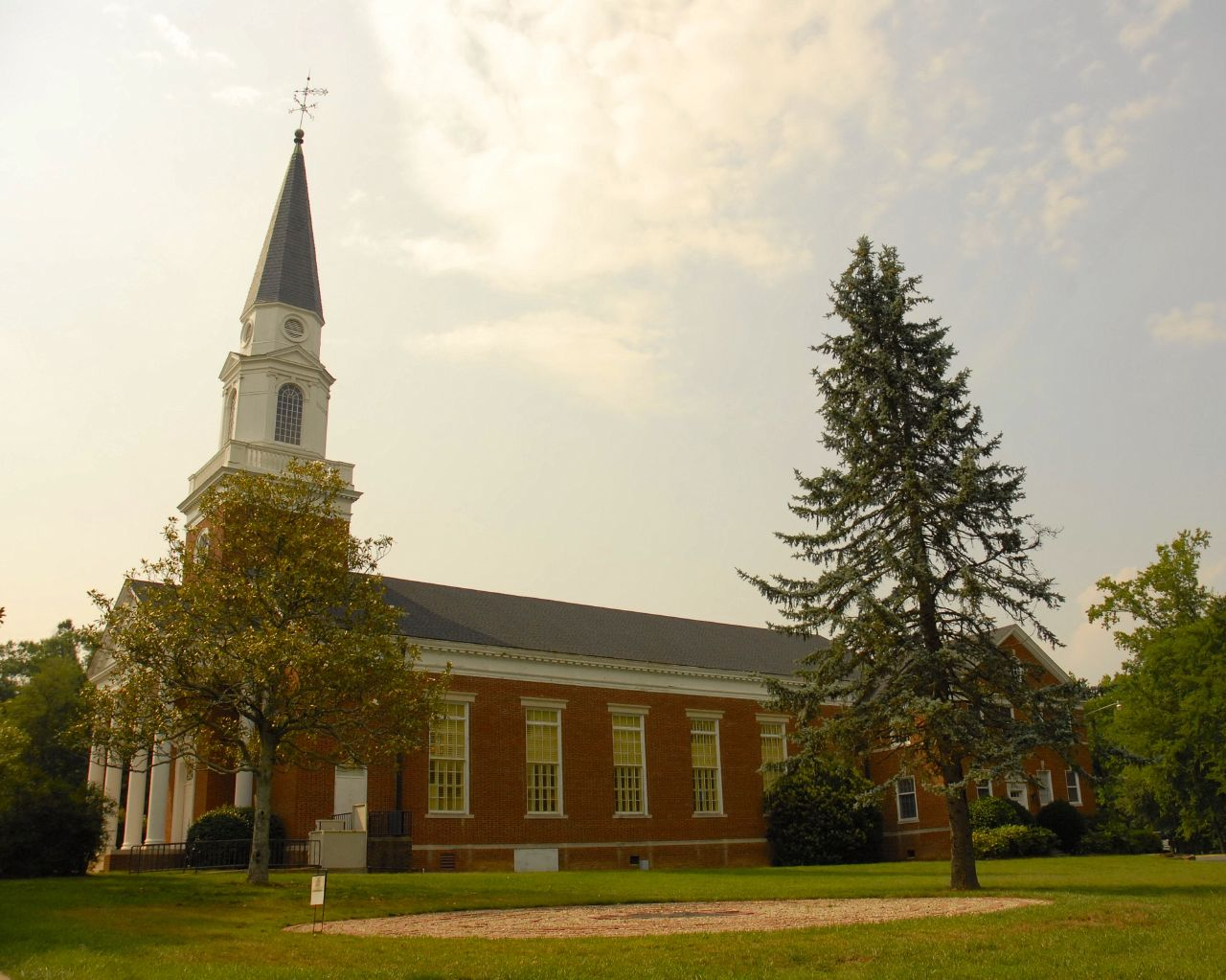
Henry Pfeiffer Chapel

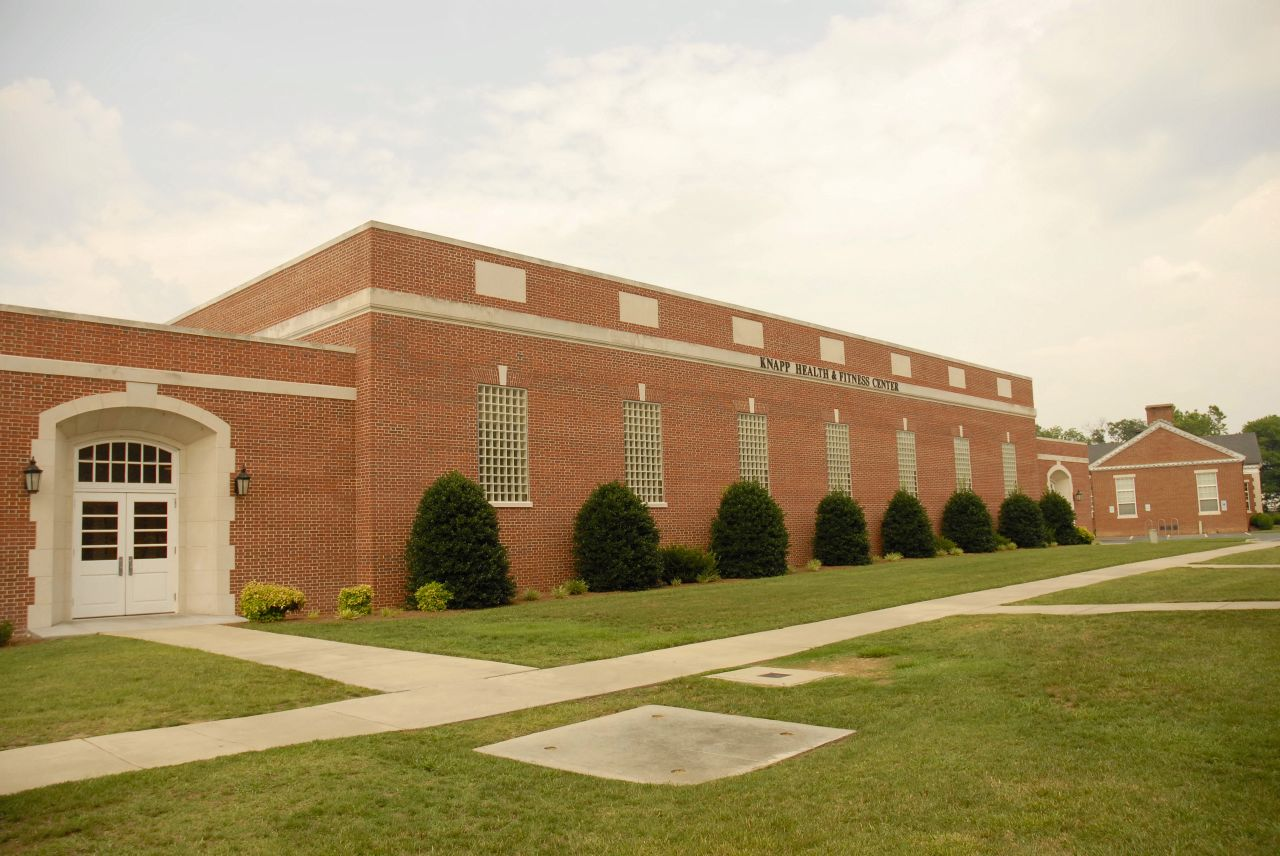
Knapp Health and Fitness Center

== Athletics ==
Pfeiffer's athletic teams are known as the Falcons. They previously competed in the NCAA's Division II as a member of the Conference Carolinas (formerly the Carolinas-Virginia Athletic Conference), but transitioned to Division III and joined the D-III USA South Athletic Conference in 2017. Men's teams include baseball, basketball, cross country, golf, lacrosse, soccer, tennis, and track and field. Women's sports consist of basketball, cross country, golf, lacrosse, soccer, softball, swimming, tennis and volleyball.

== Notable alumni ==
- Susan Abulhawa, International best selling author
- Keith Crisco, North Carolina Secretary of Commerce
- Antonio Harvey, former professional basketball player
- Vincent Maddalone, professional boxer

== Gray Stone Day School ==
Gray Stone Day School, a charter high school, started in Pfeiffer's Harris Building in 2002 and moved to its own campus in 2011, on land donated by Pfeiffer.
