= Red Cross, North Carolina =

- Town
- Interactive map of Red Cross, North Carolina
- Coordinates: 35°15′59″N 80°21′44″W
- Country: United States
- State: North Carolina
- County: Stanly

Area
  - Total: 3.73 sq mi (9.67 km^{2})
  - Land: 3.73 sq mi (9.67 km^{2})
  - Water: 0 sq mi (0.00 km^{2})
- Elevation: 659 ft (201 m)

Population (2020)
  - Total: 762
  - Density: 204.1/sq mi (78.82/km^{2})
- Time zone: UTC-5 (Eastern (EST))
  - Summer (DST): UTC-4 (EDT)
- ZIP code: N/A
- Area code: 704
- FIPS code: 37-55460
- GNIS feature ID: 2407184
- Website: https://www.townofredcross.com/

Red Cross is a town in Stanly County, North Carolina, United States. As of the 2020 census, Red Cross had a population of 762.

== History ==
With growth resulting from the expansion of suburban communities around Charlotte, Red Cross incorporated on August 1, 2002. The people wanted to keep their area agricultural and rural to the extent that it was possible.

== Demographics ==
Historical population
Census	Pop.	Note	%±
2010	742		—
2020	762		2.7%
U.S. Decennial Census

=== 2020 census ===
Red Cross racial composition
Race	Number	Percentage
White (non-Hispanic)	697	91.47%
Black or African American (non-Hispanic)	4	0.52%
Native American	2	0.26%
Other/Mixed	22	2.89%
Hispanic or Latino	37	4.86%

As of the 2020 United States census, there were 762 people, 323 households, and 177 families residing in the town.
