= Oakboro, North Carolina =

- Town
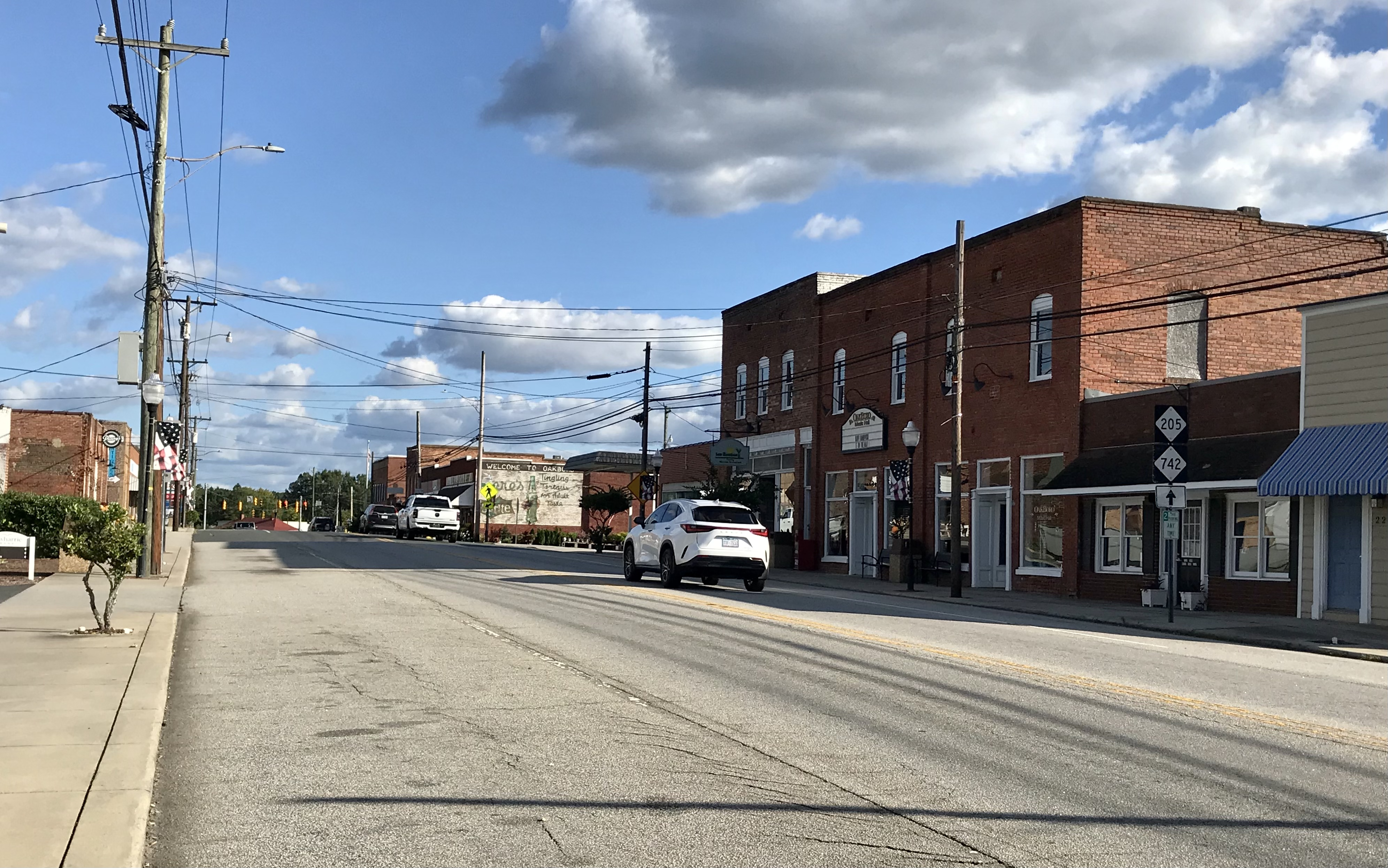
- North Main Street

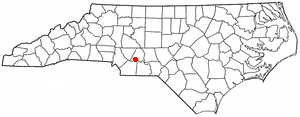
- Location of Oakboro, North Carolina
- Coordinates: 35°13′45″N 80°20′04″W
- Country: United States
- State: North Carolina
- County: Stanly

Government
  - Mayor: Chris Huneycutt

Area
  - Total: 2.51 sq mi (6.50 km^{2})
  - Land: 2.51 sq mi (6.50 km^{2})
  - Water: 0 sq mi (0.00 km^{2})
- Elevation: 515 ft (157 m)

Population (2020)
  - Total: 2,128
  - Density: 847.8/sq mi (327.33/km^{2})
- Time zone: UTC-5 (Eastern (EST))
  - Summer (DST): UTC-4 (EDT)
- ZIP code: 28129
- Area codes: 704, 980
- FIPS code: 37-48040
- GNIS feature ID: 2407023
- Website: https://oakboro.gov/

Oakboro is a town in Stanly County, North Carolina, United States. As of the 2020 census, Oakboro had a population of 2,128.

== Geography ==
According to the United States Census Bureau, the town has a total area of 2.0 square miles (5.2 km^{2}), all land.

== History ==
Oakboro developed because of a predecessor of the (first) Norfolk Southern Railway. The original town started at a natural salt lick called Big Lick. When the railroad passed through in 1913, the town moved closer to the railroad and became "Furr Town". In 1915, the name was changed to Oakboro.

The Oakboro Cotton Mill was a major employer in the 1940s and 1950s while cotton was still "king" of the South. Later, the mill moved across the railroad to form Stanly Knitting Mills.

== Demographics ==
Historical population
Census	Pop.	Note	%±
1920	282		—
1930	421		49.3%
1940	503		19.5%
1950	631		25.4%
1960	581		−7.9%
1970	568		−2.2%
1980	587		3.3%
1990	600		2.2%
2000	1,198		99.7%
2010	1,859		55.2%
2020	2,128		14.5%
U.S. Decennial Census

=== 2020 census ===
As of the 2020 census, Oakboro had a population of 2,128. The median age was 35.6 years. 26.2% of residents were under the age of 18 and 13.4% were 65 years of age or older. For every 100 females there were 97.0 males, and for every 100 females age 18 and over there were 94.4 males age 18 and over.

0.0% of residents lived in urban areas, while 100.0% lived in rural areas.

There were 836 households in Oakboro, of which 37.9% had children under the age of 18 living in them. Of all households, 53.7% were married-couple households, 17.3% were households with a male householder and no spouse or partner present, and 23.2% were households with a female householder and no spouse or partner present. About 23.4% of all households were made up of individuals and 8.8% had someone living alone who was 65 years of age or older. There were 551 families residing in the town.

There were 884 housing units, of which 5.4% were vacant. The homeowner vacancy rate was 0.4% and the rental vacancy rate was 2.4%.

Oakboro racial composition
Race	Number	Percentage
White (non-Hispanic)	1,579	74.2%
Black or African American (non-Hispanic)	258	12.12%
Native American	8	0.38%
Asian	33	1.55%
Other/Mixed	57	2.68%
Hispanic or Latino	193	9.07%

=== 2000 census ===
At the 2000 census, there were 1,198 people, 485 households and 361 families residing in the town. The population density was 595.1 inhabitants per square mile (229.8/km^{2}). There were 535 housing units at an average density of 265.8 per square mile (102.6/km^{2}). The racial makeup of the town was 75.79% White, 19.70% African American, 0.67% Native American, 0.33% Asian, 2.25% from other races, and 1.25% from two or more races. Hispanic or Latino of any race were 3.42% of the population.

There were 485 households, of which 29.7% had children under the age of 18 living with them, 56.3% were married couples living together, 14.2% had a female householder with no husband present, and 25.4% were non-families. 23.7% of all households were made up of individuals, and 11.8% had someone living alone who was 65 years of age or older. The average household size was 2.46 and the average family size was 2.86.

23.2% of the population were under the age of 18, 8.5% from 18 to 24, 28.6% from 25 to 44, 24.9% from 45 to 64, and 14.8% who were 65 years of age or older. The median age was 38 years. For every 100 females, there were 91.1 males. For every 100 females age 18 and over, there were 88.5 males.

The median household income was $41,369 and the median family income was $46,711. Males had a median income of $33,482 compared with $21,696 for females. The per capita income for the town was $18,079. About 8.6% of families and 11.5% of the population were below the poverty line, including 17.3% of those under age 18 and 21.4% of those age 65 or over.

== Culture ==
Today Oakboro is known for its annual Independence Day parade and for hosting a classic car cruise-in on the fourth Friday of every month.

== Notable people ==
- B. J. Hill, NFL player
- Bruton Smith, CEO of Speedway Motorsports.
