= Forbush =

Forbush can refer to:

== Fictional characters ==
- Forbush Man, a character in the comic book Not Brand Echh
- Nellie Forbush, a character in the musical South Pacific

== People ==
- Scott Forbush (1904–1984), astronomer
- Edward Howe Forbush, ornithologist and author of Birds of New England

== Places ==
- Forbush, Iowa, an unincorporated community
- Forbush Township, Yadkin County, North Carolina, USA
- Forbush, North Carolina, a community within Forbush Township
- Forbush Lake on Vancouver Island

== Other ==
- Forbush decrease, in astronomy, a decrease in observed cosmic ray intensity
