= Footville, North Carolina =

Footville
- Unincorporated community
- Location within the state of North Carolina
- Coordinates: 36°03′38″N 80°42′07″W
- Country: United States
- State: North Carolina
- County: Yadkin
- Elevation: 1,037 ft (316 m)
- Time zone: UTC-5 (Eastern (EST))
  - Summer (DST): UTC-4 (EDT)
- GNIS feature ID: 1006206

Footville is an unincorporated community in southern Yadkin County, North Carolina, United States. The community, in the Deep Creek Township, is on Lone Hickory Road, just east of the community of Lone Hickory and near the Davie and Iredell County lines to the south. The community is named for Major James H. Foote, who settled in the area circa 1807.

Footville is in the Yadkinville ZIP code area (27055).

In the early 19th century, Footville was a stopping place on the stagecoach road that ran from Salem west to Wilkesboro and the half-way point between Salisbury and Wilkesboro. Guests stayed at what was known as the Footville Inn, which was first built by Foote. According to family tradition, Andy Laugenour acquired the house in 1863, trading a slave girl for the property. The home, which still stands, once served as the community's only store and post office. The Laugenour House, a brick home built in 1853, is also in the community.

An 1895 atlas lists the community's population at 20.
