= Smithtown, North Carolina =

Smithtown
- Census-designated place
- Location within the state of North Carolina
- Coordinates: 36°13′57″N 80°34′16″W
- Country: United States
- State: North Carolina
- County: Yadkin

Area
  - Total: 1.35 sq mi (3.49 km^{2})
  - Land: 1.34 sq mi (3.47 km^{2})
  - Water: 0.0077 sq mi (0.02 km^{2})
- Elevation: 1,099 ft (335 m)

Population (2020)
  - Total: 224
  - Density: 167.2/sq mi (64.56/km^{2})
- Time zone: UTC-5 (Eastern (EST))
  - Summer (DST): UTC-4 (EDT)
- FIPS code: 37-62580
- GNIS feature ID: 2812803

Smithtown is an unincorporated community and census-designated place (CDP) in northern Yadkin County, North Carolina, United States. It was first listed as a CDP in the 2020 census with a population of 224.

Located in the North Fall Creek Township, it was chartered in 1925 and named for three Smith Brothers who operated a small furniture factory and cabinet shop there. The community is in the East Bend ZIP code area. Until 1909 a post office known as Poindexter – named after early settlers C.W. Poindexter, a postmaster, and S.A. Poindexter – served the area.

Smithtown was once on a main route linking Winston to Boonville. Today the community, centered on Smithtown Road, includes several historic homes. Prominent landmarks include two Methodist Churches that are less than a mile apart, Prospect United Methodist Church, which was organized in 1830, and New Home UMC, which was first built in 1885. Both churches used the same building from 1867–1885, but had separate pastors – Prospect was part of Methodist Episcopal Church, South and New Home the Methodist Episcopal Church.

== Demographics ==
Historical population
Census	Pop.	Note	%±
2020	224		—
U.S. Decennial Census; 2020

=== 2020 census ===
Smithtown CDP, North Carolina – Demographic Profile (NH = Non-Hispanic)
Race / Ethnicity	Pop 2020	% 2020
White alone (NH)	186	83.04%
Black or African American alone (NH)	2	0.89%
Native American or Alaska Native alone (NH)	0	0.00%
Asian alone (NH)	0	0.00%
Pacific Islander alone (NH)	0	0.00%
Some Other Race alone (NH)	2	0.89%
Mixed Race/Multi-Racial (NH)	5	2.23%
Hispanic or Latino (any race)	29	12.95%
Total	224	100.00%

Note: the US Census treats Hispanic/Latino as an ethnic category. This table excludes Latinos from the racial categories and assigns them to a separate category. Hispanics/Latinos can be of any race.
