= Hamptonville =

Hamptonville may refer to:

- Hamptonville, California, former name of Friant, California
- Hamptonville, North Carolina
