= Unifi Manufacturing =

Unifi Manufacturing, Inc.
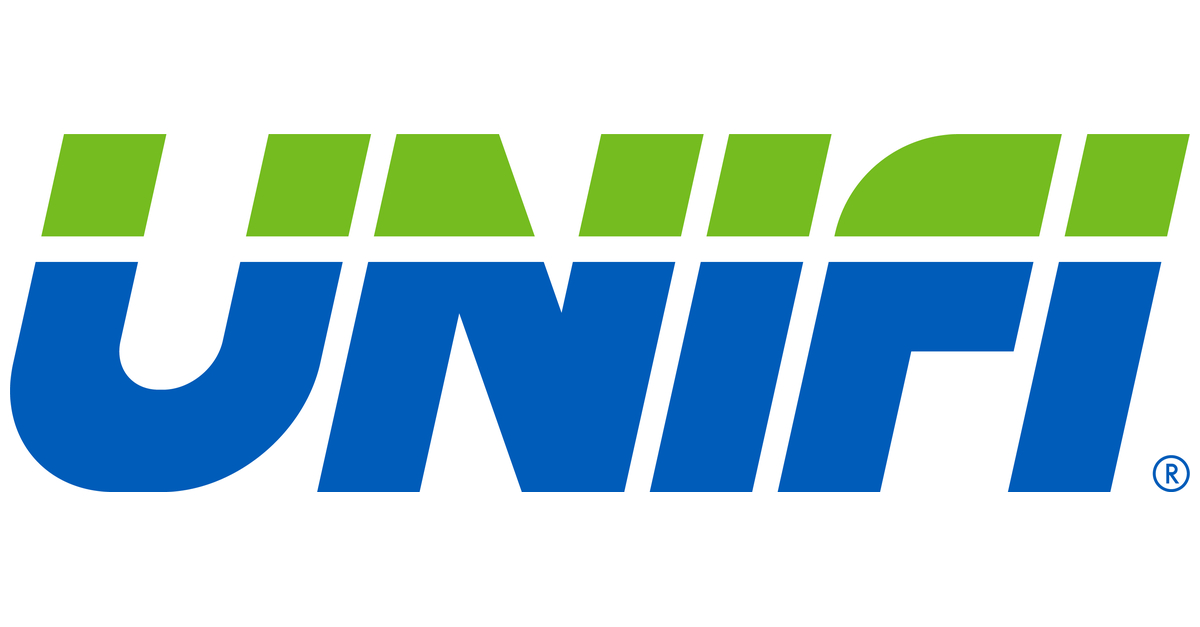
- Company type: Public
- Traded as: NYSE: UFI
- Industry: Textiles
- Founded: July 1971; 54 years ago
- Headquarters: Greensboro, North Carolina
- Number of employees: 2900
- Website: unifi.com

Unifi Manufacturing, Inc. is an American-based international textile manufacturing company which specializes in polyester yarns.

== History ==
In 1971, Allen Mebane, Bill Kretzer, and several other executives left their positions at Universal Textured Yarns to establish their own textile company. In July, they organized Unifi with headquarters in Greensboro, North Carolina, United States. Unifi's first plant was established in Yadkin County that year to texturize polyester yarn. The company expanded quickly, opening additional facilities in Yadkinville establishing a fabric dyeing and finishing plant in Rocky Mount later that year to process its products from Yadkin. With additional growth throughout North Carolina and internationally, by the late 1980s and early 1990s, Unifi was one of the United States' largest textile companies. It acquired nylon production through its merger with Macfield in 1991. In 1993 the company began acquiring cotton yarn producers. By 1996, it operated 20 mills, and that year Fortune listed Unifi as the best American textile company.

In the 1990s the American textile industry faced rapidly growing competition from Asian companies' cheaper products. Many American fabric-weaving companies which Unifi sold its yarns to went bankrupt. The company reacted by cutting costs, leading to layoffs and plant closures. Between 2000 and 2005, Unifi shrank from 5,126 American workers to 3,431. In August 2007, the board of directors removed the company's chief executive officer and five board members resigned, causing consternation among economic analysts about Unifi's future viability. The company rebounded with a return to profitability in 2010, largely aided by its embrace of a niche market for polyester yarns made from recycled plastics.

== Operations ==
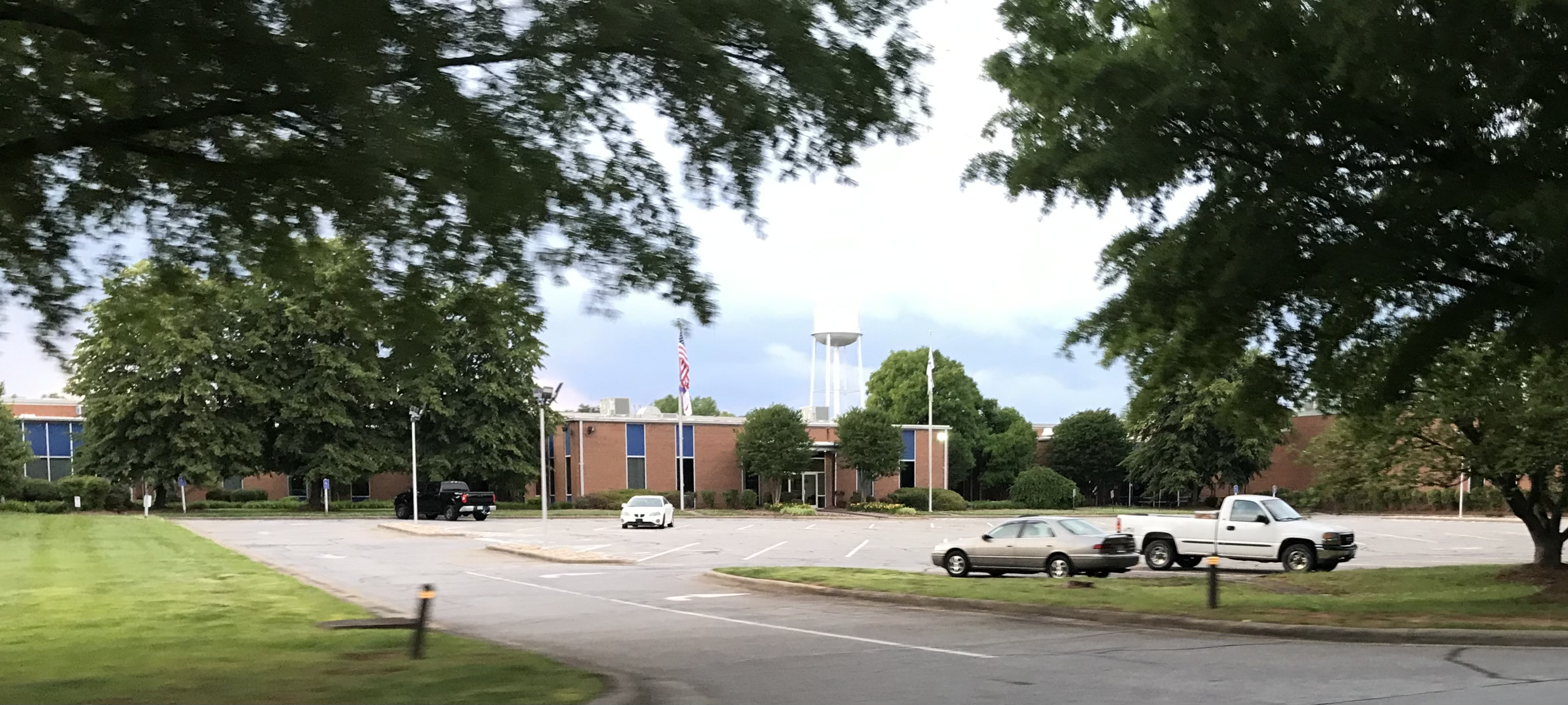
Unifi facility in Reidsville, North Carolina

Unifi is headquartered in Greensboro, North Carolina. As of June 30, 2024 it had 2,900 employees and operations in the United States, Colombia, El Salvador, and Brazil. Of its workforce, about 1,600 employees worked in North Carolina. The company is publicly traded and in February 2025 had a market capitalization of $114.5 million. Unifi is the largest private employer in Yadkin County.

Unifi specializes in creating synthetic textile products from plastic bottles and textile waste. It processes collected recyclable PET plastic at its facility in Reidsville into chips. The plastic chips are processed into Unifi's proprietary REPREVE yarn at a plant in Yadkinville and then are returned to the Reidsville facility and dyed before being sold to apparel makers and other companies. Sales of REPREVE yarn account for 30 percent of the company's revenue. Major brands that use the yarn include Nike, UGG, Levi Strauss & Co., Patagonia, and North Face.
