= Leo Arnaud =

French-American arranger and composer (1904–1991)

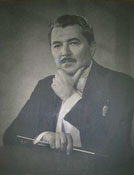

Background information
- Also known as: Leo Vauchant
- Born: Noël Léon Marius Arnaud; July 24, 1904; Lyon, France
- Died: April 26, 1991 (aged 86) Hamptonville, North Carolina, U.S.
- Genres: Film scores
- Occupations: Arranger, composer, and orchestrator
- Instruments: Cello and trombone
- Years active: 1930s–1960s

Noël Léon Marius Arnaud (July 24, 1904 – April 26, 1991), known professionally as Leo Arnaud (/ˈleɪ.oʊ ɑːrˈnoʊ/), was a French American arranger, composer, and trombonist. He composed "Bugler's Dream", which is used as the theme by television networks presenting the Olympic Games in the United States.

Arnaud studied composition at conservatories in Lyon and Paris with Maurice Ravel and Vincent d'Indy. After playing as a jazz trombonist in France using the name Leo Vauchant and arranging for the Jack Hylton band in England from 1928 to 1930, he immigrated to the United States in 1931. He worked in Hollywood as an arranger for Fred Waring before joining Metro-Goldwyn-Mayer as an arranger, composer, and orchestrator from 1936 to 1966.

In 1980, Arnaud left Hollywood and retired to Yadkin County, North Carolina. His wife, Faye Brooks Arnaud, was a native of the area. He is buried at Asbury United Methodist Church in Hamptonville, North Carolina.

== "Bugler's Dream" ==
"Bugler's Dream" is very well known in the United States as theme music for the Olympic Games from its use in ABC Olympic broadcasts and NBC Olympic broadcasts of the games beginning with the 1964 Summer Olympics in Tokyo. It is considered an Olympic symbol. Arnaud's piece is very stately, beginning with a timpani cadence that is soon joined by a distinctive theme in brass.

The musical theme of "Bugler's Dream" is based on Joseph-David Buhl's "Salut aux étendards", a typical cavalry trumpet's call, composed during Napoleon's French Consulate.

Arnaud was commissioned by conductor Felix Slatkin to create a piece for his album Charge! in 1958. For this, he wrote "The Charge Suite", published by Shawnee Press, which included "Bugler's Dream". ABC began using the composition as the theme to ABC Olympic broadcasts of the 1964 Winter Olympics in Innsbruck, Austria, and in future Olympics. It was also used as the title piece for the series ABC's Wide World of Sports. NBC went with an alternate theme in 1988 when it obtained the rights to the 1988 Summer Olympics in Seoul, South Korea, but brought "Bugler's Dream" back for NBC Olympic broadcasts of the 1992 Summer Olympics in Barcelona, Spain.

On the Boston Pops Orchestra album Summon the Heroes, released for the 1996 Summer Olympics in Atlanta, Georgia, "Bugler's Dream" was combined in a medley with composer John Williams' "Olympic symbols". The medley consists of Williams's arrangement of "Bugler's Dream"—similar to Arnaud's original but with a repeat of the theme with a full orchestra—followed by Williams's composition written for the 1984 Summer Olympics in Los Angeles, California. Williams's arrangement of "Bugler's Dream / Olympic Fanfare and Theme" was used in the 2010 Winter Olympics closing ceremony and has continued to be used in later Olympic coverage by NBC.

== Filmography ==
- The Competition (1980) (conducting coach)
- Ryan's Daughter (1970) (orchestrator)
- Blue (1968) (orchestrator)
- The F.B.I. (two episodes, 1965) (composer)
- Hollywood My Home Town (1965) (orchestrator)
- The Unsinkable Molly Brown (1964) (orchestrator)
- Hollywood Without Make-Up (1963) (orchestrator)
- Billy Rose's Jumbo (1962) (orchestrator)
- Horas de pánico (1957) (conductor)
- Seven Brides for Seven Brothers (1954) (orchestrator)
- Rose Marie (1954) (orchestrator)
- Sombrero (1953) (musical director)
- Stars and Stripes Forever (1952) (orchestrator)
- Lovely to Look At (1952) (orchestrator)
- The Strip (1951) (orchestrator)
- Two Weeks with Love (1950) (orchestrator)
- Three Little Words (1950) (music arranger)
- That Midnight Kiss (1949) (orchestrator)
- Neptune's Daughter (1949) (orchestrator)
- The Barkleys of Broadway (1949) (music arranger)
- The Kissing Bandit (1948) (composer: incidental music) (music arranger)
- One Touch of Venus (1948) (musical director)
- Easter Parade (1948) (orchestrator)
- A Date with Judy (1948) (orchestrator)
- Big City (1948) (orchestrator)
- Hit Parade of 1947 (1947) (orchestrator)
- Apache Rose (1947) (composer: incidental music) (uncredited)
- Calendar Girl (1947) (orchestrator)
- The Thrill of Brazil (1946) (musical director)
- DuBarry Was a Lady (1943) (orchestrator)
- Best Foot Forward (1943) (orchestrator)
- For Me and My Gal (1942) (music arranger: vocals) (orchestrator)
- Panama Hattie (1942) (vocal and orchestral arrangements)
- Berlin Correspondent (1942) (orchestrator) (uncredited)
- Iceland (1942) (orchestrator) (uncredited)
- Ship Ahoy (1942) (music arranger: vocals) (orchestrator)
- Rio Rita (1942) (music arranger: vocals) (orchestrator)
- Son of Fury: The Story of Benjamin Blake (1942) (orchestrator) (uncredited)
- Babes on Broadway (1941) (music arranger: vocals) (orchestrator)
- Remember the Day (1941) (orchestrator) (uncredited)
- Two-Faced Woman (1941) (orchestrator)
- You'll Never Get Rich (1941) (music arranger) (uncredited)
- Lady Be Good (1941) (music arranger: vocals) (orchestrator)
- The Big Store (1941) (music arranger: vocals) (orchestrator)
- Ziegfeld Girl (1941) (music arranger: vocal arrangements) (orchestrator)
- Blondie Goes Latin (1941) (music arranger)
- Murder Over New York (1940) (orchestrator) (uncredited)
- Hullabaloo (1940) (orchestrator)
- Third Finger, Left Hand (1940) (arranger: "Hail to California", "Carmen Ohio") (uncredited)
- Strike Up the Band (1940) (music arranger: vocals) (orchestrator)
- Yesterday's Heroes (1940) (orchestrator) (uncredited)
- Andy Hardy Meets Debutante (1940) (music arranger: vocals) (orchestrator)
- Two Girls on Broadway (1940) (orchestrator)
- Broadway Melody of 1940 (1940) (orchestrator)
- I Take This Woman (1940) (orchestrator) (uncredited)
- The Earl of Chicago (1940) (orchestrator) (uncredited)
- Babes in Arms (1939) (orchestrator)
- The Wizard of Oz (1939) (orchestrator: Munchkinland musical sequence) (uncredited)
- Lady of the Tropics (1939) (orchestrator) (uncredited)
- Broadway Serenade (1939) (vocal and orchestral direction)
- Society Lawyer (1939) (orchestrator)
- The Ice Follies of 1939 (1939) (music arranger: orchestral arrangements / vocal arrangements)
- Boys Town (1938) (music arranger)
- Marie Antoinette (1938) (orchestrator) (uncredited)
- The Girl of the Golden West (1938) (music arranger: vocal arrangements) (orchestrator)
- Of Human Hearts (1938) (orchestrator) (uncredited)
- Rosalie (1937) (music arranger: vocal arrangements) (orchestrator)
- Broadway Melody of 1938 (1937) (music arranger: orchestral and vocal arrangements)
- A Day at the Races (1937) (music arranger: choral and orchestral)
- Carnival in Paris (1937) (vocal and orchestral arrangements)
- Song of Revolt (1937) (vocal and orchestral arrangements)
- Sinner Take All (1936) (composer: stock music) (uncredited)
- Born to Dance (1936) (music arranger: choral)
- Violets in Spring (1936) (vocal and orchestral arrangements)

== Awards ==
Arnaud was nominated for an Academy Award for Best Original Score for The Unsinkable Molly Brown (1964) at the 37th Academy Awards, presented in 1965. It was a co-nomination with six other men who also wrote the film's music, with Arnaud doing orchestration.
