= Courtney, North Carolina =

Courtney
- Unincorporated community
- Location within the state of North Carolina
- Coordinates: 36°03′36″N 80°37′14″W
- Country: United States
- State: North Carolina
- County: Yadkin
- Elevation: 902 ft (275 m)
- Time zone: UTC-5 (Eastern (EST))
  - Summer (DST): UTC-4 (EDT)
- GNIS feature ID: 1019806

Courtney is an unincorporated community in southeastern Yadkin County, North Carolina, United States.

The area is in the county's South Liberty Township and bounded on the north by Yadkinville and extending south to the Davie County line and community of Wyo. To the east is the community of Huntsville, and west is Lone Hickory. The community is in the Yadkinville ZIP code area (27055).

== History ==
Religion has played an important role in the community from the early days. Cross Roads Baptist Church was organized in 1835 in what was then known as Bryan Settlement. The church was built at an important crossroads along the Great Wagon Road. Early minutes of the church refer to it as Chinquapin Cross Roads. The church held the first Sunday school in Yadkin County. The church, which changed its name to Courtney Baptist in 1952, helped organize several other Baptist churches in the area, including Deep Creek, South Oak Ridge and Turner's Creek.

Courtney is named for a "Mr. Courtney" who taught in a local school.

=== Gold mines ===
Gold was mined in the Courtney area from about 1875 until the 1920s. The Groce Gold Mine operated from 1875 until about 1920.

The Dixon Gold Mine on Wyo Road mined gold from 1902-1923. Thomas M. Dixon first discovered gold on the property. He began panning for gold, then he found a vein of gold three feet under the ground.

Both mines have long closed. However, Vulcan Materials owns land for a granite quarry nearby on Speer Bridge Road.

== Homegrown businesses ==
The community is primarily rural and agricultural. However, because of its proximity to Winston-Salem it has become more of a bedroom community. Several home-grown businesses provide employment for area residents:

- Hanover Park Vineyard, the first licensed winery in Yadkin County since Prohibition, opened on Courtney-Huntsville Road in 1999. A farm house built in 1897 was transformed into the vineyard's tasting room.
- Yadkin Valley Telecom, based on Courtney-Huntsville Road since 1971, is a telephone cooperative that serves about 32,000 customers in Yadkin County and portions of Davie and Iredell counties.
- J.H. Craver and Son began as a maker of hickory tool handles in 1920. The company, which makes and imports wooden chairs and tables, moved to a plant on U.S. Highway 601 in 1960.
- Hibco Plastics, a maker of foam packaging, is located on U.S. Highway 601.
- Courtney General Store, Courtney Grocery and Hollars General Store offer area residents conveniences such as food and groceries.
- Reavis welding & muffler est.1973

== Education ==
Most children in the community attend Courtney Elementary School, a kindergarten through fifth-grade public community school on Courtney-Huntsville Road. The school is an important focal point for the community. Courtney is one of five feeder schools for Forbush High School, which is located north of the community.

Courtney, established in 1927, was the first standard high school in Yadkin County. It became an elementary-only school after school consolidation in 1967. The school was mostly rebuilt after a 1986 countywide bond referendum.
