= Boonville Township =

Boonville Township may refer to the following townships in the United States:

- Boonville Township, Cooper County, Missouri
- Boonville Township, Yadkin County, North Carolina
