= North Liberty Township, Yadkin County, North Carolina =

Township in Yadkin County, North Carolina, U.S.

Coordinates: 36.1360291°N 80.6548882°W

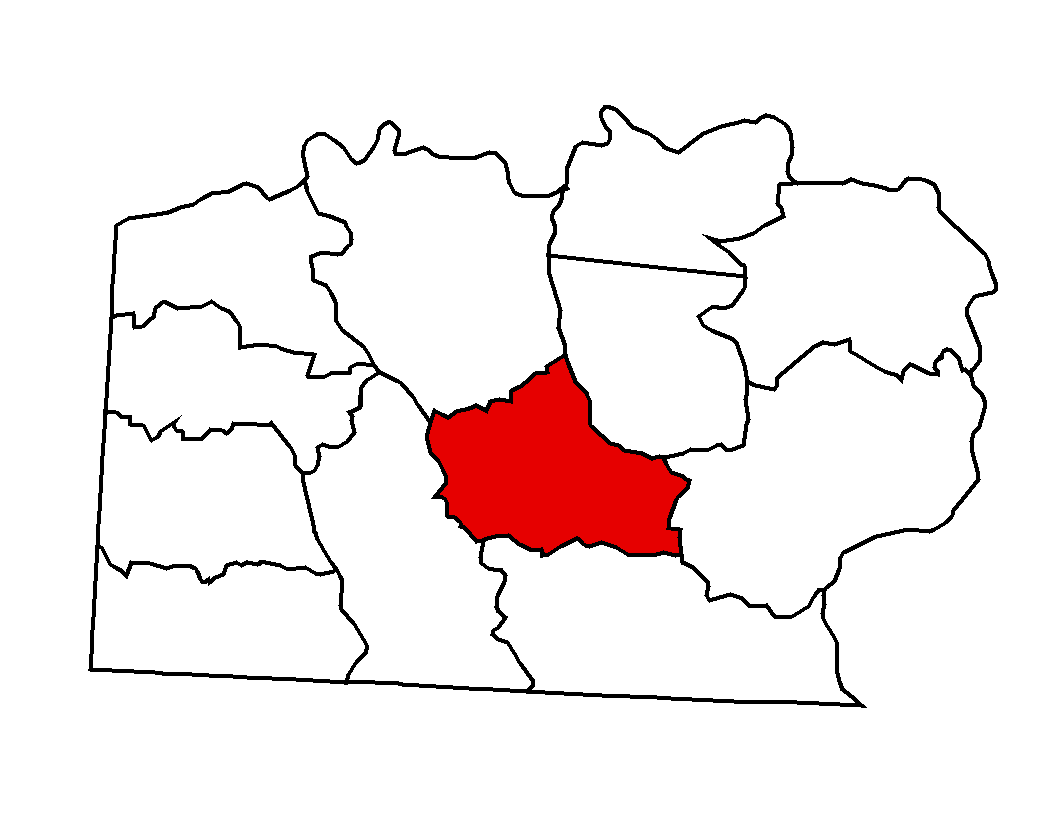
Location of North Liberty Township in Yadkin County, N.C.

North Liberty Township is one of twelve townships in Yadkin County, North Carolina, United States. The township had a population of 6,385 according to the 2020 census.

Geographically, North Liberty Township occupies 24.54 square miles (63.6 km^{2}) in central Yadkin County. The only incorporated municipality within North Liberty Township is the Town of Yadkinville, the county seat of Yadkin County.
