= Second Yadkin County Jail =

Jail museum in North Carolina, US

- U.S. National Register of Historic Places
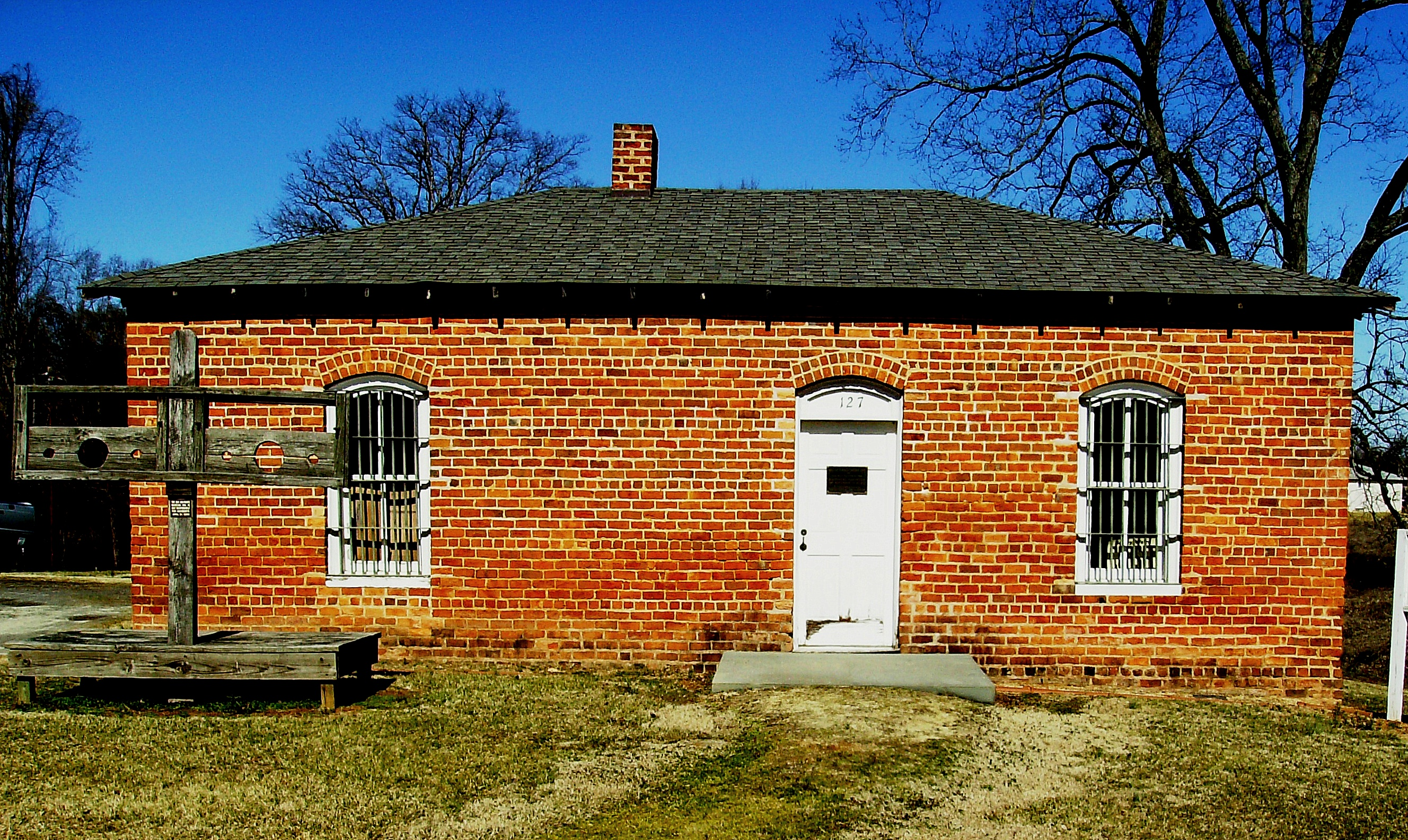
- Second Yadkin County Jail, February 2009

- Location within North Carolina Location within the United States
- Location: 241 E. Hemlock St., Yadkinville, North Carolina
- Coordinates: 36°8′9″N 80°39′24″W
- Area: less than one acre
- Built: 1892
- NRHP reference No.: 88001113
- Added to NRHP: July 21, 1988

Second Yadkin County Jail, also known as the Charles Bruce Davis Museum of Art, History, and Science, is a historic jail building located at Yadkinville, Yadkin County, North Carolina. It was built around 1892, and is a one-story, two room, hip-roofed brick building. It measures 22 feet by 36 feet. The building housed the county jail until 1928 and converted to apartments. The property was donated to the Yadkin County Historical Society in 1976, and restored for use as a museum.

It was listed on the National Register of Historic Places in 1988.
