= Footville =

Footville may refer to:

- Footville, North Carolina
- Footville, Ohio
- Footville, Wisconsin
