= William Wade Hampton (politician) =

American politician (1858–1930)

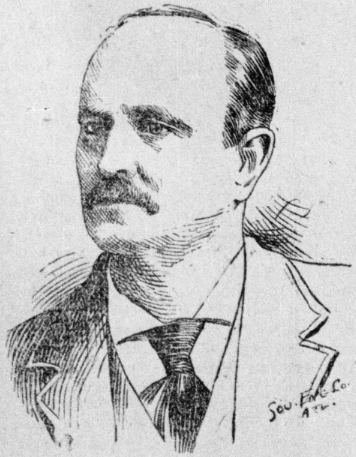
- Hampton in an 1899 newspaper

Member of the North Carolina House of Representatives from the Yadkin and Surry counties district
- In office 1899–1900

Member of the North Carolina Senate from the Yadkin and Surry counties district
- In office 1889–1890

Personal details
- Born: February 1858 Yadkin County, North Carolina, U.S.
- Died: December 14, 1930 (aged 72) Mount Airy, North Carolina, U.S.
- Resting place: Dobson Cemetery
- Party: Republican
- Spouse: Emma Shore (m. 1886)
- Children: 2
- Occupation: Politician

William Wade Hampton (February 1858 – December 14, 1930) was an American politician from North Carolina.

== Early life ==
William Wade Hampton was born in February 1858 in Yadkin County, North Carolina, to Jane and Alfred Hampton.

== Career ==
Hampton served as clerk in Surry County for 12 years. He was a Republican. He represented Yadkin and Surry counties as a member of the North Carolina Senate in 1889 and the North Carolina House of Representatives in 1899. He was deputy collector of internal revenue and was a United States commissioner.

== Personal life ==
Hampton married Emma Shore, daughter of Wiley F. Shore, of Yadkin County on January 19, 1886. They had two sons, Henry Conrad and Wade Bruce. He lived in Dobson.

Hampton died at Martin Memorial Hospital in Mount Airy on December 14, 1930. He was buried in Dobson Cemetery.
