= North Knobs Township, Yadkin County, North Carolina =

Township in Yadkin County, North Carolina, U.S.

Coordinates: 36.2225992°N 80.7990185°W

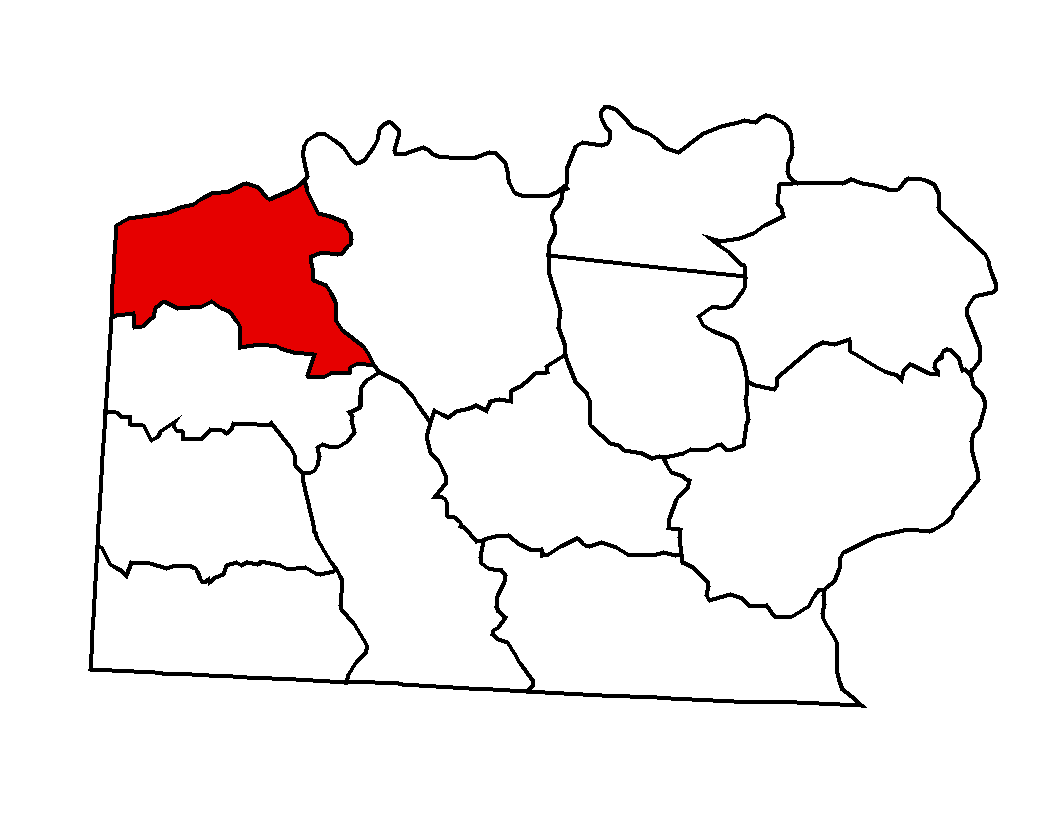
Location of North Knobs Township in Yadkin County, N.C.

North Knobs Township is one of twelve townships in Yadkin County, North Carolina, United States. The township had a population of 4,461 according to the 2000 census.

Geographically, North Knobs Township occupies 22.88 square miles (59.3 km^{2}) in northwestern Yadkin County. North Knobs Township's northern border is the Yadkin River. The only incorporated municipality within North Knobs Township is the Town of Jonesville.
