= South Knobs Township, Yadkin County, North Carolina =

Township in Yadkin County, North Carolina

Coordinates: 36.1812519°N 80.8211696°W

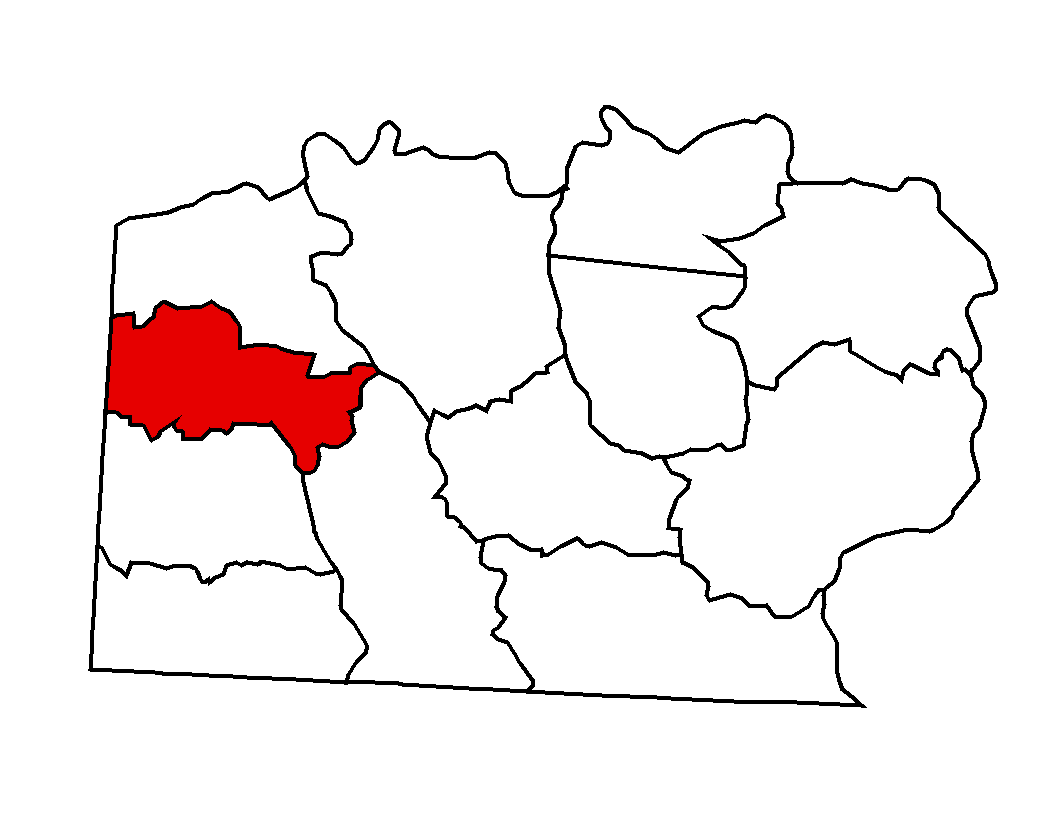
Location of South Knobs Township in Yadkin County, N.C.

South Knobs Township is one of twelve townships in Yadkin County, North Carolina, United States. The township had a population of 1,729 according to the 2000 census.

Geographically, South Knobs Township occupies 20.02 square miles (51.9 km^{2}) in western Yadkin County. South Knobs Township's western border is with Wilkes County. The township includes the unincorporated community of Swan Creek.
