= South Buck Shoals Township, Yadkin County, North Carolina =

Township in Yadkin County, North Carolina, U.S.

Coordinates: 36.073508°N 80.8211696°W

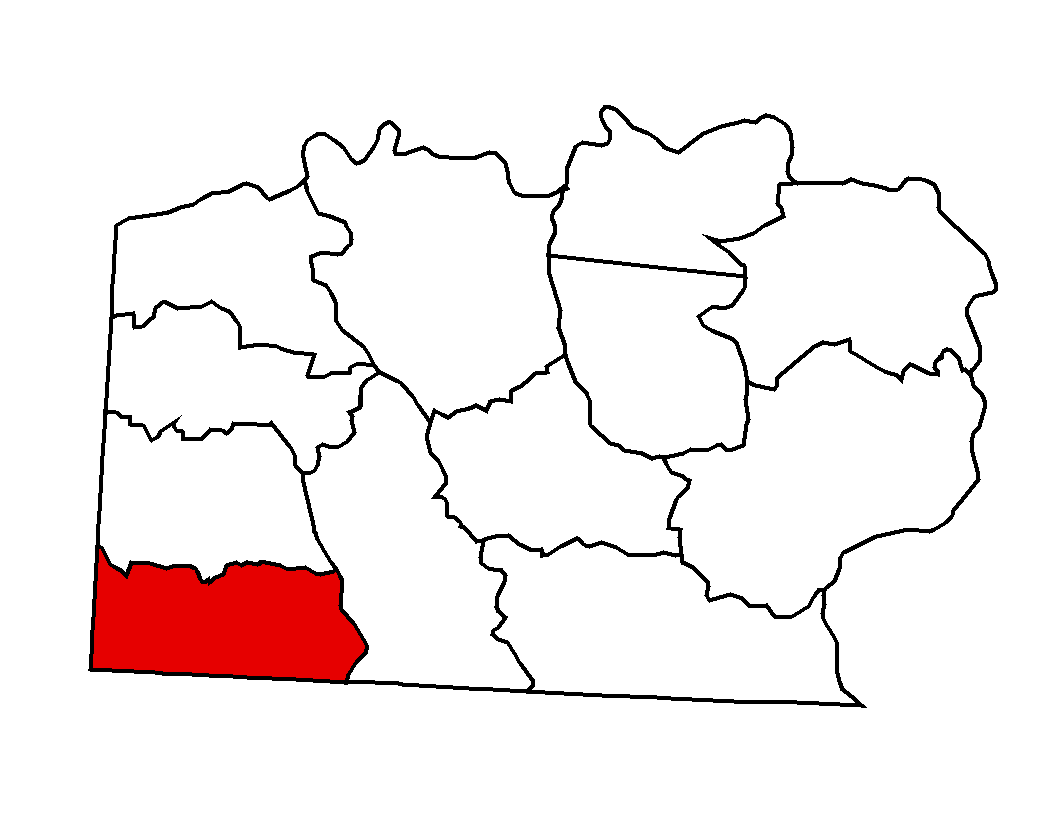
Location of South Buck Shoals Township in Yadkin County, N.C.

South Buck Shoals Township is one of twelve townships in Yadkin County, North Carolina, United States. The township had a population of 1,293 according to the 2000 census.

Geographically, South Buck Shoals Township occupies 21.9 square miles (57 km^{2}) in southwestern Yadkin County. South Buck Shoals Township's western border is with Wilkes County and its southern border is with Iredell County.
