= East Bend Township, Yadkin County, North Carolina =

Township in Yadkin County, North Carolina, U.S.

Coordinates: 36°12′47″N 80°30′26″W

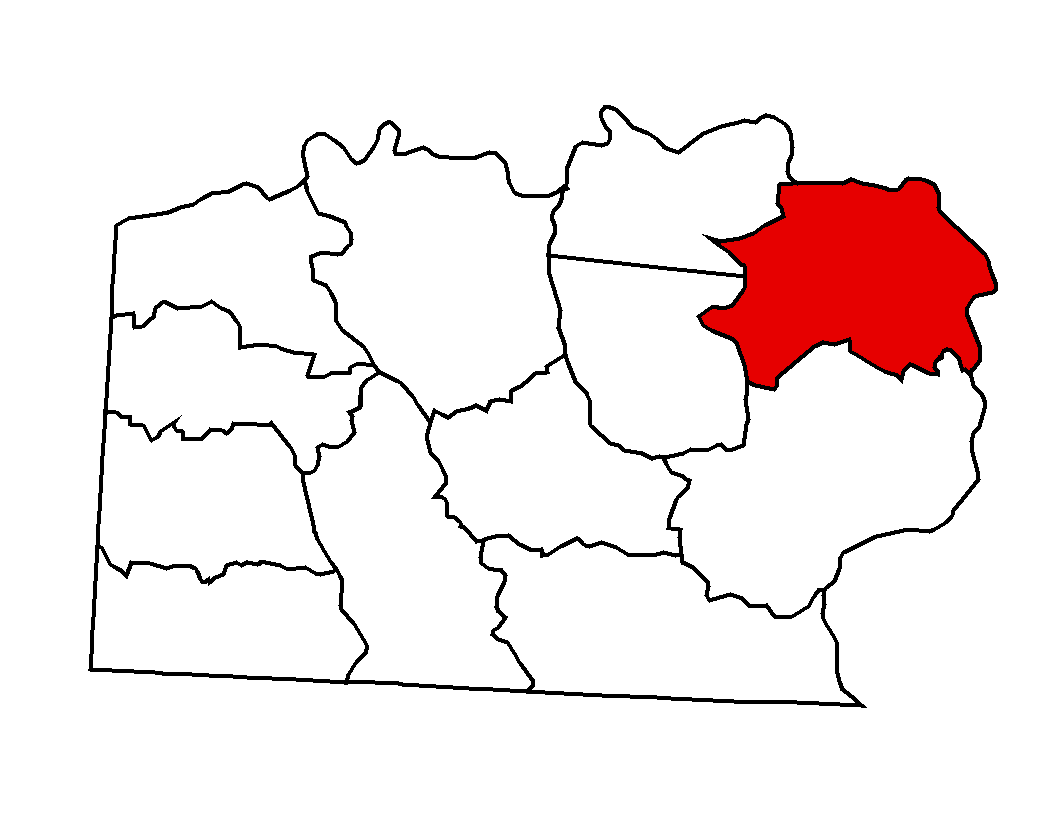
Location of East Bend Township in Yadkin County, N.C.

East Bend Township is one of twelve townships in Yadkin County, North Carolina, United States. The township had a population of 3,383 according to the 2000 census.

Geographically, East Bend Township occupies 32.08 square miles (83.1 km^{2}) in northeastern Yadkin County. East Bend Township's northern and eastern borders are formed by the Yadkin River. The only incorporated municipality within East Bend Township is the Town of East Bend.
