= Swan Creek, North Carolina =

Unincorporated community in North Carolina, US

Swan Creek
- Unincorporated community
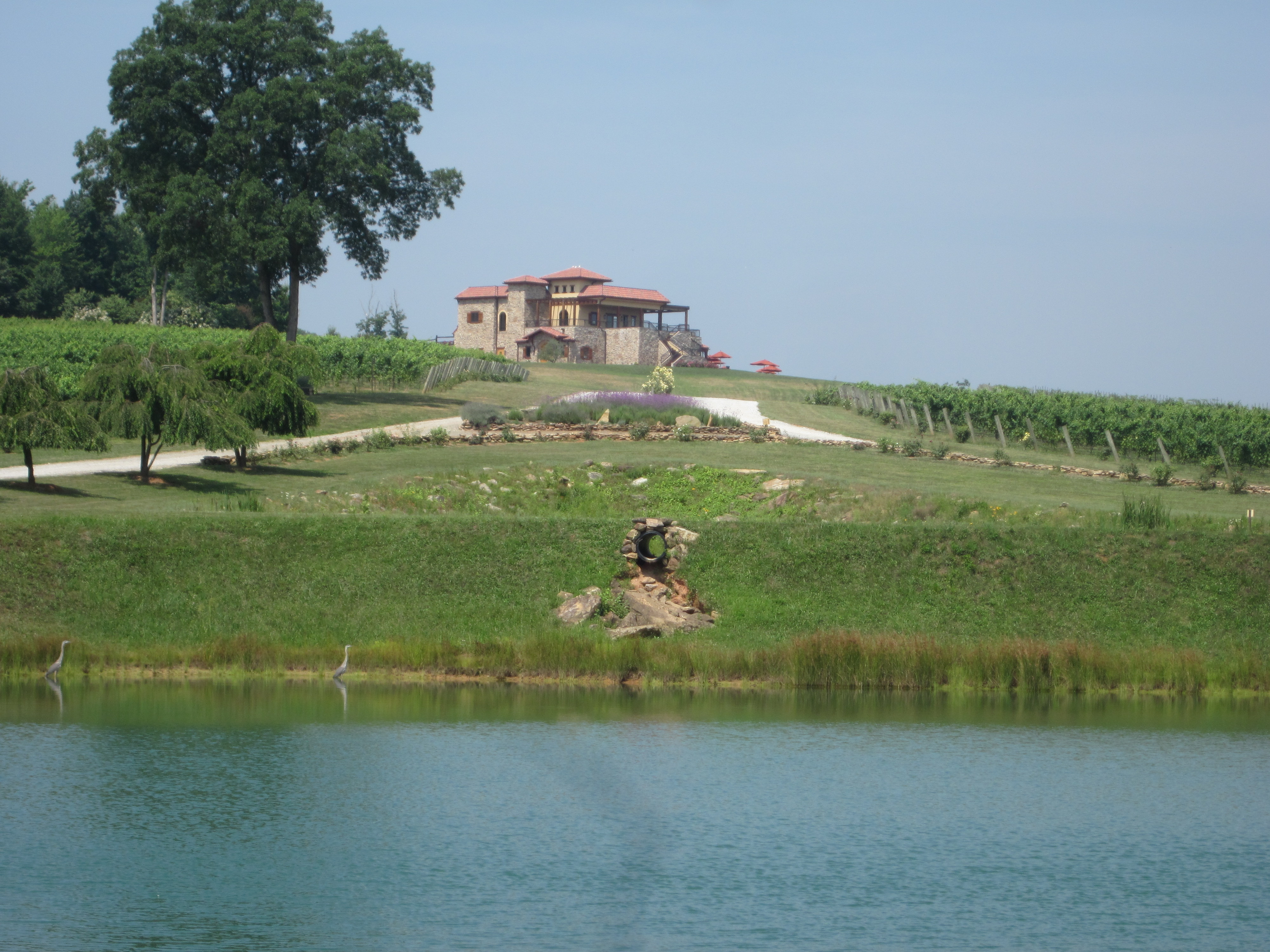
- Raffaldini Vineyards in Swan Creek

- Location within the state of North Carolina
- Coordinates: 36°10′42″N 80°52′08″W
- Country: United States
- State: North Carolina
- County: Yadkin
- Elevation: 1,184 ft (361 m)
- Time zone: UTC-5 (Eastern (EST))
  - Summer (DST): UTC-4 (EDT)
- GNIS feature ID: 1022861

Swan Creek is an unincorporated community in western Yadkin County, North Carolina, United States, south of Jonesville. The community shares its name with the Swan Creek viticultural area.

The AVA includes about 160 square miles (410 km^{2}) in Iredell, Wilkes and Yadkin counties. The designation, the second in North Carolina, took effect May 27, 2008.

There are five vineyards located within the Swan Creek AVA: Raffaldini Vineyards in Ronda, and Windsor Run Cellars, Shadow Springs Vineyard, Dobbins Creek Vineyards, and Laurel Gray Vineyards in Hamptonville.

Swan Creek is named for the wild geese, erroneously called swans, that were spotted resting in a nearby stream. Quaker pioneers first settled in the area before 1797.
