= South Liberty Township, Yadkin County, North Carolina =

Township in Yadkin County, North Carolina, U.S.

Coordinates: 36.0778008°N 80.5993854°W

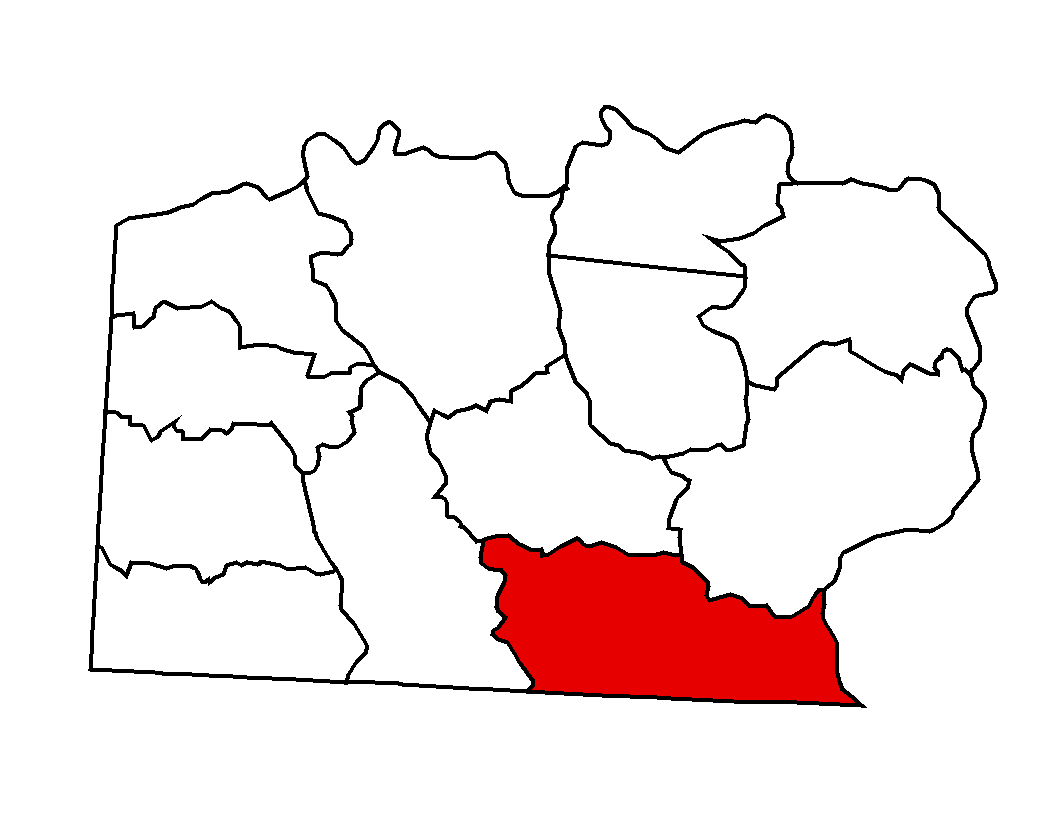
Location of South Liberty Township in Yadkin County, N.C.

South Liberty Township is one of twelve townships in Yadkin County, North Carolina, United States. The township had a population of 3,091 according to the 2000 census.

Geographically, South Liberty Township occupies 32.88 square miles (85.2 km^{2}) in southern Yadkin County. South Liberty Township's southern border is with Davie County and the eastern border is with the Yadkin River. The township includes the communities of Courtney, Huntsville and Wyo.
