= North Buck Shoals Township, Yadkin County, North Carolina =

Township in Yadkin County, North Carolina, U.S.

Coordinates: 36.1166235°N 80.8211696°W

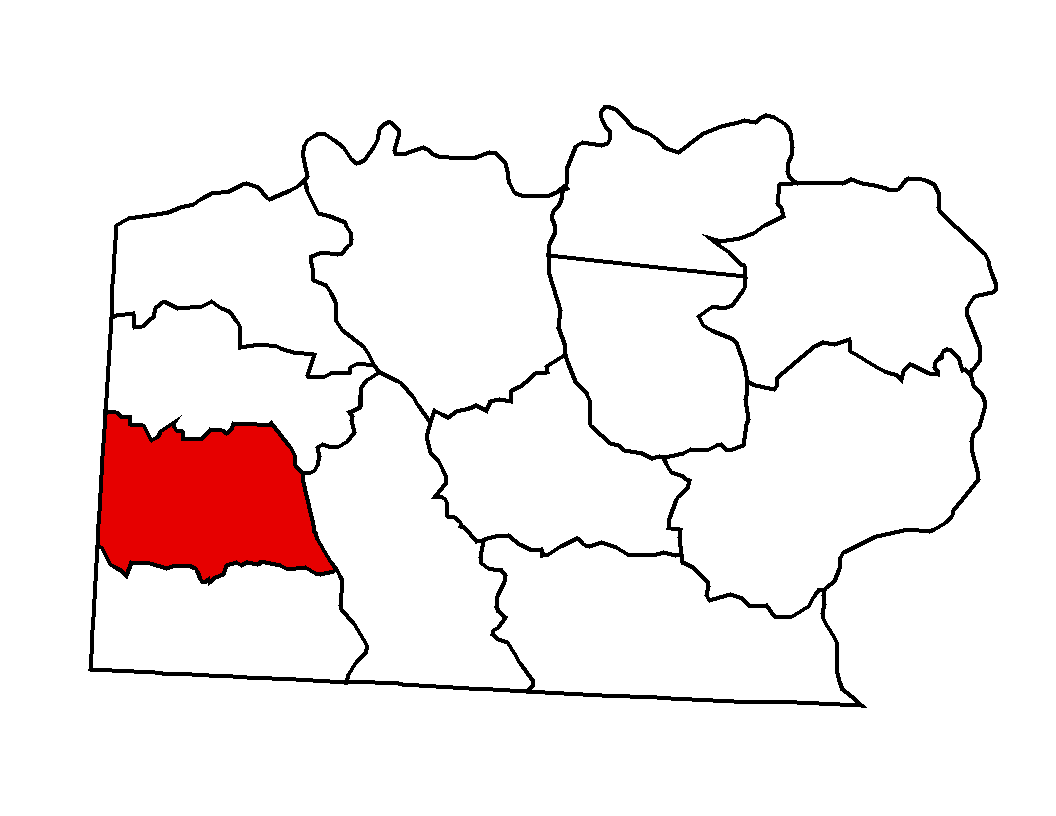
Location of North Buck Shoals Township in Yadkin County, N.C.

North Buck Shoals Township is one of twelve townships in Yadkin County, North Carolina, United States. The township had a population of 2,330 according to the 2000 census.

Geographically, North Buck Shoals Township occupies 22.48 square miles (58.2 km^{2}) in western Yadkin County. North Buck Shoals Township's western border is with Wilkes County.
