= Boonville Township, Yadkin County, North Carolina =

Township in North Carolina, United States

Coordinates: 36.225613°N 80.6992633°W

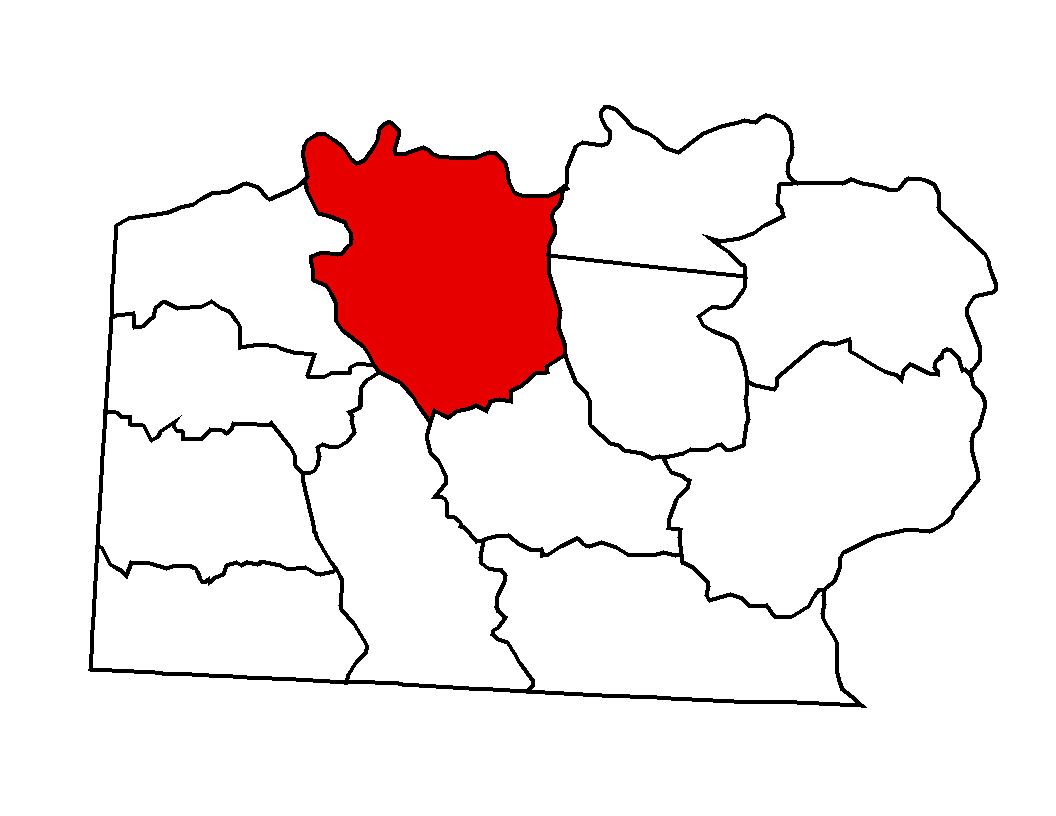
Location of Boonville Township in Yadkin County, N.C.

Boonville Township is one of twelve townships in Yadkin County, North Carolina, United States. The township had a population of 3,944, according to the 2020 census.

Geographically, Boonville Township occupies 40.75 square miles (105.5 km^{2}) in northern Yadkin County. Boonville Township's northern border is the Yadkin River. The only incorporated municipality within Boonville Township is the Town of Boonville.
