= South Fall Creek Township, Yadkin County, North Carolina =

Township in Yadkin County, North Carolina, U.S.

Coordinates: 36.185494°N 80.5993854°W

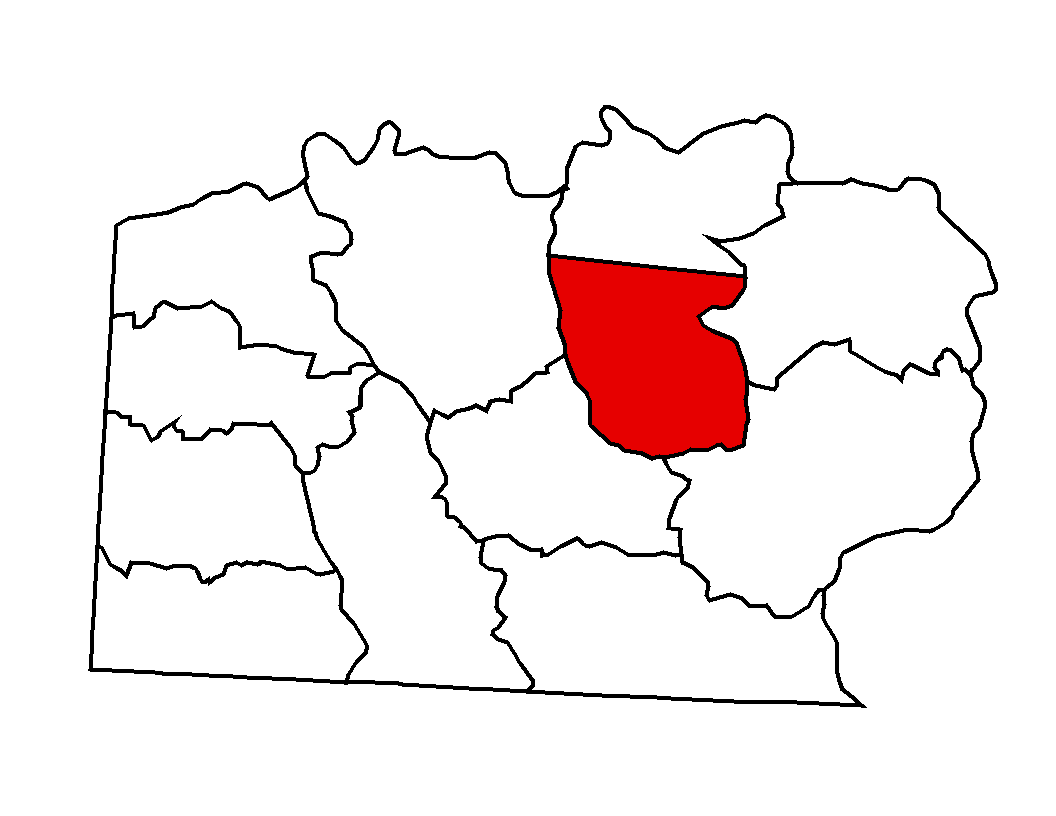
Location of South Fall Creek Township in Yadkin County, N.C.

South Fall Creek Township is one of twelve townships in Yadkin County, North Carolina, United States. The township had a population of 2,442 according to the 2000 census.

Geographically, South Fall Creek Township occupies 23.84 square miles (61.7 km^{2}) in central Yadkin County.
