= Hamptonville, North Carolina =

Hamptonville
- Unincorporated community
- Location within the state of North Carolina
- Coordinates: 36°05′54″N 80°45′37″W
- Country: United States
- State: North Carolina
- County: Yadkin
- Elevation: 1,020 ft (310 m)
- Time zone: UTC-5 (Eastern (EST))
  - Summer (DST): UTC-4 (EDT)
- GNIS feature ID: 986345

Hamptonville is an unincorporated community located in southwestern Yadkin County, North Carolina, United States. Hamptonville is named for Henry Hampton (1750–1832), a colonel in the Revolutionary Army. Hampton set aside land for a town in 1806.

As of the United States 2000 Census, the Census-designated place (CDP) of Hamptonville (ZIP code 27020) had a population of 5,901. It is a Piedmont Triad community. The community is primarily rural and agricultural with many residences scattered across the area. Denser residential and business development is centered on Brooks Crossroads, which is generally the hub of the town as it is just north of US 421 at US 21 and Old Hwy 421 and is the primary route for commuters to work in and out of town and to the elementary school.

== Demographics ==
Hamptonville's Zip Code Tabulation Area (ZCTA) has a population of about 5,901 as of the 2000 census. The population is 50.1% male and 49.9% female. About 94% of the population is white, 0.6% African-American, 0.1% American Indian, 0.2% Asian, 9.4% Hispanic, and 4.48% of another races. 0.8% of people are two or more races. There are no native Hawaiians or other Pacific Islanders.

The average household size is 2.6 people, and the average family has 3.0 people. There are 2,491 houses, with 90.9% of them occupied, 82.7% bought and 17.3% rented. There are 226 vacant housing units.

The median household income is $37,241 with 9.7% of the population (6.6% of families) living below the poverty line.

== Transportation ==
Interstate 77 and U.S. Route 421 intersect in the community. The four-lane highways provide easy access to Charlotte to the south and Winston-Salem to the east. U.S. Route 21 also passes through Hamptonville.

== Nearby cities/towns ==
Nearby towns/cities are: Yadkinville, Jonesville, Elkin, Statesville, Union Grove, Wilkesboro, Harmony and Boonville.

== Business and development ==
While the official location of Hamptonville is along US 21, south of Highway 421 near the original village and Flat Rock Church, the center of activity for Hamptonville is at Brooks Crossroads and along the Rocky Branch Rd corridor. Hamptonville has a light business development that is primarily centered on the Rocky Branch Rd corridor and along US 21 at Brooks Crossroads. These facilities include eating and dining establishments, general retail and merchandise stores, service stations, motels, and two very popular flea markets. Sedgewick Homes is a new arrival to the town and has two show homes at its facility. They also occupy a warehouse near this location. There are also other corner stores and businesses scattered further into the more rural areas of the town including small retail shops, garages, and agricultural and farm supply stores. Blue Rhino operates a propane tank regional distribution center in Hamptonville. Lydall Corporation (NYSE: LDL) operates an automotive thermal/acoustical plant a few miles west of Brooks Crossroads. These companies are two of the largest employers in the county. A location at the intersection of two heavily traveled highways has lured some commercial growth to the area. Sewer, water, and natural gas have been placed at some locations on Rocky Branch Rd with hope for additional growth.

Yadkin County officials awarded contracts in 2006 to extend water and sewer service to the area. Part of the county's $5.2 million public utilities project calls for extending water lines from nearby Jonesville along U.S. 21 south and from Yadkinville west to the I-77/U.S. 421 interchange. Further, sewer service will be offered though a line along U.S. 421 extended from west of Yadkinville to the interchange. The project is expected to start in March 2007, according to The Tribune.

The agricultural and farming industry is an anchor and big business for the Hamptonville area. Multiple farms and agricultural centers cover the area. The primary crops found are corn, tobacco, soy beans, and wheat. In addition there is an abundance of poultry and other livestock holding and processing facilities. One of the most popular attractions to the area finds its roots in agriculture. Wineries are now a popular fixture in Hamptonville.

The Hamptonville post office moved to Rocky Branch Rd 7-Eleven shopping center at 2943 Rocky Branch Road in 2007.

The West Yadkin Fire Department is located at 3205 US 21 Hwy at Brooks Crossroads. The department is the primary agency for fire, rescue, EMS, haz-mat, and other emergency and non-emergency calls in the West Yadkin Fire District, which includes most of Hamptonville. The department has around 30 members with paid staff that works Monday thru Friday 8:00 am to 5:00 pm. The department operates 8 pieces of apparatus including 2 Engines, 1 Rescue Engine, 1 Ladder, 1 Rescue, 1 Tanker, 1 Brush, and 1 Medical/QRV. The department responds to around 600 calls every year.

== Early village ==
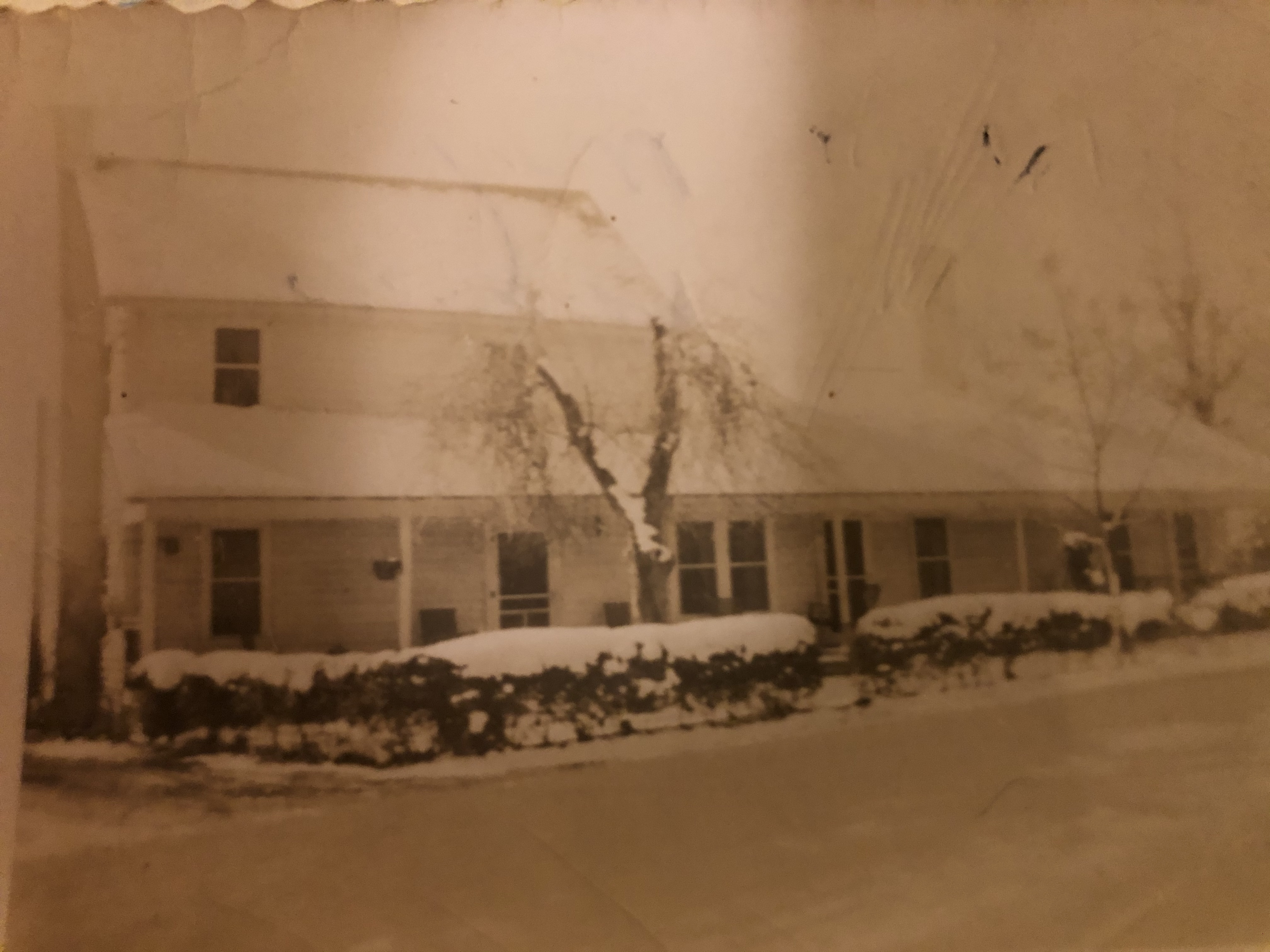
The Hampton Family House

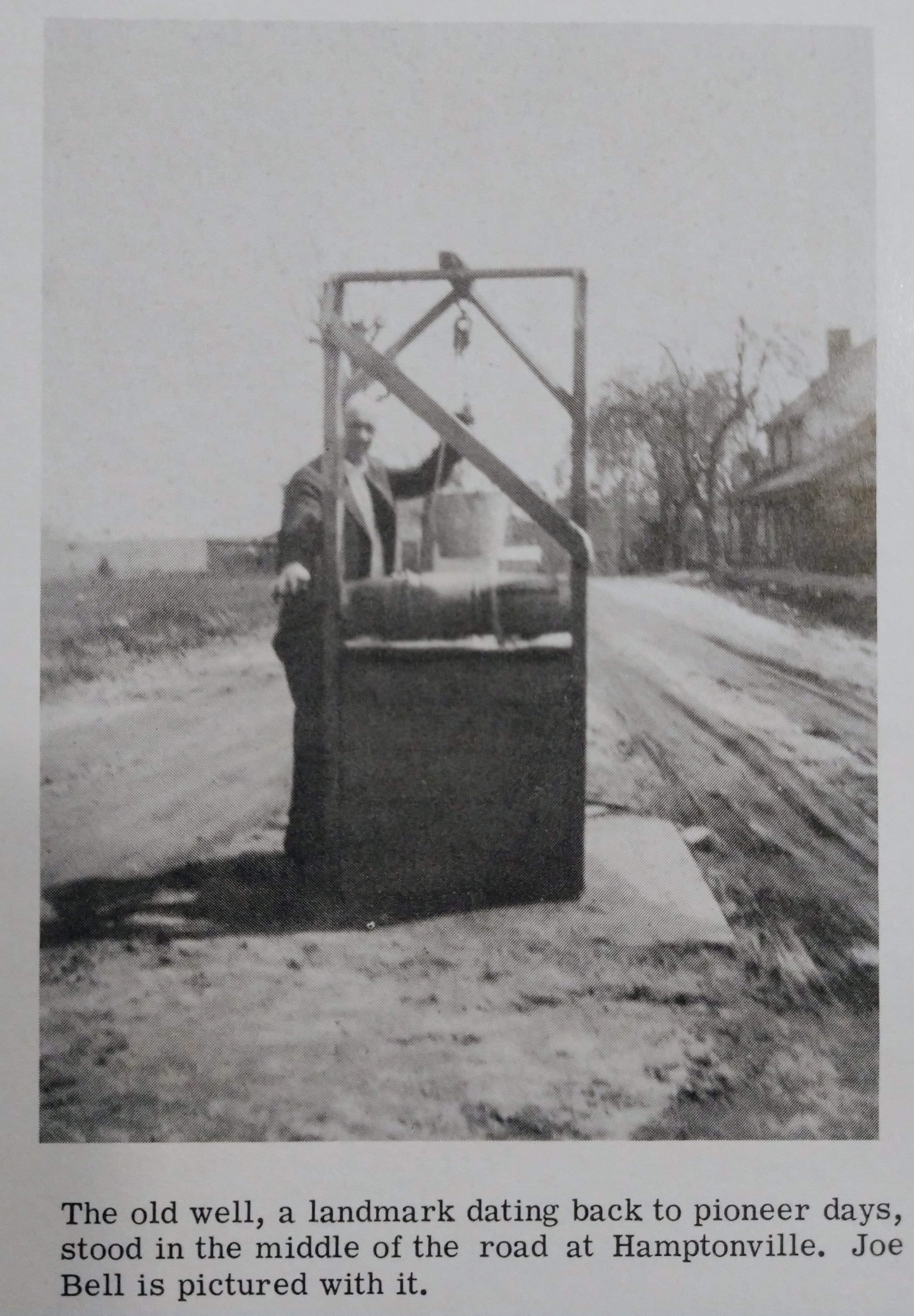
The old town well in Hamptonville. The Hampton Family House is in the background.

Hamptonville was first established in the late 18th century and chartered in 1818. The center of the village was Flat Rock Baptist Church, one of the oldest Baptist churches in western North Carolina. The church, which was first called Petty's Meeting House, can trace its history back to at least 1783. A historical marker was erected at the church, which is still active today. Up the road from the church is the Hampton Family House, the oldest house in Yadkin County. It was built circa 1757 by Thomas Hampton (1728-1796) father of Henry Hampton (1750-1832). Henry Hampton served as a Colonel in the Revolutionary War and founded the town of Hamptonville. The house passed to Henry's son, Dr. John Hampton (1795-1872). Upon the death of Dr. Hampton the house passed to his son, Civil War Colonel John A. Hampton (1836-1917). The house then passed to Colonel Hampton's daughter, Nellie Hampton Bell (1875-1950), then to her daughter, Margaret Bell Gough (1908-1983). The house, which has remained in the same family for more than 250 years, is currently owned and occupied by Margaret Bell Gough's grandson Adam Charles Pardue, the 8th generation of the same family to own and occupy the house.

At one time, the town well was in the middle of the street, but it was paved over when U.S. 21 was built in the area in 1940. The postal area of Hamptonville includes a number of historic communities, including Brooks Crossroads, Buck Shoals, Windsors Crossroads and part of Lone Hickory.

== Attractions ==
- The Windsor’s Crossroads Community Building, a two-story schoolhouse constructed about 1915, is at the intersection of Buck Shoals and Windsor Roads near the Iredell County line. The building has hosted an old-time music jam on Friday nights since 1990.
- The area is part of the Yadkin Valley wine region. Four vineyards located within a five-mile radius make up the Swan Creek Wine Trail in the area: Buck Shoals, Raffaldini, Windy Gap and Laurel Gray wines.
- It is not unusual to spot Amish buggies in the community. A small Amish community settled in the area, beginning in the 1980s. The Shiloh General Store, 5520 St. Paul Church Road, is an Amish-run store that sells baked goods, cheeses, spices and hand-crafted children's toys and furniture.
- Carolina Skydive is a skydiving facility located at Swan Creek Airport on Swan Creek Rd near Howell School Rd or near the town of Jonesville about 10 minutes from Hamptonville.
- There are two very popular Flea Markets on Rocky Branch Rd that on the weekends have several vendors, stands, and shops open. Locals as well as visitors frequent these facilities and often find it challenging to find a parking spot.

== Public schools ==
Most students in the area attend West Yadkin Elementary School, a kindergarten through fifth-grade public community school on Old U.S. Highway 421. The school opened in 1935 as a high school, but became an elementary-only school after consolidation in 1967. The school was mostly rebuilt after a 1986 countywide bond referendum.

West Yadkin is a focal point for the community and one of the largest schools in Yadkin, with about 800 students.

West Yadkin is one of three feeder schools for Starmount High School, which is located north of the Hamptonville area on Longtown Road.

A new middle school named Starmount Middle School opened in Fall 2009 for 6-8 grade students. The school is located on Longtown Rd beside Starmount High School.

== Notable people ==
- Sir Leo Arnaud (1904–1991), French-born composer of Bugler's Dream, which has been used as the Olympics theme on U.S. television since 1968.
- Alfred "Teen" Blackburn, one of the last surviving American slaves with a clear recollection of slavery as an adult.
- William H. H. Cowles, a four-term United States congressman and colonel in the 1st Regiment of North Carolina Cavalry during the Civil War
- Kathy Fleming, Miss North Carolina 1977
- State Rep. George M. Holmes
- Jeanette W. Hyde, the U.S. ambassador to Antigua and Barbuda, Barbados, Dominica, Grenada, Saint Lucia, Saint Kitts and Nevis, Saint Vincent and the Grenadines, 1994-1997.
- Junior Johnson, NASCAR pioneer, Junior Johnson lived in a large mansion he built in Hamptonville but he was born in neighboring Wilkes County.
