= Yadkin County, North Carolina =

County in North Carolina, United States

- County
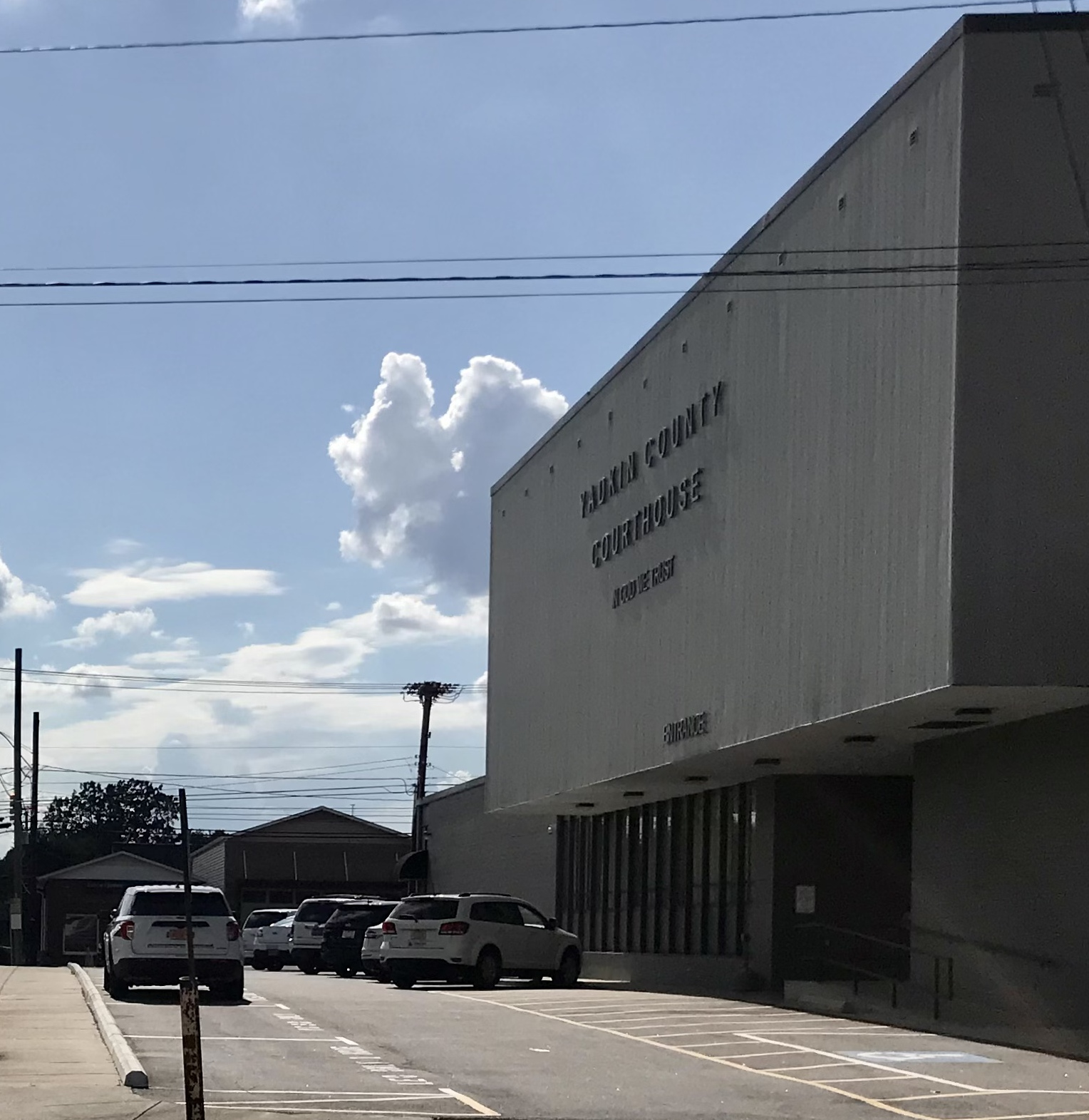
- Yadkin County Courthouse

- Flag Seal Logo
- Motto: "Come for a visit, stay for a lifetime"
- Location within the U.S. state of North Carolina
- Coordinates: 36.16°N 80.67°W
- Country: United States
- State: North Carolina
- Founded: 1850
- Named for: Yadkin River
- Seat: Yadkinville
- Largest community: Yadkinville

Area
  - Total: 337.71 sq mi (874.7 km^{2})
  - Land: 334.94 sq mi (867.5 km^{2})
  - Water: 2.77 sq mi (7.2 km^{2}) 0.82%

Population (2020)
  - Total: 37,214
  - Estimate (2025): 38,325 ▲
  - Density: 111.11/sq mi (42.90/km^{2})
- Time zone: UTC−5 (Eastern)
  - Summer (DST): UTC−4 (EDT)
- Congressional district: 10th
- Website: www.yadkincountync.gov

Yadkin County is a county located in the U.S. state of North Carolina. The population was 37,214 at the 2020 census. Its county seat is Yadkinville. Yadkin County is included in the Winston-Salem, NC Metropolitan Statistical Area, which is also included in the Greensboro–Winston-Salem–High Point, NC Combined Statistical Area.

== History ==
Present-day Yadkin County was home to the Tutelo and Saponi Indian tribes. European-descent settlers moved into the area around 1748. Though in the western Piedmont region of the state, the residents of the eventual county developed more economic, political, and cultural similarities with their contemporaries in the mountains to the west than to many of their peers in other sections of the Piedmont or those in the eastern part of North Carolina. Over the following decades the county developed as a society mostly made up of smallholding white farmers, though Yadkin was also home to several large landowners and slaveholders (and their slaves), some working professionals, and a few free blacks and Native Americans.

The land eventually comprising Yadkin County was first politically organized under the jurisdiction of Anson County. In 1750, it was placed in the new jurisdiction of Rowan County, and in 1770 was made a part of Surry County. In 1850, the North Carolina General Assembly split off the portion of Surry south of the Yadkin River to create Yadkin County to satisfy local political divisions. At the time of its creation, the county had 9,808 residents, of whom 8,664 were white, 86 were free persons of color, and 1,508 were enslaved blacks. The town of Wilson was established to serve as the county seat. In 1852, the town's name was changed to Yadkinville.

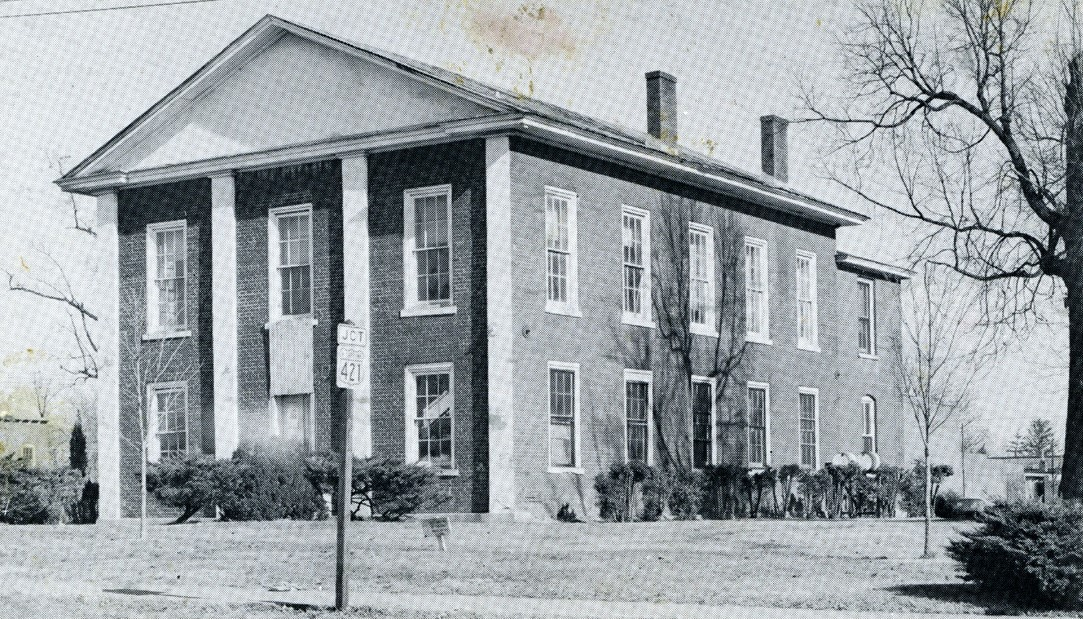
The first Yadkin County Courthouse, built 1851

From 1850 to 1860, the county experienced economic and demographic growth. By the end of the decade, though it was still mostly rural and dominated by farming, the county hosted several grist mills, stores, distilleries, and a tobacco factory. Politically, the county was home to many Whigs and its resident favored John Bell of the Constitutional Union Party during the 1860 United States presidential election. Following the election of Republican Abraham Lincoln as president, leaders of the state of North Carolina considered whether or not to secede in 1861 and join the nascent Confederate States of America. Yadkin voters overwhelmingly rejected a vote to hold a state convention to consider secession. Following Lincoln's call for Southern volunteers to suppress rebellion in South Carolina, a state convention was held and North Carolina seceded from the United States.

Men from Yadkin County served during the ensuing American Civil War in the Confederate States Army. Many would desert and return home to assist their families in key agricultural activities before going back into service. North Carolina's declaration of a draft proved unpopular in the county; some locals avoided conscription into the army due to pro-Union sentiments, or, in the case of local Quakers, due to religious objections to war and slavery. Some draft dodgers hid in woods or caves, while others fled west to pro-Union communities in the mountains. In February 1863, two Confederate officials and two draft evaders were killed in an exchange of gunfire after a militia attempted to arrest a group of evaders at a school house.

After the war, Yadkin became politically dominated by the Republican Party, with many locals being attracted to it for its opposition to slavery, support for central national government, and push for disbursing money to fund infrastructure improvements. Yadkin's support for the Republican Party persisted along with some of its neighboring counties after the state largely fell under the Democratic Party's domination in the 1870s. Portions of Yadkin County were annexed to Forsyth County in 1911 and 1927. The county garnered its first paved highways in the 1920s.

By the mid-20th century, Yadkin's economy was largely rooted in tobacco farming. Many residents not employed by the agricultural industry commuted to Winston-Salem in Forsyth County for work. In 1971, Unifi Manufacturing established its first textile facility in Yadkin County. As the company expanded over the following decades, it became the leading industrial employer the county and provided additional economic support through tax revenue and philanthropy to the area. National declines in the textiles industry in the late 1990s and early 2000s led the company to shrink its local presence.

== Geography ==
Interactive map of Yadkin County

According to the U.S. Census Bureau, the county has a total area of 337.71 square miles (874.7 km^{2}), of which 334.94 square miles (867.5 km^{2}) is land and 2.77 square miles (7.2 km^{2}) (0.82%) is water. It is bordered by Surry, Forsyth, Davie, Iredell, and Wilkes counties.

Yadkin County is located in the Piedmont region of North Carolina and in the northwestern portion of state, close to the Blue Ridge Mountains. The western portions of the county are hillier than the eastern portions, with part of the Brushy Mountains crossing into the northwestern section. It is within the Yadkin-Pee Dee River Basin, with the Yadkin River forming its northern and eastern borders.

=== State and local protected areas ===
- Historic Richmond Hill Nature Park
- Yadkinville Community Park

=== Major water bodies ===
- Beaverdam Creek
- Deep Creek
- Dobbins Creek
- Forbush Creek
- Harmon Creek
- Little Forbush Creek
- Logan Creek
- Miller Creek
- North Deep Creek
- North Little Hunting Creek
- South Deep Creek
- South Yadkin River
- Turner Creek
- Yadkin River

== Demographics ==
Historical population
Census	Pop.	Note	%±
1860	10,714		—
1870	10,697		−0.2%
1880	12,420		16.1%
1890	13,790		11.0%
1900	14,083		2.1%
1910	15,428		9.6%
1920	16,391		6.2%
1930	18,010		9.9%
1940	20,657		14.7%
1950	22,133		7.1%
1960	22,804		3.0%
1970	24,599		7.9%
1980	28,439		15.6%
1990	30,488		7.2%
2000	36,348		19.2%
2010	38,406		5.7%
2020	37,214		−3.1%
2025 (est.)	38,325	▲	3.0%
U.S. Decennial Census; 1790–1960 1900–1990; 1990–2000 2010 2020

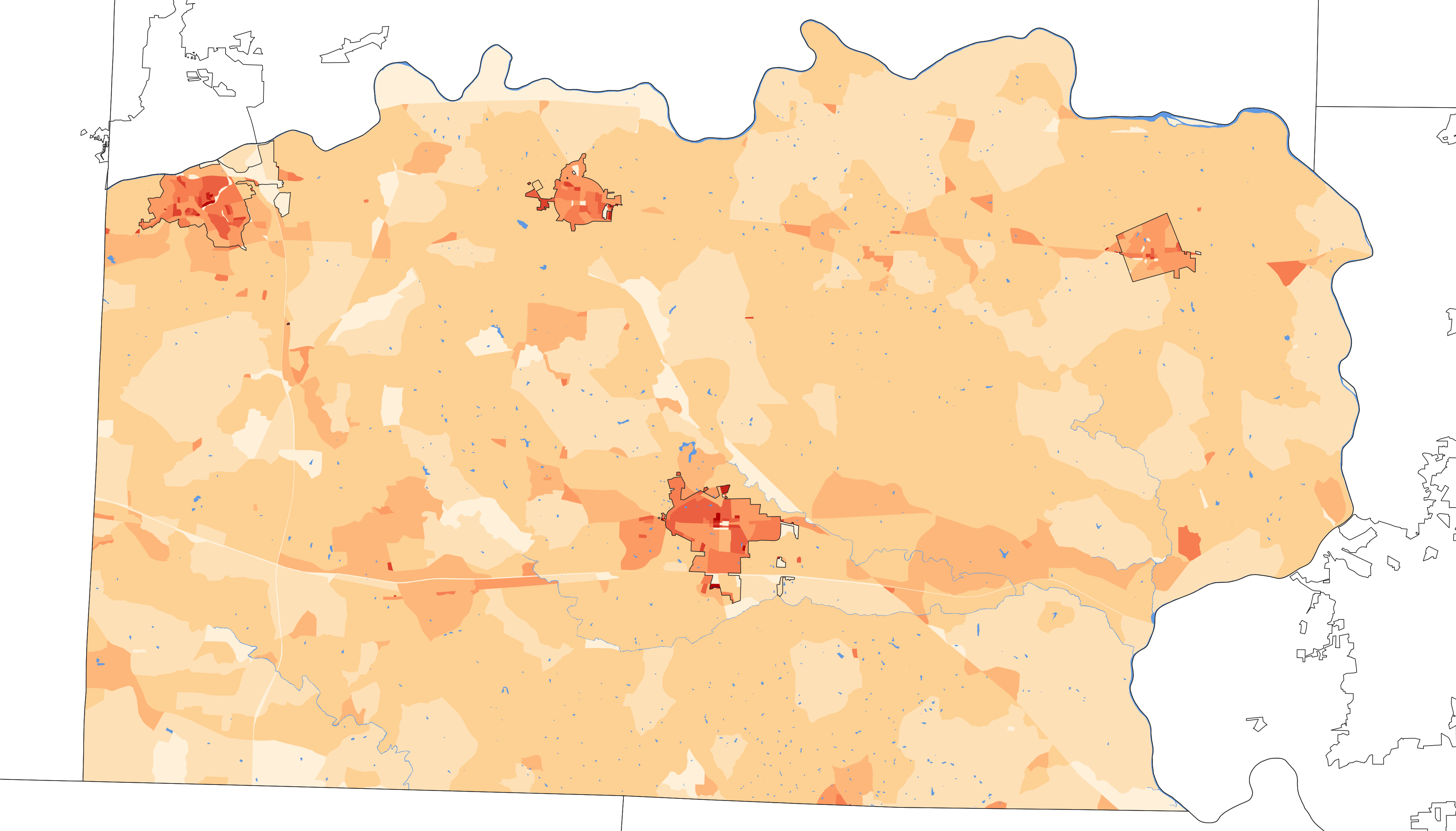
2020 population density of Yadkin County NC by census block

=== Racial and ethnic composition ===
Yadkin County, North Carolina – Racial and ethnic composition Note: the US Census treats Hispanic/Latino as an ethnic category. This table excludes Latinos from the racial categories and assigns them to a separate category. Hispanics/Latinos may be of any race.
Race / Ethnicity (NH = Non-Hispanic)	Pop 1980	Pop 1990	Pop 2000	Pop 2010	Pop 2020	% 1980	% 1990	% 2000	% 2010	% 2020
White alone (NH)	26,826	28,755	32,446	33,022	30,357	94.33%	94.32%	89.26%	85.98%	81.57%
Black or African American alone (NH)	1,335	1,294	1,219	1,165	1,071	4.69%	4.24%	3.35%	3.03%	2.88%
Native American or Alaska Native alone (NH)	13	22	55	66	63	0.05%	0.07%	0.15%	0.17%	0.17%
Asian alone (NH)	19	26	61	71	142	0.07%	0.09%	0.17%	0.18%	0.38%
Native Hawaiian or Pacific Islander alone (NH)	x	x	5	5	0	x	x	0.01%	0.01%	0.00%
Other race alone (NH)	1	3	13	11	87	0.00%	0.01%	0.04%	0.03%	0.23%
Mixed race or Multiracial (NH)	x	x	192	317	1,112	x	x	0.53%	0.83%	2.99%
Hispanic or Latino (any race)	245	388	2,357	3,749	4,382	0.86%	1.27%	6.48%	9.76%	11.78%
Total	28,439	30,488	36,348	38,406	37,214	100.00%	100.00%	100.00%	100.00%	100.00%

=== 2020 census ===
As of the 2020 census, there were 37,214 people, 15,225 households, and 10,789 families residing in the county.

The median age was 44.8 years. 20.8% of residents were under the age of 18 and 20.7% of residents were 65 years of age or older. For every 100 females there were 98.5 males, and for every 100 females age 18 and over there were 95.6 males age 18 and over.

The racial makeup of the county was 82.9% White, 3.1% Black or African American, 0.5% American Indian and Alaska Native, 0.4% Asian, <0.1% Native Hawaiian and Pacific Islander, 7.7% from some other race, and 5.5% from two or more races. Hispanic or Latino residents of any race comprised 11.8% of the population.

<0.1% of residents lived in urban areas, while 100.0% lived in rural areas.

There were 15,225 households in the county, of which 27.9% had children under the age of 18 living in them. Of all households, 51.9% were married-couple households, 17.7% were households with a male householder and no spouse or partner present, and 25.3% were households with a female householder and no spouse or partner present. About 27.7% of all households were made up of individuals and 14.0% had someone living alone who was 65 years of age or older.

There were 16,946 housing units, of which 10.2% were vacant. Among occupied housing units, 75.2% were owner-occupied and 24.8% were renter-occupied. The homeowner vacancy rate was 0.9% and the rental vacancy rate was 8.0%.

=== 2000 census ===
At the 2000 census, there were 36,348 people, 14,505 households, and 10,588 families residing in the county. The population density was 108 people per square mile (42 people/km^{2}). There were 15,821 housing units at an average density of 47 units per square mile (18 units/km^{2}). The racial makeup of the county was 92.54% White, 3.43% Black or African American, 0.16% Native American, 0.17% Asian, 0.02% Pacific Islander, 2.91% from other races, and 0.77% from two or more races. 6.48% of the population were Hispanic or Latino of any race.

There were 14,505 households, out of which 32.10% had children under the age of 18 living with them, 60.00% were married couples living together, 9.00% had a female householder with no husband present, and 27.00% were non-families. 24.00% of all households were made up of individuals, and 10.50% had someone living alone who was 65 years of age or older. The average household size was 2.47 and the average family size was 2.92.

In the county, the population was spread out, with 24.00% under the age of 18, 7.50% from 18 to 24, 30.20% from 25 to 44, 24.20% from 45 to 64, and 14.20% who were 65 years of age or older. The median age was 38 years. For every 100 females there were 96.40 males. For every 100 females age 18 and over, there were 93.60 males.

The median income for a household in the county was $36,660, and the median income for a family was $43,758. Males had a median income of $29,589 versus $22,599 for females. The per capita income for the county was $18,576. About 7.10% of families and 10.00% of the population were below the poverty line, including 10.90% of those under age 18 and 17.40% of those age 65 or over.

== Law and government ==
=== Government ===
Yadkin County is governed by a five-member board of commissioners who are elected at-large to serve staggered two- and four-year terms. Elections are held in November of even-numbered years. The commissioners appoint a county manager, who serves as the head administrator of the county government.

Yadkin County is a member of the Northwest Piedmont Council of Governments, a regional planning association. It is located entirely in the North Carolina Senate's 36th district, the North Carolina House of Representatives' 77th district, and North Carolina's 5th congressional district.

Yadkin County lies within the bounds of North Carolina's 34th Prosecutorial District, the 23rd Superior Court District, and the 23rd District Court District.

=== Politics ===
United States presidential election results for Yadkin County, North Carolina
Year	Republican		Democratic		Third party(ies)	
Year	No.	%	No.	%	No.	%
1912	791	37.61%	713	33.90%	599	28.48%
1916	1,721	66.19%	879	33.81%	0	0.00%
1920	3,301	70.97%	1,350	29.03%	0	0.00%
1924	2,889	67.48%	1,381	32.26%	11	0.26%
1928	3,878	83.60%	761	16.40%	0	0.00%
1932	3,422	54.82%	2,789	44.68%	31	0.50%
1936	4,200	56.69%	3,209	43.31%	0	0.00%
1940	4,077	52.69%	3,660	47.31%	0	0.00%
1944	4,392	64.00%	2,470	36.00%	0	0.00%
1948	3,631	61.19%	2,083	35.10%	220	3.71%
1952	5,540	66.54%	2,786	33.46%	0	0.00%
1956	5,469	69.85%	2,361	30.15%	0	0.00%
1960	7,268	72.30%	2,785	27.70%	0	0.00%
1964	5,860	61.70%	3,638	38.30%	0	0.00%
1968	5,885	60.51%	1,443	14.84%	2,397	24.65%
1972	6,824	79.16%	1,592	18.47%	205	2.38%
1976	5,916	56.52%	4,497	42.96%	55	0.53%
1980	7,530	65.08%	3,850	33.28%	190	1.64%
1984	8,976	74.37%	3,075	25.48%	19	0.16%
1988	7,918	71.10%	3,195	28.69%	24	0.22%
1992	7,311	56.34%	3,913	30.15%	1,753	13.51%
1996	8,439	68.54%	2,927	23.77%	947	7.69%
2000	10,435	76.27%	3,127	22.85%	120	0.88%
2004	11,816	77.16%	3,451	22.54%	46	0.30%
2008	12,409	72.37%	4,527	26.40%	211	1.23%
2012	12,578	74.81%	3,957	23.54%	278	1.65%
2016	13,880	78.76%	3,160	17.93%	584	3.31%
2020	15,933	79.97%	3,763	18.89%	227	1.14%
2024	16,439	80.60%	3,739	18.33%	219	1.07%

Yadkin County began supporting the Republican Party in the aftermath of the American Civil War. Like some its neighboring counties, Yadkin's support for Republicans continued while the state was politically dominated by Democrats from the 1870s into the latter part of the 20th century. Republicans won every county election in the 20th century except in 1958, when Democrats won the sheriff's office and all seats on the county commission in response to the incumbent commissioners' decision to demolish the county's antebellum courthouse and replace it with one the public viewed as unsightly. Yadkin's support for the Republican Party carried into the 21st century with the party's rebound across the state. As of March 2022, the county was home to approximately 25,000 registered voters, of whom 56.9 percent were registered Republicans and 13.4 percent were registered Democrats.

== Economy ==
Unifi Manufacturing, a textile company, is the largest private employer in Yadkin County and operates a large recycled plastics polymer plant in Yadkinville.

== Transportation ==
=== Major highways ===
- I-77
- Future I-685
- US 21
- US 21 Bus.
- US 421
- US 601
- NC 67

Two major four-lane highways serve Yadkin County. Interstate 77 runs north to south in the western part of the county and U.S. Highway 421 runs east to west. The two highways intersect near Hamptonville. The county also is served by U.S. Highway 21, which runs mostly parallel with I-77, and U.S. Highway 601, which runs through Yadkinville and Boonville. North Carolina Highway 67 is another popular artery that links the northern part of the county with Jonesville-Elkin and Winston-Salem.

=== Airports ===
Commercial flights are available through Piedmont Triad International Airport and Charlotte Douglas International Airport. Two private airports are located in the county, Swan Creek near Jonesville and Lone Hickory near Yadkinville. One additional airport is located in Boonville on Baptist Church Road. It recently housed NC Baptist Hospital's AirCare II during a transitional period.

=== Public transportation ===
Beginning in 2006, the Piedmont Authority for Regional Transportation (PART) began offering limited bus service between Boone, North Carolina and Greensboro, North Carolina as part of its US 421 Mountaineer Express. The buses make stops east and west in Yadkinville.

Yadkin Valley Economic Development District Inc. (YVEDDI), a community action agency based in Boonville, operates a multi-county rural public transportation system.

== Education ==
Yadkin County has three high schools, Forbush, Starmount, and the Yadkin Early College.

The Yadkin Early College is a five-year program where high school and college courses are offered on the Yadkin campus of Surry Community College. Students get the opportunity to earn their high school diploma and an associate degree in nursing, criminal justice, or a transfer degree to a four-year university.

The high schools are fed by eight elementary schools, which teach kindergarten through sixth grades. The eight elementary schools are Boonville, Courtney, East Bend, Fall Creek, Forbush, Jonesville, West Yadkin and Yadkinville.

The school system also operates Yadkin Success Academy, an alternative learning center on Old U.S. 421 in Yadkinville.

Yadkin County opened two new middle schools in 2009. Starmount Middle School opened in August and serves seventh and eighth grade students from Jonesville, Boonville, and West Yadkin Elementary Schools. Forbush Middle opened in November and serves East Bend, Forbush Elementary, Fall Creek, Courtney, and Yadkinville Schools. Both campuses are adjacent to the high schools.

Surry Community College offers courses through its Yadkin Campus at 4649 U.S. Highway 601 North near Yadkinville.

== Media ==
=== Print ===
Yadkin County is covered by two community newspapers, The Yadkin Ripple and The Tribune of Elkin. The Winston-Salem Journal, a larger daily paper, also covers the county. Yadkin Valley Living, a bimonthly lifestyles publication, is based in East Bend.

=== Broadcast ===
WSGH, an AM Spanish contemporary station, broadcasts from eastern Yadkin County.

Yadkin County is part of the Piedmont Triad radio and television market but many broadcasts from the Charlotte market also can be received.

== Yadkin Valley wine region ==
All of Yadkin County is included in the Yadkin Valley AVA, an American Viticultural Area recognized by the United States government as a unique grape-growing region. Wines made from grapes grown in this area may use the appellation "Yadkin Valley" on the label. Yadkin County is also home to the second North Carolina AVA, the Swan Creek Wine Region.

== Communities ==
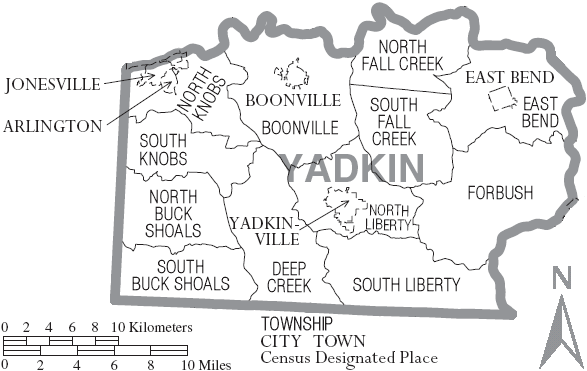
Map of Yadkin County with municipal and township labels

=== Towns ===
- Boonville
- East Bend
- Jonesville
- Yadkinville (county seat and largest community)

=== Townships ===
- Boonville
- Deep Creek
- East Bend
- Forbush
- North Buck Shoals
- North Fall Creek
- North Knobs
- North Liberty
- South Buck Shoals
- South Fall Creek
- South Knobs
- South Liberty

=== Census-designated place ===
- Smithtown

=== Unincorporated communities ===
- Barney Hill
- Branon
- Buck Shoals
- Center
- Brooks Crossroads
- Courtney
- Enon
- Flint Hill
- Footville
- Forbush
- Hamptonville
- Huntsville
- Lone Hickory
- Longtown
- Marler
- Richmond Hill
- Swan Creek
- Union Hill
- Windsor's Crossroads
- Wyo

=== Former towns ===
These towns were incorporated at one time:

- Arlington, merged with Jonesville in 2001
- Hamptonville, chartered in 1818
- Huntsville, incorporated in 1792
- Shore, incorporated from 1903 to 1911
- Smithtown, incorporated in 1924

== Notable people ==
- Leo Arnaud, French-born film composer
- Thomas Lanier Clingman, U.S. senator and representative and Confederate brigadier general
- William "Mo" Cowan, U.S. senator for Massachusetts in 2013
- William Wade Hampton (1858–1930), state senator and state representative
- Mamrie Hart, YouTube celebrity
- Dickie Hemric, basketball star for Wake Forest and the Boston Celtics
- Richmond Mumford Pearson, North Carolina Supreme Court chief justice, and his son, Richmond Pearson, a diplomat and U.S. representative
- Richard Clauselle Puryear, U.S. congressman
- Ernie Shore, a Major League baseball pitcher and former Forsyth County sheriff
- Junior Johnson (Robert Glenn), NASCAR Hall of Fame driver and champion team owner

== See also ==
- List of counties in North Carolina
- National Register of Historic Places listings in Yadkin County, North Carolina

== Works cited ==
- Auman, William T. (2014). Civil War in the North Carolina Quaker Belt: The Confederate Campaign Against Peace Agitators, Deserters and Draft Dodgers. McFarland. ISBN 9781476612997.
- Casstevens, Frances H. (2015). The Civil War and Yadkin County, North Carolina. McFarland. ISBN 9781476604039.
- Casstevens, Frances H. (2006). Tales from the North and the South: Twenty-Four Remarkable People and Events of the Civil War. McFarland. ISBN 9780786428700.
- Casstevens, Frances H. (1996). Yadkin County: The First One Hundred Years. Arcadia Publishing. ISBN 9780738568744.
- Corbitt, David Leroy (2000). The formation of the North Carolina counties, 1663-1943 (reprint ed.). Raleigh: North Carolina Division of Archives and History. OCLC 46398241.
- Hobson, Fred (2006). Off the Rim: Basketball and Other Religions in a Carolina Childhood. University of Missouri Press. ISBN 9780826265258.
