= Lone Hickory, North Carolina =

Lone Hickory
- Unincorporated community
- Location within the state of North Carolina
- Coordinates: 36°03′28″N 80°43′01″W
- Country: United States
- State: North Carolina
- County: Yadkin
- Elevation: 1,053 ft (321 m)
- Time zone: UTC-5 (Eastern (EST))
  - Summer (DST): UTC-4 (EDT)
- GNIS feature ID: 988869

Lone Hickory is an unincorporated community in southern Yadkin County, North Carolina, United States, west of Courtney. It is located on Lone Hickory road, approximately one mile southeast of the road's western terminus at U.S. Route 21.
