= Forbush Township, Yadkin County, North Carolina =

Township in Yadkin County, North Carolina, U.S.

Coordinates: 36.1353924°N 80.5105028°W

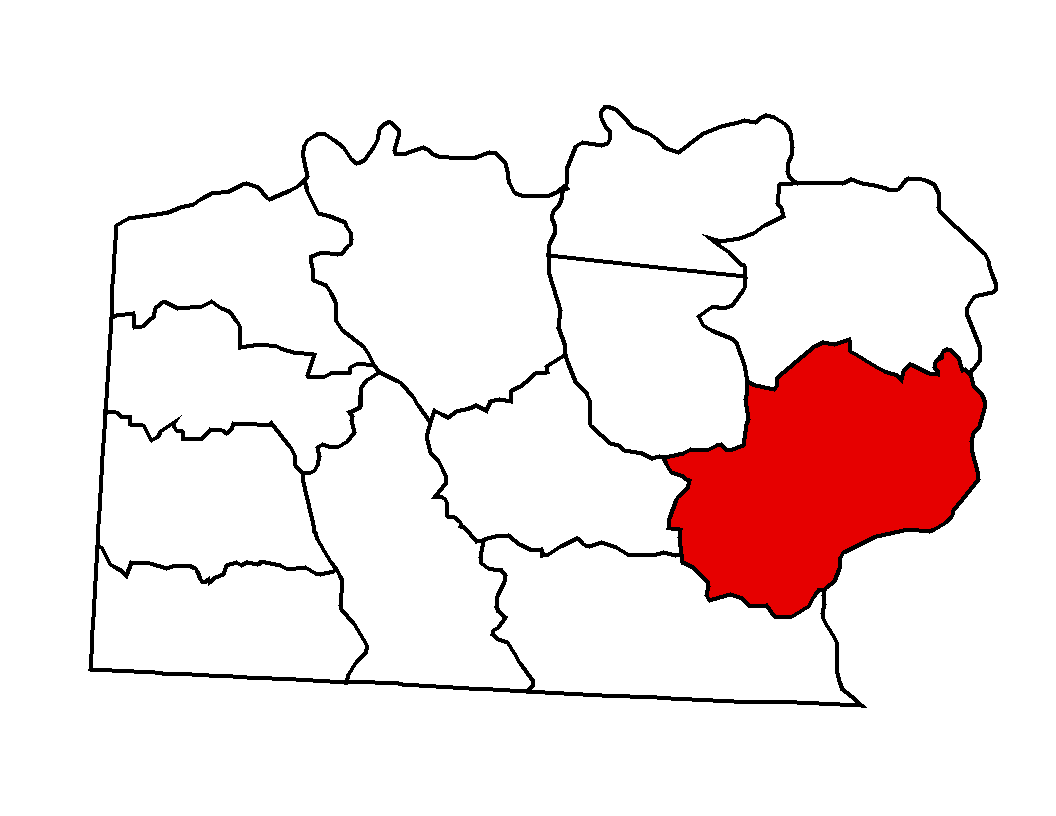
Location of Forbush Township in Yadkin County, N.C.

Forbush Township is one of twelve townships in Yadkin County, North Carolina, United States. The township had a population of 3,695 according to the 2000 census.

Geographically, Forbush Township occupies 42.58 square miles (110.3 km^{2}) in eastern Yadkin County. Forbush Township's eastern border is the Yadkin River. The township includes the unincorporated communities of Forbush and Enon. Forbush encompasses both East Bend (27018) and Yadkinville (27055) zip codes. The Elementary, Middle School, and High School are all located within the township; all are named after the township, Forbush. The township also has a Baptist church, named Forbush Baptist.
