= North Fall Creek Township, Yadkin County, North Carolina =

Township in Yadkin County, North Carolina, U.S.

Coordinates: 36.2500383°N 80.5993854°W

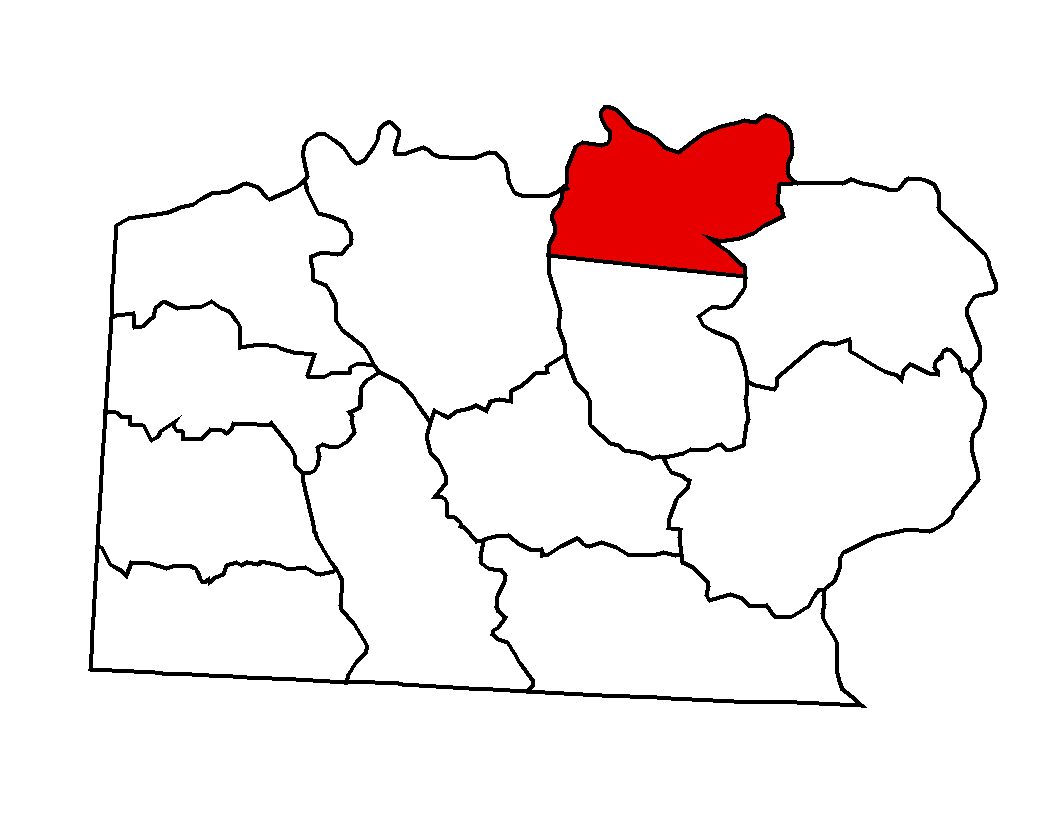
Location of North Fall Creek Township in Yadkin County, N.C.

North Fall Creek Township is one of twelve townships in Yadkin County, North Carolina, United States. The township had a population of 1,493 according to the 2020 census.

Geographically, North Fall Creek Township occupies 21.9 square miles (57 km^{2}) in northern Yadkin County. North Fall Creek Township's northern border is the Yadkin River.
