= Forbush, North Carolina =

Forbush
- Unincorporated community
- Location within the state of North Carolina
- Coordinates: 36°11′53″N 80°34′27″W
- Country: United States
- State: North Carolina
- County: Yadkin
- Elevation: 1,024 ft (312 m)
- Time zone: UTC-5 (Eastern (EST))
  - Summer (DST): UTC-4 (EDT)
- GNIS feature ID: 1006207

Forbush is an unincorporated community in central Yadkin County, North Carolina, United States. The community is named for George Forbush, one of the earliest European settlers in Northwestern North Carolina. Forbush, who moved south from Maryland, Pennsylvania and Virginia, settled on the west bank of the Yadkin River about two miles north of Shallow Ford in 1748.

The community shares its name with the Forbush Township.
