= Hail to California =

Song
- Written: 1907
- Genre: Alma mater
- Songwriter: Clinton Morse

Audio sample
- Sung by the DeCadence choral ensemble: file; help

"Hail to California" is an alma mater song used throughout the University of California system. It is traditionally played before every basketball home game, is a common song at California Golden Bears football games, and is sung at convocations and matriculations at UC Berkeley, UC Santa Barbara, and UC Davis.

== Lyrics ==
Hail to California
Alma Mater dear
Sing the joyful chorus
Sound it far and near
Rallying round her banner
We will never fail
California, Alma Mater
Hail! Hail! Hail!

Hail to California
Queen in whom we're blest
Spreading light and goodness
Over all the West
Fighting 'neath her standard
We shall sure prevail
California, Alma Mater
Hail! Hail! Hail!
