= Deep Creek Township, Yadkin County, North Carolina =

Township in Yadkin County, North Carolina, U.S.

Coordinates: 36.1097702°N 80.7325287°W

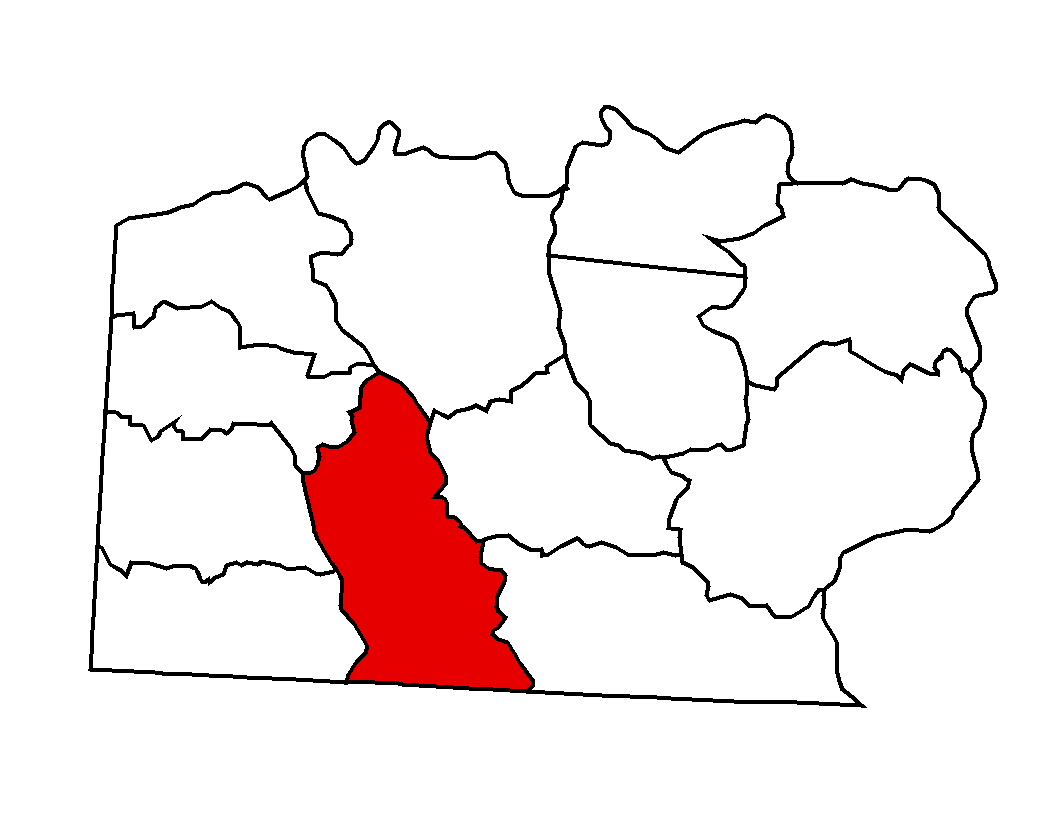
Location of Deep Creek Township in Yadkin County, N.C.

Deep Creek Township is one of twelve townships in Yadkin County, North Carolina, United States. The township had a population of 2,838, according to the 2000 census.

Geographically, Deep Creek Township occupies 31.35 square miles (81.2 km^{2}) in central and southern Yadkin County. Deep Creek Township's southern border is with Iredell County.
