= Boonville, North Carolina =

- Town
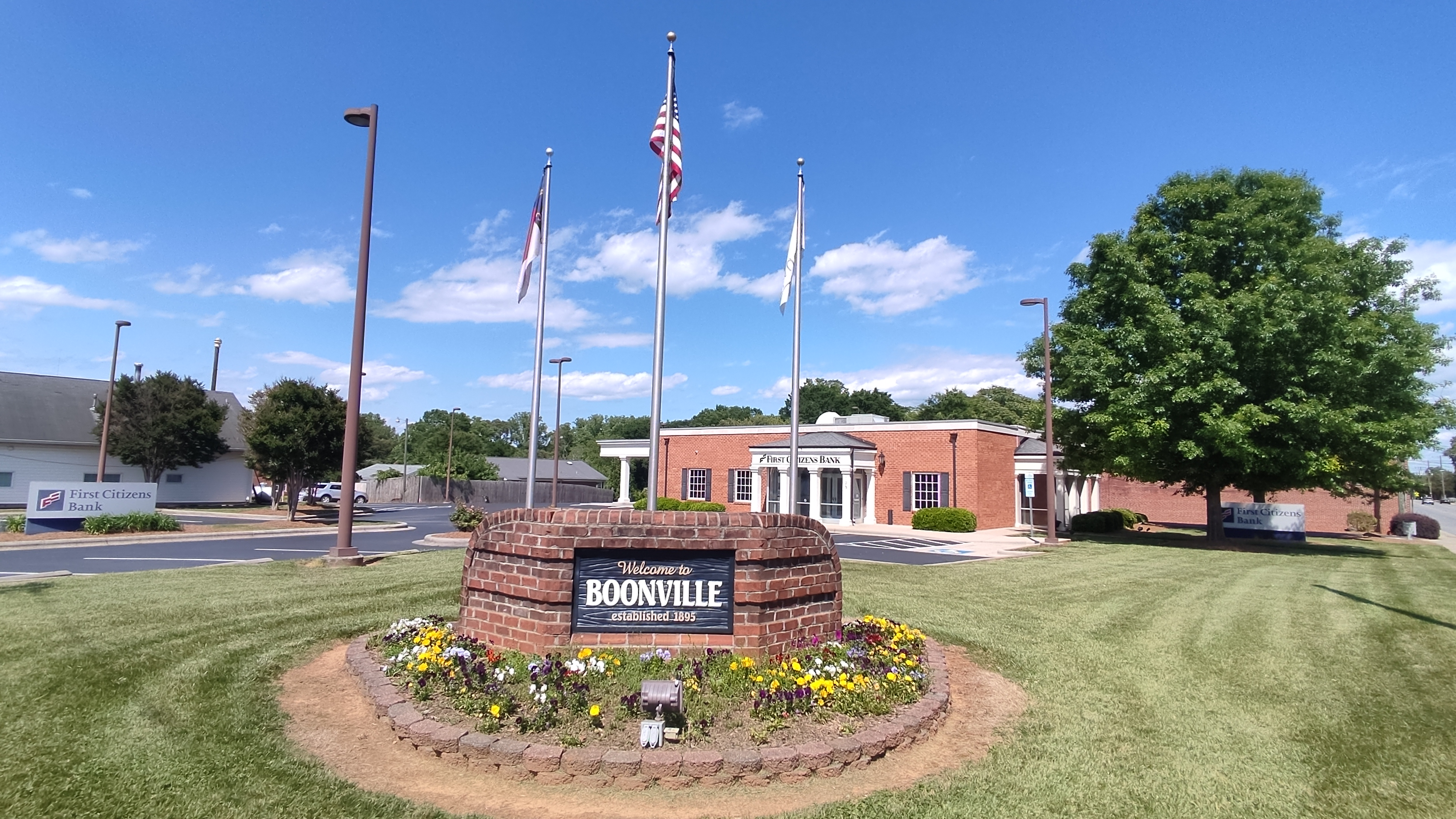
- Boonville NC

- Seal
- Nickname: Crossroads of the Yadkin Valley
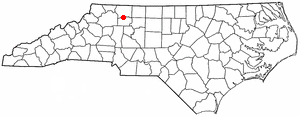
- Location of Boonville, North Carolina
- Coordinates: 36°14′28″N 80°42′34″W
- Country: United States
- State: North Carolina
- County: Yadkin

Area
  - Total: 1.20 sq mi (3.11 km^{2})
  - Land: 1.20 sq mi (3.11 km^{2})
  - Water: 0 sq mi (0.00 km^{2})
- Elevation: 1,050 ft (320 m)

Population (2020)
  - Total: 1,185
  - Density: 988.1/sq mi (381.51/km^{2})
- Time zone: UTC-5 (Eastern (EST))
  - Summer (DST): UTC-4 (EDT)
- ZIP code: 27011
- Area code: 336
- FIPS code: 37-07140
- GNIS feature ID: 2405304
- Website: boonvillenc.com

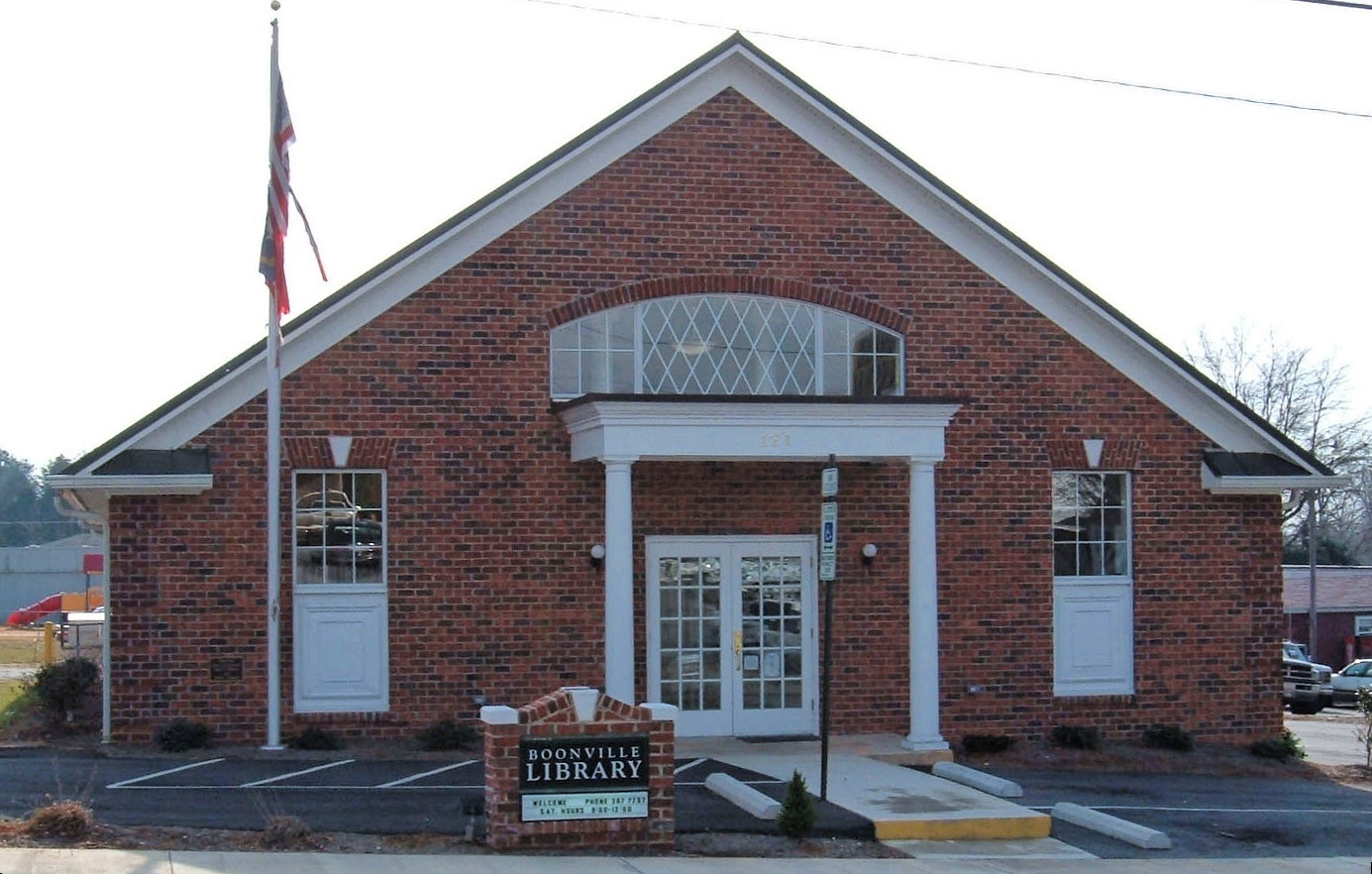
Boonville, NC library.

Boonville is a town in Yadkin County, North Carolina, United States. The population was 1,185 at the 2020 census.

== History ==
Boonville was named for Daniel Boone. A post office has been in operation in Boonville since 1857. The town was incorporated by the North Carolina legislature on February 19, 1895.

== Geography ==
According to the United States Census Bureau, the town has a total area of 1.3 square miles (3.4 km^{2}), all land.

=== Nearby communities ===
- Jonesville
- Elkin
- East Bend
- Yadkinville
- Dobson

== Demographics ==
Historical population
Census	Pop.	Note	%±
1880	46		—
1900	183		—
1910	282		54.1%
1920	162		−42.6%
1930	394		143.2%
1940	405		2.8%
1950	502		24.0%
1960	539		7.4%
1970	687		27.5%
1980	1,028		49.6%
1990	1,009		−1.8%
2000	1,138		12.8%
2010	1,222		7.4%
2020	1,185		−3.0%
U.S. Decennial Census

=== 2020 census ===
Boonville racial composition
Race	Number	Percentage
White (non-Hispanic)	994	83.88%
Black or African American (non-Hispanic)	50	4.22%
Native American	3	0.25%
Asian	2	0.17%
Other/Mixed	60	5.06%
Hispanic or Latino	76	6.41%

As of the 2020 United States census, there were 1,185 people, 522 households, and 283 families residing in the town.

=== 2000 census ===
As of the census of 2000, there were 1,138 people, 476 households, and 343 families residing in the town. The population density was 894.0 inhabitants per square mile (345.2/km^{2}). There were 511 housing units at an average density of 401.4 per square mile (155.0/km^{2}). The racial makeup of the town was 94.29% White, 4.48% African American, 0.26% Asian, 0.70% from other races, and 0.26% from two or more races. Hispanic or Latino of any race were 0.35% of the population.

There were 476 households, out of which 35.5% had children under the age of 18 living with them, 54.6% were married couples living together, 14.7% had a female householder with no husband present, and 27.9% were non-families. 26.5% of all households were made up of individuals, and 14.1% had someone living alone who was 65 years of age or older. The average household size was 2.38 and the average family size was 2.85.

In the town, the population was spread out, with 24.3% under the age of 18, 7.2% from 18 to 24, 28.3% from 25 to 44, 24.3% from 45 to 64, and 15.9% who were 65 years of age or older. The median age was 39 years. For every 100 females, there were 88.4 males. For every 100 females age 18 and over, there were 80.5 males.

The median income for a household in the town was $32,019, and the median income for a family was $42,794. Males had a median income of $30,341 versus $21,298 for females. The per capita income for the town was $16,101. About 13.2% of families and 13.0% of the population were below the poverty line, including 16.4% of those under age 18 and 15.4% of those age 65 or over.

== Infrastructure ==
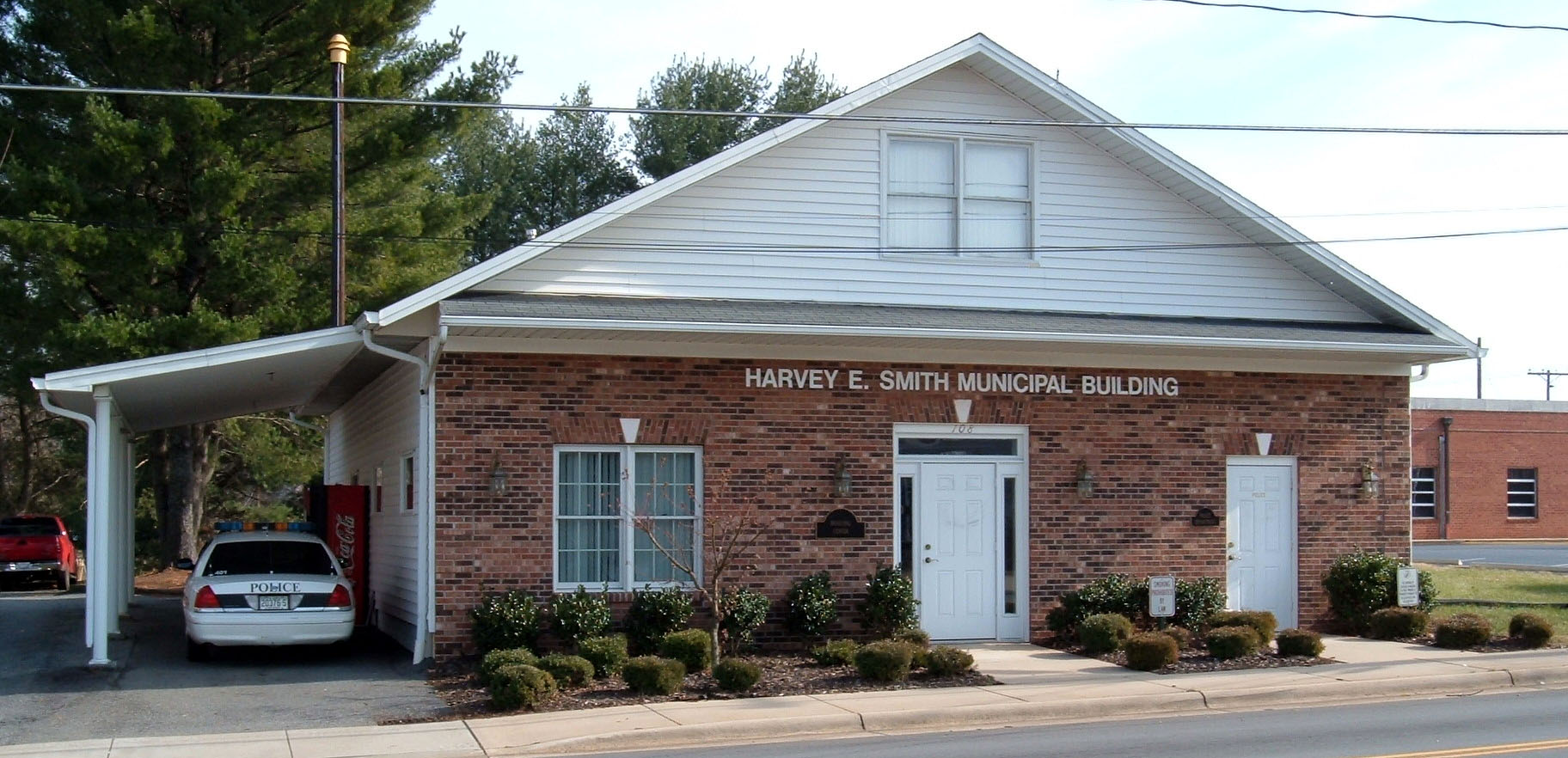
Boonville Police Station

=== Fire department ===
The Boonville Community Volunteer Fire Department was organized in 1941. The former fire department building has since been named the Harvey E Smith Municipal Building and now houses the police station and meeting space for the town council. The new fire station was erected in 1997. It houses numerous apparatus and is operated by both volunteer personnel and paid staff.

== Notable people ==
- Mamrie Hart, comedian, actress and writer
- Heather Macy, women's college basketball coach
- L. D. Williams, professional basketball player
