= Yadkinville, North Carolina =

- Town
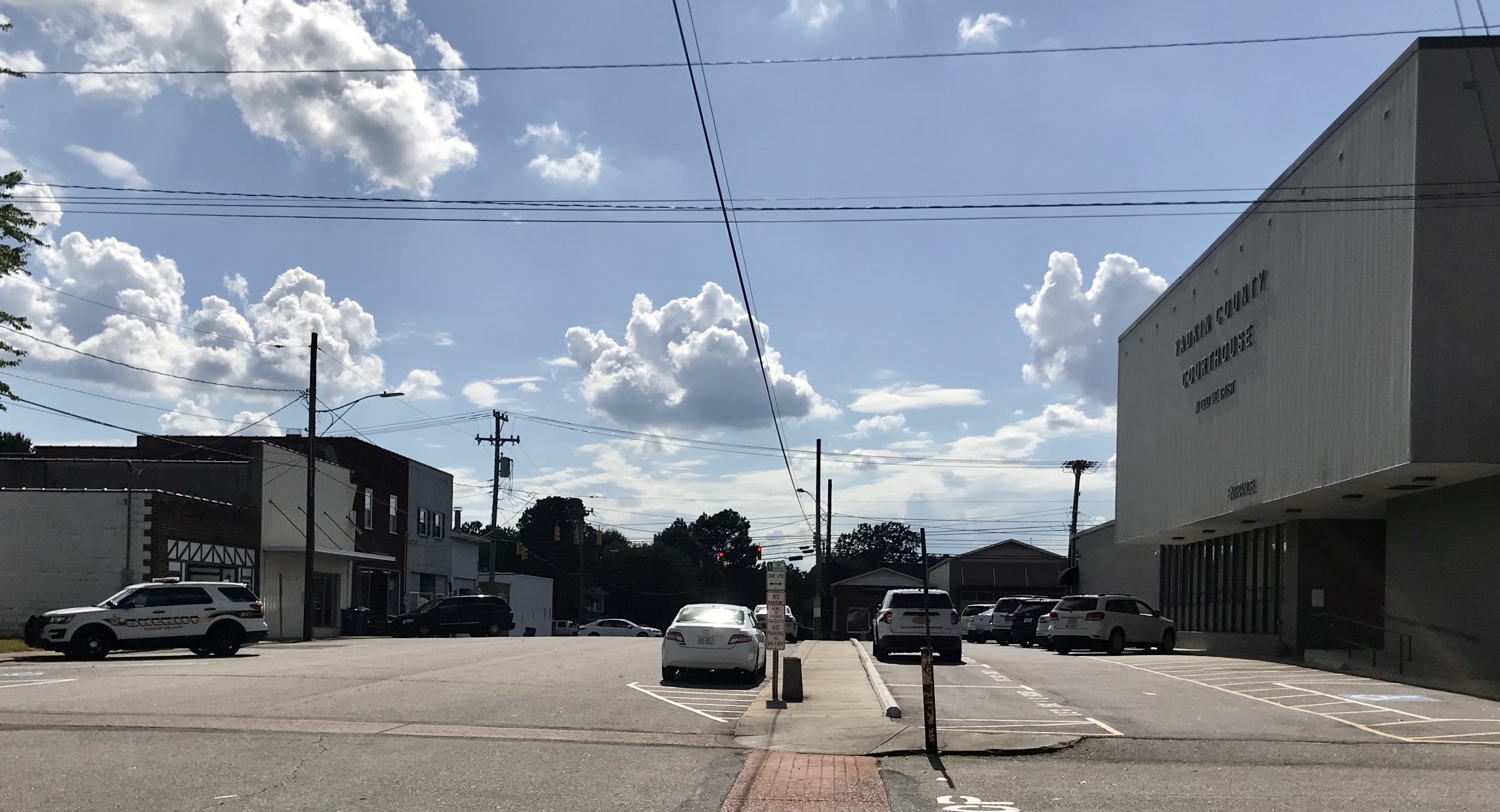
- East Elm Street in downtown Yadkinville

- Flag Seal
- Motto: "A Town in Progress"
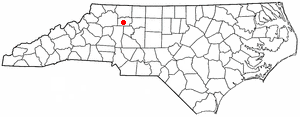
- Location of Yadkinville, North Carolina
- Coordinates: 36°07′53″N 80°39′34″W
- Country: United States
- State: North Carolina
- County: Yadkin

Area
  - Total: 2.94 sq mi (7.61 km^{2})
  - Land: 2.93 sq mi (7.59 km^{2})
  - Water: 0.0077 sq mi (0.02 km^{2})
- Elevation: 929 ft (283 m)

Population (2020)
  - Total: 2,995
  - Estimate (2025): 3,032
  - Density: 1,022/sq mi (394.6/km^{2})
- Demonym: Yadkinvillian
- Time zone: UTC-5 (Eastern (EST))
  - Summer (DST): UTC-4 (EDT)
- ZIP code: 27055
- Area code: 336
- FIPS code: 37-75960
- GNIS feature ID: 2406921
- Website: www.yadkinville.org

Yadkinville is the county seat and town most populous of Yadkin County, North Carolina, United States, located in the Piedmont Triad. The population was 2,997 at the 2020 census.

== History ==
The area was chosen as the county seat with the founding of Yadkin County in 1850. It was first known as Wilson, in honor of Louis D. Wilson, a legislator who died in the Mexican War. However, the name was changed to Yadkinville in 1852 after it was discovered that another area, Wilson, North Carolina, already had the name. At the time the county seat was established, there was only one house in town. Yadkinville was incorporated in 1857.

The first courthouse, a two-story brick building, was built in 1853 by William White of Hamptonville, North Carolina. The bricks were handmade on a farm north of town. The courthouse was torn down in 1958 and a new building was constructed.

The Second Yadkin County Jail was listed on the National Register of Historic Places in 1988.

== Geography ==
According to the United States Census Bureau, the town has a total area of 2.7 square miles (7.0 km^{2}), all land.

== Demographics ==
Historical population
Census	Pop.	Note	%±
1870	133		—
1880	120		−9.8%
1890	175		45.8%
1900	292		66.9%
1910	432		47.9%
1920	445		3.0%
1930	590		32.6%
1940	734		24.4%
1950	820		11.7%
1960	1,644		100.5%
1970	2,232		35.8%
1980	2,216		−0.7%
1990	2,525		13.9%
2000	2,818		11.6%
2010	2,959		5.0%
2020	2,995		1.2%
U.S. Decennial Census

=== 2020 census ===
As of the 2020 census, there were 2,995 people and 1,070 households in the town, including 599 families.

Yadkinville racial composition
Race	Number	Percentage
White (non-Hispanic)	2,018	67.38%
Black or African American (non-Hispanic)	166	5.54%
Native American	7	0.23%
Asian	21	0.7%
Other/Mixed	103	3.44%
Hispanic or Latino	680	22.7%

The median age was 42.8 years. 20.9% of residents were under the age of 18 and 23.1% of residents were 65 years of age or older. For every 100 females, there were 90.8 males, and for every 100 females age 18 and over there were 86.8 males age 18 and over.

0.0% of residents lived in urban areas, while 100.0% lived in rural areas.

Of the 1,070 households, 29.8% had children under the age of 18 living in them. Of all households, 39.4% were married-couple households, 17.6% were households with a male householder and no spouse or partner present, and 37.3% were households with a female householder and no spouse or partner present. About 34.2% of all households were made up of individuals, and 16.5% had someone living alone who was 65 years of age or older.

There were 1,203 housing units, of which 11.1% were vacant. The homeowner vacancy rate was 1.3% and the rental vacancy rate was 10.0%.

=== 2000 census ===
According to the 2000 census, there were 2,818 people, 959 households, and 641 families residing in the town. The population density was 1,034.2 inhabitants per square mile (399.3/km^{2}). There were 1,026 housing units at an average density of 376.5 per square mile (145.4/km^{2}). The racial makeup of the town was 85.84% White, 6.53% African American, 0.04% Native American, 0.18% Asian, 6.32% from other races, and 1.10% from two or more races. Hispanic or Latino of any race were 18.81% of the population.

There were 959 households; 30.4% had children under the age of 18 living with them, 49.8% were married couples living together, 11.6% had a female householder with no husband present, and 33.1% were non-families. 30.2% of all households were made up of individuals, and 14.3% had someone living alone who was 65 years of age or older. The average household size was 2.51, and the average family size was 3.10.

In the town, the population was spread out, with 23.0% under the age of 18, 8.1% from 18 to 24, 27.3% from 25 to 44, 20.4% from 45 to 64, and 21.3% who were 65 years of age or older. The median age was 39 years. For every 100 females, there were 91.8 males. For every 100 females age 18 and over, there were 85.6 males.

The median income for a household in the town was $31,250, and the median income for a family was $45,000. Males had a median income of $25,172 versus $25,273 for females. The per capita income for the town was $14,792. About 10.6% of families and 14.4% of the population were below the poverty line, including 19.1% of those under age 18 and 13.9% of those age 65 or over.

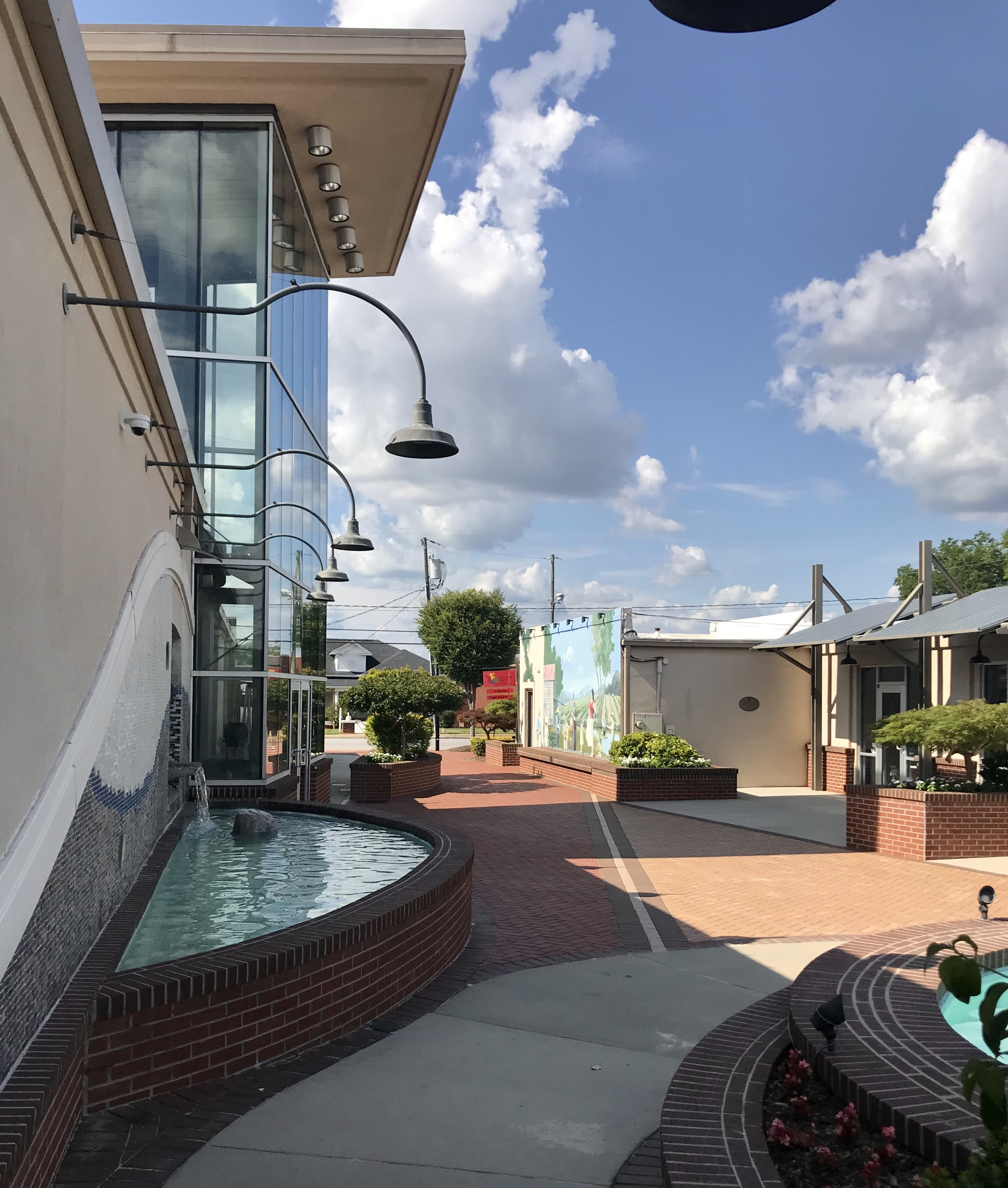
Yadkin Cultural Arts Center

== Arts and culture ==
Yadkinville is known locally for its "Harvest Festival" and "Grape Festival," which honors the Yadkin Valley Vineyards as well as other vineyards around North Carolina and Virginia.

== Notable person ==
- Mo Cowan, United States Senator from Massachusetts
