= Elkin =

Elkin may refer to:

== Places ==
- Elkin, North Carolina, a town in Elkin Township
- Elkin Township, Surry County, North Carolina, containing the town of Elkin
- Elkin Municipal Airport, of the Town of Elkin, North Carolina
- Elkin Bridges, bridges near Elkin, North Carolina
- Elkin's Ferry Battleground, site of Civil War Battle of Elkin's Ferry
- Elkin Creek Guest Ranch Airport, British Columbia, Canada

== Other uses ==
- Elkin (name)

== See also ==
- Elkins (disambiguation)
