= Health care in Colombia =

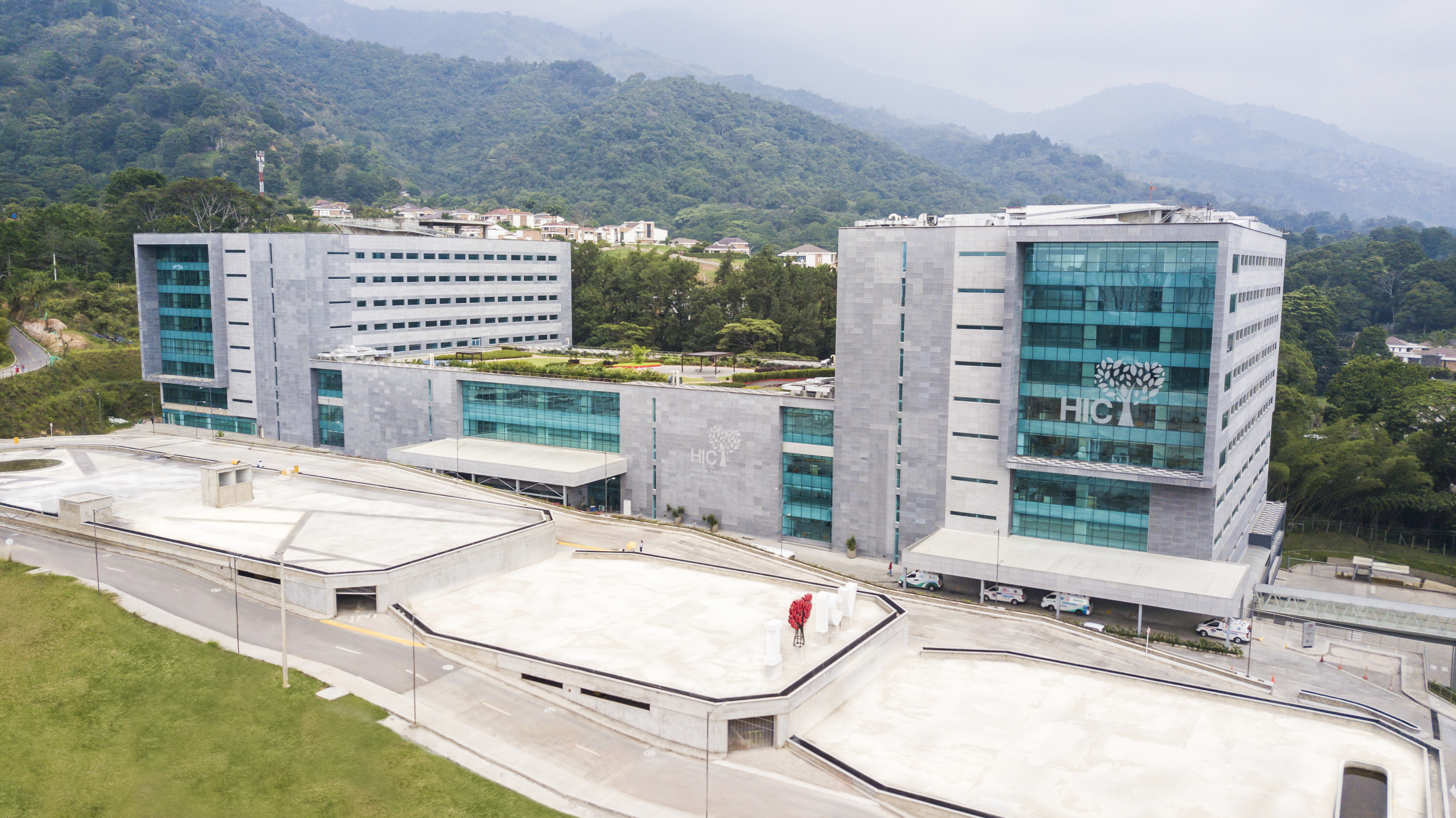
Colombia International Hospital located in Floridablanca, Santander.

Health care in Colombia is offered by the medical, nursing, and allied health professions in the Republic of Colombia.

The Human Rights Measurement Initiative finds that Colombia is fulfilling 94.0% of what it should be fulfilling for the right to health based on its level of income. When looking at the right to health with respect to children, Colombia achieves 96.3% of what is expected based on its current income. In regards to the right to health amongst the adult population, the country achieves only 91.7% of what is expected based on the nation's level of income. Colombia falls into the "fair" category when evaluating the right to reproductive health because the nation is fulfilling 93.9% of what the nation is expected to achieve based on the resources (income) it has available. The country is in 11th position among 200 countries when measuring the effectiveness of its health system.

== Health issues ==
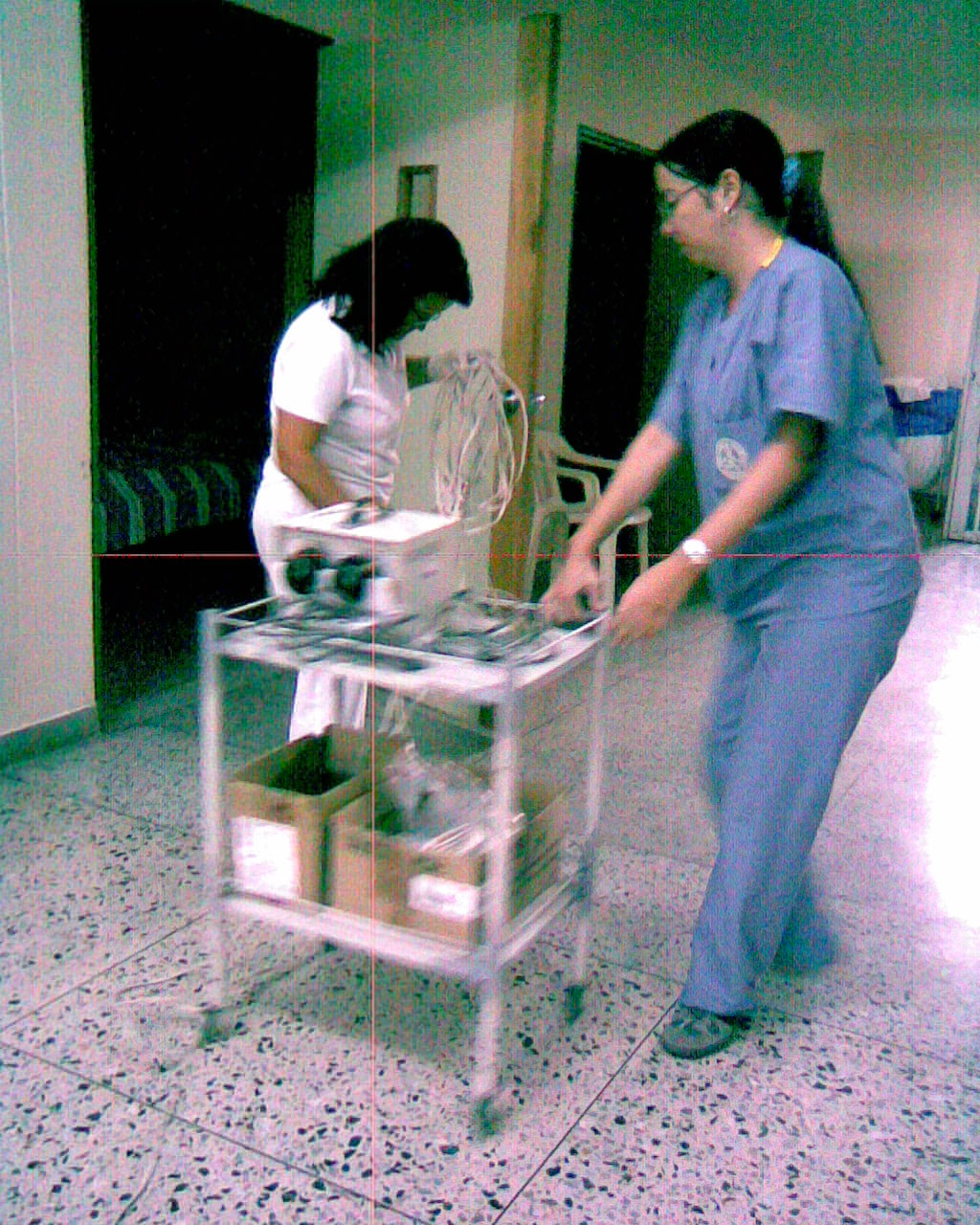
A psychiatry resident prepares to carry out ECT therapy at the mental health unit of the Federico Lleras Acosta in Ibagué

Tropical diseases are important issues in Colombia because they are major causes of death. Malaria affects nearly 85% of the national territory, mainly the Pacific Ocean coast, the Amazon jungle and eastern savannas, with an estimated 250,000 cases/year and a mortality rate of 3/100,000.

The main agent is Plasmodium vivax with 66% of the cases, except on the Pacific coast, where Plasmodium falciparum causes 75% of the cases.

Yellow fever and dengue fever are major public health concerns, because of their high epidemic potential, high mortality rate and wide distribution of Aedes aegypti. The Colombian government develops vaccination campaigns against yellow fever on a regular basis.

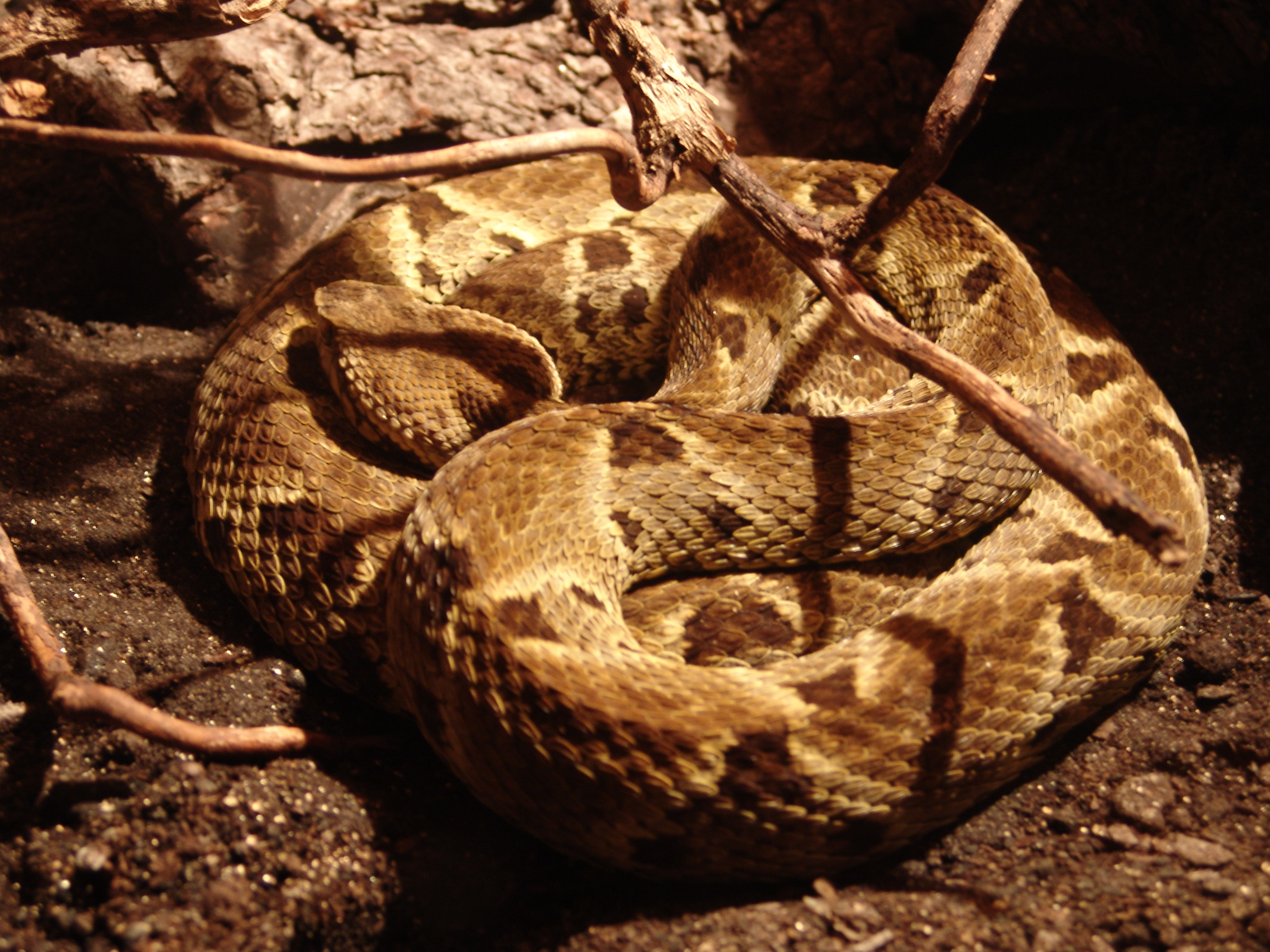
Bothrops atrox is the main cause of snakebites in the Orinochian and Amazonian regions of Colombia.

Chagas disease is endemic to the Santander Department and nearby areas. Other diseases such as leishmaniasis, rabies, Venezuelan equine encephalitis virus and West Nile virus are also present in Colombia. Snakebites are a big concern, because of the shortage in antivenom supplies countrywide.

Different forms of malnutrition severely affect the population, especially children under five years of age, with moderate to severe rates of malnutrition of 21% and iron deficiency anemia of 23%. (see aguapanela).

== History ==
In 1514, a swine plague killed a majority of the thousand inhabitants of Darién in modern-day Urabá. In 1550, Cartagena suffered an epidemic of leprosy, which they called "elefancia".

The first graduated medical doctor, Alvaro de Aunón came to New Granada from Seville, Spain, in 1597 and stayed for a short time. The first drug-store in Colombia was opened at the same time, in the main square of Bogotá by Pedro Lopez Buiza.

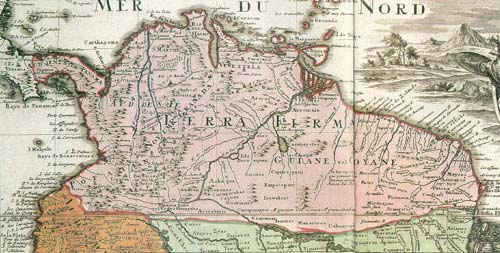
Old map of the New Kingdom of Granada

In 1636, Rodrigo Enriquez de Andrade started the first faculty of medicine in the New Granada, at St Bartholomew's College with little success because of the prejudices against the medical career in the Spanish culture, where it was considered vulgar and appropriate for lower-class people. Most of the medical practice in the country was provided by people without formal education. The first medical book written in Colombia was "Tratado de medicina y modelo de curar en estas partes de Indias" (English: Treatise on Medice and Models for Curing in These Parts of the Indies) by Pedro Fernandez de Valenzuela (1662).

In 1740, don Vicente Tomás Cansino started the medical program at Our Lady of the Rosary University. The medical care at the time was made almost exclusively in the particular homes of the sick people due lo the lack of health institutions. The first hospital in Colombia was San Pedro Hospital, in the capital city Bogotá. The hospital started functioning in 1564, built by bishop Juan de los Barrios. In 1739 the Hospital San Juan de Dios, Bogota was opened, built by fray Pedro Pablo Villamor.

In 1877, Anna Galvis Hotz became the first Colombian woman to become a Doctor of Medicine having graduated the University of Bern in Switzerland since women could not attend university in Colombia at the time. In 1925, Paulina Beregoff became the first woman to become a Doctor of Medicine from a Colombian institution, the Russian-American graduated from the University of Cartagena. In 1945, Inés Ochoa Pérez became the first Colombian woman to become a Doctor of Medicine from a Colombian institution having graduated from the National University of Colombia.

Health standards in Colombia have improved greatly since the 1980s. A 1993 reform transformed the structure of public health care funding by shifting the burden of subsidy from providers to users. As a result, employees have been obligated to pay into health plans to which employers also contribute. This new system has widened population coverage by the social and health security system from 21% (pre-1993) to 56% in 2004, 66% in 2005 and 97% in 2023.

The refractive surgery keratomileusis was developed by Ignacio Barraquer in 1964 in Bogotá. On January 10, 1985, Dr. Elkin Lucena performed the first successful in vitro fertilization, that allowed the birth of the first Latin American test tube baby Carolina Mendez. On December 14, 1985, the Dr. Alberto Villegas performed the first heart transplant in Latin America to Antonio Yepes.

On May 20, 1994, Dr. Manuel Elkin Patarroyo received the Prince of Asturias Awards by his technical and scientific research in the development of synthetic malaria vaccine.

In 2002 Colombia had 58,761 physicians, 23,950 nurses, and 33,951 dentists; these numbers equated to 1.35 physicians, 0.55 nurses, and 0.78 dentists per 1,000 people, respectively. In 2005 Colombia was reported to have only 1.1 physicians per 1,000 people, as compared with a Latin American average of 1.5.

In April 2025, Colombia declared a national health and economic emergency in response to a severe yellow fever outbreak that has resulted in 74 confirmed cases and 34 deaths since the start of the year. The outbreak, centered in the Tolima region, is the most significant in over two decades and has been exacerbated by climate change and deforestation, which have expanded the habitat of disease-carrying mosquitoes to higher altitudes. In response, the government has mandated vaccination cards for travelers and launched a nationwide immunization campaign to curb the spread of the disease.

== Status of public health ==
Life expectancy development in Colombia

General government spending on health accounted for 20.5% of total government expenditures and for 84.1% of total health expenditures (private expenditures made up the balance) in 2003. Total expenditures on health constituted 5.6 percent of domestic product in 2005. The per capita expenditure on health care in 2005 at an average exchange rate was US$150.

Urban and rural residents experienced significant differences in access to health care. The coverage in the three largest cities—Bogotá, Medellín, and Cali—was almost 95 percent. At the rural level, the best services were delivered by the departments in the coffee-growing areas. At the bottom of the scale—in terms of quality and coverage—were the rural areas in the non-Andean regions as well as the marginal neighborhoods in medium-sized and small cities.

Since 2001–2 Colombia has halved its homicide rate, which was more than 60 per 100,000 inhabitants, or 28,837, in 2002, one of the world's highest homicide rates. In 2006, a total of 17,206 violent deaths were recorded, the lowest figure since 1987. Other than homicide, heart disease is the main cause of premature death, followed by strokes, respiratory diseases, road accidents, and diabetes. Waterborne diseases such as cerebral malaria and leishmaniasis are prevalent in lowland and coastal areas. Child immunization for measles in 2004 as a percentage of children under 12 months of age was 92 percent.

Acquired immune deficiency syndrome (AIDS) is the fifth-leading cause of death in the working-age population. According to Colombia's National Health Institute data reported in 2003, nearly 240,000 people—mostly women and young people—or 0.6 percent of the population had been infected with the virus since AIDS arrived in Colombia in October 1983. Estimates of the number of people living with human immunodeficiency virus (HIV), adults and children (0–49 years of age), in 2005 ranged from 160,000 to 310,000. The comparable figure for women (15–49 years of age) was 62,000. The number of AIDS and hepatitis B cases has been rising. In 2005, the estimated HIV adult prevalence rate (15–49 years of age) was 0.6 percent. As of 2006, between 5,200 and 12,000 people had died from AIDS. Services provided by the new Multisectoral National Plan, launched in July 2004, include integrated care for people living with HIV and provision of antiretroviral drugs. Under the plan, about 12,000 people have been receiving combined antiretroviral therapy (approximately 54% of those requiring it).

=== Vaccination ===
As of 2016, Colombia vaccinated against 26 diseases and participated in Vaccination Week In The Americas. Colombia began vaccinating against COVID-19 in February 2021.

== Law 100 of 1991 ==
The national constitution was reformed in 1991 and with this purpose the general system of social security was reformed with the implementation of Law 100, which widely extended health coverage to the population; the economic resources to finance this reform, however, were insufficient, causing the collapse of many public health institutions and affecting the income of the medical staff. The law 100 of 1993 is divided into four books:

- First book: About Pension regulations.
- Second book: About the general system of healthcare
- Third book: About Occupational safety and health
- Fourth book: About Complementary social services

The reform of the Colombian healthcare had three main goals:

- The achievement of an antitrust policy, to avoid the statal health monopoly.
- The incorporation of private health providers into the healthcare market
- The creation of a subsidiated healthcare sector covering the poorest population.

The general principles of the law determine that healthcare is a public service that must be granted under conditions of proficiency, universality, social solidarity and participation. Article 153 of the law mandates that health insurance be compulsory, that health providers must have administrative autonomy, and that health users must have free choice of health providers.

== Glossary of acronyms ==
- SISBEN: Sistema de Identificación de Beneficiarios de Subsidios Sociales (system of identification for social subsidies beneficiaries).
- EPS: Entidades Promotoras de Salud. (Health promoting entities)
- EPS-S: Entidades Promotoras de Salud Subsidiadas. (Subsidized Health promoting entities).
- INS: Instituto Nacional de Salud (National Institute of Health)
- IPS: Instituciones Prestadoras de Servicios de Salud. (Health providing institutions)
- ESE: Empresas Sociales del Estado. (Statal social organizations)
- ESS: Empresas Solidarias de Salud. (Health solidarity organizations)
- CCF: Cajas de Compensación Familiar. (Family welfare financial institutions)
- POS: Plan Obligatorio de Salud. (Compulsory plan of health)
- Fondo SYGA or FOSYGA: Fondo de Solidaridad y Garantía. (Fund of Solidarity and guarantees)
- MAPIPOS: Manual de Procedimientos y Actividades del POS. (POS-related procedures and activities handbook)
- SOAT: Seguro Obligatorio de Accidentes de Tránsito (Compulsory Auto insurance)

== SISBEN ==
The System for the Selection of Beneficiaries for Social Programs (El Sistema de Seleccion de Beneficiarios para Programas Sociales), the national system of identification of beneficiaries for social subsidy, classifies the people according to the residential properties that should receive public services. All mayors should do the stratification of residential properties of their municipality or district.

Most of the social subsidies and public health programs are focused in strata 1 and 2 (and the newly introduced stratum 0). The fraudulent expedition of low level SISBEN ID cards is currently one of the major problems in the healthcare system. Regional politicians are often accused of providing them in exchange for votes to people that are not genuinely in need. Wrong identification of beneficiaries and political issues present a challenge to the system which is preventing people in need from receiving the subsidies and benefits designed for them.

== EPS ==
The National Health Superintendent (Superintendencia de Salud) defines which organizations may qualify as EPS according to a number or requirements, including infrastructure, capital, number of users, functionality and covering. The function of the EPS is to sell health service packages to the public, and contract such services with the healthcare-providing institution.

Some EPS providers offer a "Plan Complementario" that offers more expanded coverage and priority service to the patient.

Most EPS providers also offer "Medicina Prepagada" that offers the highest level of medical attention and priority service to the patient at much higher costs.

== Health professionals and the healthcare system ==
As of October 1, 2014, there were 3,620 health establishments in Colombia, including hospitals, clinics and ambulance services. Private healthcare establishments account for 57% of all establishments within the country.

While no single city or state stands out as being a centralized hub for hospitals, 80% of establishments are found within 16 (of 39 states).

Colombia ranks 22nd on the World Health Organization's list of the best healthcare systems. Health standards in Colombia have improved very much since the 1980s, healthcare reforms have led to the massive improvements in the healthcare systems of the country. Although this new system has widened population coverage by the social and health security system from 21% (pre-1993) to 96% in 2012, health disparities persist.

A study conducted by América Economía magazine ranked 21 Colombian health care institutions among the top 44 in Latin America, amounting to 48 percent of the total. A cancer research and treatment centre was declared as a Project of National Strategic Interest.

== See also ==
- Health care systems
- List of hospitals in Colombia
- Water supply and sanitation in Colombia
