= Elkins (surname) =

Elkins is a surname. Notable people with the surname include:

- Aaron Elkins (born 1935), American mystery writer
- Bob Elkins (1932–2022), American character actor who appeared in movies, plays and television productions
- Caroline Elkins (born 1959), American academic
- Carolyn Elkins, American poet, teacher, and editor
- Charlotte Elkins (born 1948), American author and wife of writer Aaron Elkins
- Corey Elkins (born 1985), left wing for the Los Angeles Kings of the National Hockey League
- Dane Elkins (born 1999), American professional racquetball player
- Darren Elkins, American mixed martial artist
- Davis Elkins (1876–1959), American industrialist, son of Stephen Benton Elkins
- Eleanore Elkins (1861-1937), American heiress and philanthropist
- Gary Elkins (born 1966), English football player
- Gary Elkins (born 1955), American politician
- Hillard Elkins ("Hilly" Elkins, 1929–2010), American theatre and film producer
- Jim Elkins (Oregon criminal), crime boss in Portland, Oregon in the mid-20th century
- James Elkins (art critic) (born 1954), art critic and art historian based in Chicago
- John Elkins (1815–1898), American politician
- Larry Elkins (born 1943), former American football player
- Luther Elkins (1809–1887), American politician and pioneer in the state of Oregon
- Margreta Elkins (1939–2009), Australian opera singer
- Mike Elkins (born 1966), former quarterback in the National Football League and the World League of American Football
- Stanley Elkins, (1925–2013) American historian, history professor, and Jewish nonfiction author who wrote Slavery: A Problem in American Institutional and Intellectual Life and The Age of Federalism
- Steve Elkins (born 1951), American cinematographer and explorer
- Stephen Benton Elkins (1841–1911), American industrialist, father of Davis Elkins
- Steven A. Elkins (born 1966), American Artist and award winning barbecue pitmaster
- Terence James Elkins (born 1936), American physicist
- William Lukens Elkins (1832–1903), American businessman and art collector
- Wilson Homer Elkins (1909–1994), president of the University of Maryland from 1954 to 1978

== See also ==
- Harry Elkins Widener
- Elkin (name)
