= Tobon =

Tobon may refer to:

- Spanish surname Tobón
- a Norwegian rename of the MV Empire MacRae
