= Elkins =

Elkins may refer to:

== Places ==
=== United States ===
- Elkins, Arkansas, a city
- Elkins, New Hampshire, an unincorporated community
- Elkins, Texas, a ghost town
- Elkins, West Virginia, a city and county seat
- Elkins Estate, Elkins Park, Pennsylvania
- Elkins Field, a privately owned, public use airport in Bladen County, North Carolina, United States

=== Antarctica ===
- Mount Elkins

== Other uses ==
- Elkins (surname)
- Elkins High School (disambiguation)
- Elkins Hall, a historic administrative building on the campus of Nicholls State University, Thibodaux, Louisiana, on the National Register of Historic Places
- Elkins Act, a 1903 United States federal law
- Elkins v. United States, a 1960 United States Supreme Court decision
- Elkins Automatic Rifle, a model of the Lee-Enfield rifle
- Elkins Coal and Coke Company, a former coke manufacturer - see Elkins Coal and Coke Company Historic District, Preston County, West Virginia, United States, on the National Register of Historic Places

== See also ==
- Elkins Tavern, Peacham, Vermont, United States, on the National Register of Historic Places
- Elkin (disambiguation)
