= Jonesville, North Carolina =

- Town
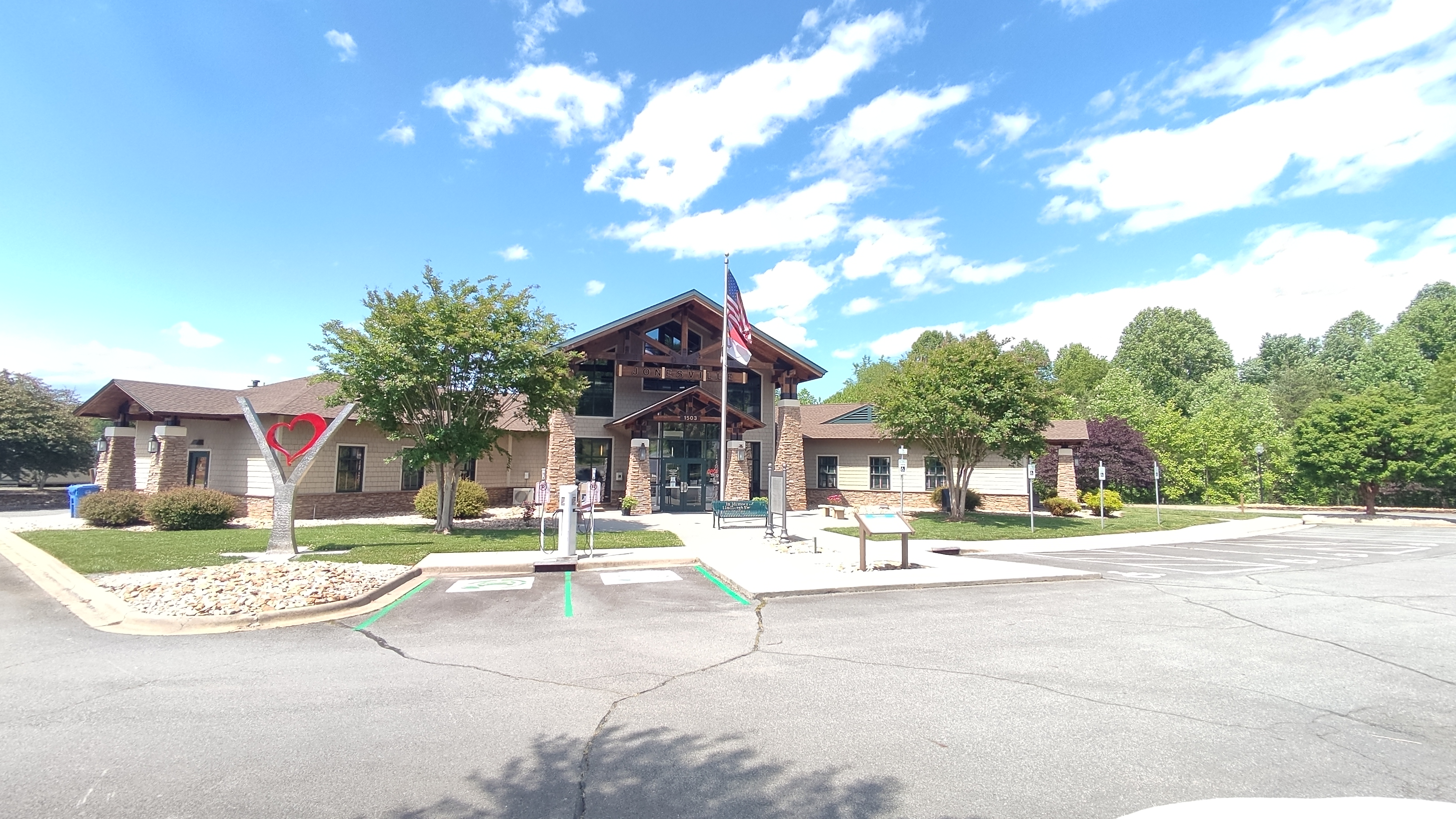
- Jonesville townhall

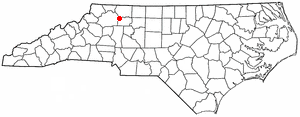
- Location of Jonesville, North Carolina
- Coordinates: 36°14′01″N 80°50′07″W
- Country: United States
- State: North Carolina
- County: Yadkin

Area
  - Total: 2.90 sq mi (7.51 km^{2})
  - Land: 2.88 sq mi (7.47 km^{2})
  - Water: 0.015 sq mi (0.04 km^{2})
- Elevation: 899 ft (274 m)

Population (2020)
  - Total: 2,308
  - Estimate (2025): 2,338
  - Density: 800.1/sq mi (308.91/km^{2})
- Time zone: UTC-5 (Eastern (EST))
  - Summer (DST): UTC-4 (EDT)
- ZIP code: 28642
- Area code: 336
- FIPS code: 37-34840
- GNIS feature ID: 2405923
- Website: https://townofjonesvillenc.com/

Jonesville, originally called Allen's Settlement, founded in 1811 under the name of Martinsborough, is the oldest town in Yadkin County, North Carolina, United States. The population was 2,308 at the 2020 census. The town grew by nearly 800 residents in 2001 when it merged with neighboring Arlington. Recognized as the Heart of the Yadkin Valley, Jonesville is a gateway to the Blue Ridge Mountains, the Yadkin Valley Heritage/Cultural Corridor and to local wineries in the Swan Creek AVA and the larger Yadkin Valley AVA, as well as offering access to the Yadkin River.

== Overview ==
The town, situated on the south bank of the Yadkin River, lies beneath Daniel Boone's hunting trails through the Brushy Mountains, in the foothills of the Blue Ridge Mountains. Visitors are served by a state-of-the-art Welcome Center. With retail and specialty shops/services in the immediate area, Jonesville offers an expanding antique mall at exit 83. Within five miles are regional sky diving facilities, an international motorcycle manufacturing plant, a restoration center for vintage cars, a popular herb farm, a History Center and historic park, a medieval reenactment center and a horse ranch specializing in riding lessons and mustang rehabilitation.

Seven local hotels, multiple fast food and conventional restaurants and gas stations are located near I-77 exits (83 and 79). Jonesville offers convenient access to athletic, college, cultural and recreational resources in larger Piedmont cities such as Winston-Salem, Statesville and Charlotte.

A military out-post during the Revolutionary and Civil Wars, Jonesville is not a typical "Interstate town." Currently working to preserve its history, it is home to an historic Bicentennial Park (Mineral Springs Park) featuring a Tri-County Veterans' Memorial with 3,000+ names of those who have served our nation since pre-Revolutionary War conflicts. The Mineral Springs Park, located along the Yadkin River, was once a respite where multiple wilderness trails converged, approximating highways 67 and 21 through Yadkin County. A recreational park (Swaim Park) with playgrounds, ball fields, tennis courts, walking trails, picnic areas and bandstand adjoin a Senior Center and a Medical Center.

A GreenWay along the Yadkin River is under development. Future plans include reconstructing a functional ferry that operated during the Civil War and establishing a walking trail along the historic woodland routes that converged in historic Mineral Springs Park.

The Yadkin River divides Jonesville and Elkin. The area is referred to as the Tri-County (Surry, Wilkes, Yadkin) Region and is located in the Yadkin Valley AVA, an American Viticultural Area. Wines made from grapes grown in the Yadkin Valley AVA may use the appellation Yadkin Valley on their labels. At least a dozen wineries are located within 15 miles (24 km) of the town.

== Geography ==
According to the United States Census Bureau, the town has a total area of 1.9 square miles (4.9 km^{2}), of which 1.9 square miles (4.9 km^{2}) is land and 0.04 square miles (0.10 km^{2}) (1.05%) is water.

== Demographics ==
Historical population
Census	Pop.	Note	%±
1880	220		—
1910	621		—
1920	787		26.7%
1930	1,306		65.9%
1940	1,733		32.7%
1950	1,768		2.0%
1960	1,895		7.2%
1970	1,659		−12.5%
1980	1,752		5.6%
1990	1,549		−11.6%
2000	1,464		−5.5%
2010	2,285		56.1%
2020	2,308		1.0%
U.S. Decennial Census

The town grew by about 800 residents after it merged with neighboring town Arlington in 2001.

=== 2020 census ===
As of the 2020 census, Jonesville had a population of 2,308. The median age was 41.0 years. 23.2% of residents were under the age of 18 and 19.9% of residents were 65 years of age or older. For every 100 females there were 88.7 males, and for every 100 females age 18 and over there were 85.5 males age 18 and over.

0.0% of residents lived in urban areas, while 100.0% lived in rural areas.

There were 1,026 households in Jonesville, including 676 families. Of those households, 30.0% had children under the age of 18 living in them. Of all households, 37.3% were married-couple households, 19.5% were households with a male householder and no spouse or partner present, and 37.2% were households with a female householder and no spouse or partner present. About 34.9% of all households were made up of individuals and 17.2% had someone living alone who was 65 years of age or older.

There were 1,132 housing units, of which 9.4% were vacant. The homeowner vacancy rate was 2.9% and the rental vacancy rate was 5.6%.

Jonesville racial composition
Race	Number	Percentage
White (non-Hispanic)	1,688	73.14%
Black or African American (non-Hispanic)	199	8.62%
Native American	5	0.22%
Asian	22	0.95%
Other/Mixed	146	6.33%
Hispanic or Latino	248	10.75%

=== 2000 census ===
As of the census of 2000, there were 1,464 people, 668 households, and 416 families residing in the town. The population density was 780.6 inhabitants per square mile (301.4/km^{2}). There were 752 housing units at an average density of 401.0 per square mile (154.8/km^{2}). The racial makeup of the town was 80.60% White, 16.26% African American, 0.07% Native American, 0.20% Asian, 1.57% from other races, and 1.30% from two or more races. Hispanic or Latino of any race were 4.51% of the population.

There were 668 households, out of which 25.7% had children under the age of 18 living with them, 42.1% were married couples living together, 17.4% had a female householder with no husband present, and 37.6% were non-families. 34.7% of all households were made up of individuals, and 16.0% had someone living alone who was 65 years of age or older. The average household size was 2.19 and the average family size was 2.80.

In the town, the population was spread out, with 22.4% under the age of 18, 8.0% from 18 to 24, 27.0% from 25 to 44, 23.4% from 45 to 64, and 19.2% who were 65 years of age or older. The median age was 40 years. For every 100 females, there were 79.0 males. For every 100 females age 18 and over, there were 76.7 males.

The median income for a household in the town was $25,543, and the median income for a family was $31,400. Males had a median income of $26,200 versus $20,242 for females. The per capita income for the town was $16,528. About 14.7% of families and 17.4% of the population were below the poverty line, including 22.8% of those under age 18 and 17.3% of those age 65 or over. These numbers were as of 2000, and are not current day.

== Transportation ==
=== Highways ===
Interstate 77 runs through the east of town. The town is accessible via two interstate exits: North Carolina Highway 67/Winston Road and Business U.S. Route 21 in the Arlington area. N.C. 67 is a heavily used artery, linking Jonesville with Winston-Salem.

Until recently, two bridges linked the commercial districts of Jonesville and Elkin, the Hugh G. Chatham Bridge and the newer Gwen McNeill Bridge, less than a mile upstream on Business U.S. 21. The Chatham Bridge, built in 1931 and regarded by many in the area as a community symbol with its tall steel beams, was closed in November 2005 after it failed a state inspection. The North Carolina Department of Transportation does not plan to reopen or replace the bridge. Neither city would take the risk of insuring the bridge so it could be saved as a historic landmark.

=== Airports ===
Swan Creek Airport, which is privately owned, is southwest of town and is the home of the Carolina Sky Diving School. Elkin Municipal Airport is located in nearby Elkin. Commercial flights are available through Piedmont Triad International Airport in Greensboro and Charlotte Douglas International Airport.

== History ==
=== Early history ===
Jonesville is Yadkin County's oldest town and was at one time the largest town west of Raleigh, according to An Illustrated History of Yadkin County 1950-1980, by William E. Rutledge Jr. Initially called Allen's Settlement, after the owner of an early iron ore forge, the settlement was established behind a towering, protective bluff above the south bank of the Yadkin River. It soon became a commercial hub for the region, featuring a trading post, a tannery, medical personnel, a school, grist and lumber mills, a cotton mill and a garrison overlooking the Yadkin Valley that served as an outpost for local militia during the Revolutionary and Civil Wars. Although a contemporary designation aligns the overmountain trail-head in an adjoining Surry County community, Allen's Settlement—formerly located in Surry County—is now recognized as part of the OverMountain Trail. Based on family journals and oral history, Allen's Settlement and historic Mineral Springs Park are identified as a mustering site for patriots who marched to defeat the British at Kings Mountain.

Allen's Settlement was incorporated as Martinsborough in 1811, but the name was later changed to Jonesville in honor of Hardy Jones (1747–1819). Jones fought in the American Revolution and was instrumental in bringing the Jonesville Male and Female Academy to Jonesville. A marker to Hardy Jones is on the lawn of Jonesville United Methodist Church.

In addition to the timber and iron ore markets, the town also grew around the Jonesville Male and Female Academy, according to Rutledge. The Academy was affiliated with the North Carolina Conference of the Methodist Church. The Rev. William L. Van Eaton, who was born in Davie County, was principal of the school at its peak in 1859. In its history, the Academy attracted numerous scholars of the era, including Bishop Francis Asbury and Brantley York, subsequent founder of Trinity-Union Institute, which was later named Duke University.

On April 1, 1865, troops commanded by Union Brigadier General George Stoneman and Colonel Alvan C. Gillem devastated the town and the Academy in their search for Confederate soldiers and supplies. In the Academy, they broke chandeliers and destroyed school equipment. This marked the end of the school.

Gillem's troops, known as "home Yankees," also ransacked businesses and chased away teachers and military-aged men. Union troops had been told the town was a haven for Confederate spies and military supplies. They failed to find evidence of an Underground Railroad for escaping slaves and deserting soldiers, assumed to be located in private homes and the iron ore caves in Jonesville. The town never fully recovered.

One of the last pieces of early town history, a house once occupied by Van Eaton that dated back to the 1830s, was torn down in 1996. At the time, it was believed to be the oldest house in town.

On December 21, 1912, two elderly women and a young girl were killed and nearly 100 people were injured after the floor of the Jonesville High School auditorium collapsed during a Christmas concert. As the floor of the second-floor auditorium gave way in the center, the audience of at least 300 people dropped to the first floor. Killed were: Nancy Swaim, Mrs. William Smith and Lexie Luffman, a 12-year-old girl. Sam Ray extinguished a fire in a stove in the auditorium as the floor began to collapse, saving many lives (Winston-Salem Journal).

=== Recent history ===
The town experienced unprecedented growth after Interstate 77 opened in 1974. The intersection of Interstate 77 and N.C. 67 (Winston Road) on the east side of town is a popular stop for travelers. It is one of the most developed along the interstate between Statesville and Mount Airy.

In 1980, Jonesville was named a "Governor's Community of Excellence" by Governor Jim Hunt for its economic development work.

Jonesville Police Sgt. Gregory Keith Martin was shot to death on October 5, 1996, on I-77. The case, which has been solved, received national attention on TV's America's Most Wanted in May 2005, January 2006 and June 2006. Martin was the town's first police officer to be shot in the line of duty. On October 3, 2012, 36-year-old Scott Vincent Sica was arrested in Cape Coral, Florida, and charged with first-degree murder. In 2009 The town put up a memorial to Sgt. Martin in front of the new town Hall. Every year there is a memorial ride through Jonesville to honor Sgt. Martin.

In 2009, the town built a multimillion-dollar town hall.

== Local media ==
=== Print ===
Two community newspapers, The Tribune in Elkin and its sister paper The Yadkin Ripple, provide coverage of Jonesville. The Winston-Salem Journal, a larger daily newspaper, also covers the town.

=== Broadcast ===
Jonesville is part of the Piedmont Triad radio and television market, but many broadcasts from the Charlotte and Winston-Salem markets can be received as well. The cable provider is Time Warner.

== Notable people ==
- Dickie Hemric – former NBA player for the Boston Celtics (1955–1957), played collegiately at Wake Forest (1951–1955). Hemric was the all-time leading scorer in Atlantic Coast Conference history, until JJ Redick broke his record in 2006. Named to the ACC 50th Anniversary men's basketball team in 2003.
- Carlos King – former running back for N.C. State, drafted as a fourth-round pick by the Pittsburgh Steelers in 1998. King holds the career rushing record for Starmount High School at 5,321 yards.
- Adam Leroy Lane – convicted murderer
