= Gwyn Avenue–Bridge Street Historic District =

Historic district in North Carolina, United States

- U.S. National Register of Historic Places
- U.S. Historic district
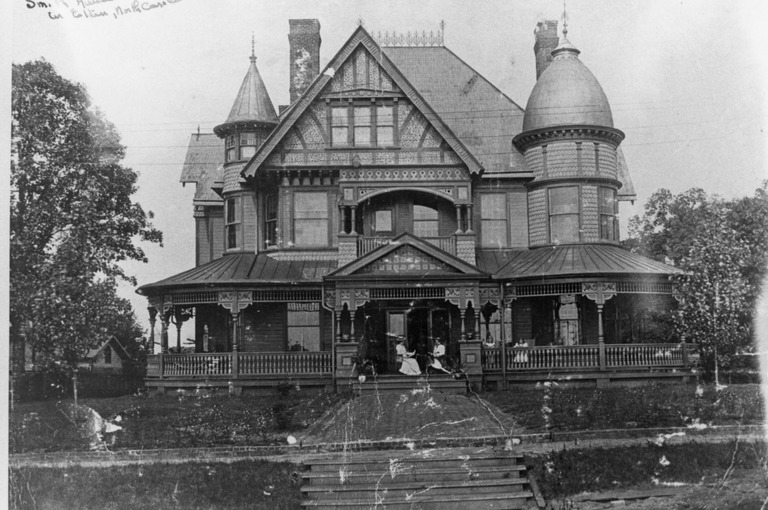
- Alexander Martin Smith House

- Location within North Carolina Location within the United States
- Location: Roughly bounded by N. Bridge St., Mill View Rd., Market St. and Church St., Elkin, North Carolina
- Coordinates: 36°14′42″N 80°50′56″W
- Area: 60 acres (24 ha)
- Architect: Ludlow, Jacob Lott; Barber, George Franklin
- Architectural style: Queen Anne, Colonial Revival, Bungalow/craftsman
- NRHP reference No.: 07000882
- Added to NRHP: August 28, 2007

Gwyn Avenue–Bridge Street Historic District is a national historic district located at Elkin, Surry County, North Carolina. The district encompasses 124 contributing buildings and 1 contributing site in a predominantly residential section of Elkin. They were primarily built between about 1891 and 1955 and include notable examples of Queen Anne, Colonial Revival, and Bungalow / American Craftsman architecture. Notable buildings include the Elkin Presbyterian Church (1937, 1944, 1950, 1955, 1961), First Baptist Church (1955, 1968), Alexander Martin Smith House (1893–1897) designed by George Franklin Barber, the Gwyn-Chatham-Gwyn House (c. 1872, 1911, 1936), Richard Gwyn Smith House (c. 1918), and Mason Lillard House (c. 1910).

It was added to the National Register of Historic Places in 2007.
