= Arlington, North Carolina =

- Neighborhood
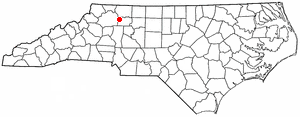
- Location of Arlington, North Carolina
- Coordinates: 36°13′39″N 80°49′55″W
- Country: United States
- State: North Carolina
- County: Yadkin
- Town: Jonesville
- Incorporated: 1893, 1930
- Annexed: 2001

Area
  - Total: 0.85 sq mi (2.2 km^{2})
  - Land: 0.85 sq mi (2.2 km^{2})
  - Water: 0 sq mi (0.0 km^{2})
- Elevation: 988 ft (301 m)

Population (2000)
  - Total: 795
  - Density: 950/sq mi (365/km^{2})
- Time zone: UTC-5 (Eastern (EST))
  - Summer (DST): UTC-4 (EDT)
- ZIP code: 28642
- Area code: 336
- FIPS code: 37-01900
- GNIS feature ID: 1018850

Arlington was a town in Yadkin County, North Carolina, United States. The population was 795 at the 2000 census.

The town was incorporated on July 23, 1930. It merged into its larger neighbor, Jonesville, after a vote on May 29, 2001. The two towns had a combined population of about 2,250 people.

== Geography ==
Arlington was located at 36°13′39″N 80°49′55″W (36.227481, -80.831861).

According to the United States Census Bureau, the town had a total area of 0.8 square miles (2.1 km^{2}), all land.

== Demographics ==
As of the census of 2000, there were 795 people, 353 households, and 242 families residing in the town. The population density was 945.4 inhabitants per square mile (365.0/km^{2}). There were 376 housing units at an average density of 447.1 per square mile (172.6/km^{2}). The racial makeup of the town was 91.95% White, 6.04% African American, 1.26% from other races, and 0.75% from two or more races. Hispanic or Latino of any race were 2.39% of the population.

There were 353 households, out of which 31.7% had children under the age of 18 living with them, 44.8% were married couples living together, 20.7% had a female householder with no husband present, and 31.2% were non-families. 27.2% of all households were made up of individuals, and 10.8% had someone living alone who was 65 years of age or older. The average household size was 2.24 and the average family size was 2.72.

In the town the population was spread out, with 24.4% under the age of 18, 6.4% from 18 to 24, 28.9% from 25 to 44, 26.8% from 45 to 64, and 13.5% who were 65 years of age or older. The median age was 36 years. For every 100 females, there were 83.6 males. For every 100 females age 18 and over, there were 81.0 males.

The median income for a household in the town was $25,789, and the median income for a family was $32,500. Males had a median income of $23,421 versus $22,250 for females. The per capita income for the town was $14,469. About 14.4% of families and 16.9% of the population were below the poverty line, including 31.1% of those under age 18 and 15.3% of those age 65 or over.
