= Hugh Chatham Memorial Hospital (historic building) =

- U.S. National Register of Historic Places
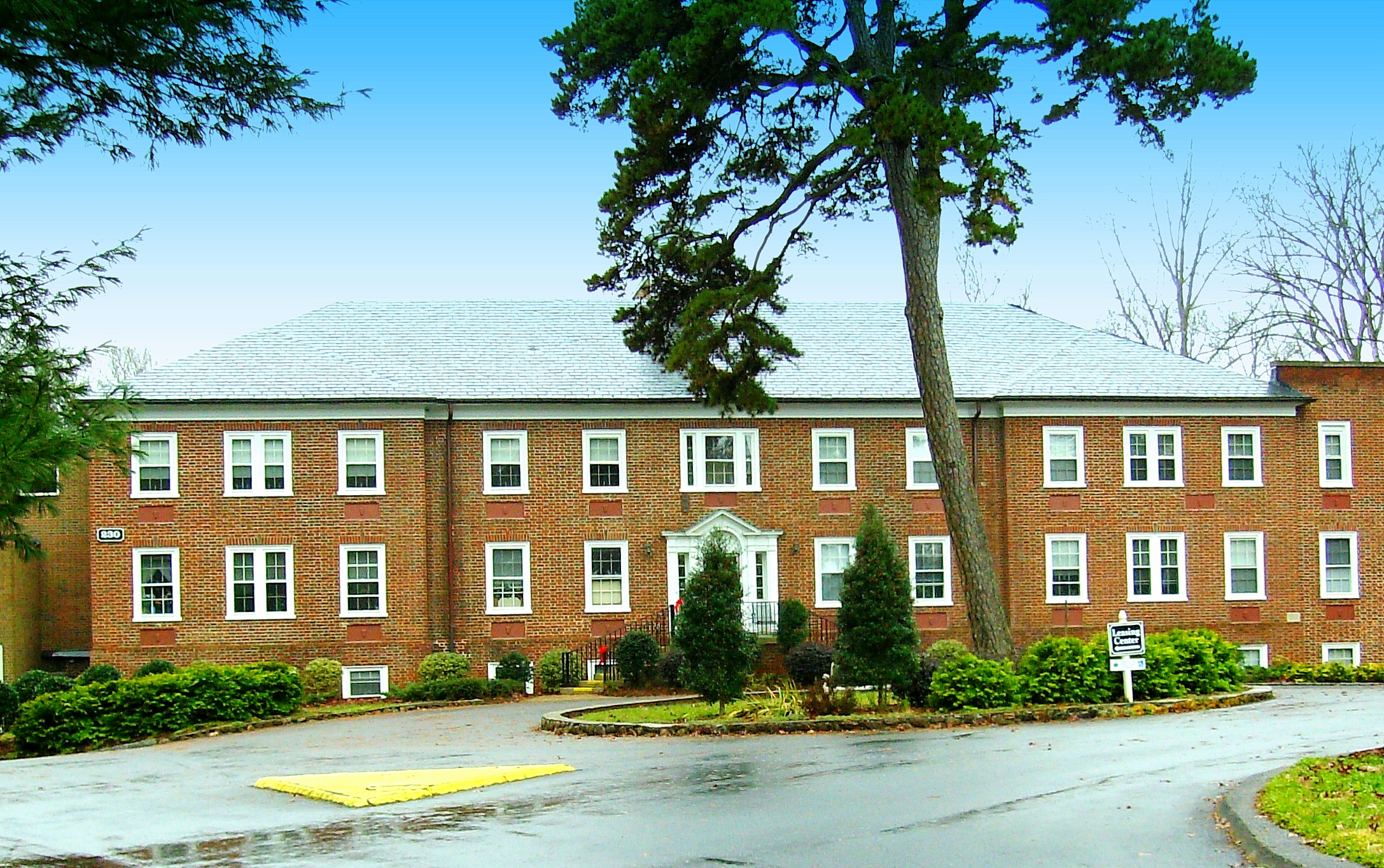
- Hugh Chatham Memorial Hospital, December 2008

- Location within North Carolina Location within the United States
- Location: 230 Hawthorne Rd., Elkin, North Carolina
- Coordinates: 36°15′17″N 80°50′45″W
- Area: 3.9 acres (1.6 ha)
- Built: 1930-1931, 1932, 1937, 1947, 1952, 1958, 1973
- Architect: Macklin, Harold; Franklin, John M., et al.
- Architectural style: Colonial Revival
- NRHP reference No.: 02000437
- Added to NRHP: May 2, 2002

Hugh Chatham Memorial Hospital is a historic hospital building located near Elkin, North Carolina. The original rectangular section was built in 1930–1931, with additions made in 1937, 1947, and 1952. The original brick section is two stories over a partially above-ground basement in the Colonial Revival style/ It is eleven bays long and two rooms deep, with a slate-covered hipped roof with a central cupola and two rear dormers. The associated Nurses' Home was built in 1932, and is a two-story-with-basement rectangular brick building in the Colonial Revival style. Frame side wings were added to Nurses' Home in 1937. The hospital was converted to a nursing home and interior remodeled in 1973.

It was listed on the National Register of Historic Places in 2002.
