= Downtown Elkin Historic District =

Historic district in North Carolina, United States

- U.S. National Register of Historic Places
- U.S. Historic district
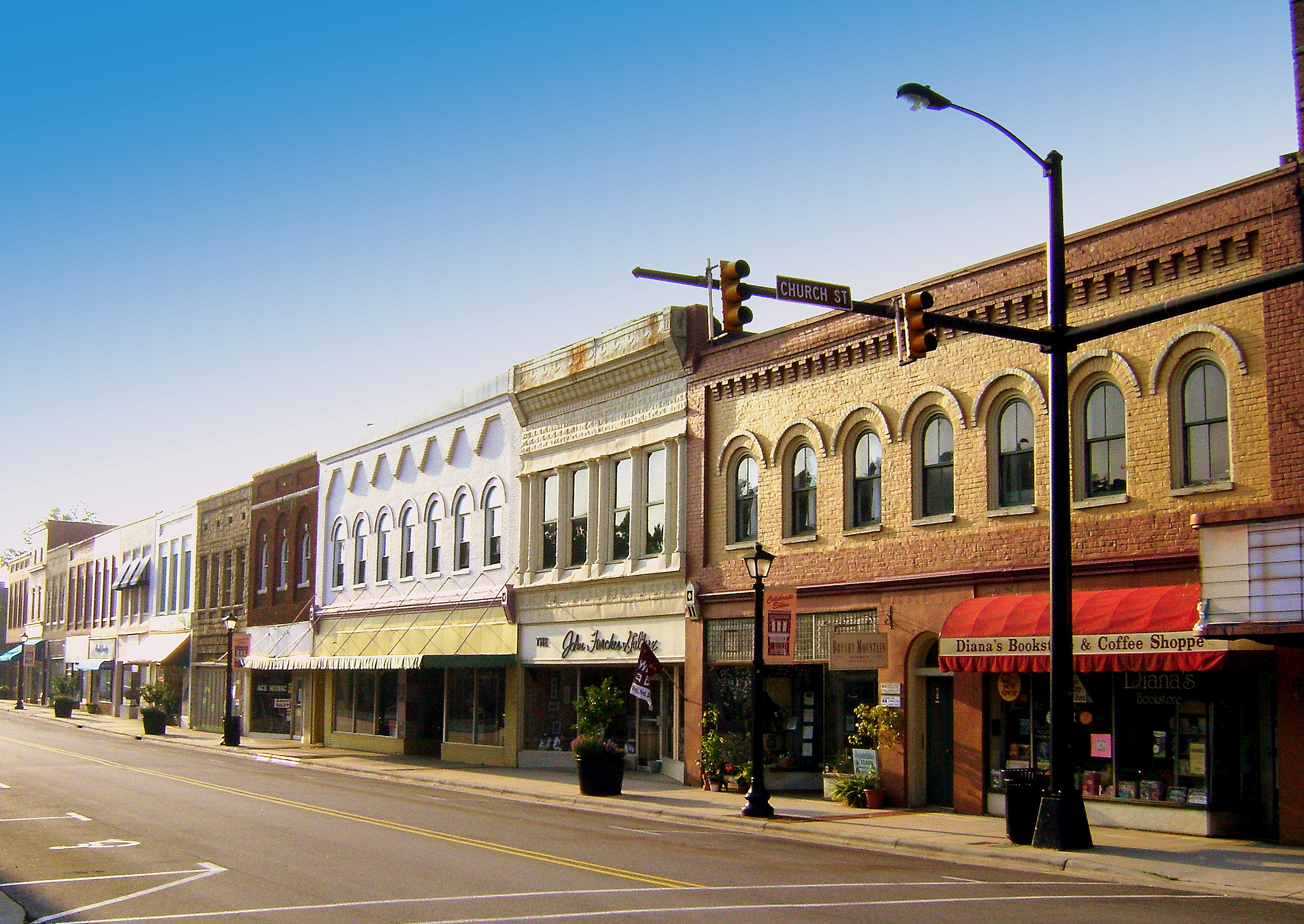
- Downtown Elkin Historic District, June 2010

- Location within North Carolina Location within the United States
- Location: Roughly bounded by Market St., Hugh Chatham Bridge, Standard St., and Front St., Elkin, North Carolina
- Coordinates: 36°14′37″N 80°51′01″W
- Area: 25 acres (10 ha)
- Built: c. 1855
- Built by: Rollins & Poindexter
- Architect: Simon, Louis A.
- Architectural style: Early Commercial, Bungalow/craftsman, et.al.
- NRHP reference No.: 00001292
- Added to NRHP: November 1, 2000

Downtown Elkin Historic District is a national historic district located at Elkin, Surry County, North Carolina. The district encompasses 51 contributing buildings and 2 contributing structures in the central business district of Elkin. They were primarily built between about 1890 and 1950 and include notable examples of Early Commercial and Bungalow / American Craftsman architecture. Notable buildings and structures include the Gwyn-Foard House (c. 1855), Hugh G. Chatham Bridge (1931), Liberty Tobacco Warehouse (c. 1920), Harris Building (1902), U.S. Post Office (1937) designed by the Office of the Supervising Architect under Louis A. Simon, former Elkin Town Hall (1938–1939) built by the Works Progress Administration, Dobbin's Store (c. 1940), and the Riverside Hotel (1915–1925).

It was added to the National Register of Historic Places in 2000.
