= Cedar Point (Elkin, North Carolina) =

Historic house in North Carolina, United States

- U.S. National Register of Historic Places
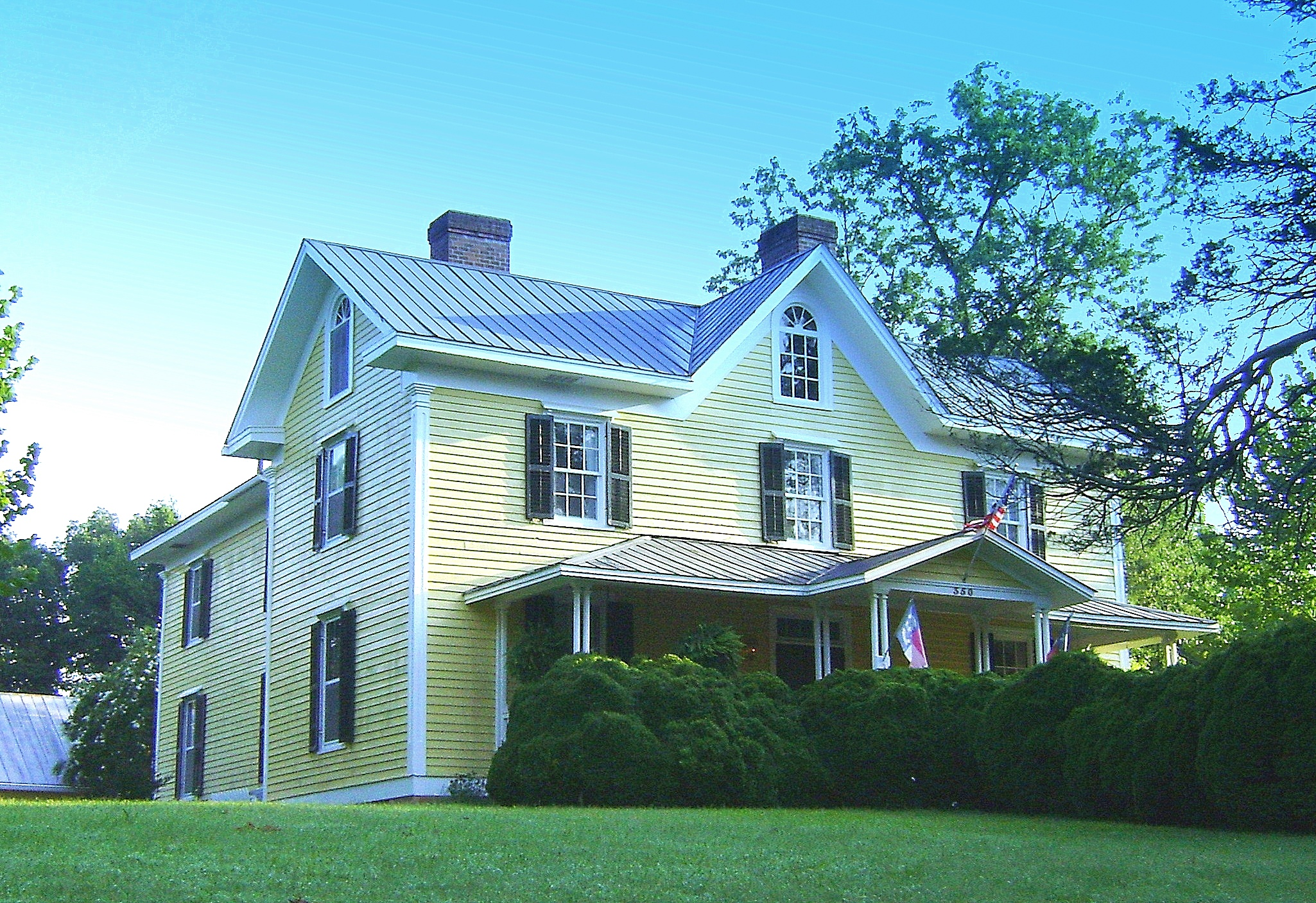
- Cedar Point, July 2010

- Location within North Carolina Location within the United States
- Location: 350 W. Main St., Elkin, North Carolina
- Coordinates: 36°14′36″N 80°51′27″W
- Area: 1.8 acres (0.73 ha)
- Built: c. 1840
- Architectural style: Greek Revival, I-house
- NRHP reference No.: 03000927
- Added to NRHP: September 11, 2003

Cedar Point, also known as the Richard Gwyn House and Richard Gwyn Franklin House, is a historic home located at Elkin, Surry County, North Carolina. It was built about 1840, and is a two-story, three-bay, Greek Revival style frame I-house. It has a two-story rear ell and rests on a brick pier foundation. It features a one-story, hip-roofed front porch with overhanging boxed eaves. It was built by Richard Gwyn (1796-1881), known as "Elkin's Founding Father."

It was listed on the National Register of Historic Places in 2003.

There is also an interesting Indian rock located in the front yard (which can be seen from the road) which still contains an attached carved bowl. Date unknown.
