= Tobón =

Tobón is a family name in Medellín, Colombia. Notable people with the name include:

- Laura Tobón (born 1990), Colombian presenter
- Miguel Tobón (born 1968) Colombian tennis player
- Pablo Tobón Uribe (1882–1954) Colombian businessman
- Ricardo Tobón Restrepo (born 1951), archbishop of Medellín

== See also ==
- Pablo Tobón Uribe Hospital in Medellín, Colombia
- Teatro Pablo Tobón Uribe, a theatre in Medellín
- Postobón, soft drink company founded 1904 Medellín, Colombia by Gabriel Posada and Valerio Tobón (whose names combine to form the name)
