= List of hospitals in Colombia =

There are 1,800 hospitals in Colombia.

75% of hospitals are public and the remaining 25% are private .

This is a list of hospitals for human medical treatment in Colombia.

== Barranquilla ==
- Hospital General de Barranquilla
- Hospital Universitario Metropolitano
- Clínica General del Norte
- Clínica Reina Catalina
- Hospital Universitario del Norte
- Clínica Bautista
- Clínica de la Costa
- Clínica del Caribe
- Clínica la Asunción
- Clínica Portoazul
- Clínica Jaller
- Clínica San Martín
- CAMINO Universitario Distrital Adelita de Char
- CAMINO Bosque de María
- CAMINO Salud Metropolitana
- CAMINO Simón Bolívar
- CAMINO Suroccidente
- CAMINO Murillo
- Clínica del Sol

== Bogotá ==
- Clínica del Bosque
- Clinica del Country
- Clinic Marly
- Clinica Nueva
- Clinica Palermo
- Clinica Partenon
- Clinica Reina Sofia
- Clinica la colina
- Fundacion Cardio Infantil
- Fundación Abood Shaio
- Fundación Hospital de la Misericordia
- Hospital El Tunal ESE
- Hospital de Engativá ESE
- Hospital de San Jose
- Clínica de la mujer
- Hospital Infantil Universitario de San Jose
- Hospital Meissen ESE
- Hospital Militar Central
- Hospital San Blas ESE
- Hospital San Juan de Dios
- Hospital Simón Bolívar
- Hospital Universitario de la Samaritana ESE (HUS)
- Hospital Universitario Fundacion Santa Fe de Bogota
- Hospital Universitario Nacional de Colombia (HUN)
- Hospital Universitario San Ignacio (HUSI)
- Hospital Universitario San Rafael ESE
- Hospital Universitario Santa Clara ESE
- Instituto Nacional de Cancerología ESE
- Hospital Materno Infantil ESE

== Bucaramanga ==
- Hospital Universitario de Santander HUS ESE
- Hospital Universitario de Bucaramanga - Los Comuneros
- Clinica Chicamocha
- Centro de Cáncer Virgilio Galvis
- Instituto del Corazón de Floridablanca(Fundación Cardiovascular de Colombia)
- Fundación Oftalmológica de Santander - Clínica Carlos Ardila Lülle

== Cali ==
- Clínica Fundación Valle de Lili
- Hospital Universitario del Valle "Evaristo García"
- Centro Médico Imbanaco
- Clínica Nuestra Señora de los Remedios
- Clínica Nuestra Señora del Rosario
- Hospital Infantil Club Noel
- Hospital Isaías Duarte Cancino
- Hospital Departamental Mario Correa Rengifo
- Hospital Carlos Holmes Trujillo
- Hospital Joaquín Paz Borrero
- Hospital Carlos Carmona
- Clínica Tequendama (Comfandi)
- Hospital San Juan de Dios
- Clínica Santillana
- Clínica Materno Infantil los Farallones
- Clínica Versalles
- Clínica Santiago de Cali
- Clínica Rafael Uribe Uribe (Universidad Libre-Comfenalco)
- Clínica San Fernando
- Clínica Oriente
- Clínica DIME Neurocardiovascular
- Clínica de Occidente
- Clínica Sebastián de Belalcázar (Colsanitas)
- Clínica SaludCoop
- Clínica Comfenalco
- Clínica Amiga (Comfandi)
- Clínica de Oftalmología de Cali S.A.
- Hospital Departamental Psiquiátrico Universitario del Valle

== Cartagena ==
- Hospital Infantil Napoleón Franco Pareja
- Hospital Universitario del Caribe
- FIRE Fundación Centro Colombiano De Epilepsia
- Hospital Naval
- Clínica Maternidad Rafael Calvo

== Chía ==
- Clínica Universidad de la Sabana

== Cúcuta ==
- Hospital Erasmo Meoz
- Clínica San José
- PoliClínico Juan Atalaya
- Clínica De Leones
- Clínica Saludcoop Cúcuta
- Corporación Socorro Médico Santa Fe Ltda
- Clínica Del Norte

== Ibagué ==
- Clínica Minerva
- Clínica Tolima
- Hospital Federico Lleras Acosta ESE
- Hospital San Francisco ESE
- Instituto del Corazón de Ibagué (FCV)

== Manizales ==
- Clinica Manizales
- Instituto del Corazón de Manizales (FCV)
- Clinica de la Presentacion
- Hospital Santa Sofia
- Hospital de Caldas
- Hospital Infantil (hospital)

== Medellín ==
- Clínica Cardiovascular Santa María
- Clinica del Sur
- Clínica El Rosario
- Clínica Las Américas
- Clínica Las Vegas
- Clínica León XIII
- Clínica Medellín
- Clínica Soma
- Clínica Universitaria Bolivariana
- Hospital General de Medellín
- Pablo Tobón Uribe Hospital
- Hospital Universitario San Vicente de Paúl

== Neiva ==
- Hospital Universitario Hernando Moncaleano Perdomo
- Hospital General de Neiva
- Clinica Uros
- Clinica Medilaser

== Santa Marta ==
- Instituto del Corazón de Santa Marta (FCV)

== Tuluá ==
- Hospital Departamental Tomás Uribe Uribe
- Clínica San Francisco S.A.
- Clínica Médico-quirúrgica Alvernia Ltda.
- Clínica Mariángel
