= Synthetic vaccine =

Type of vaccine

A synthetic vaccine is a vaccine consisting mainly of synthetic peptides, carbohydrates, or antigens. Such vaccines contain no live pathogens, bacterial cultures, or host cell impurities, and eliminate risks including reversion to virulence of attenuated strains, incomplete inactivation, and contamination of culture systems; they are therefore widely recognized as exhibiting significantly superior safety compared with conventional bacterially cultured vaccines. Creating vaccines synthetically has the ability to increase the speed of production. This is especially important in the event of a pandemic.

== History ==
The world's first synthetic vaccine was created in 1976 from diphtheria toxin by Louis Chedid (scientist) from the Pasteur Institute and Michael Sela from the Weizmann Institute.PNAS

In 1986, Manuel Elkin Patarroyo created the SPf66, the first version of a synthetic vaccine for Malaria.

During the H1N1 outbreak in 2009, vaccines only became available in large quantities after the peak of human infections. This was a learning experience for vaccination companies. Novartis Vaccine and Diagnostics, among other companies, developed a synthetic approach that very rapidly generates vaccine viruses from sequence data in order to be able to administer vaccinations early in the pandemic outbreak. Philip Dormatizer, the leader of viral vaccine research at Novartis, says they have "developed a way of chemically synthesizing virus genomes and growing them in tissue culture cells".

Phase I data of UB-311, a synthetic peptide vaccine targeting amyloid beta, showed that the drug was able to generate antibodies to specific amyloid beta oligomers and fibrils with no decrease in antibody levels in patients of advanced age. Results from the Phase II trial are expected in the second half of 2018.
