= Gideon Oliver =

1989 American mystery TV series

- Genre: Mystery
- Created by: Dick Wolf
- Based on: Gideon Oliver by Aaron Elkins
- Starring: Louis Gossett Jr. Shari Headley
- Opening theme: Theme music by Mike Post and Stephen James Taylor
- Country of origin: United States
- No. of episodes: 5

Production
- Running time: 120 minutes

Original release
- Network: ABC
- Release: February 20 – May 22, 1989

Gideon Oliver is a prime time television series that ran on the ABC television network between February 1989 and May 1989 as part of the ABC Mystery Movie rotation, along with B.L. Stryker and Columbo. On the air for only five episodes, the series starred Louis Gossett Jr., and was created by Dick Wolf. The title character first appeared in the novel series by mystery writer Aaron Elkins.

== Overview ==
Oliver is a Columbia University anthropology professor, utilizing his knowledge of past cultures to solve crimes throughout the Western Hemisphere. He is assisted by his adult daughter Zina (Shari Headley).

== List of episodes ==
No.	Title	Original release date
1	"Sleep Well, Professor Oliver"	February 20, 1989
Notable guest stars: Cynthia Nixon, Anthony LaPaglia.
2	"Tongs"	March 13, 1989
Notable guest stars: John Amos, Russell Wong.
3	"The Last Plane from Coramaya"	April 10, 1989
Notable guest stars: Sam Hennings, Julie Carmen.
4	"By the Waters of Babylon"	April 24, 1989
Notable guest stars: Madge Sinclair, Eriq La Salle.
5	"Kennonite"	May 22, 1989
Notable guest stars: Melissa Leo, John de Lancie.
