= Charlotte Elkins =

American author

- Born: July 4, 1948 (age 78); Houston, Texas
- Education: BA Cal State Hayward; MLS San Jose State
- Spouse: Aaron Elkins
- Writing career
- Pen name: Emily Spenser
- Language: English
- Genre: Mystery
- Website: www.aaronelkins.com

Charlotte Elkins (pen name, Emily Spenser; born July 4, 1948) is an American author who teamed with her husband, writer Aaron Elkins, to write a series of mystery novels about Lee Ofsted, a struggling female professional golfer.

== Biography ==
Elkins was born in Houston, Texas, but her father was an itinerant carpenter and the family moved frequently, living mostly in the southwest and Southern California. After graduating from Orange High School in 1966, she worked her way through college getting her B.A. in art in 1972 and a secondary teaching credential in 1974 from California State University, Hayward, and a M.L.S. in 1979 from San Jose State University.

She married Aaron Elkins December 29, 1972. Before becoming a full-time writer, she was a self-employed artist, secondary school teacher, and the librarian of American art at the M.H. de Young Museum in San Francisco, California in 1980-81.

== Writing career ==
Elkins started her career in 1981 writing five mass-market romance novels for Mills & Boon/Harlequin under the pseudonym Emily Spenser, which were translated and sold in over a dozen countries. But she had always wanted to collaborate on a mystery with her husband, an established mystery writer. At first she had difficulty creating a character they would both find engaging. The inspiration came by chance. They were living near a United States Air Force base in Germany while Aaron was teaching in the University of Maryland's overseas program for the American military, when they had an opportunity to take golfing lessons on the base. Charlotte, who loved the golf-themed stories by P.G. Wodehouse, suddenly realized a novice pro golfer would make an interesting protagonist in an amateur detective novel and Lee Ofsted was born.

A Wicked Slice was published in 1989, Publishers Weekly called it an "engagingly humorous thriller." Encouraged, over the years, the Elkins wrote four more Lee Ofsteds: Rotten Lies (1995), Nasty Breaks (1997), Where have all the Birdies Gone? (2004), and On the Fringe (2005). In between they wrote short stories, one of which, "Nice Gorilla," won the Agatha Award for best short story of the year in 1992. In 1996, they co-authored the "Cumberland Cup Mystery Game," the first plot for Time Warner Electronic Publishing's Modus Operandi.
