= Pablo Tobón Uribe Hospital =

Hospital in Colombia

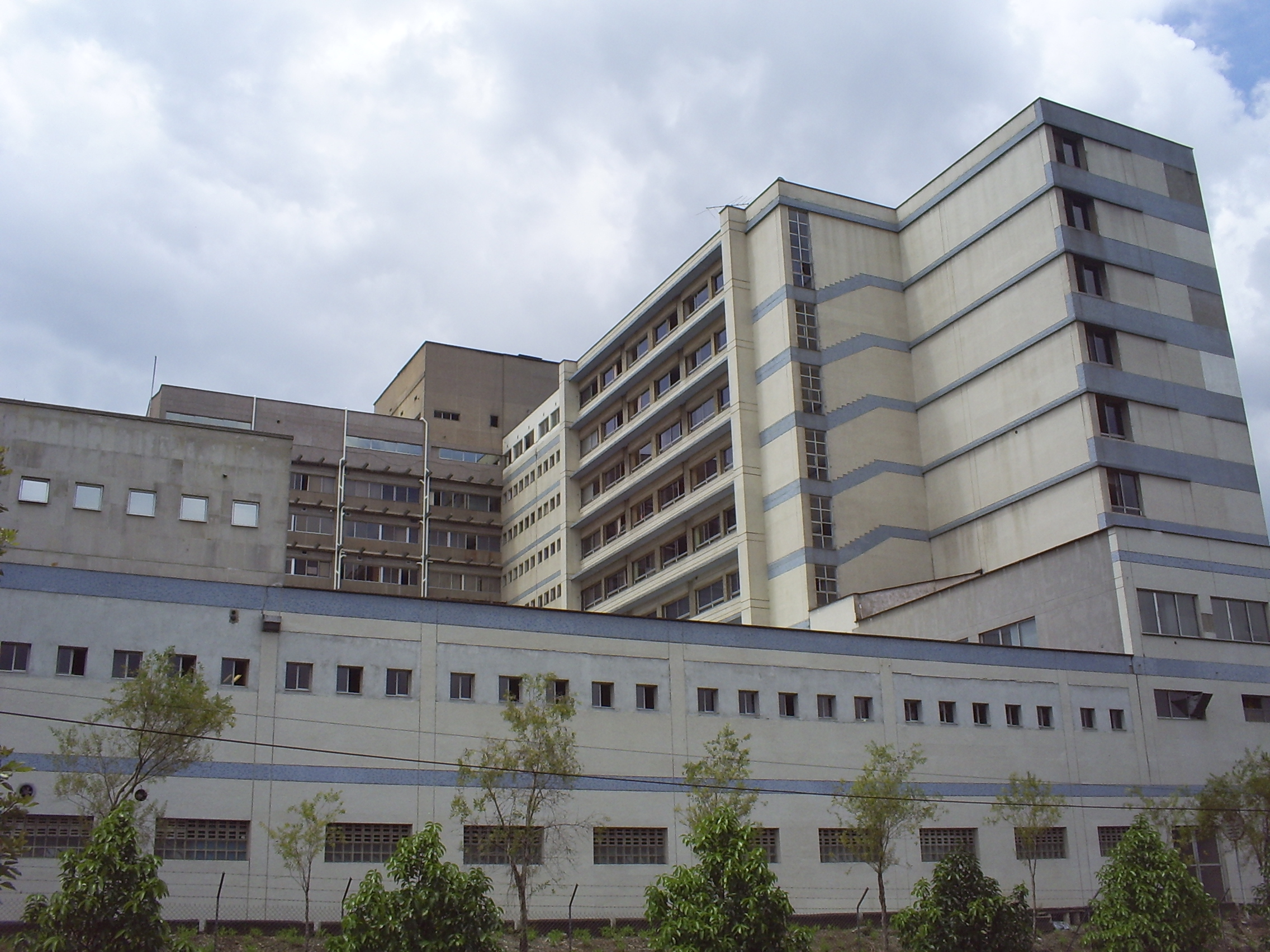

Geography
- Location: Calle 78b #NO. 69 - 240, Medellín, Antioquia, Colombia
- Coordinates: 6.277100°N 75.579736°W

Organisation
- Type: General, Teaching
- Religious affiliation: Catholic
- Patron: Pablo Tobón Uribe

Services
- Standards: Joint Commission International

Links
- Website: www.hptu.org.co
- Lists: Hospitals in Colombia

Pablo Tobón Uribe Hospital is a private, non-profit hospital located in the Cordoba neighborhood and Robledo municipality of Medellín, Colombia. It is one of the most important health institutions in Colombia. It is a Catholic Hospital, and is governed by the principles and teachings of the Catholic Church. It is named after Pablo Tobón Uribe, a Colombian businessman and philanthropist.

Pablo Tobon Uribe Hospital is also a university hospital in character. Students receive training in medicine, nursing, nutrition, psychology, microbiology and administrative agreement with different universities in the city and country areas.
