= Elkin (name) =

Elkin is both a surname and a given name. Notable people with the name include:

Surname:

- A. P. Elkin (1891–1979), Australian anthropologist
- Carrie Elkin (born 1974), singer and musician
- John P. Elkin (1860–1915), Pennsylvania Attorney General, Supreme Court justice
- Luke Elkin (born 2002), American football player
- Saul Elkin (1932–2025), American actor and director
- Stanley Elkin (1930–1995), novelist
- Stanley Edward Elkin (1880–1960), businessman
- William Lewis Elkin (1855–1933), astronomer
- Zac Elkin (born 1991), South African cricketer
- Ze'ev Elkin (born 1971), politician

Given name:

- Elkin Barrera (born 1971), cyclist
- Elkin Blanco (born 1989), footballer
- Elkin Murillo (born 1977), footballer
- Elkin Serna (born 1985), Paralympian
- Elkin Soto (born 1980), footballer

== See also ==
- Charles Elkin Mathews (1851–1921), bookseller
- Manuel Elkin Patarroyo (born 1946), pathologist
