= Manuel Elkin Patarroyo =

Colombian scientist (1946–2025)

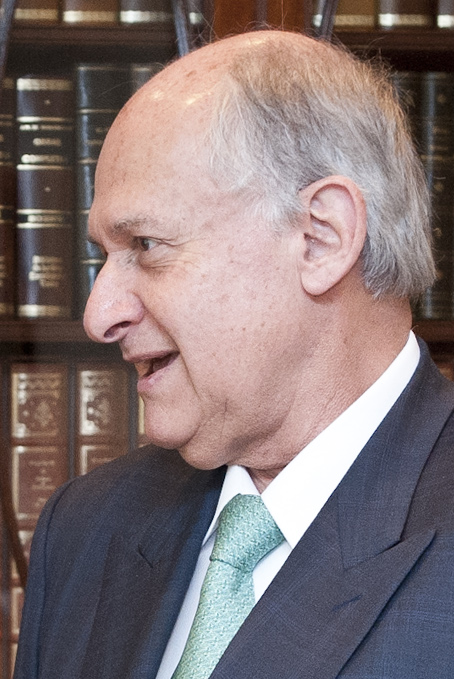
- Born: Manuel Elkin Patarroyo Murillo; November 3, 1946; Ataco, Tolima, Colombia
- Died: January 9, 2025 (aged 78); Bogotá, Colombia
- Education: National University of Colombia (MD)
- Known for: SPf66 Malaria vaccine
- Medical career
- Profession: Physician-scientist
- Institutions: Hospital San Juan de Dios; National University of Colombia
- Sub-specialties: Pathologist
- Research: Immunology
- Awards: Prince of Asturias Awards (1994); Robert Koch Prize (1994)

Manuel Elkin Patarroyo Murillo (November 3, 1946 – January 9, 2025) was a Colombian immunologist, pathologist and academic who was Professor of Pathology and Immunology. He was behind the world's first attempt to create a synthetic vaccine against the protozoal parasite Plasmodium falciparum, the cause of severe malaria, and which is responsible for the death of ~1.5 million people per year in tropical and subtropical regions, including parts of the Americas, Asia, and Africa.

The vaccine candidate, first developed in 1987 in Colombia, was evaluated in clinical trials carried out by the WHO in Gambia, Tanzania and Thailand, and had mixed results. In 2009, a comprehensive Cochrane review assessed the SPf66 as being not efficacious in Africa and Asia, and as having a low but statistically significant efficacy of 28% in South America. Researchers and vaccine developers have been working on many approaches to bring forward the availability of a malaria vaccine." More research and clinical trials are required for implementing a universal vaccine.

Patarroyo was a recipient of the TWAS Prize (1998).

== Early life ==
Patarroyo was born in Ataco, Tolima, Colombia on November 3, 1946.

== Scientific work ==
Patarroyo started experimenting with animals in the 1980s, paying for wild monkeys captured in the Amazonian rainforest generating illegal traffic carried on by indigenous people who hunt the elusive monkeys for sale.

The Corporation for the Sustainable Development of the South of the Amazon (Corpoamazonía), has opened a file (number 000102) for complaints about irregularities committed by the FIDIC (Fundación Instituto de Inmunología de Colombia) research team led by Manuel Elkin Patarroyo. The Ministry of Environment, Housing and Territorial Development of Colombia carried out an investigation motivated by the Corpoamazonía denunciations, which there were evidenced within the facilities of the FIDIC 627 monkeys of the species Aotus nancymaae [Night_monkey], which had only been registered in Brazil and Peru and not in Colombian territory. The export of these animals was not registered in the permits of the administrative authorities. For 2008, the alleged illegal trade in this animal species is under investigation by the Colombian government against the FIDIC. In 2012 the Administrative Court of Cundinamarca in Colombia revoked the permits to experiment with 4,000 night monkeys (Aotus trivirgatus) for Patarroyo's jungle laboratory but in March 2015 the decision was reversed and the experiments with primates were allowed to continue.

In April 2016, Patarroyo was awarded the honorary doctorate from the Ricardo Palma University, in whose official ceremony there was a controversy against defenders of the biodiversity of Peruvian wildlife. He, using in its clinical trials species of green-tailed monkeys Aotus nancymaae, using more than 4000 specimens, which returned to its wild state without spleen, deprived of the immune system, reason why it was recriminated in the mentioned act. The ecologists supported their accusations based on allegations in SERFOR of Peru, for which the investigator had no response.

In November 2016 a Colombian journalistic investigation revealed the traffic and the environmental impact of Patarroyo's investigation.

== Death ==
Patarroyo died in Bogotá on January 9, 2025, at the age of 78.
