= Elkin Township, Surry County, North Carolina =

Township in Surry County, North Carolina, U.S.

Coordinates: 36.2789464°N 80.8322428°W

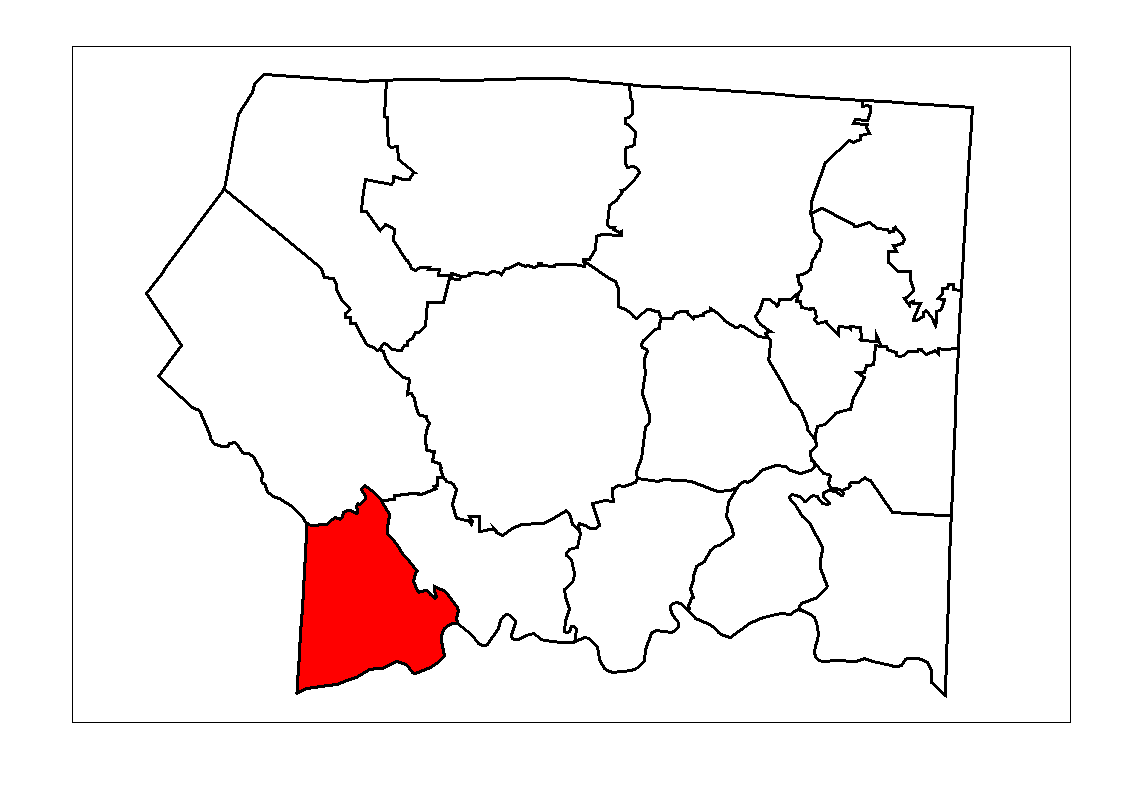
Location of Elkin Township in Surry County, N.C.

Elkin Township is one of fifteen townships in Surry County, North Carolina, United States. The township had a population of 8,283 according to the 2020 census.

Geographically, Elkin Township occupies 21.3 square miles (55 km^{2}) in southwestern Surry County. Elkin Township's southern border is the Yadkin River. The only incorporated municipality within Elkin Township is the Town of Elkin, the second largest municipality in Surry County.
