= Ataco =

Coordinates: 3°36′N 75°23′W

- Municipality and town
- Flag Coat of arms

- Location of the municipality and town of Ataco in the Tolima Department of Colombia.
- Country: Colombia
- Department: Tolima Department

Government
  - Mayor: Jader Armel Ochoa Mappe

Area
  - Total: 996.82 km^{2} (384.87 sq mi)
- Elevation: 446 m (1,463 ft)

Population (Census 2018)
  - Total: 13,470
  - Density: 13.51/km^{2} (35.00/sq mi)
- Time zone: UTC-5 (Colombia Standard Time)

Ataco is a town and municipality located in the Tolima department of Colombia. The population of the municipality was 13,470 in the 2018 census.

The Colombian state has been accused of human rights violations in Ataco.

== Climate ==
Climate data for Ataco (Mesa de Pole), elevation 500 m (1,600 ft), (1981–2010)
Month	Jan	Feb	Mar	Apr	May	Jun	Jul	Aug	Sep	Oct	Nov	Dec	Year
Mean daily maximum °C (°F)	31.1 (88.0)	31.5 (88.7)	31.0 (87.8)	31.0 (87.8)	31.1 (88.0)	31.4 (88.5)	31.9 (89.4)	33.0 (91.4)	32.9 (91.2)	31.3 (88.3)	30.3 (86.5)	30.5 (86.9)	31.4 (88.5)
Daily mean °C (°F)	26.1 (79.0)	26.2 (79.2)	26.0 (78.8)	25.9 (78.6)	26.1 (79.0)	26.2 (79.2)	26.6 (79.9)	27.1 (80.8)	27.0 (80.6)	26.0 (78.8)	25.7 (78.3)	25.7 (78.3)	26.2 (79.2)
Mean daily minimum °C (°F)	20.1 (68.2)	20.1 (68.2)	20.3 (68.5)	20.4 (68.7)	20.3 (68.5)	20.2 (68.4)	20.0 (68.0)	20.1 (68.2)	20.0 (68.0)	20.0 (68.0)	20.1 (68.2)	20.2 (68.4)	20.2 (68.4)
Average precipitation mm (inches)	206.9 (8.15)	200.3 (7.89)	247.9 (9.76)	255.0 (10.04)	215.5 (8.48)	88.1 (3.47)	65.2 (2.57)	67.3 (2.65)	140.1 (5.52)	334.9 (13.19)	314.7 (12.39)	250.8 (9.87)	2,367.9 (93.22)
Average precipitation days	16	15	17	19	18	12	10	10	12	20	21	19	186
Average relative humidity (%)	76	76	77	78	77	76	74	72	72	75	77	77	76
Mean monthly sunshine hours	142.6	121.4	124.0	114.0	127.1	138.0	139.5	139.5	129.0	120.9	123.0	136.4	1,555.4
Mean daily sunshine hours	4.6	4.3	4.0	3.8	4.1	4.6	4.5	4.5	4.3	3.9	4.1	4.4	4.3
Source: Instituto de Hidrologia Meteorologia y Estudios Ambientales
