= Elkin, North Carolina =

- Town
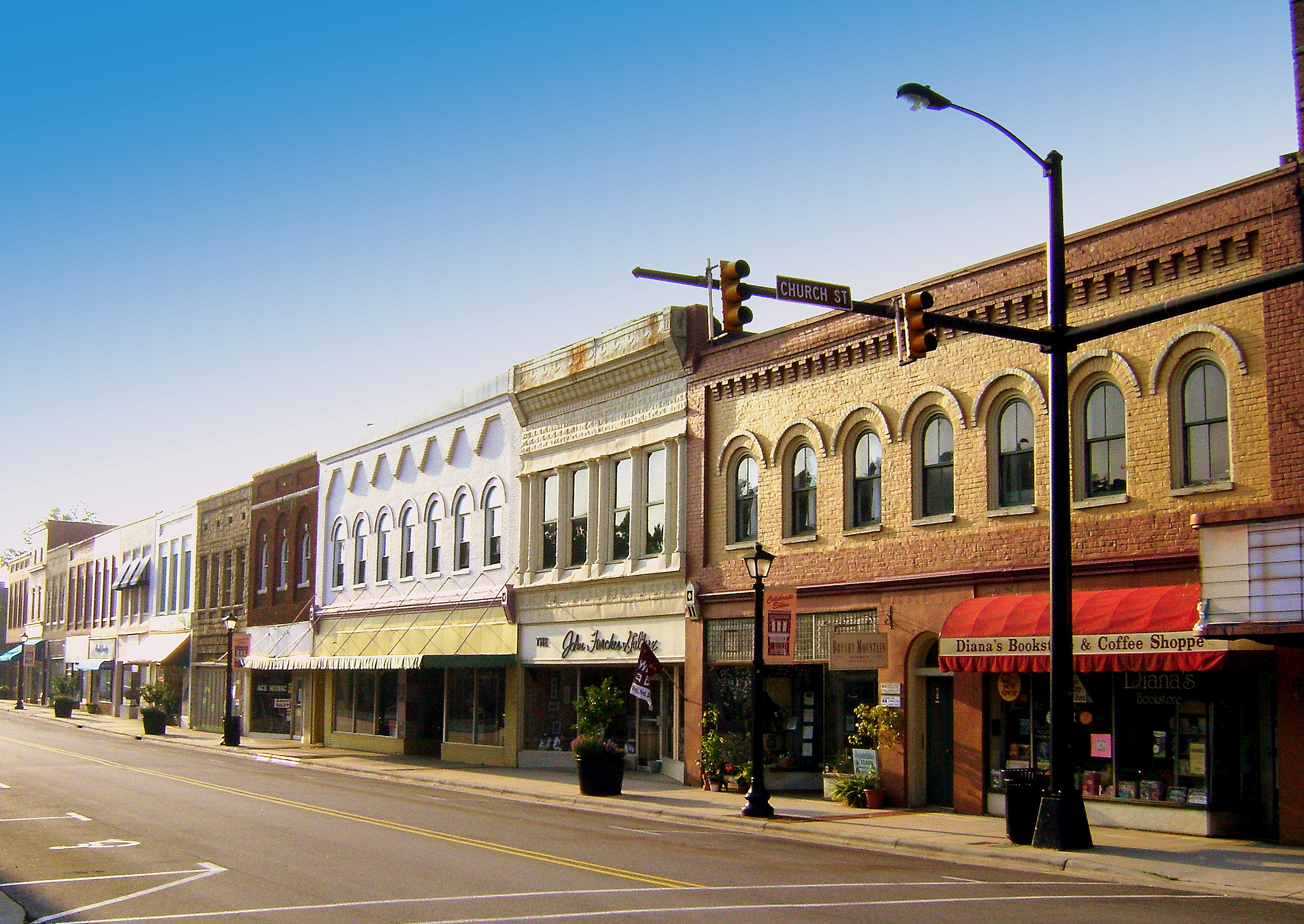
- Downtown Elkin

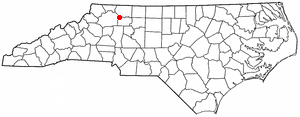
- Location of Elkin, North Carolina
- Coordinates: 36°15′43″N 80°50′39″W
- Country: United States
- State: North Carolina
- Counties: Surry, Wilkes
- Incorporated: March 5, 1889

Government
  - Mayor: Sam Bishop (D)
  - Town Manager: Brent Cornelison

Area
  - Total: 6.88 sq mi (17.81 km^{2})
  - Land: 6.79 sq mi (17.59 km^{2})
  - Water: 0.085 sq mi (0.22 km^{2})
- Elevation: 1,086 ft (331 m)

Population (2020)
  - Total: 4,122
  - Estimate (2025): 4,088
  - Density: 607.1/sq mi (234.39/km^{2})
- Time zone: UTC-5 (Eastern (EST))
  - Summer (DST): UTC-4 (EDT)
- ZIP code: 28621
- Area code: 336
- FIPS code: 37-20620
- GNIS feature ID: 2406436
- Website: www.elkinnc.org

Elkin is a town in Surry and Wilkes counties in the U.S. state of North Carolina, along the Yadkin River. Elkin shares its name with the surrounding township of Elkin Township. The population was 4,122 at the time of the 2020 census.

== Geography ==
According to the United States Census Bureau, the town has a total area of 6.3 square miles (16.4 km^{2}), of which 6.2 square miles (16.2 km^{2}) is land and 0.1 square mile (0.2 km^{2}) (1.10%) is water. The town also stretches westward beyond Leaf Street across the Wilkes County line.

Elkin is approximately 15 minutes south of Stone Mountain State Park, and 20 minutes from the entrance of the Blue Ridge Parkway off Hwy 21 (heading towards Sparta). Elkin enjoys mild weather patterns and extremely clean air. Its downtown is also situated along the Yadkin River, and offers a paddlers boat ramp and small camp site. Six local outfitters provide supplies for anyone interested in floating on the Yadkin to or from Elkin.

There are also numerous vineyards in the Yadkin Valley area (over 40 in and around Elkin), and the Yadkin Valley Wine Festival is held each May at the Elkin Municipal Park, which is situated along Big Elkin Creek, a tributary of the Yadkin River. Elkin is centrally located in the Yadkin Valley Wine Region (a certified American Viticulture Area). Elkin also has two microbreweries and a craft brewery festival each fall called The Big Elkin Brewfest. It is held in the Municipal Park, which was a mustering field during the American Revolution. Elkin was the easternmost encampment along the Overmountain Victory Trail and there is a marker at the park near the recreation center along Hwy 268.

Trails are abundant in Elkin, including the Overmountain Victory Trail, the North Carolina Mountains to Sea Trail (NC MST), and the Yadkin River State Park 'Blue' Trail. Elkin is considered an official Trail Town as the NC MST is now directed into downtown Elkin along Main St. A local volunteer group (elkinvalleytrails.org) is responsible for grooming over 24 miles of the trail from Elkin to Stone Mountain State Park. The group works on the E&A Rail Trail, which boasts mountain bike trails, walking trails, and trout fishing, all beginning at the Elkin Municipal Park. There is also a golf cart rental at the Rec Center for handicapped individuals to enjoy the trails.

=== Climate ===
Climate data for Elkin, North Carolina (1991–2020)
Month	Jan	Feb	Mar	Apr	May	Jun	Jul	Aug	Sep	Oct	Nov	Dec	Year
Mean daily maximum °F (°C)	48.7 (9.3)	52.4 (11.3)	60.3 (15.7)	70.0 (21.1)	77.2 (25.1)	84.3 (29.1)	87.1 (30.6)	85.8 (29.9)	80.3 (26.8)	71.3 (21.8)	60.7 (15.9)	51.5 (10.8)	69.1 (20.6)
Daily mean °F (°C)	35.9 (2.2)	38.4 (3.6)	45.5 (7.5)	54.9 (12.7)	64.0 (17.8)	72.2 (22.3)	75.9 (24.4)	74.5 (23.6)	68.6 (20.3)	56.8 (13.8)	46.2 (7.9)	39.0 (3.9)	56.0 (13.3)
Mean daily minimum °F (°C)	23.0 (−5.0)	24.3 (−4.3)	30.7 (−0.7)	39.8 (4.3)	50.8 (10.4)	60.0 (15.6)	64.7 (18.2)	63.1 (17.3)	56.8 (13.8)	42.3 (5.7)	31.6 (−0.2)	26.4 (−3.1)	42.8 (6.0)
Average precipitation inches (mm)	4.00 (102)	2.99 (76)	3.93 (100)	4.45 (113)	4.50 (114)	4.60 (117)	5.01 (127)	4.55 (116)	4.32 (110)	3.54 (90)	3.15 (80)	3.99 (101)	49.03 (1,246)
Average snowfall inches (cm)	1.4 (3.6)	0.5 (1.3)	0.2 (0.51)	0.0 (0.0)	0.0 (0.0)	0.0 (0.0)	0.0 (0.0)	0.0 (0.0)	0.0 (0.0)	0.0 (0.0)	0.0 (0.0)	0.9 (2.3)	3 (7.71)
Source: NOAA

== Demographics ==
Historical population
Census	Pop.	Note	%±
1880	137		—
1890	288		110.2%
1900	860		198.6%
1910	886		3.0%
1920	1,195		34.9%
1930	2,357		97.2%
1940	2,734		16.0%
1950	2,842		4.0%
1960	2,868		0.9%
1970	2,899		1.1%
1980	2,858		−1.4%
1990	3,790		32.6%
2000	4,036		6.5%
2010	4,001		−0.9%
2020	4,122		3.0%
2025 (est.)	4,088	▼	−0.8%
U.S. Decennial Census

=== 2020 census ===
Elkin racial composition
Race	Number	Percentage
White (non-Hispanic)	3,134	76.03%
Black or African American (non-Hispanic)	208	5.05%
Native American	4	0.1%
Asian	30	0.73%
Other/Mixed	101	2.45%
Hispanic or Latino	645	15.65%

As of the 2020 census, Elkin had a population of 4,122. The median age was 45.5 years. 20.6% of residents were under the age of 18 and 26.4% were 65 years of age or older. For every 100 females there were 82.0 males, and for every 100 females age 18 and over there were 77.5 males age 18 and over.

There were 1,766 households in Elkin, of which 27.5% had children under the age of 18 living in them. Of all households, 40.5% were married-couple households, 18.9% were households with a male householder and no spouse or partner present, and 34.6% were households with a female householder and no spouse or partner present. About 39.0% of all households were made up of individuals and 21.2% had someone living alone who was 65 years of age or older. There were 1,087 families residing in the town.

There were 2,059 housing units, of which 14.2% were vacant. The homeowner vacancy rate was 3.0% and the rental vacancy rate was 10.6%. 0.0% of residents lived in urban areas, while 100.0% lived in rural areas.

=== Income and poverty ===
The median income for a household in the town was $57,711, and the median income for a family was $81,369. Males had a median income of $28,225 versus $20,647 for females. The per capita income for the town was $36,342. About 6.3% of families and 12.6% of the population were below the poverty line, including 10.6% of those under age 18 and 18.5% of those age 65 or over.

== Landmarks ==
Cedar Point, Downtown Elkin Historic District, Gwyn Avenue-Bridge Street Historic District, and the Hugh Chatham Memorial Hospital, (former) are listed on the National Register of Historic Places.

== Education ==
Elkin is served by the Elkin City Schools system. It currently ranks among the top 5 schools in North Carolina. It operates an elementary school (grades 1–6) with a population of approximately 700, a middle school (grades 7–8) and Elkin High School (grades 9–12) with approximately 384 students. The high school has had new developments made to the building; the construction of the new science, math, and CTE programs completed in the 2006–2007 school year, and the English and history building completed in 2011. Elkin will incorporate the STEAM program throughout all grades K-12. (Science, Technology, Engineering, Art, Math).

The football program captured state titles in 2002, 2003, 2005, and 2006. They also won one in 1967 as a 3A program. Elkin High has also produced numerous fencing, soccer, volleyball, tennis, swimming, and wrestling state championships.

== Transport ==
=== Highways ===
Interstate 77 passes along the eastern side of Elkin. Exit 85 provides the midpoint entrance into Elkin via Hwy 268, or CC Camp Road.

North Carolina Highway 67 You can also enter Elkin by exiting off NC 67 (exit 82 at Jonesville), then heading west on NC 67 until crossing over the Yadkin River (this becomes old Business Hwy 21). At this point, you'll be entering the historic downtown district at Elkin's southern border where you'll find Main Street, with restaurants, antiques, a winery/tasting room, shops, Civil War Marker, Overmountain Victory Trail, NC Mountain-to-Sea Trail (Main Street), and a future visitor center.

U.S. Route 21 (US 21)passes through Elkin. Old Business Hwy 21 is also called Bridge Street, and intersects the entire town of Elkin from the Yadkin River up to where it joins with US 21 heading north towards State Road, then to Sparta. US 21 is the route travelers would take to access North Carolina's Stone Mountain State Park.

=== Airports ===
The town is served by Elkin Municipal Airport. Ground transportation is also available. Aircraft Maintenance is available along with Fixed Wing and rotorcraft flight instruction.

Commercial flights are available through Piedmont Triad International Airport in Greensboro and Charlotte Douglas International Airport.

== Local media ==
=== Print ===
The Tribune, a community newspaper published on Mondays, Wednesdays and Fridays, provides coverage of Elkin as well as nearby Jonesville and parts of Wilkes County and Yadkin County. The Winston-Salem Journal and Mount Airy News, larger daily newspapers, also cover Surry County.

=== Broadcast ===
WIFM 100.9 FM radio station broadcasts from 813 N. Bridge Street in Elkin.

Elkin is part of the Piedmont Triad radio and television market, but many broadcasts from the Charlotte market also can be received.

== Notable people ==
- Richard Thurmond Chatham – former member of the U.S. House of Representatives
- Barney Hall – former NASCAR sports commentator
- James A. Harrell III – former member of the North Carolina General Assembly
- Jeff Hayes – NFL punter, Super Bowl XVII champion with Washington Redskins
- Thomas F. Metz – retired lieutenant general in the United States Army
- Jim Popp – American sports executive
- Jerry Steele – former college basketball player and head coach, and athletic administrator
- Anna Harris Stein – First Lady of North Carolina
- Bob Stinson – MLB switch-hitting catcher

== See also ==
- List of municipalities in North Carolina
