= Hospital San Juan de Dios, Bogotá =

Hospital in Bogotá, Colombia

Coordinates: 3°27′N 76°32′W

Hospital San Juan de Dios
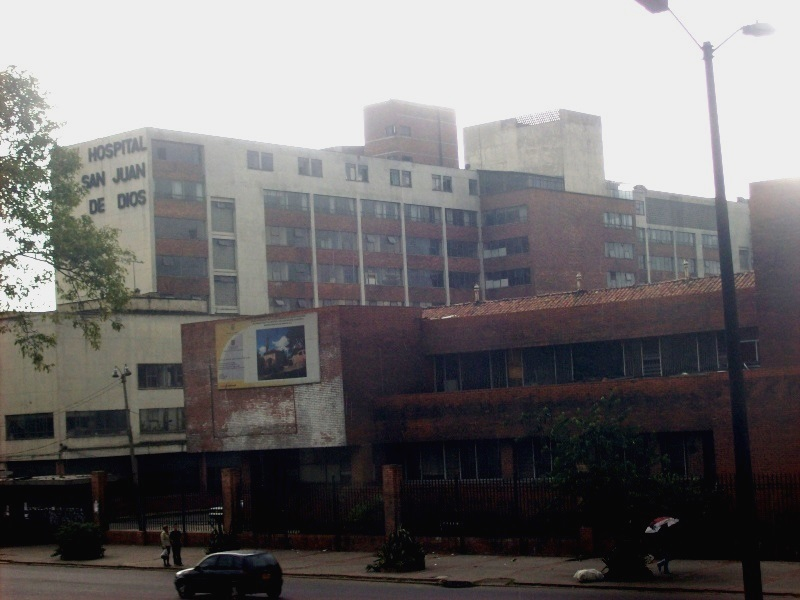

Geography
- Location: Bogotá, Colombia

Organisation
- Care system: Distrital de Salud, Distrito de Bogotá
- Affiliated university: Universidad Nacional de Colombia; National Institute of Immunology (Instituto Nacional de Inmunología)

History
- Founded: established on 1564 renamed on 1723

Links
- Lists: Hospitals in Colombia

Hospital San Juan de Dios It is a public hospital founded in 1723 in the city of Santafé, now Bogotá, although it had been providing health services since 1564.

It is one of the most important symbols in the history of medicine in Colombia and a leading center for public health and medical research.

It was closed on September 29, 2001, and a labor and ownership dispute is currently underway. The property is leased to the Bogotá Capital District through the Urban Renewal Company, which plans to build a future University Hospital of the National University of Colombia and a Level IV hospital with in the District Hospital Network on the site. This hospital would be managed by the Bogotá Health Secretariat, which in 2006 leased the facilities of the Maternal and Child Institute, which is currently 50% operated by the Hospital de la Victoria.

== History ==
=== 1564–1723 ===
The hospital was founded in 1564 out of the need for healthcare for the conquistadors and their families, freed slaves, and indigenous people suffering from illnesses caused by climatic conditions or imported bacteria, thanks to a donation made by Juan de los Barrios.

Initially named the Hospital of San Pedro, it was located behind the Primatial Cathedral of Bogotá and care was provided by Dominican and Franciscan friars, the archbishop belonged to the latter order Juan de los Barrios. These were people with certain qualities that allowed them to provide some relief to the sick, possessing a general understanding of religious mysticism and simple intuition.

The first hospital was a private convent-hospital. Its financial viability was perhaps due to the social conscience of the religious figures and some wealthy individuals who generously donated gifts and alms for its establishment and subsequent upkeep. The viceroyalty's support was minimal.

During the Spanish colonial period, every institution had to be authorized by the Royal Audiencia and the Viceroy; therefore, the establishment of the hospital had to obtain permission from the Spanish Crown, although the Crown did not participate in its initiative, maintenance, or oversight.

It formed the nucleus for the development of Colombian medicine and over time it managed to link some foreigners established in Santafé for the service of the Viceroy or as chief physicians, who little by little instilled in it a certain medical orientation.

=== "The Scientific Revolution" (1723–1899) ===
In 1739, the hospital was moved from its original location to a larger site.

San Pedro Hospital was the only institution of its kind, which, according to documents from the time, had 12 beds and whose infrastructure was not even capable of providing adequate service. The unsanitary conditions were so severe that they threatened the health of the entire city. For this reason, the Jesús, José y María Hospital was built, thanks to a royal decree issued on May 15, 1723, by King Philip V of Spain. It was built on the outskirts of the city, between what are now 11th and 12th Streets and between what are now 9th and 10th Avenues, where the Church of San Juan de Dios (Bogotá) now stands. The construction of the new hospital was made possible by the proceeds from the sale of the old cathedral grounds and contributions from the Crown.

The new Hospital of Jesus, Mary, and Joseph began with sixty beds, quickly expanding to two hundred. Its funding depended primarily on three sources: first, the budget allocated by the Spanish Crown, which was up to twice the amount given to the Royal Audiencia; second, donations from wealthy residents of the city; and finally, its own resources, consisting of productive land and commercial properties.

From its earliest years, the Hospitaller Order of Saint John of God was in charge of its administration.

In the Viceroyalty of New Granada, José Celestino Mutis, along with other researchers, conducted studies on nature. Mutis represents one of the greatest pillars of research, followed by the clergyman Miguel de la Isla, who instilled a scientific character and established the hospital as a hospital institution, creating an organization conducive to the development of clinical medicine.

During the Colombian of Independence, the Hospital, despite facing economic hardship and even under the dictatorship of Juan de Sámano, cared for numerous sick and wounded and served as a prison for patriotic doctors. At the Santa Inés Convent-Hospital, physicians had the opportunity to provide soldiers with physical relief.

At the beginning of the Republic, President Francisco de Paula Santander gave it a new direction by closing all convent-hospitals and regulating the functions of the Syndics and Stewards under the orders of the provincial governor. From then on, the hospital remained a charitable institution, owned by the State (1828), and in 1835 the Bogotá Assembly issued the guidelines, decrees, and governing boards for the Hospital, with the aim of giving it a focus on healthcare and education through the School of Medicine. This effectively expelled the Hospitaller Order; however, it is worth noting that their legacy remains, because although the Hospital's name alluded to the Holy Family, in popular parlance, since it was the monks of Saint John of God who staffed it, the hospital became known as Hospital San Juan de Dios; a name that endures to this day.

In 1869, the Sovereign State of Cundinamarca established the General Board of Charity, now the Cundinamarca Charity, placing the hospital under its administration but not its ownership. During this time of internal struggles, the Hospital located in the convent of Santa Inés achieved some progress in its organization, however it had to overcome great economic and locational difficulties to care for the large number of wounded during the wars and also the sick from the frequent epidemics.

=== “From Santa Inés to La Hortúa” (1900–1925) ===
This period took place in the first quarter of the 20th century. The Hospital entered the new century attending to countless patients resulting from the Thousand Days' War and other internal conflicts of the 19th century. Its development was influenced by the generation of graduates from France, who initiated the major medical specialties and led to the emergence of the first medical and paramedical institutions. The hospital's transformations mirrored the changes taking place in the country. In the convent-hospital, some of the most important interventions were performed for the first time in the country, such as mastectomy, cesarean section, parotidectomy, jaw resection, trepanation, splenectomy, and gastrectomy, among others.

=== The Hortúa Mill ===
President General Rafael Reyes Prieto ordered the construction of a hospital complex to relocate the San Juan de Dios Hospital and the asylums for the mentally ill and the indigent (the term used at the time for the homeless). In accordance with this plan, on August 31, 1905, the Nation purchased the property known as "Molino Tres Esquinas" or "Molino de la Hortúa," with an area of approximately 25 fanegas (approximately 25 acres), from José Domingo Ospina and Gonzalo Arboleda for the sum of 90,000 gold pesos, through a deed signed at Notary Office No. 2 in Bogotá.

Through Law 63 of 1911, the nation ceded in perpetuity to the department of Cundinamarca, for the purpose of constructing asylums and shelters for the indigent, the land known as "Molino de la Hortúa," transferring it to the Governor's Office and the General Board of Charity, now the Cundinamarca Charity. On October 31, 1919, the Congress of Colombia "authorized the department to change the designated use of the property called 'Molino de la Hortúa,' to dedicate it to the construction of a hospital, on the condition that it be an annex and complement to the existing San Juan de Dios Hospital, and that the land to be paid for by the hospital be applied to the acquisition of suitable land for the construction of asylums." The Cundinamarca Assembly issued Ordinance 48 of 1919, authorizing the Board of Charity to sell the properties of the San Juan de Dios Hospital and invest the proceeds in the construction of buildings on the Hortúa property. Ordinance 13 of 1922 specified the properties to be sold.

Finally, the Cundinamarca Assembly, through Ordinance 85 of 1920, designated the aforementioned land for the construction of a new San Juan de Dios Hospital building, to continue as an "official charitable or public assistance establishment, administered according to the ordinances of the Cundinamarca Assembly." It also authorized the Bogotá Hospice to sell or exchange with the San Juan de Dios Hospital the unfinished buildings that the former had erected on the eastern part of the Hortúa property. Law 48 of 1923 clarified Law 47 of 1919, which stipulated that the asylums for the mentally ill of both sexes and for indigent women or male beggars (beggar colony) would transfer to the aforementioned Hospital the rights corresponding to them in accordance with the 1917 deed. This law allowed the Cundinamarca Charity Board to confirm the allocation of the land for the new buildings of San Juan de Dios Hospital.

According to deed 463 of March 10, 1924, signed at the Second Notary Office, the purchase price of the Hortúa lot was $23,898.31, paid through an exchange of real estate between the Hospital's property and the property of the Asylum for the Mentally Ill. The seventh clause states «The Hospital that has been built and is to be built will henceforth be called Hortúa, it will be an annex and complement of the current Hospital of San Juan de Dios and will be an integral part of the same legal entity. Consequently, the San Juan de Dios Hospital of Bogotá, in its buildings in La Hortúa, will continue to be an official establishment of public charity or assistance. Furthermore, all aid, donations, inheritances, or bequests henceforth assigned to the Hospital in La Hortúa will be made to the San Juan de Dios Hospital of Bogotá in its buildings in La Hortúa, as these will form an integral part of the same legal entity.

After providing healthcare services for 203 years, on February 7, 1925, it moved to La Hortúa, to the eastern pavilion, where the Maternal and Child Institute currently operates. There, it began offering Gynecology services (58 beds), which had been founded in 1887; Tropical Medicine; Urology; and Dermatology, which had begun in 1910 and was expanded into a full pavilion to serve patients of both sexes.

=== “The Golden Age” (1926–1979) ===
This period began with the establishment of the hospital on the grounds of La Hortúa between 1925 and 1926, under the direction of the Board of Charity and the scientific guidance of the National University of Colombia. At Carrera 9, the necessary resources and proper hospital infrastructure were lacking, and scientific progress was very slow, almost stagnant due to internal conflicts and the formation of the nation. Medical care was severely deficient in scientific, hygienic, and economic aspects.

Around 1926, the country enjoyed an atmosphere of peace and economic progress, which allowed many of its doctors to travel to Europe and bring back new medical and architectural ideas. In 1926, as Colombia began its journey toward industrialization, the first surgery was performed in the new hospital facilities.

From that moment on, the San Juan de Dios Hospital took on a unique dynamic, becoming one of the most important centers for medical research and training in Colombia. Until the mid-20th century, it was practically the only university hospital in the City of Bogotá, affiliated with the Faculty of Medicine of the National University. From 1979 to 1999, it was managed by the private entity "San Juan de Dios Foundation" in partnership with the Faculty of Medicine of the National University.

In 1993, the hospital began its decline due to Law 100 of Colombia's Social Security Law, which culminated in its intervention and closure between 1999 and 2001, as it was deemed financially unviable.

Since the enactment of Law 100, the hospital's resources were insufficient, and it frequently suffered alarming economic crises that led to the partial suspension of its services. Through Law 735 of 2002, it was declared, along with the Maternal and Child Institute, a National Historical and Cultural Heritage Site for its significant contributions throughout different periods of Colombian history.

=== Crisis ===
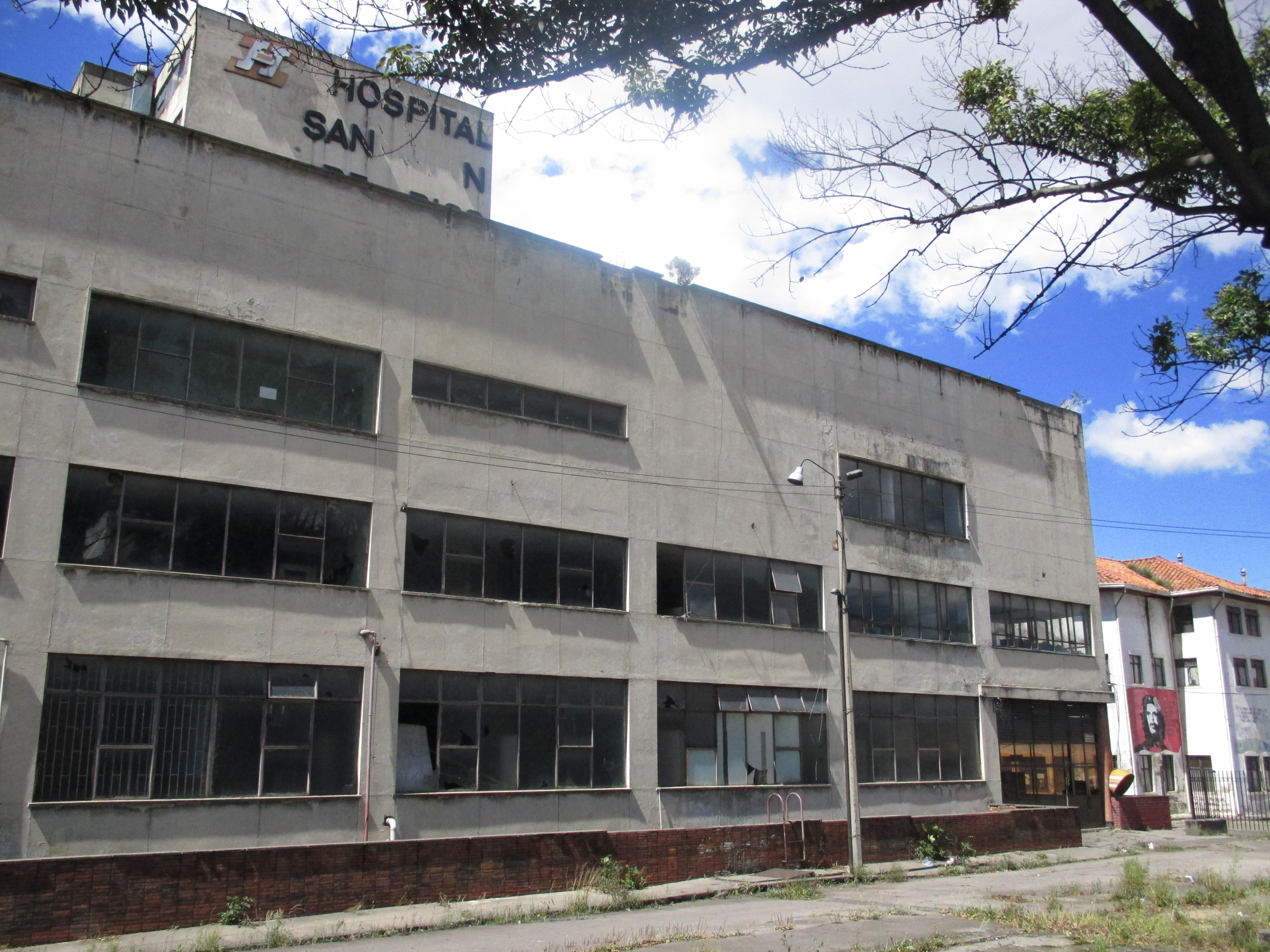
The hospital in January 2015.

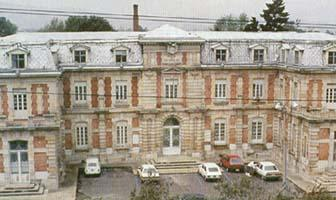
Former National Institute of Immunology. Administrative Building later assigned to the Instituto Nacional de Inmunología. Part of the San Juan de Dios Buildings Complex.

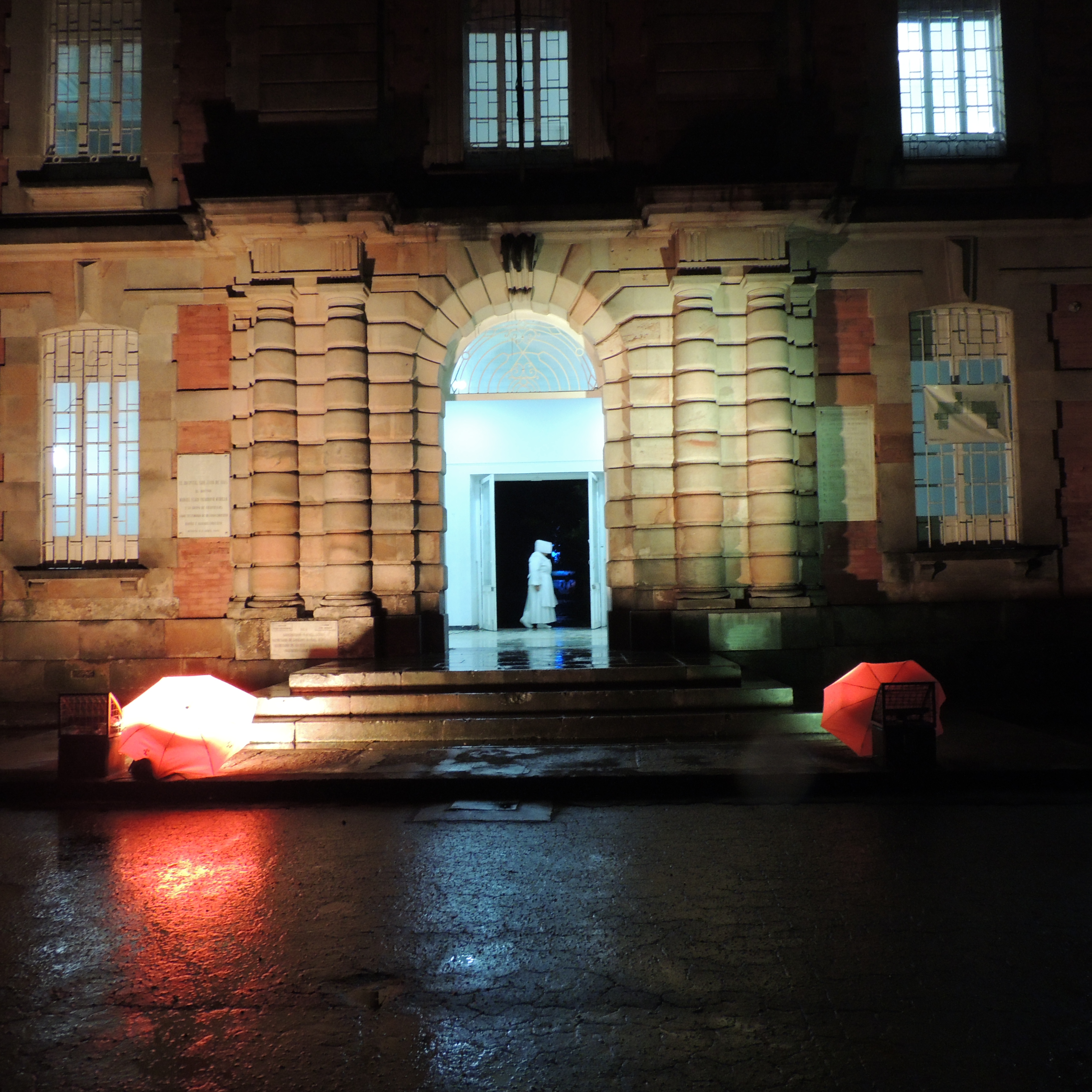
Main access of the National Institute of Immunology November 2022.

This hospital was the epicenter of several research institutions in various branches of medicine. Among the most important were the neonatal unit of the Maternal and Child Institute, where the Kangaroo Mother Care method was created in 1978. This method helped solve many of the survival problems of premature infants and was a pioneering program and a model worldwide. Other important institutions included the pathology ward, Bogotá's first plastic surgery ward, and the National Immunological Institute, where Manuel Elkin Patarroyo was affiliated.

In August 2012, former Bogotá mayor Gustavo Petro initiated a phased reopening plan to transform the hospital into a level four facility for the populations of central and southern Bogotá. The first stage consists of the opening of the Primary Care Unit located on Carrera 10 with Calle Primera, in the Health Center, in the building next to the San Juan de Dios Hospital. In December 2012, a partial severance payment was made to retired hospital employees, several employees were rehired, and the first phase of the hospital reopened. This phase was later closed, and the hospital remained mired in crisis.

During the first phase of the hospital's reopening, the will of businessman and philanthropist José Joaquín Vargas was made public. As the owner of the former lands of the El Salitre estate, he certified in a 1922 will that these properties belonged to a group of charitable institutions, with the hospital being the owner of the majority of the bequest. It was also clarified that the corresponding properties and the hospital itself are the property of Bogotá, not Cundinamarca, which, although it had an administrative role, was not the sole owner of the land. The San Juan de Dios Foundation (declared nonexistent in 2005 by a ruling of the Council of State) and the Cundinamarca Charity were not appointed as executors of said lands, therefore, political control investigations are underway at the Comptroller General of the Nation. The legacy corresponding to the El Salitre Estate comprises the lands from Avenida Ciudad de Quito (Carrera 30) to Avenida Boyacá and from Calle 68. up to 22nd Street, properties now sold off, mostly privately owned.

At the time, it faced a labor and social conflict, as its facilities were occupied by former employees who, since the 1999 crisis, had not received any payments or accrued labor rights. Furthermore, it was undergoing a liquidation process managed by the Cundinamarca Governorate, which was questioned by several entities.

In 2012, the liquidator, Ana Karenina Gauna Palencia, sold a plot of land belonging to the parking lot of the Maternal and Child Institute (IMI), which is an integral part of the San Juan de Dios Hospital, a declared cultural heritage site. The sale of equipment and furniture has also been questioned, as well as the discrepancies between the hospital's inventory before it was handed over to the liquidator and the inventory the liquidator held regarding the assets.

On September 30, 2013, following a public call for bids by the liquidator, the San Juan de Dios Hospital Complex and the Maternal and Child Institute were put up for sale to the highest bidder. Bidders had until October 30, 2013, to submit their best offer. It could only be sold to public entities, and its price could vary depending on the appraisal, which was yet to be determined. The liquidator was suspended from her duties in October 2013 due to constant delays in resolving the payment of outstanding labor claims and was replaced by Pablo Leal, although this change extended the call for bids for the sale of the hospital.

=== Recovery ===
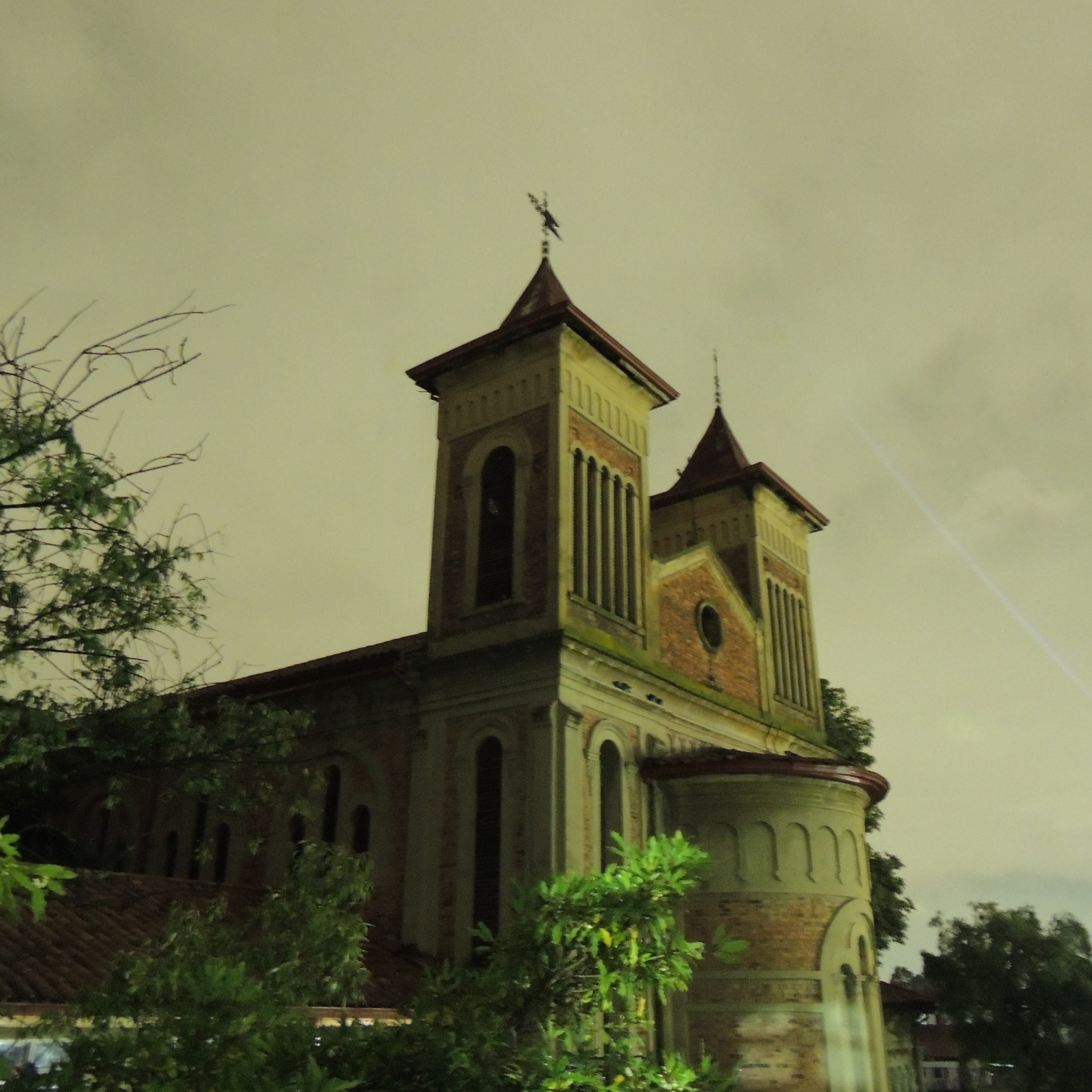
Chapel of the San Juan de Dios Hospital, Bogotá, Colombia, November 2022.

The hospital was finally awarded to the District of Bogotá, through the Urban Renewal Company, on November 28, 2014. Work began in February 2015 on its restoration and reopening, which they propose will proceed in accordance with the plan stipulated by former Mayor Petro: reopening in stages, beginning with the Maternal and Child Institute, which has been leased since 2006, and gradually with the other buildings, some of which are in serious disrepair. Retired hospital employees will be compensated for their respective shares. For the recovery, the Faculties of Arts, Economics, and Medicine of the National University of Colombia were tasked with developing the Special Management and Protection Plan, aimed at analyzing the future direction of the institution. This plan is directed by Claudia Romero Isaza. Among other things, the tenth avenue that runs through the complex must be lowered, green areas opened to improve patient access, all the properties must be renovated, and a first aid process must be carried out on nine of them, including the San Eduardo building, the Santiago Samper building, the rectory, the chapel, the main building, and the kindergarten; likewise, three of the structures must be reinforced: the central tower, the mental health institute, and the MRI room. The ultimate goal is to create a university hospital in compliance with Law 735 of 2002, and for this reason, the rector of the National University, Ignacio Mantilla, has expressed the institution's support for the district in achieving the phased reopening of the medical institution.

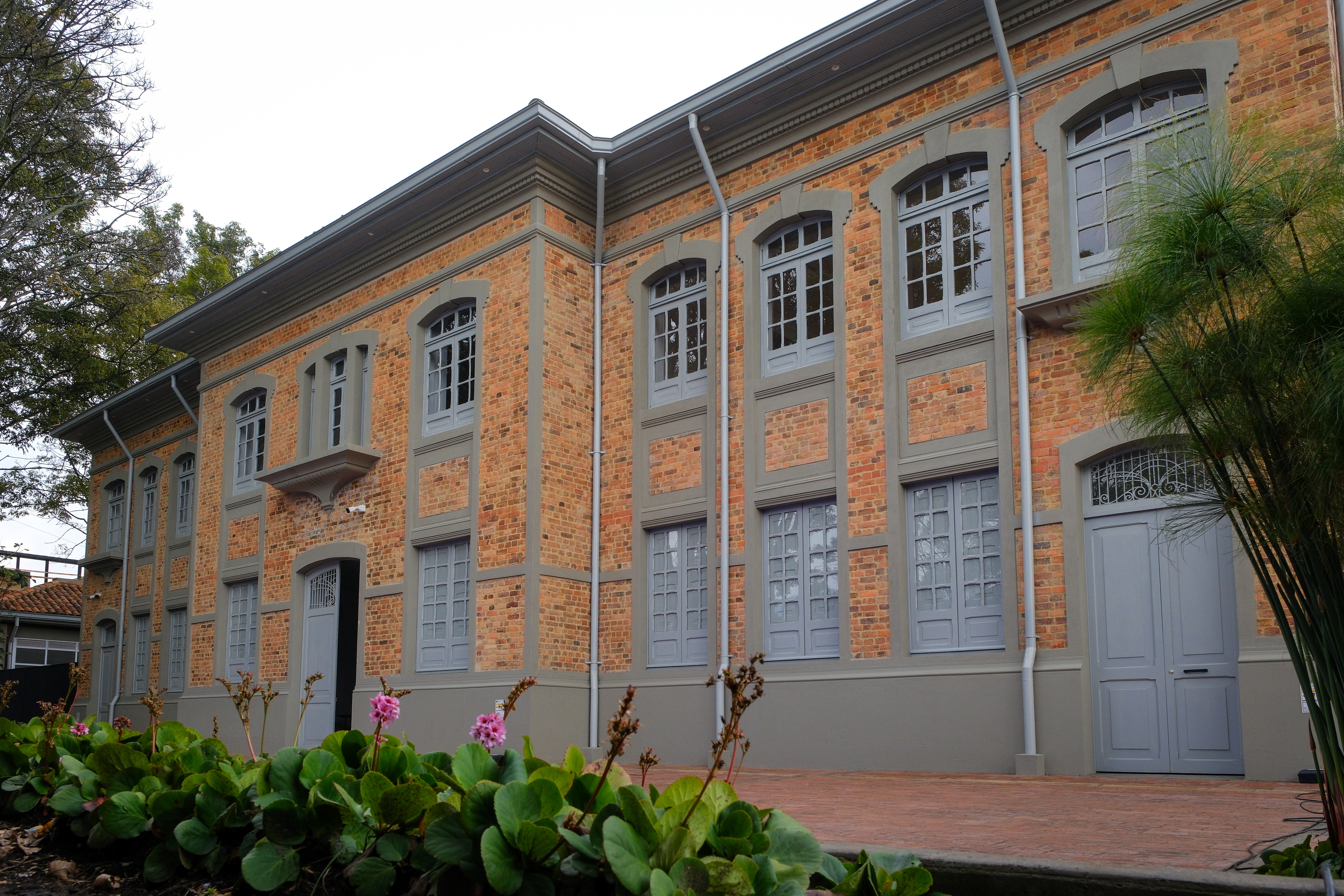
Building in 2026.

In January 2026, President Gustavo Petro confirmed that, in partnership with the city, he had allocated 1.6 trillion pesos to advance the recovery of the hospital complex after two decades of being out of operation. It was announced that the first patient is expected to be treated in May of the same year.

== Location and access ==
The San Juan de Dios Hospital can be accessed via the TransMilenio at the San Bernardo, Hortúa and Hospital stations.
