= Aaron Elkins =

American mystery writer

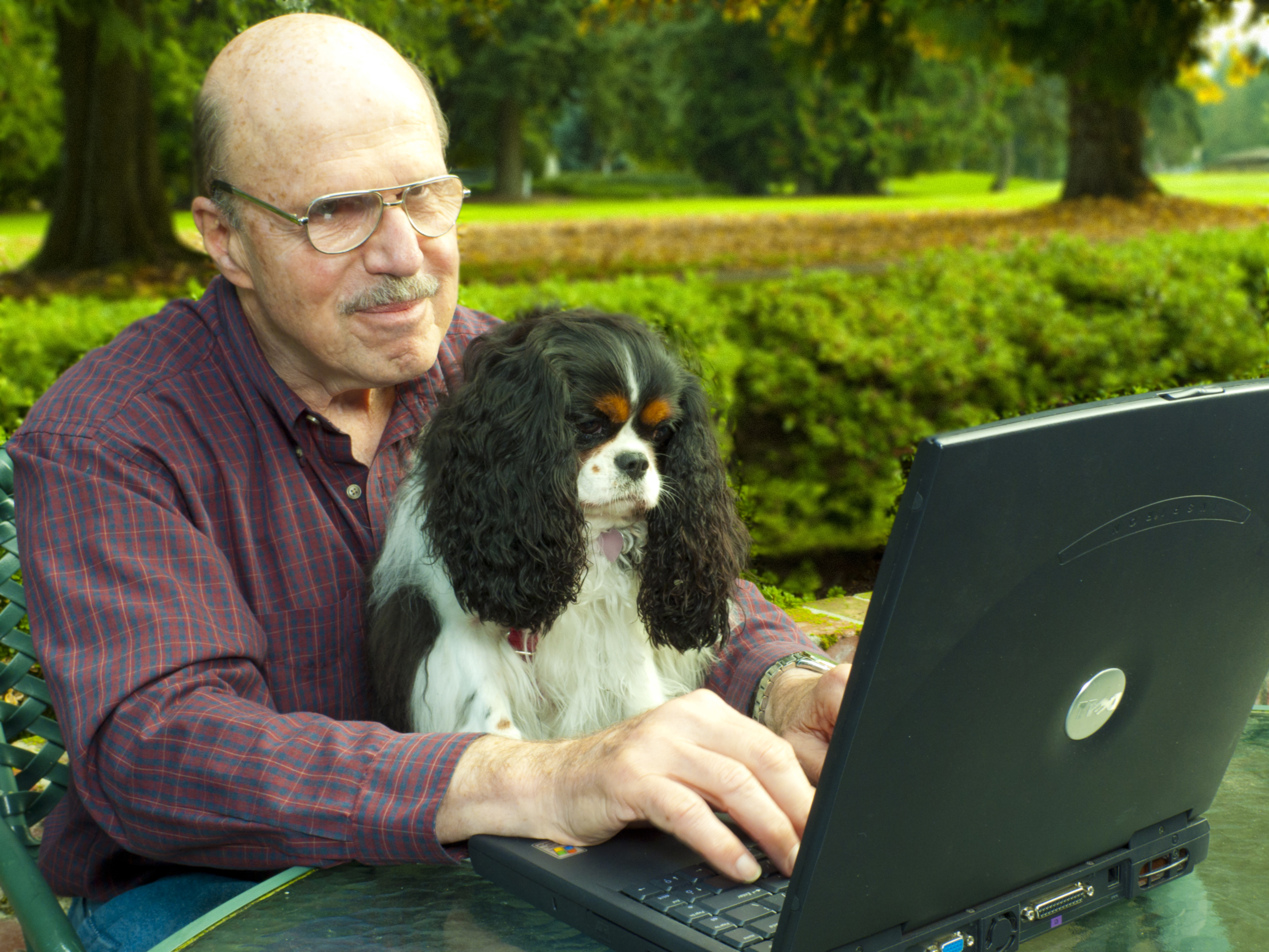
- Aaron Elkins
- Born: July 24, 1935 (age 91); Brooklyn, New York
- Occupation: Author
- Spouse: Charlotte Elkins
- Writing career
- Language: English
- Genre: Mystery
- Website: www.aaronelkins.com

Aaron Elkins (born July 24, 1935, in Brooklyn) is an American mystery writer. He is best known for his series of novels featuring forensic anthropologist Gideon Oliver—the 'skeleton detective'.

== Biography ==
Elkins's father was a machinist, his mother a homemaker. Elkins graduated from Hunter College in 1956 with a Bachelor of Arts, after which he studied at the University of Wisconsin–Madison, earned Master of Arts degrees at the University of Arizona (1960) and California State University, Los Angeles (1962), and received a doctorate in education (Ed.D.) in 1976 from the University of California, Berkeley.

Elkins had a multi-year career as a government employee, consultant, lecturer, and teacher in the fields of business, psychology, and anthropology.

Elkins and his wife, Charlotte Elkins, live in Sequim, Washington; they have two children.

== Writing ==
Elkins began his first novel (the first in the Gideon Oliver series) in 1978, at the age of 42. The fourth Oliver book, Old Bones, received the 1988 Edgar Award for "Best Mystery Novel" and was nominated for the 1988 Anthony Award in the same category.

The seventh Gideon Oliver novel, Make No Bones, was nominated for an Agatha Award in 1991.

In another series, the protagonist is museum curator Chris Norgren, an expert in Northern Renaissance art. His third novel in the Chris Norgren series, Old Scores, won a Nero Award for best mystery novel (1994), and was also nominated for an Agatha Award for "Best Novel".

One of his stand-alone thrillers, Loot, deals with art stolen by the Nazis and introduces protagonist Dr. Benjamin Revere.

With his wife, he has also co-written a series of golf mysteries about LPGA member Lee Ofsted. They shared an Agatha Award (1992) for their short story "Nice Gorilla".

== Works ==
=== Gideon Oliver novels ===
1. Fellowship of Fear (1982)
2. The Dark Place (1983)
3. Murder in the Queen's Armes (1985)
4. Old Bones (1987)
5. Curses! (1989)
6. Icy Clutches (1990)
7. Make No Bones (1991)
8. Dead Men's Hearts (1994)
9. Twenty Blue Devils (1997)
10. Skeleton Dance (2000)
11. Good Blood (2004)
12. Where There's a Will (2005)
13. Unnatural Selection (2006)
14. Little Tiny Teeth (2007)
15. Uneasy Relations (2008)
16. Skull Duggery (2009)
17. Dying on the Vine (2012)
18. Switcheroo (2016)

=== Chris Norgren novels ===
1. A Deceptive Clarity (1987)
2. A Glancing Light (1991)
3. Old Scores (1993)

=== Lee Ofsted novels (with Charlotte Elkins) ===
1. A Wicked Slice (1989)
2. Rotten Lies (1995)
3. Nasty Breaks (1997)
4. Where Have all the Birdies Gone? (2004)
5. On the Fringe (2005)

=== Alix London novels (with Charlotte Elkins) ===
1. A Dangerous Talent (2012) (German version: Gefährliches Talent, Translator: Olaf Knechten, 2013)
2. A Cruise to Die For (2013)
3. The Art Whisperer (2014)
4. The Trouble with Mirrors (2016)

=== Other novels ===
- Loot (1999)
- Turncoat (2002)
- The Worst Thing (2011)
- A Long Time Coming (2018)

== Adaptations ==
The character of Gideon Oliver appeared in an eponymous TV series starring Louis Gossett Jr. that ran on the ABC television network between February 1989 and May 1989 as part of the ABC Mystery Movie rotation.
