= Elkin Municipal Airport =

- IATA: none; ICAO: KZEF; FAA LID: ZEF

Summary
- Airport type: Public
- Owner: Town of Elkin
- Serves: Elkin, North Carolina
- Elevation AMSL: 1,067 ft (325 m)
- Coordinates: 36°16′48″N 080°47′10″W

Map
- Location of airport in North Carolina

Runways
Direction	Length		Surface
Direction	ft	m	Surface
7/25	4,001	1,220	Asphalt

Statistics (2009)
- Aircraft operations: 13,350
- Based aircraft: 17
- Source: Federal Aviation Administration

Elkin Municipal Airport (ICAO: KZEF, FAA LID: ZEF) is a public airport in Surry County, North Carolina, United States, three miles northeast of Elkin. It is owned by the Town of Elkin; the National Plan of Integrated Airport Systems for 2011–2015 called it a general aviation facility.

Most U.S. airports use the same three-letter location identifier for the FAA and IATA, but Elkin is assigned ZEF by the FAA and has no IATA identifier. The airport's ICAO identifier is KZEF.

== Facilities and aircraft ==
Elkin Municipal Airport covers 91 acres (37 ha) at an elevation of 1,067 feet (325 m) above mean sea level. Its one runway, 7/25, is 4,001 by 75 feet (1,220 x 23 m) asphalt.

In the year ending July 24, 2009 the airport had 13,350 aircraft operations, average 36 per day: 97% general aviation and 3% military. 17 aircraft were then based at this airport: 88% single-engine and 12% multi-engine.

== See also ==
- List of airports in North Carolina
