= Monroe Township, Union County, North Carolina =

Coordinates: 34.99907°N 80.53401°W

- Township
- Location of Monroe Township in Union County

- Location of Union County in North Carolina
- Country: United States
- State: North Carolina
- County: Union

Area
  - Total: 100.44 sq mi (260.13 km^{2})
- Highest elevation (south central part of township): 706 ft (215 m)
- Lowest elevation (quarry pit in central part of township): 388 ft (118 m)

Population (2010)
  - Total: 52,310
  - Density: 520.81/sq mi (201.09/km^{2})
- Time zone: UTC-4 (EST)
  - Summer (DST): UTC-5 (EDT)
- Area code: 704

Monroe Township, population 52,310, is one of nine townships in Union County, North Carolina. Monroe Township is 100.44 square miles (260.1 km^{2}) in size and is located in central Union County. This township contains the towns of Wingate (west parts of), Unionville, Mineral Springs, Wesley Chapel, Indian Trail, and the City of Monroe within its borders.

== Geography ==
Most of the township is drained by Richardson Creek and its tributaries; Mill Creek, Meadow Branch, Stewarts Creek, Rays Fork, Bearskin Creek, Beaverdam Creek, and Little Richardson Creek. The very western part of the township is drained by Twelvemile Creek and its tributaries.
