= New Salem Township, Union County, North Carolina =

Coordinates: 35.10929°N 80.35683°W

- Township
- Location of New Salem Township in Union County

- Location of Union County in North Carolina
- Country: United States
- State: North Carolina
- County: Union

Area
  - Total: 67.92 sq mi (175.91 km^{2})
- Highest elevation (high point southwest end of township): 666 ft (203 m)
- Lowest elevation (Floodplain of Richardson Creek on east side of township): 278 ft (85 m)

Population (2010)
  - Total: 3,532
  - Density: 52/sq mi (20/km^{2})
- Time zone: UTC-4 (EST)
  - Summer (DST): UTC-5 (EDT)
- Area code: 704

New Salem Township, population 3,532, is one of nine townships in Union County, North Carolina. New Salem Township is 67.92 square miles (175.9 km^{2}) in size and is located in northeastern Union County. This township does not contain any cities or towns within its borders.

== Geography ==
The Rocky River forms the northern boundary of the township. The northern part of the township is drained by the Rocky River and its tributaries and include Crisco Branch, Grassy Creek, Clear Creek, and Reason Branch. The rest of the township is drained by Richardson Creek and its tributaries. These tributaries include Water Branch, Gourdvine Creek, Salem Creek, Gold Branch, and Watson Creek.
