= Enigma tornado outbreak =

1884 tornado outbreak in the southern and eastern United States

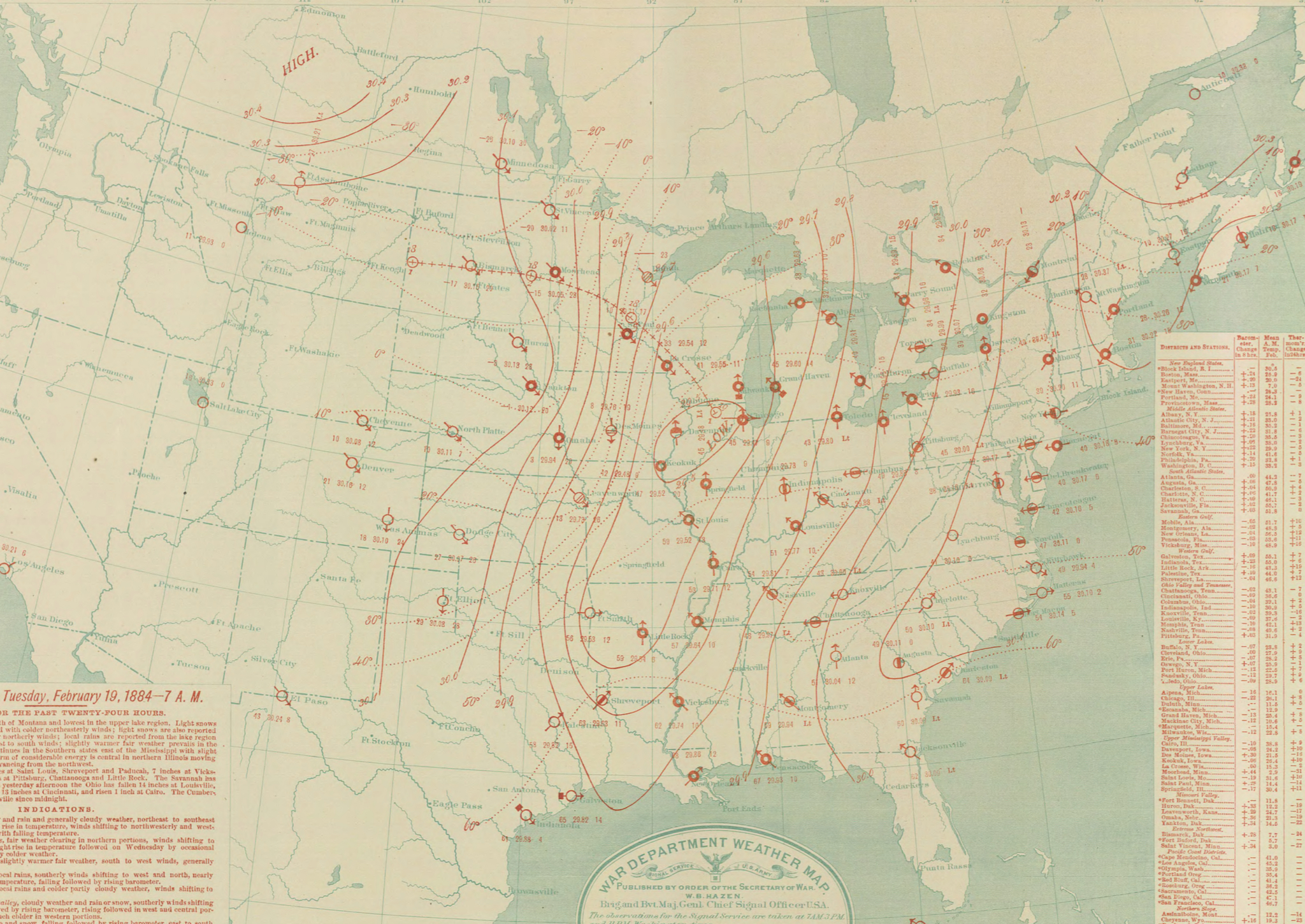
- Weather map of the storm system over the Midwestern United States that would be responsible for tornado outbreak on February 19.

Tornado outbreak
- Tornadoes: ~60±
- Max. rating: F4+ tornado
- Duration: February 19–20, 1884
- Largest hail: 5 in (13 cm)

Overall effects
- Fatalities: ≥ ~180 (unofficial estimates of 800–1,200)
- Injuries: ≥ 1,056
- Damage: $3–4 million ($107,500,000–143,330,000 in 2025 USD) (Note: All losses are in 1884 United States dollars unless otherwise noted.)
- Areas affected: Southeastern United States
- Part of the tornadoes and tornado outbreaks of 1884

On February 19–20, 1884, a large tornado outbreak occurred over the Southeastern United States, known as the Enigma tornado outbreak due to the uncertain number of total tornadoes and fatalities. Nonetheless, an inspection of newspaper reports and governmental studies published in the aftermath reveals successive, long-tracked tornado families striking Alabama, Georgia, Illinois, Indiana, Kentucky, Mississippi, North Carolina, South Carolina, Tennessee and Virginia, with an estimation of at least 51—and possibly 60 or more—tornadoes striking that Tuesday into Wednesday.

The majority of reported tornado activity was seen across Alabama, Georgia, South Carolina and North Carolina, which were all struck severely by multiple waves of tornado families. In the Southeast, the outbreak began during the late morning in Mississippi, preceded by severe thunderstorms in Louisiana. Shortly thereafter, the outbreak widened and intensified, progressing from Alabama to Virginia between noon and midnight. The outbreak also produced the deadliest individual tornado in North Carolina history, an F4 which swept through the Rockingham area, killing 23. (Note: An outbreak is generally defined as a group of at least six tornadoes (the number sometimes varies slightly according to local climatology) with no more than a six-hour gap between individual tornadoes. An outbreak sequence, prior to (after) the start of modern records in 1950, is defined as a period of no more than two (one) consecutive days without at least one significant (F2 or stronger) tornado.)

== Confirmed tornadoes ==
Confirmed tornadoes by Fujita rating
FU	F0	F1	F2	F3	F4	F5	Total
13	?	1	24	9	4	0	≥ 51*

The following events were also reported:

- A possible tornado may have occurred on February 19 south of Chester, South Carolina, killing one person.
- Another tornado may have destroyed five homes south of Branchville.

Prior to 1990, there is a likely undercount of tornadoes, particularly E/F0–1, with reports of weaker tornadoes becoming more common as population increased. A sharp increase in the annual average E/F0–1 count by approximately 200 tornadoes was noted upon the implementation of NEXRAD Doppler weather radar in 1990–1991. (Note: Historically, the number of tornadoes globally and in the United States was and is likely underrepresented: research by Grazulis on annual tornado activity suggests that, as of 2001, only 53% of yearly U.S. tornadoes were officially recorded. Documentation of tornadoes outside the United States was historically less exhaustive, owing to the lack of monitors in many nations and, in some cases, to internal political controls on public information. Most countries only recorded tornadoes that produced severe damage or loss of life. Significant low biases in U.S. tornado counts likely occurred through the early 1990s, when advanced NEXRAD was first installed and the National Weather Service began comprehensively verifying tornado occurrences.) 1974 marked the first year where significant tornado (E/F2+) counts became homogenous with contemporary values, attributed to the consistent implementation of Fujita scale assessments. (Note: The Fujita scale was devised under the aegis of scientist T. Theodore Fujita in the early 1970s. Prior to the advent of the scale in 1971, tornadoes in the United States were officially unrated. Tornado ratings were retroactively applied to events prior to the formal adoption of the F-scale by the National Weather Service. While the Fujita scale has been superseded by the Enhanced Fujita scale in the U.S. since February 1, 2007, Canada used the old scale until April 1, 2013; nations elsewhere, like the United Kingdom, apply other classifications such as the TORRO scale.) Numerous discrepancies on the details of tornadoes in this outbreak exist between sources. The total count of tornadoes and ratings differs from various agencies accordingly. The list below documents information from the most contemporary official sources alongside assessments from tornado historian Thomas P. Grazulis.

=== February 19 event ===
List of confirmed tornadoes – Tuesday, February 19, 1884
F#	Location	County / Parish	State	Time (UTC) (Note: All dates are based on the local time zone where the tornado touched down; however, all times are in Coordinated Universal Time and dates are split at midnight CST/CDT for consistency.)	Path length	Width (Note: The listed width values are primarily the average/mean width of the tornadoes, with those having known maximum widths denoted by ♯. From 1952 to 1994, reports largely list mean width whereas contemporary years list maximum width. Values provided by Grazulis are the average width, with estimates being rounded down (i.e. 0.5 mi (0.80 km) is rounded down from 880 yards to 800 yards.)
F2	Louisville	Winston	MS	17:00–?	Unknown	200 yd (180 m)
F2	A mill and a pair of small homes were destroyed.					
F2	NE of Crawford (MS) to NW of Carrollton (AL)	Lowndes (MS), Pickens (AL)	MS, AL	17:30–?	25 mi (40 km)	300 yd (270 m)
F2	1+ death – Sharecroppers' cabins were destroyed, and plantations near Columbus heavily damaged. Multiple people may have died in Mississippi. 20 injuries occurred.					
F1+	SW of Clarksville to ENE of Hampton Station	Montgomery	TN	17:45–?	Unknown	800 yd (730 m)
F1+	Many homes lost their roofs, and trees and fencing were felled. A large, domed warehouse lost its cupola and much of its roofing. Several other warehouses were unroofed, along with a number of businesses. Skylights and windows were shattered as well, a carriage house and carriage destroyed, chimneys knocked down, and a church twisted on its foundation. Half a dozen homes occupied by blacks were leveled, at least one of them a robust, frame structure. Three injuries were reported.					
F2	Cumming	Forsyth	GA	18:20–?	10 mi (16 km)	100 yd (91 m)
F2	1 death – 20 or more homes were destroyed or damaged. Entire swaths were reportedly leveled. 40 injuries occurred.					
F2	E of Columbus to Geneva	Muscogee, Talbot	GA	18:30–?	25 mi (40 km)	100 yd (91 m)
F2	This was probably a family of two tornadoes. Heavy damage occurred in the Columbus area, to mostly industrial property, totaling $85,000. Five injuries occurred. 5-inch-diameter (13 cm) hailstones were reported in Harris County, just north of Columbus.					
F2	N of Tallapoosa	Haralson	GA	18:30–?	Unknown	Unknown
F2	Many homes were destroyed. Several fatalities may have occurred. Two people were injured.					
F2	S of Rockford to E of Goodwater	Coosa	AL	18:30–?	20 mi (32 km)	Unknown
F2	Schools and homes were wrecked. 15 injuries occurred, a number of which were by students. Fires erupted in Goodwater after the passing of the storm, damaging several homes.					
F4+	S of Cartersville to Mount Oglethorpe	Bartow, Cherokee, Pickens, Dawson	GA	19:00–?	40 mi (64 km)	1,500 yd (1,400 m)
F4+	22 deaths – See section on this tornado – 50+ people were injured.					
F4	Oxmoor to SE of Branchville	Jefferson, St. Clair	AL	19:20–?	30 mi (48 km)	400 yd (370 m)
F4	13+ deaths – This extremely intense tornado, which formed just south of Birmingham, crossed the Cahaba Valley near Shades Mountain, injuring 15 people and wrecking nine homes at Brock Gap. At Leeds the tornado damaged a newly built industrial area, where 27 homes, mostly constructed of brick, were destroyed, many of which were well built and obliterated, some along with their foundations. All known fatalities occurred in the Leeds area, but additional deaths may have occurred elsewhere, and the total number of dead may have exceeded 18. 30 people were injured along the path.					
F2	N of Lincoln	Talladega, Calhoun	AL	19:45–?	5 mi (8.0 km)	200 yd (180 m)
F2	Several homes were destroyed. 15 people were injured.					
F2	N of Watkinsville to Sandy Cross	Oconee, Clarke, Oglethorpe	GA	20:00–?	20 mi (32 km)	Unknown
F2	This strong tornado damaged several small homes, injuring five people. A well-built barn was shattered and timberland flattened.					
F4	N of Jacksonville (AL) to N of Cave Spring (GA)	Calhoun (AL), Cherokee (AL), Floyd (GA)	AL, GA	20:30–?	35 mi (56 km)	400 yd (370 m)
F4	30+ deaths – This violent, long-lived tornado ravaged six or more rural communities in Alabama, causing 26 deaths, 10 of which occurred just north of Piedmont. 14 deaths were reported at Goshen, where a schoolmaster died and 25 pupils were injured; half a dozen of the latter may have died later. Frail housing "literally vanished," and cotton bales were moved 1/2 mi (0.80 km). In Georgia the tornado obliterated many large homes, killing four more people. In all, 100 people were injured. Another F4 tornado, closely following the path of this one, hit the Piedmont–Goshen area and killed 20 people in a single church on March 27, 1994. The Goshan community was hit by another EF-4 tornado on April 27,2011.					
F2	Indian Springs to Smithboro	Butts, Jasper, Putnam, Greene	GA	20:30–?	30 mi (48 km)	300 yd (270 m)
F2	2+ deaths – This strong, long-tracked tornado wrecked several dozen tenant homes. Several people were severely injured. A third death may have been tornado-related but was not definitively attributable. The path was up to 1/2 mi (0.80 km) wide at times and passed north of Monticello. 30 people were injured.					
F3	E of Doraville to Hix	Gwinnett, Barrow, Jackson, Madison	GA	20:30–?	50 mi (80 km)	500 yd (460 m)
F3	2 deaths – This was probably an intense tornado family, individual members of which left 1/2-mile-wide (0.80 km) swaths of destruction. Damage may have begun in DeKalb County, where structures were felled. Farmhouses—some of which were reportedly "leveled"—and miles of forest were destroyed. The deaths occurred in a boarding house. 35 people were injured.					
F2	Franklin to Palmetto	Heard, Coweta, Fulton	GA	20:30–?	≥ 20 mi (32 km)	400 yd (370 m)
F2	1+ death – Damage occurred northwest of Newnan and in Palmetto. At least three strong tornadoes, occurring in quick succession, affected the same area, each of which was likely of at least F2 status. At least five fatalities may have occurred. 30 injuries were reported.					
F3	NW of Lula to S of Toccoa	Hall, Banks, Habersham, Stephens	GA	20:30–?	25 mi (40 km)	300 yd (270 m)
F3	2+ deaths – This intense tornado passed south of Mount Airy, sweeping away a home in Banks County. A third death was unconfirmed. The tornado wrecked 14 or more homes, along with many miles of timberland. 20 people were injured.					
F3	Hillsboro to SE of Eatonton	Jasper, Putnam, Hancock	GA	21:00–?	30 mi (48 km)	400 yd (370 m)
F3	8+ deaths – This intense tornado destroyed a plantation, killing seven or more tenants and a woman. Many small homes were leveled on the plantation. 10 or more additional deaths may have taken place among sharecroppers elsewhere, but were never verified. 50 injuries were confirmed. In 1984 Grazulis listed this tornado as an F4, but downgraded it to F3 in his later work.					
F3	Maynard to Blountsville to NW of Milledgeville	Monroe, Jones, Baldwin	GA	21:15–?	30 mi (48 km)	200 yd (180 m)
F3	12 deaths – Large homes were swept away in Jones County, along with many smaller homes. Eyewitnesses north of Macon described a multiple-vortex storm, preceded by 3-inch-diameter (7.6 cm) hail. 50 injuries occurred. In 1984 Grazulis listed this tornado as an F4, but downgraded it to F3 in his later work.					
FU	Marietta	Pickens, Greenville	SC	21:30–?	Unknown	Unknown
FU	A church and many small homes destroyed in the Marietta area, at the foot of the Blue Ridge Mountains in northwestern Greenville County. Damage from downbursts or a series of small tornadoes continued into Rutherford County, North Carolina.					
FU	Brevard to S of Marion	Transylvania, Henderson, Buncombe, McDowell	NC	21:30–?	Unknown	Unknown
FU	This complex series of small, short-lived tornadoes and/or violent downbursts originated in the upper French Broad valley, before descending the Blue Ridge.					
F2	N of Woodruff to Pacolet	Spartanburg, Cherokee	SC	21:30–?	Unknown	Unknown
F2	Many barns and small homes were wrecked, and a larger home was unroofed. Six people were injured. The tornado passed near Glenn Springs.					
F2	S of Highgrove to E of Fairfield	Nelson, Spencer	KY	21:30–?	9 mi (14 km)	200 yd (180 m)
F2	1 death – Six or more homes were destroyed and 30 people injured in the Highgrove area. The sole fatality occurred in a barn.					
F3	N of Sparta to N of Thomson	Hancock, Warren, McDuffie, Columbia	GA	22:00–?	45 mi (72 km)	200 yd (180 m)
F3	2+ deaths – This tornado family formed from the same storm as the Hillsboro F3. Farms and small homes were destroyed at multiple locations. A train derailed northwest of Augusta. Substantial hail accumulations were reported in Warren County. At least two additional deaths may have occurred. 15 people were injured. In 1984 Grazulis listed this tornado as an F4, but downgraded it to F3 in his later work.					
F3	S of Anderson	Anderson, Greenville	SC	22:30–?	10 mi (16 km)	400 yd (370 m)
F3	2+ deaths – This multiple-vortex tornado or family passed through a mill/village complex, destroying at least 12 small homes, along with several larger homes and a tenant home. One or more additional deaths may have occurred. 20 people were injured.					
F2	S of Washington to S of Lincolnton	Wilkes, Lincoln	GA	22:30–?	20 mi (32 km)	600 yd (550 m)
F2	7+ deaths – Deaths, mainly those of children, occurred on a pair of plantations. Some reports indicated as many as 20 fatalities. 40 people were injured.					
FU	Chester	Chester	SC	23:00–?	Unknown	Unknown
FU	Severe damage occurred in downtown Chester, with 40 homes damaged or destroyed elsewhere in town. Losses totaled $50,000.					
F2	S of Thomson to Harlem	McDuffie, Columbia	GA	23:00–?	10 mi (16 km)	Unknown
F2	This tornado hit five plantations, destroying many cotton gins, mills, tenant homes, and small homes. Seven injuries occurred.					
F3	S of Tennille to Davisboro	Washington, Jefferson	GA	23:00–?	35 mi (56 km)	500 yd (460 m)
F3	4 deaths – This intense tornado family occurred within a wider complex of downbursts, which combined to create a broad damage swath. The business district of Davisboro was devastated, with every business in downtown destroyed; losses there totaled 30 stores and homes. Debris was carried for 52 mi (84 km). 30 people were injured and losses totaled at least $100,000.					
F2	S of Shelton to Woodward to S of Lancaster	Fairfield, Chester, Lancaster	SC	23:15–?	35 mi (56 km)	200 yd (180 m)
F2	3 deaths – A damage swath peaked at 1 1/2 mi (2.4 km) wide; eyewitness accounts from Lancaster (the storm passed immediately south of town) would suggest that this was a tornado/downburst complex and likely a family of multiple tornadoes. Its attendant supercell later produced the Polkton F3 in North Carolina, and small tornadoes or downbursts linked the paths of these larger storms. 10 people were injured.					
F2	Phoenix to Silverstreet	Greenwood, Newberry	SC	23:30–?	35 mi (56 km)	400 yd (370 m)
F2	5 deaths – 12 plantations were heavily damaged; a large home was destroyed near Ninety Six, and most buildings in Chappells were damaged or destroyed. Eight train cars were thrown. 30 people were injured.					
F2	N of Newberry to N of Winnsboro	Newberry, Fairfield	SC	23:45–?	25 mi (40 km)	400 yd (370 m)
F2	2 deaths – Several hundred acres of timber were destroyed in eastern Newberry and western Fairfield counties, particularly near the Broad River. Deaths were in tenant homes in the White Oak area. 15 injuries occurred.					
F2	S of Wrightsville to Herndon	Johnson, Emanuel, Jenkins	GA	00:00–?	35 mi (56 km)	Unknown
F2	1 death – This was a probable tornado family. Four people were injured.					
F2	N of Waynesboro (GA) to Jackson (SC)	Burke (GA), Richmond (GA), Aiken (SC)	GA, SC	00:00–?	20 mi (32 km)	200 yd (180 m)
F2	5 deaths – This storm passed south of Augusta, beginning at the McBean railroad depot; most damage occurred near Ellenton, South Carolina, where numerous structures and farms were impacted. The depot at Jackson was leveled, and many other structures were damaged or destroyed in and near town, including tenant homes. 30 people were injured.					
FU	Olin	Iredell	NC	00:30–?	7 mi (11 km)	Unknown
FU	Damage occurred to a church and to farm buildings.					
F3	SE of Monroe to S of Troy	Union, Anson, Richmond, Montgomery	NC	01:00–?	35 mi (56 km)	400 yd (370 m)
F3	4 deaths – See section on this tornado – 50 people were injured.					
F2	Pioneer Mills to W of Troy	Cabarrus, Stanly, Montgomery	NC	02:00–?	25 mi (40 km)	Unknown
F2	1+ death – See section on this tornado – 25 people were injured.					
F4	Morven to Johnsonville	Anson, Richmond, Moore, Harnett	NC	02:30–?	50 mi (80 km)	500 yd (460 m)
F4	23+ deaths – See section on this tornado – 100 people were injured.					
FU	Laurinburg	Scotland	NC	03:00–?	Unknown	Unknown
FU	"Severe damage" was reported.					
F2	Cary	Wake	NC	03:00–?	6 mi (9.7 km)	Unknown
F2	1 death – This storm was preceded by very large hail, and was illuminated by continual lightning and unusual optical phenomena. Several small homes were destroyed in Cary. Five people were injured.					
F2	Lillington to W of Smithfield	Harnett, Johnston	NC	04:00–?	10 mi (16 km)	400 yd (370 m)
F2	2+ deaths – A 1/2-mile-wide (0.80 km) swath of damage was reported. Five or more small farmhouses were destroyed in Johnston County, including tenant homes. Four additional fatalities may have occurred. 20 injuries occurred.					
FU	SE of Zebulon to NE of Rocky Mount	Johnston, Nash, Edgecombe	NC	04:30–?	Unknown	Unknown
FU	Two churches and several homes in Rocky Mount were damaged.					
F3	Darlington	Darlington	SC	04:30–?	5 mi (8.0 km)	150 yd (140 m)
F3	6+ deaths – This intense tornado passed very close to downtown Darlington, destroying at least 30 homes, one of whose debris was carried for miles, and unroofing a railroad depot. Five-sixths of the homes were small. Downburst damage continued to Robeson County, North Carolina. Four more people may have died of injuries. 50 people were injured.					
FU	Marion	Perry	AL	Unknown	Unknown	Unknown
FU	1 death – Damage was reported in Marion.					
FU	Guntersville	Cullman, Marshall	AL	Unknown	Unknown	Unknown
FU	Details are unavailable.					
FU	Caseyville	St. Clair	IL	Unknown	Unknown	Unknown
FU	Details are unavailable.					
FU	Metropolis	Massac	IL	Unknown	Unknown	Unknown
FU	Many homes were destroyed, along with a church.					
FU	Paducah	McCracken	KY	Unknown	Unknown	Unknown
FU	A tobacco warehouse and other large buildings were damaged or destroyed.					
FU	Franklin	Simpson	KY	Unknown	Unknown	Unknown
FU	A factory was destroyed.					

=== February 20 event ===
List of confirmed tornadoes – Wednesday, February 20, 1884
F#	Location	County / Parish	State	Time (UTC)	Path length	Width
FU	W of Petersburg	Dinwiddie, Chesterfield	VA	06:00–?	Unknown	Unknown
FU	A tornado/downburst complex of unknown magnitude passed near Petersburg, where downburst damage was noted throughout the city.					
F2	S of Branchville	Orangeburg	SC	06:00–?	Unknown	Unknown
F2	Five homes were destroyed. A dozen people were injured.					
F2	S of Foreston	Clarendon, Williamsburg	SC	07:00–?	10 mi (16 km)	600 yd (550 m)
F2	4 deaths – Most of the severest damage was south of Foreston. Six homes were wrecked. 10 people were injured.					

=== Waleska–Cagle–Tate, Georgia ===
Waleska–Cagle–Tate, Georgia
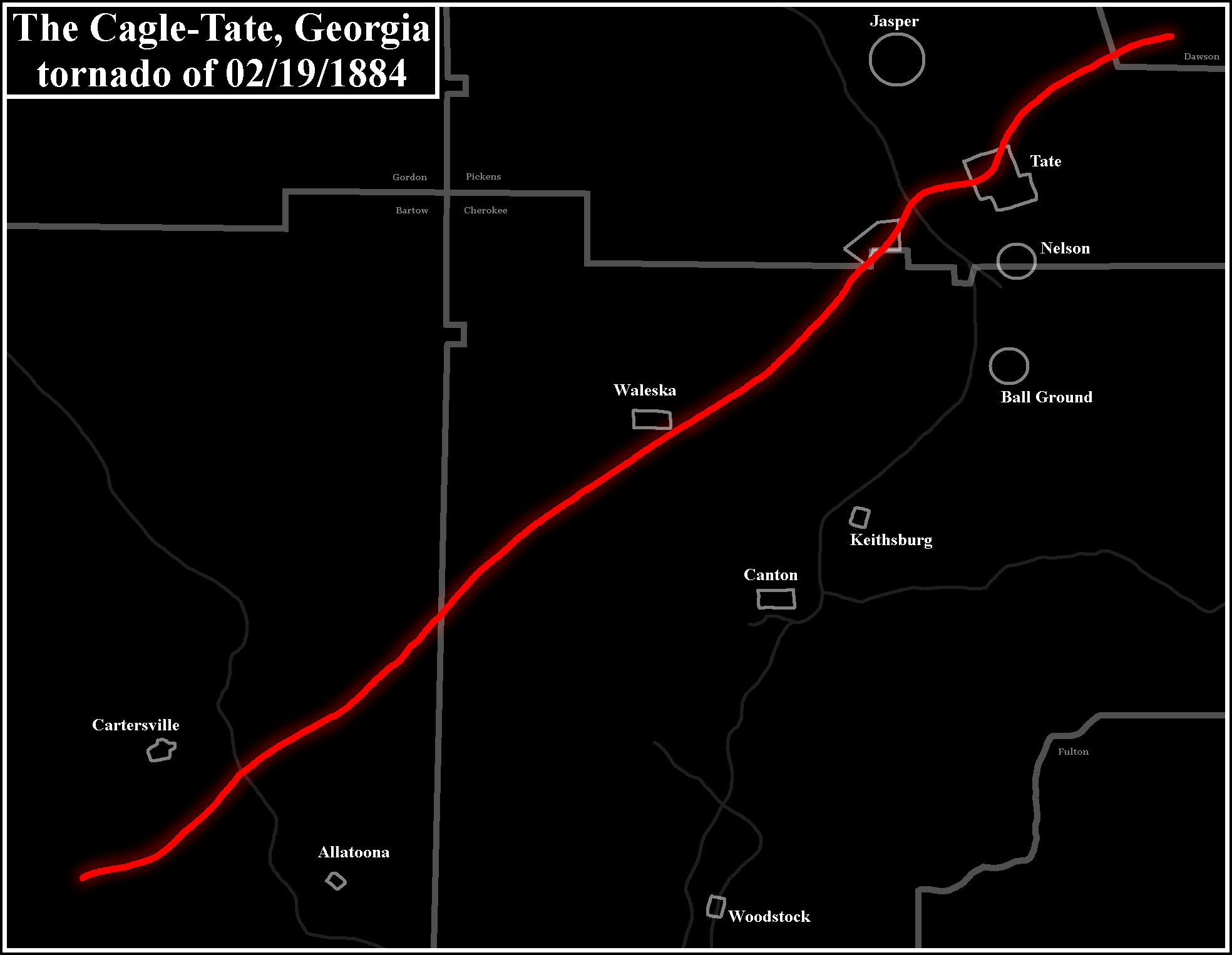
- The approximate path of the tornado.

F4+ tornado

Overall effects
- Fatalities: 22
- Injuries: 50+
- Damage: $100,000 USD 1884 ($3.42 million in 2026)

This violent tornado touched down in Bartow County, Georgia around 4 miles southwest of Cartersville. The tornado initially produced minor damage to ten farms, however the tornado then strengthened as it impacted a schoolhouse, completely destroying it. The tornado then crossed the Etowah River, and immediately damaged or destroyed multiple barns, farm homes, and a gin house around Spencer Plantation, as well as kill or injure multiple farm animals.

The tornado then crossed into rural Cherokee County where it strengthened even further, becoming violent as it approached homes southeast of Waleska. Schools in the area had let students out early due to the approaching storms. Then as the tornado tracked through the area, multiple homes were either leveled or swept away, leading to the deaths of three children who were sheltering in an old home.

The tornado then continued to further intensify as it crossed into Pickens County, where it then struck the community of Cagle. Multiple homes, including a large and well-built two-story home owned by the Cagle Brothers, took a direct hit from the violent tornado. The tornado "literally tore the happy home into a million pieces" as it struck the Cagle Brother's residence, filling the air with debris from the home and the many other buildings on the property. Levi Cagle, who was at his brother's residence at the time, rushed back to a "heart-rendering spectacle". Six people who were at the Cagle Brother's residence were killed instantly, his wife, two children, and three hired men, with one of the hired men being crushed by a huge tree. Three other children were found in "near-dying condition". The community of Cagle was left completely destroyed, with the only evidence of homes being there were scattered pieces of buildings and broken furniture.

"In many places the face of the country has not a vestige of timber left standing and where two days ago were dense forest now barren hilltops alone are left. Up the mountainside the rent and torn trees make white dots that are easily distinguished"

The tornado then continued through Pickens County, claiming more lives as it destroyed homes and businesses along its path. The newly constructed Refugee Baptist Church was "blown to atoms", and nearby homes were "blown from over them and dashed into a million splinters".

The tornado then directly struck the town of Tate at violent intensity, resulting in catastrophic damage, with the storm "wiping the place from the face of the earth". The Cool Springs Baptist Church, as well as countless other homes and businesses were wiped out by the tornado, leaving only one or two homes within Tate left standing. After the tornado left Tate, it continued through rural areas of Pickens County, striking homes, and causing the Long Swamp Church to be blown a half mile and "torn into kindling". The tornado then crossed into Dawson County, where up to 6 more homes would be destroyed, before the tornado dissipated on Mt Oglethorpe.

In total, 22 lives were claimed by the tornado, most within Pickens County. In a publication by meteorologist Thomas P. Grazulis in 1984, Grazulis indicated that the damage within Cagle may have been F5, however he questioned the construction quality of the homes. 110 years later in 1994, another F4 tornado struck some of the same areas impacted by this tornado.

=== Polkton–Ansonville–Mangum–Pekin, North Carolina ===
Polkton–Ansonville–Mangum–Pekin, North Carolina
F3 tornado
- on the Fujita scale

Overall effects
- Fatalities: 4
- Injuries: 50

This was the first of a number of destructive North Carolina storms. Detailed coverage in a Wadesboro-based newspaper provides an unusually (by 19th-century standards) precise survey of the movement and damage produced by three of those storms in the southern Piedmont of North Carolina. This storm first formed in southeastern Union County, from a supercell that had produced significant damage in South Carolina earlier. Most of the path of this storm was in rural areas, with injuries and major damage along Beaverdam Creek, south of Marshville in Union County, and along Brown Creek in Anson County, northeast of Polkton.

Significant damage also occurred in and around the towns of Polkton and Ansonville, where structures in both towns were widely damaged, with homes and farm buildings destroyed south of Ansonville. A total of four people were killed: a pair in a "'mansion'" that was destroyed, and another pair in one of 28 homes that were wrecked on a plantation. Eyewitnesses in Polkton noted that the storm "crossed the railroad about a mile east of Polkton last night prostrating everything in its course. Could see the storm from Polkton by lightning, looked like a cloud of dense smoke and sounded like thunder. Hail stones measuring 2 1/2 in (6.4 cm) long, 1 1/2 in (3.8 cm) wide and 1 in (2.5 cm) thick fell."

Homes were also destroyed near Mangum in Richmond County and near Pekin in Montgomery County.

=== Pioneer Mills, North Carolina ===
Pioneer Mills, North Carolina
F2 tornado
- on the Fujita scale

Overall effects
- Fatalities: ≥ 1
- Injuries: 25

This storm was preceded and followed by a wide area of downburst damage – with scattered areas of damage to farms and small structures reported across a wide area of southern Cabarrus County, eastern Mecklenburg County (northeast of Mint Hill) and the Goose Creek area of northwestern Union County.

The first tornado-specific damage occurred in the Pioneer Mills community between Harrisburg and Midland in Cabarrus County, where a mill was destroyed and estimated F2 damage was inflicted upon several residences, including several small and a few larger homes that were wrecked. The storm passed within 2 mi (3.2 km) of Albemarle; little damage was recorded elsewhere in Stanly County. Several poorly constructed buildings were destroyed along the Uwharrie River in Montgomery County, and damage to farms was widespread in the county. One person was killed, but there may have been other deaths. Downburst damage continued to southwest of Asheboro.

=== Rockingham–Manly, North Carolina ===
Rockingham–Manly, North Carolina
F4 tornado
- on the Fujita scale

Overall effects
- Fatalities: ≥ 23
- Injuries: 100

Spawned late in the outbreak, the storm which swept from Anson to Harnett Counties in North Carolina passed through the Rockingham area, and became the deadliest tornado in recorded North Carolina history. This storm first touched down east of the town of McFarlan, in southeastern Anson County. The storm produced little damage in Anson County, but caused two deaths south of Pee Dee.

Tracking to the northeast, it crossed the Pee Dee River into Richmond County and produced sporadic damage until just southeast of Rockingham. Extreme damage to pine forests was first noted just south of town. Strengthening considerably, the storm swept through the southeast edge of Rockingham, where large homes were destroyed to their foundations, and large hardwood trees were snapped at ground level. The Philadelphia Church community (presently on U.S. Highway 1, 3 mi (4.8 km) northeast of downtown Rockingham) was devastated, with most of the poorly constructed dwellings in the community completely destroyed. 15 or more deaths occurred there. The storm had widened to nearly 1 mi (1.6 km) in width at this point.

Forests and rural homes were flattened in and beyond Philadelphia. The storm then tracked through what is now the town of Hoffman, before entering Moore County. Severe damage was again seen in the communities of Keyser and Manly (presently at the northeast corner of the city of Southern Pines), along the southeast edge of Moore County. The storm then curved slightly to the east, dissipating into a wide area of downburst damage near the community of Johnsonville. A total of at least 23 people were killed, for many of the injured may have died later. Eyewitnesses reported large hail and intense lightning displays preceding the storm.

An unusually detailed accounting of the storm's passage through Richmond County was provided two days later: a local resident undertook an informal, but detailed survey of the damage produced by the storm, and this account was published in an Anson County newspaper. This accounting establishes a steady southwest-to-northeast movement through the county, with a number of buildings—sharecropper cabins, large homes, and a mill—swept away along the path. As the storm passed 1 mi (1.6 km) southeast of downtown Rockingham, it may have peaked in intensity; it was noted that all structures along a 5-mile-long (8.0 km) segment of the path (beginning at this point) were destroyed. The surveyor noted a path width of 1/4–1/2 mi (0.40–0.80 km), with the most extreme damage (and most deaths) in the Philadelphia Church community. The surveyor noted that:

Trees were taken up by the roots and hurled with fearful rapidity through the air and those not uprooted had all the bark taken off. The scene after the storm, particularly the position of the prostrate trees, indicated a convergence toward the center, as if a vacuum was created there and the wind rushed in from either side to fill it.

A second, detailed survey of the path was made 10 days later by J. A. Holmes; his findings were published in the Elisha Mitchell Scientific Society journal for 1884.

== Other effects ==
Elsewhere, wind damage, flash floods and derecho-like effects were also reported in published accounts of the outbreak. Homes were swept away by water in Louisville, Kentucky, New Albany, Indiana, and Jeffersonville, Indiana, as well as in other towns along the Ohio River. Blizzard conditions occurred in the eastern Midwest. In Tennessee the mid-latitude system associated with the outbreak generated severe thunderstorms that produced strong, destructive winds on February 19. These winds caused "great" damage to forestland, fencing, and housing, especially in and near Clarksville.

== Aftermath, recovery, and records ==
The total impact of the outbreak was never adequately quantified and hence has been considered enigmatic. Individual deaths may have been counted multiple times, leading to an exaggerated death toll, but on the other hand rural Black dead may have been undercounted, many of whom were undocumented sharecroppers. Of thousands reported dead, the names of fewer than 100 could be verified. According to an article appearing in the Statesville (NC) Landmark three days later, the damage tally in Georgia alone was estimated to be $1 million, in 1884 dollars. Tabulations from 1884 estimate a total of $3–4 million in tornado damage (with an unknown amount of flood and other damage), with 10,000 structures destroyed, as many as 800 dead, and up to 2,500 injured. The same reported an estimated 60 tornadoes and called the outbreak the worst in U.S. history to date. Between 10,000 and 15,000 people were reportedly rendered homeless and even said to be "starving". The outbreak produced the largest 24-hour total of killer tornadoes until the 1974 Super Outbreak. The precise number of tornadoes as well as fatalities incurred during the outbreak is unknown, but the death toll was variously estimated to range from 370 to 2,000 at the time. A reliable survey by the Signal Corps in 1889 located 182 fatalities, and a reanalysis by tornado researcher Thomas P. Grazulis in 1993 counted 178 deaths.

== See also ==
- List of North American tornadoes and tornado outbreaks
- April 1924 tornado outbreak – Yielded a devastating F4 tornado in South Carolina
- 1932 Deep South tornado outbreak – Caused hundreds of fatalities in the same area
- 1984 Carolinas tornado outbreak – Produced numerous violent, deadly tornadoes
- 1994 Palm Sunday tornado outbreak – Generated several intense, long-lived tornadoes in Georgia and the Carolinas

== Sources ==
- Agee, Ernest M.; Childs, Samuel (June 1, 2014). "Adjustments in Tornado Counts, F-Scale Intensity, and Path Width for Assessing Significant Tornado Destruction". Journal of Applied Meteorology and Climatology. 53 (6). American Meteorological Society: 1494–1505. Bibcode:2014JApMC..53.1494A. doi:10.1175/JAMC-D-13-0235.1.
- Brooks, Harold E. (April 2004). "On the Relationship of Tornado Path Length and Width to Intensity". Weather and Forecasting. 19 (2): 310–19. Bibcode:2004WtFor..19..310B. doi:10.1175/1520-0434(2004)019<0310:OTROTP>2.0.CO;2.
- Cook, A. R.; Schaefer, J. T. (August 2008). "The Relation of El Niño–Southern Oscillation (ENSO) to Winter Tornado Outbreaks". Monthly Weather Review. 136 (8): 3121–3137. Bibcode:2008MWRv..136.3121C. doi:10.1175/2007MWR2171.1.
- Edwards, Roger; LaDue, James G.; Ferree, John T.; Scharfenberg, Kevin; Maier, Chris; Coulbourne, William L. (May 1, 2013). "Tornado Intensity Estimation: Past, Present, and Future". Bulletin of the American Meteorological Society. 94 (5). American Meteorological Society: 641–653. Bibcode:2013BAMS...94..641E. doi:10.1175/BAMS-D-11-00006.1.
- Finley, John Park (1887). Tornadoes, what they are and how to observe them, with practical suggestions for the protection of life and property. New York City: Insurance Monitor. LCCN 48036680 – via Internet Archive.
- Grazulis, Thomas P. (May 1984). Violent Tornado Climatography, 1880–1982. OSTI (Technical report). NUREG. Washington, D.C.: Nuclear Regulatory Commission. OSTI 7099491. CR-3670.
  - — (November 1990). Significant Tornadoes 1880–1989. Vol. 2. St. Johnsbury, Vermont: The Tornado Project of Environmental Films. ISBN 1-879362-02-3.
  - — (July 1993). Significant Tornadoes 1680–1991: A Chronology and Analysis of Events. St. Johnsbury, Vermont: The Tornado Project of Environmental Films. ISBN 1-879362-03-1.
  - — (2001a). The Tornado: Nature's Ultimate Windstorm. Norman: University of Oklahoma Press. ISBN 978-0-8061-3538-0.
  - — (2001b). F5-F6 Tornadoes. St. Johnsbury, Vermont: The Tornado Project of Environmental Films.
- Kincer, J. B. (May 1936). "Tornado disasters in the Southeastern states, April 1936". Monthly Weather Review. 65 (5). Washington, D.C.: United States Weather Bureau: 168–171. Bibcode:1936MWRv...64..168K. doi:10.1175/1520-0493(1936)64<168:TDITSS>2.0.CO;2.
- "Notes and extracts". Monthly Weather Review. 12 (2). Washington, D.C.: United States Army Signal Corps: 61–2. February 1884. doi:10.1175/1520-0493(1884)12[61:NAE]2.0.CO;2 – via American Meteorological Society.
- Stevens, Welby R. (April 25, 1925). Written at Montgomery, Alabama. Henry, Alfred J.; Varney, Burton M. (eds.). "Tornadoes in Alabama" (PDF). Monthly Weather Review. 53 (10). Washington, D.C. (published October 1925): 437–43. Bibcode:1925MWRv...53..437S. doi:10.1175/1520-0493(1925)53<437:TIA>2.0.CO;2. Archived from the original (PDF) on March 3, 2016.
