= Goose Creek Township, Union County, North Carolina =

Coordinates: 35.11400°N 80.50907°W

- Township
- Location of Goose Creek Township in Union County

- Location of Union County in North Carolina
- Country: United States
- State: North Carolina
- County: Union

Area
  - Total: 83.10 sq mi (215.22 km^{2})
- Highest elevation (western side of township): 720 ft (220 m)
- Lowest elevation (Floodplain of Rocky River in northeastern corner): 378 ft (115 m)

Population (2010)
  - Total: 14,773
  - Density: 177.77/sq mi (68.64/km^{2})
- Time zone: UTC-4 (EST)
  - Summer (DST): UTC-5 (EDT)
- Area code: 704

Goose Creek Township, population 14,773, is one of nine townships in Union County, North Carolina. Goose Creek Township is 83.10 square miles (215.2 km^{2}) in size and is located in north-central Union County. This township includes a small part of the City of Monroe, plus parts of the Towns of Fairview (entirely), Indian Trail, Stallings, and Unionville.

== Geography ==
The northeast boundary of the township is defined by the Rocky River and most of the township is drained by the Rocky River's tributaries. These include Clear Creek, Crooked Creek, Goose Creek, and Grassy Creek. The south side of the township is drained by tributaries to Ricardson Creek and include Chinkapin Creek, Mill Creek, Stumplick Creek, and Watson Creek.
