= Buford Township, Union County, North Carolina =

Coordinates: 34.87720°N 80.54821°W

- Township
- Location of Buford Township in Union County

- Location of Union County in North Carolina
- Country: United States
- State: North Carolina
- County: Union

Area
  - Total: 98.95 sq mi (256.28 km^{2})
- Highest elevation (northeast quarter of township): 748 ft (228 m)
- Lowest elevation (Lynches River at southern boundary): 478 ft (146 m)

Population (2010)
  - Total: 10,323
  - Density: 104.32/sq mi (40.28/km^{2})
- Time zone: UTC-4 (EST)
  - Summer (DST): UTC-5 (EDT)
- Area code: 704

Buford Township, population 10,323, is one of nine townships in Union County, North Carolina. Buford Township is 98.95 square miles (256.3 km^{2}) in size and is located in south-central Union County. The Town of Mineral Springs, North Carolina barely covers the northwest of corner of the township.

== Geography ==
The northside of the township is drained by tributaries to Richardson Creek including Adams Branch, Beaverdam Creek, Little Richardson Creek, and Rays Fork. The east side of the township is drained by Lanes Creek and its tributaries, Wicker Branch and Mill Creek. The southside of the township is drained by the Lynches River and its tributaries Buffalo Creek and Polecat Creek. The southwest side is drained by Cane Creek. The west side is drained by Glen Branch of Waxhaw Creek.
