= Stegall Branch =

Stream in North Carolina, USA

Stegall Branch Tributary to Richardson Creek
- Location of Stegall Branch mouth Stegall Branch (the United States)

Location
- Country: United States
- State: North Carolina
- County: Union

Physical characteristics
- Source: divide of unnamed tributary to Rocky River
  - location: pond about 1 mile east of New Salem, North Carolina
  - coordinates: 35°08′10″N 080°20′42″W
  - elevation: 465 ft (142 m)
- Mouth: Richardson Creek
  - location: about 2 miles southeast of New Salem, North Carolina
  - coordinates: 35°07′09″N 080°20′09″W
  - elevation: 345 ft (105 m)
- Length: 1.63 mi (2.62 km)
- Basin size: 1.30 square miles (3.4 km^{2})
- Discharge
  - location: Richardson Creek
  - average: 2.05 cu ft/s (0.058 m^{3}/s) at mouth with Richardson Creek

Basin features
- Progression: Richardson Creek → Rocky River → Pee Dee River → Winyah Bay → Atlantic Ocean
- River system: Pee Dee
- Tributaries
  - left: unnamed tributaries
  - right: unnamed tributaries
- Bridges: none

Stegall Branch is a 1.30 mi (2.09 km) long 1st order tributary to Richardson Creek in Union County, North Carolina. This is the only stream of this name in the United States.

== Course ==
Stegall Branch rises in a pond about 1 mile east of New Salem, North Carolina and then flows southeast to join Richardson Creek about 2 miles southeast of New Salem.

== Watershed ==
Stegall Branch drains 1.63 square miles (4.2 km^{2}) of area, receives about 48.0 in/year of precipitation, has a wetness index of 386.52, and is about 42% forested.
