= Pine Log Creek (Richardson Creek tributary) =

Stream in North Carolina, USA

Pine Log Creek Tributary to Richardson Creek
- Location of Pine Log Creek mouth Pine Log Creek (Richardson Creek tributary) (the United States)

Location
- Country: United States
- State: North Carolina
- County: Anson

Physical characteristics
- Source: Cribs Creek divide
  - location: about 1.5 miles northeast of Fountain Hill, North Carolina
  - coordinates: 35°05′55″N 80°15′21″W
  - elevation: 478 ft (146 m)
- Mouth: Richardson Creek
  - location: about 6 miles northwest of Burnsville, North Carolina (Anson County)
  - coordinates: 35°08′38″N 80°16′35″W
  - elevation: 276 ft (84 m)
- Length: 3.38 mi (5.44 km)
- Basin size: 5.99 square miles (15.5 km^{2})
- Discharge
  - location: Richardson Creek
  - average: 7.14 cu ft/s (0.202 m^{3}/s) at mouth with Richardson Creek

Basin features
- Progression: Richardson Creek → Rocky River → Pee Dee River → Winyah Bay → Atlantic Ocean
- River system: Pee Dee
- Tributaries
  - left: unnamed tributaries
  - right: unnamed tributaries
- Bridges: Olive Branch Road, Pine Log Road

Pine Log Creek is a 3.38 mi (5.44 km) long 2nd order tributary to Richardson Creek in Anson County, North Carolina.

== Course ==
Pine Log Creek rises about 1.5 miles northeast of Fountain Hill, North Carolina and then flows northwest to join Richardson Creek about 6 miles northwest of Burnsville.

== Watershed ==
Pine Log Creek drains 5.99 square miles (15.5 km^{2}) of area, receives about 48.1 in/year of precipitation, has a wetness index of 378.38, and is about 54% forested.

== Additional Maps ==
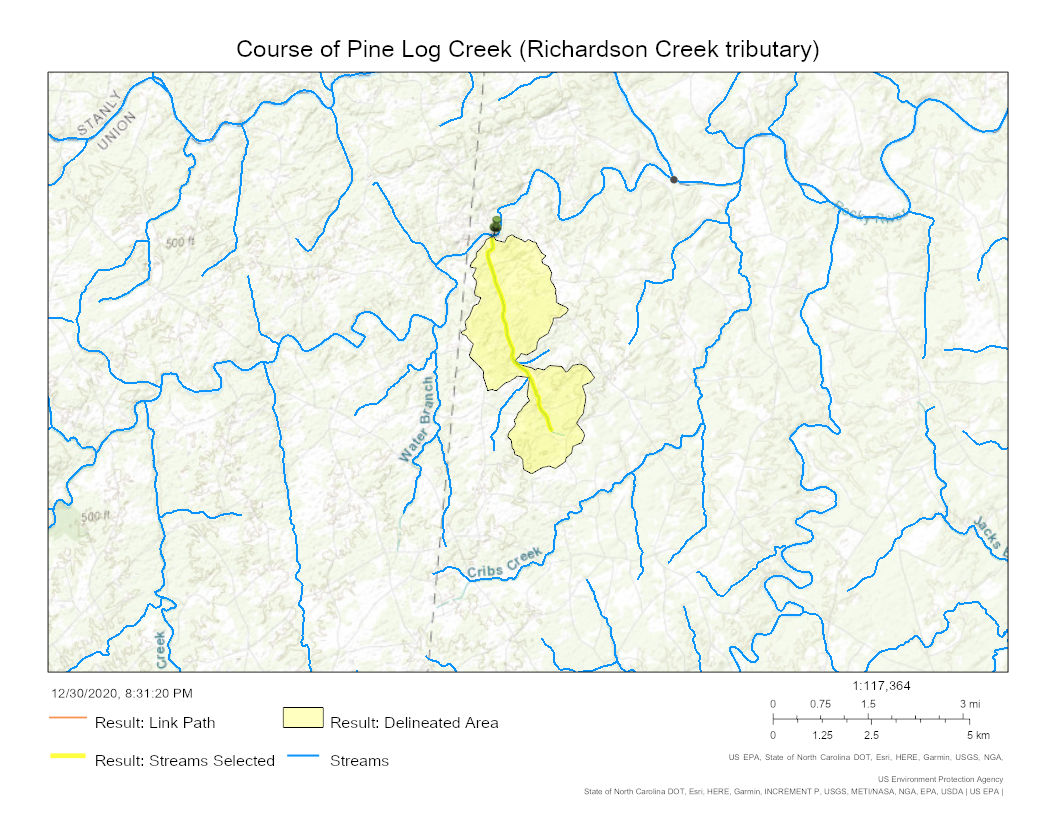
Course of Pine Log Creek (Richardson Creek tributary) in Anson County, North Carolina

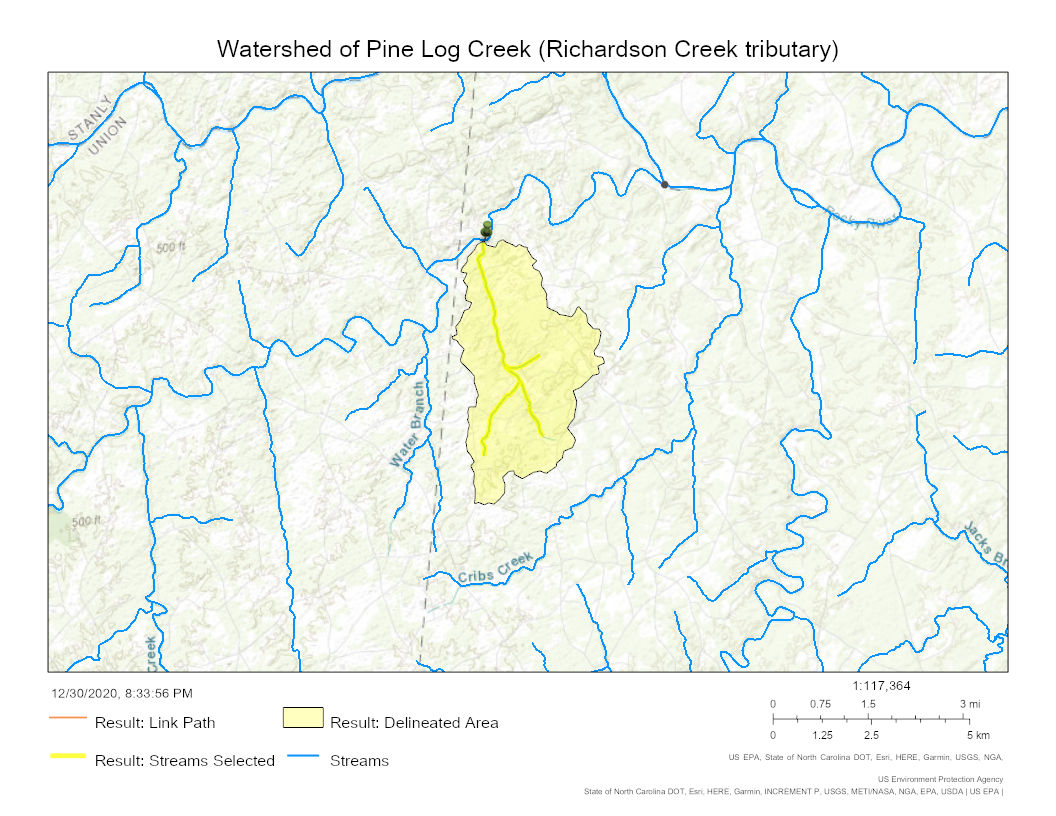
Watershed of Pine Log Creek (Richardson Creek tributary) in Anson County, North Carolina
