= Camp Branch =

Camp Branch may refer to:

- Camp Branch (Big Creek), a stream in Missouri
- Camp Branch (Flat Creek), a stream in Missouri
- Camp Branch (West Fork Clear Creek), a stream in Missouri
- Camp Branch (Rocky River tributary), a stream in Anson County, North Carolina
- Camp Branch (Swannanoa River tributary), a stream in Buncombe County, North Carolina
- Camp Branch (Fisher River tributary), a stream in Surry County, North Carolina
- Camp Branch Wetlands Natural Area Preserve in Floyd County, Virginia
- A protected property near Mattair Springs, Florida
- Camp Branch Correctional Facility, a state prison in Michigan that closed in 2009 (List of Michigan state prisons)
