= Goose Creek (Rocky River tributary) =

Stream in North Carolina, USA

Goose Creek Tributary to Rocky River
- Location of Goose Creek mouth Goose Creek (Rocky River tributary) (the United States)

Location
- Country: United States
- State: North Carolina
- County: Union; Mecklenburg
- City: Mint Hill

Physical characteristics
- Source: Clear Creek divide
  - location: Mint Hill, North Carolina
  - coordinates: 35°10′41″N 80°37′56″W
  - elevation: 735 ft (224 m)
- Mouth: Rocky River
  - location: about 4 miles northeast of Fairview, North Carolina (Union County)
  - coordinates: 35°10′54″N 80°30′14″W
  - elevation: 441 ft (134 m)
- Length: 15.41 mi (24.80 km)
- Basin size: 42.27 square miles (109.5 km^{2})
- Discharge
  - location: Rocky River
  - average: 47.18 cu ft/s (1.336 m^{3}/s) at mouth with Rocky River

Basin features
- Progression: Rocky River → Pee Dee River → Winyah Bay → Atlantic Ocean
- River system: Pee Dee
- Tributaries
  - left: Paddle Branch; Duck Creek
  - right: Stevens Creek
- Bridges: Quail Park Drive, Lawyers Road, Mill Grove Road, W Lawyers Road, Howey Bottoms Road, NC 218, US 601, E Brief Road

Goose Creek is a 15.41 mi (24.80 km) long 3rd order tributary to the Rocky River in Union County, North Carolina.

== Course ==
Goose Creek rises in Mint Hill, North Carolina in Mecklenburg County. Goose Creek then flows south into Union County and turns northeast to join the Rocky River about 4 miles northeast of Fairview.

== Watershed ==
Goose Creek drains 42.27 square miles (109.5 km^{2}) of area, receives about 47.6 in/year of precipitation, has a wetness index of 441.26, and is about 46% forested.
