= Watson Creek =

Watson Creek may refer to:

- Watson Creek (California)
- Watson Creek (Minnesota)
- Watson Creek (Pennsylvania)
- Watson Creek (Richardson Creek tributary), a stream in Union County, North Carolina
