= Salem Creek (Richardson Creek tributary) =

Stream in North Carolina, USA

Salem Creek Tributary to Richardson Creek
- Location of Salem Creek mouth Salem Creek (Richardson Creek tributary) (the United States)

Location
- Country: United States
- State: North Carolina
- County: Union

Physical characteristics
- Source: Maple Springs Branch divide
  - location: pond about 1 mile southeast of Wingate, North Carolina
  - coordinates: 34°58′19″N 080°24′40″W
  - elevation: 565 ft (172 m)
- Mouth: Richardson Creek
  - location: about 2 miles south-southwest of New Salem, North Carolina
  - coordinates: 35°06′21″N 080°22′23″W
  - elevation: 368 ft (112 m)
- Length: 6.21 mi (9.99 km)
- Basin size: 9.82 square miles (25.4 km^{2})
- Discharge
  - location: Richardson Creek
  - average: 30.91 cu ft/s (0.875 m^{3}/s) at mouth with Richardson Creek

Basin features
- Progression: Richardson Creek → Rocky River → Pee Dee River → Winyah Bay → Atlantic Ocean
- River system: Pee Dee
- Tributaries
  - left: Austin Branch; Jacks Branch
  - right: Buck Branch; Becky Branch
- Bridges: Forest Hills School Road, US 74, Austin Grove Church Road, NC 205, Ansonville Road, Lucy Short Cut Road, Olive Branch Road

Salem Creek is a 6.21 mi (9.99 km) long 3rd order tributary to Richardson Creek in Union County, North Carolina.

== Variant names ==
According to the Geographic Names Information System, it has also been known historically as:

- Negro Head Creek
- Negrohead Creek
- Niggerhead Creek

== Course ==
Salem Creek rises in a pond about 1 mile southeast of Wingate, North Carolina and then flows north to join Richardson Creek about 2 miles south-southwest of New Salem.

== Watershed ==
Salem Creek drains 9.82 square miles (25.4 km^{2}) of area, receives about 48.2 in/year of precipitation, has a wetness index of 412.32, and is about 36% forested.
