= Water Branch (Richardson Creek tributary) =

Stream in North Carolina, USA

Water Branch Tributary to Richardson Creek
- Location of Water Branch mouth Water Branch (Richardson Creek tributary) (the United States)

Location
- Country: United States
- State: North Carolina
- County: Union

Physical characteristics
- Source: Cribs Creek divide
  - location: pond about 1 mile west of Fountain Hill, North Carolina
  - coordinates: 35°04′15″N 080°18′13″W
  - elevation: 525 ft (160 m)
- Mouth: Richardson Creek
  - location: about 1.5 miles northeast of Olive Branch, North Carolina
  - coordinates: 35°07′24″N 080°17′34″W
  - elevation: 298 ft (91 m)
- Length: 3.47 mi (5.58 km)
- Basin size: 6.48 square miles (16.8 km^{2})
- Discharge
  - location: Richardson Creek
  - average: 7.69 cu ft/s (0.218 m^{3}/s) at mouth with Richardson Creek

Basin features
- Progression: Richardson Creek → Rocky River → Pee Dee River → Winyah Bay → Atlantic Ocean
- River system: Pee Dee
- Tributaries
  - left: Little Water Branch
  - right: unnamed tributaries
- Bridges: NC 218, Burnsville Road, Jerusalem Church Road

Water Branch is a 3.47 mi (5.58 km) long 2nd order tributary to Richardson Creek in Union County, North Carolina.

== Course ==
Water Branch rises in a pond about 1 mile west of Fountain Hill, North Carolina and then flows north to join Richardson Creek about 1.5 miles northeast of Olive Branch.

== Watershed ==
Water Branch drains 6.48 square miles (16.8 km^{2}) of area, receives about 48.0 in/year of precipitation, has a wetness index of 389.10, and is about 36% forested.

== Additional Maps ==
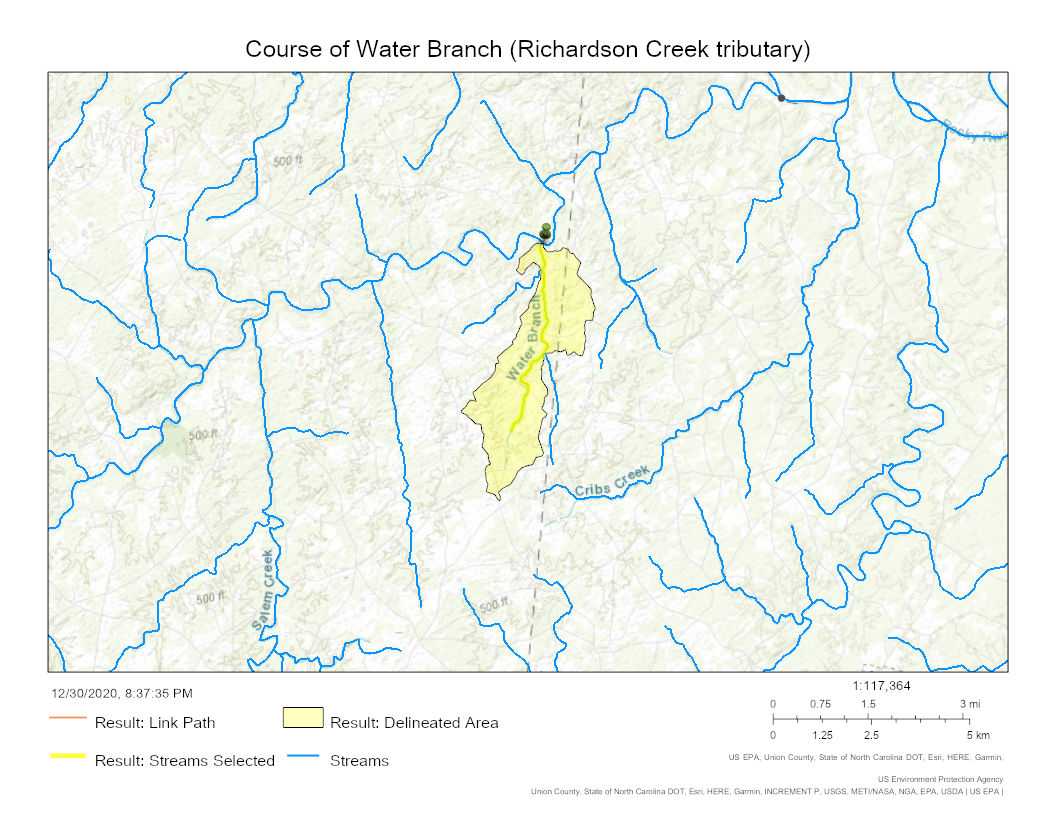
Course of Water Branch (Richardson Creek tributary) in Union County, North Carolina

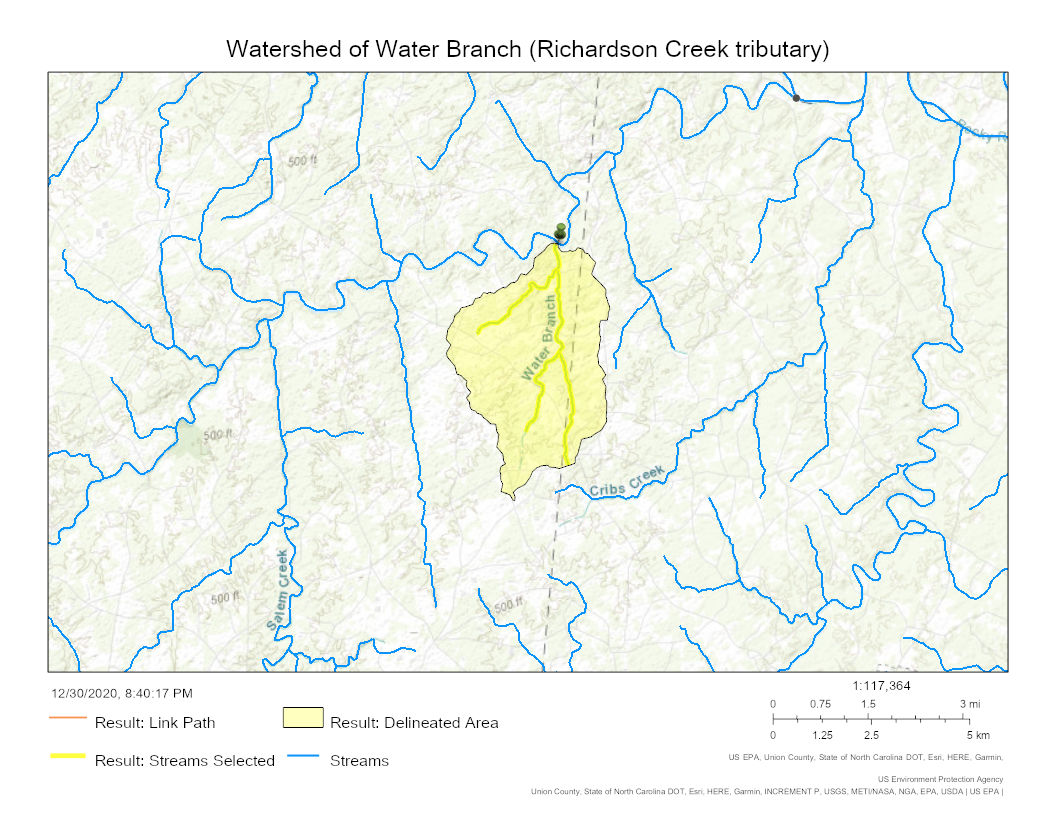
Watershed of Water Branch (Richardson Creek tributary) in Union County, North Carolina
