= Reason Branch =

Stream in North Carolina, USA

Reason Branch Tributary to Rocky River
- Location of Reason Branch mouth Reason Branch (the United States)

Location
- Country: United States
- State: North Carolina
- County: Union

Physical characteristics
- Source: Gold Branch divide
  - location: pond about 1 mile west of New Salem, North Carolina
  - coordinates: 35°07′52″N 80°24′06″W
  - elevation: 545 ft (166 m)
- Mouth: Rocky River
  - location: about 3 miles north-northwest of New Salem, North Carolina
  - coordinates: 35°09′55″N 80°23′21″W
  - elevation: 338 ft (103 m)
- Length: 3.04 mi (4.89 km)
- Basin size: 3.85 square miles (10.0 km^{2})
- Discharge
  - location: Rocky River
  - average: 4.00 cu ft/s (0.113 m^{3}/s) at mouth with Rocky River

Basin features
- Progression: Rocky River → Pee Dee River → Winyah Bay → Atlantic Ocean
- River system: Pee Dee
- Tributaries
  - left: unnamed tributaries
  - right: Bull Branch
- Bridges: Morgan Academy Road

Reason Branch is a 3.04 mi (4.89 km) long 1st order tributary to the Rocky River in Union County, North Carolina. This is the only stream of this name in the United States.

== Course ==
Reason Branch rises in a pond about 1 mile west of New Salem, North Carolina and then flows northeast to join the Rocky River about 3 miles north-northwest of New Salem.

== Watershed ==
Reason Branch drains 3.25 square miles (8.4 km^{2}) of area, receives about 48.0 in/year of precipitation, has a wetness index of 393.52, and is about 43% forested.
