= Mill Creek (Richardson Creek tributary) =

Stream in North Carolina, USA

Mill Creek Tributary to Richardson Creek
- Location of Mill Creek mouth Mill Creek (Richardson Creek tributary) (the United States)

Location
- Country: United States
- State: North Carolina
- County: Union

Physical characteristics
- Source: Grassy Creek divide
  - location: pond about 1.5 miles northeast of Unionville, North Carolina
  - coordinates: 35°05′56″N 080°28′53″W
  - elevation: 592 ft (180 m)
- Mouth: Richardson Creek
  - location: about 5 miles east-northeast of Fowler Crossroads, North Carolina
  - coordinates: 35°02′53″N 080°27′37″W
  - elevation: 435 ft (133 m)
- Length: 4.08 mi (6.57 km)
- Basin size: 5.46 square miles (14.1 km^{2})
- Discharge
  - location: Richardson Creek
  - average: 6.76 cu ft/s (0.191 m^{3}/s) at mouth with Richardson Creek

Basin features
- Progression: Richardson Creek → Rocky River → Pee Dee River → Winyah Bay → Atlantic Ocean
- River system: Pee Dee
- Tributaries
  - left: unnamed tributaries
  - right: Little Mill Creek
- Bridges: Pursher Rushing Road, Supreme Drive, Morgan Mill Road, Sincerity Road, New Salem Road

Mill Creek is a 4.08 mi (6.57 km) long 2nd order tributary to Richardson Creek in Union County, North Carolina.

== Course ==
Mill Creek rises in a pond about 1.5 miles northeast of Unionville, North Carolina and then flows south-southeast to join Richardson Creek about 5 miles east-northeast of Fowler Crossroads.

== Watershed ==
Mill Creek drains 5.46 square miles (14.1 km^{2}) of area, receives about 48.5 in/year of precipitation, has a wetness index of 426.53, and is about 39% forested.
