= Gourdvine Creek (Richardson Creek tributary) =

Stream in North Carolina, USA

Gourdvine Creek Tributary to Richardson Creek
- Location of Gourdvine Creek mouth Gourdvine Creek (Richardson Creek tributary) (the United States)

Location
- Country: United States
- State: North Carolina
- County: Union

Physical characteristics
- Source: Maness Branch divide
  - location: pond about 1.5 miles southeast of Hamilton Crossroads, North Carolina
  - coordinates: 35°01′59″N 080°19′33″W
  - elevation: 548 ft (167 m)
- Mouth: Richardson Creek
  - location: about 2 miles southeast of New Salem, North Carolina
  - coordinates: 35°06′52″N 080°20′25″W
  - elevation: 348 ft (106 m)
- Length: 5.59 mi (9.00 km)
- Basin size: 9.82 square miles (25.4 km^{2})
- Discharge
  - location: Richardson Creek
  - average: 11.54 cu ft/s (0.327 m^{3}/s) at mouth with Richardson Creek

Basin features
- Progression: Richardson Creek → Rocky River → Pee Dee River → Winyah Bay → Atlantic Ocean
- River system: Pee Dee
- Tributaries
  - left: unnamed tributaries
  - right: Gold Branch; Smith Branch
- Bridges: Ansonville Road, Olive Branch Road, Bunn Simpson Road, Holly School Road

Gourdvine Creek is a 5.59 mi (9.00 km) long 1st order tributary to Richardson Creek in Union County, North Carolina.

== Variant names ==
According to the Geographic Names Information System, it has also been known historically as:

- Gourd Wine Creek

== Course ==
Gourdvine Creek rises in a pond about 1.5 miles southeast of Hamilton Crossroads, North Carolina and then flows north to join Richardson Creek about 2 miles southeast of New Salem.

== Watershed ==
Gourdvine Creek drains 9.82 square miles (25.4 km^{2}) of area, receives about 48.1 in/year of precipitation, has a wetness index of 401.82, and is about 33% forested.
