= Bull Branch (Richardson Creek tributary) =

Stream in North Carolina, USA

Bull Branch Tributary to Richardson Creek
- Location of Bull Branch mouth Bull Branch (Richardson Creek tributary) (the United States)

Location
- Country: United States
- State: North Carolina
- County: Union

Physical characteristics
- Source: Austin Branch divide
  - location: about 2 miles northeast of Wingate, North Carolina
  - coordinates: 35°00′46″N 080°25′35″W
  - elevation: 555 ft (169 m)
- Mouth: Richardson Creek
  - location: about 2 miles southwest of Watson, North Carolina
  - coordinates: 35°03′09″N 080°26′17″W
  - elevation: 412 ft (126 m)
- Length: 2.31 mi (3.72 km)
- Basin size: 3.23 square miles (8.4 km^{2})
- Discharge
  - location: Richardson Creek
  - average: 4.09 cu ft/s (0.116 m^{3}/s) at mouth with Richardson Creek

Basin features
- Progression: Richardson Creek → Rocky River → Pee Dee River → Winyah Bay → Atlantic Ocean
- River system: Pee Dee
- Tributaries
  - left: unnamed tributaries
  - right: unnamed tributaries
- Bridges: Olive Branch Road, E Lawyers Road

Bull Branch is a 2.31 mi (3.72 km) long 1st order tributary to Richardson Creek in Union County, North Carolina, United States.

== Course ==
Bull Branch rises about 2 miles northeast of Wingate, North Carolina and then flows northwest to join Richardson Creek about 2 miles southwest of Watson.

== Watershed ==
Bull Branch drains 3.23 square miles (8.4 km^{2}) of area, receives about 48.3 in/year of precipitation, has a wetness index of 405.73, and is about 39% forested.
