= Back Creek (Rocky River tributary) =

Stream in North Carolina, USA

Back Creek Tributary to Rocky River
- Location of Back Creek mouth Back Creek (Rocky River tributary) (the United States)

Location
- Country: United States
- State: North Carolina
- County: Cabarrus; Mecklenburg
- City: Harrisburg; Charlotte

Physical characteristics
- Source: Reedy Creek divide
  - location: northeast Charlotte, North Carolina
  - coordinates: 35°15′48″N 080°43′50″W
  - elevation: 800 ft (240 m)
- Mouth: Rocky River
  - location: about 1.5 miles southeast of Pharrs Mill, North Carolina
  - coordinates: 35°18′59″N 080°35′44″W
  - elevation: 518 ft (158 m)
- Length: 18.58 mi (29.90 km)
- Basin size: 40.11 square miles (103.9 km^{2})
- Discharge
  - location: Rocky River
  - average: 17.59 cu ft/s (0.498 m^{3}/s) at mouth with Rocky River

Basin features
- Progression: Rocky River → Pee Dee River → Winyah Bay → Atlantic Ocean
- River system: Pee Dee River
- Tributaries
  - left: unnamed tributaries
  - right: Fuda Creek
- Bridges: Grier Road, NC 24, S Devon Street, Rocky River Road, Back Creek Road, NC 24, McLean Road, Katherine Kiker Road, Back Creek Church Road, I-485, Caldwell Park Road, Robinson Church Road, Hickory Ridge Road, Raging Ridge Road, Pharr Mill Road

Back Creek is a 11.59 mi (18.65 km) long 2nd order tributary to the Rocky River in Cabarrus County, North Carolina.

== Variant names ==
According to the Geographic Names Information System, it has also been known historically as:

- Black Creek
- Buck Creek

== Course ==
Back Creek rises in a pond in northeastern Charlotte, North Carolina and then flows easterly through the northern suburbs of Charlotte into Cabarrus County to join the Rocky River about 1.5 miles southeast of Pharrs Mill.

== Watershed ==
Back Creek drains 40.11 square miles (103.9 km^{2}) of area, receives about 46.9 in/year of precipitation, has a wetness index of 439.32, and is about 25% forested.
