= Gold Branch (Richardson Creek tributary) =

Stream in North Carolina, USA

Gold Branch Tributary to Richardson Creek
- Location of Gold Branch mouth Gold Branch (Richardson Creek tributary) (the United States)

Location
- Country: United States
- State: North Carolina
- County: Union

Physical characteristics
- Source: Crisco Branch divide
  - location: pond about 1.5 miles southwest of New Salem, North Carolina
  - coordinates: 35°07′36″N 080°24′08″W
  - elevation: 560 ft (170 m)
- Mouth: Richardson Creek
  - location: north end of Polk Mountain
  - coordinates: 35°05′40″N 080°23′13″W
  - elevation: 385 ft (117 m)
- Length: 3.19 mi (5.13 km)
- Basin size: 4.66 square miles (12.1 km^{2})
- Discharge
  - location: Richardson Creek
  - average: 5.70 cu ft/s (0.161 m^{3}/s) at mouth with Richardson Creek

Basin features
- Progression: Richardson Creek → Rocky River → Pee Dee River → Winyah Bay → Atlantic Ocean
- River system: Pee Dee
- Tributaries
  - left: unnamed tributaries
  - right: Brandon Branch
- Bridges: Little Staton Road, New Salem Road, New Hope Church Road

Gold Branch is a 3.19 mi (5.13 km) long 2nd order tributary to Richardson Creek in Union County, North Carolina.

== Course ==
Gold Branch rises in a pond about 1.5 miles southwest of New Salem, North Carolina and then flows south to join Richardson Creek at the north end of Polk Mountain.

== Watershed ==
Gold Branch drains 4.66 square miles (12.1 km^{2}) of area, receives about 48.0 in/year of precipitation, has a wetness index of 420.59, and is about 36% forested.
