= Crisco Branch =

Stream in North Carolina, USA

Crisco Branch Tributary to Rocky River
- Location of Crisco Branch mouth Crisco Branch (the United States)

Location
- Country: United States
- State: North Carolina
- County: Union

Physical characteristics
- Source: Gold Branch divide
  - location: about 0.5 miles west-southwest of New Salem, North Carolina
  - coordinates: 35°07′44″N 80°23′09″W
  - elevation: 530 ft (160 m)
- Mouth: Rocky River
  - location: about 3 miles north-northeast of New Salem, North Carolina
  - coordinates: 35°09′59″N 80°21′38″W
  - elevation: 328 ft (100 m)
- Length: 3.67 mi (5.91 km)
- Basin size: 3.85 square miles (10.0 km^{2})
- Discharge
  - location: Rocky River
  - average: 4.72 cu ft/s (0.134 m^{3}/s) at mouth with Rocky River

Basin features
- Progression: Rocky River → Pee Dee River → Winyah Bay → Atlantic Ocean
- River system: Pee Dee
- Tributaries
  - left: unnamed tributaries
  - right: unnamed tributaries
- Bridges: NC 218, Army Road

Crisco Branch is a 3.67 mi (5.91 km) long 2nd order tributary to the Rocky River in Union County, North Carolina. This is the only stream of this name in the United States.

== Course ==
Crisco Branch rises about 0.5 miles west-southwest of New Salem, North Carolina and then flows north-northeast to join the Rocky River about 3 miles north-northeast of New Salem.

== Watershed ==
Crisco Branch drains 3.85 square miles (10.0 km^{2}) of area, receives about 48.0 in/year of precipitation, has a wetness index of 414.50, and is about 42% forested.
