= Stewarts Creek (Richardson Creek tributary) =

Stream in North Carolina, USA

Stewarts Creek Tributary to Richardson Creek
- Location of Stewarts Creek mouth Stewarts Creek (Richardson Creek tributary) (the United States)

Location
- Country: United States
- State: North Carolina
- County: Union

Physical characteristics
- Source: Twelvemile Creek divide
  - location: about 3 miles northwest of Monroe, North Carolina
  - coordinates: 35°02′16″N 080°37′00″W
  - elevation: 650 ft (200 m)
- Mouth: Richardson Creek
  - location: about 0.25 miles downstream of Lake Twitty Dam
  - coordinates: 35°02′17″N 080°28′11″W
  - elevation: 442 ft (135 m)
- Length: 11.55 mi (18.59 km)
- Basin size: 35.36 square miles (91.6 km^{2})
- Discharge
  - location: Richardson Creek
  - average: 41.31 cu ft/s (1.170 m^{3}/s) at mouth with Richardson Creek

Basin features
- Progression: Richardson Creek → Rocky River → Pee Dee River → Winyah Bay → Atlantic Ocean
- River system: Pee Dee
- Tributaries
  - left: E Fork Stewarts Creek; Stumplick Branch; Chinkapin Creek
  - right: Lick Branch
- Waterbodies: Lake Twitty
- Bridges: Shiloh Club Road, US 74, Myers Road, N Rocky River Road, James Hamilton Road, Fowler Secrest Road, Secrest Shortcut Road, US 601, US 74, Morgan Mill Road, Old Camden Road

Stewarts Creek is a 11.55 mi (18.59 km) long 3rd order tributary to Richardson Creek in Union County, North Carolina.

== Course ==
Stewarts Creek rises about 3 miles northwest of Monroe, North Carolina and then flows southeast and curves northeast to join Richardson Creek about 0.25 miles downstream of the Lake Twitty Dam.

== Watershed ==
Stewarts Creek drains 35.36 square miles (91.6 km^{2}) of area, receives about 48.4 in/year of precipitation, has a wetness index of 452.64, and is about 28% forested.
