= Bearskin Creek =

Bearskin Creek may refer to:

- Bearskin Creek (Banister River tributary), Pittsylvania County, Virginia
- Bearskin Creek (Richardson Creek tributary), Union County, North Carolina
