= New Salem Township =

New Salem Township may refer to the following townships in the United States:

- New Salem Township, McDonough County, Illinois
- New Salem Township, Pike County, Illinois
- New Salem Township, Union County, North Carolina
