= Meadow Branch (Richardson Creek tributary) =

Stream in North Carolina, USA

Meadow Branch Tributary to Richardson Creek
- Location of Meadow Branch mouth Meadow Branch (Richardson Creek tributary) (the United States)

Location
- Country: United States
- State: North Carolina
- County: Union
- City: Wingate

Physical characteristics
- Source: Horsepen Branch divide
  - location: about 1 mile southeast of Wingate, North Carolina
  - coordinates: 34°58′08″N 080°25′32″W
  - elevation: 568 ft (173 m)
- Mouth: Richardson Creek
  - location: about 2.5 miles southwest of Watson, North Carolina
  - coordinates: 35°02′36″N 080°26′53″W
  - elevation: 421 ft (128 m)
- Length: 6.84 mi (11.01 km)
- Basin size: 7.38 square miles (19.1 km^{2})
- Discharge
  - location: Richardson Creek
  - average: 9.08 cu ft/s (0.257 m^{3}/s) at mouth with Richardson Creek

Basin features
- Progression: Richardson Creek → Rocky River → Pee Dee River → Winyah Bay → Atlantic Ocean
- River system: Pee Dee
- Tributaries
  - left: Spring Branch
  - right: unnamed tributaries
- Bridges: Camden Road, Old Highway 74, US 74 (Business), E Wilson Street, US 74, McIntyre Road, Monroe-Ansonville Road, Olive Branch Road

Meadow Branch is a 6.84 mi (11.01 km) long 2nd order tributary to Richardson Creek in Union County, North Carolina.

== Course ==
Meadow Branch rises about 1 mile southeast of Wingate, North Carolina and then flows north-northwest to join Richardson Creek about 2.5 miles southwest of Watson.

== Watershed ==
Meadow Branch drains 7.38 square miles (19.1 km^{2}) of area, receives about 48.5 in/year of precipitation, has a wetness index of 444.40, and is about 26% forested.
