= Clear Creek (Rocky River tributary) =

Stream in North Carolina, USA

Clear Creek Tributary to Rocky River
- Location of Clear Creek mouth Clear Creek (Rocky River tributary) (the United States)

Location
- Country: United States
- State: North Carolina
- County: Union; Cabarrus; Mecklenburg
- City: Mint Hill

Physical characteristics
- Source: Irvins Creek divide
  - location: Mint Hill, North Carolina
  - coordinates: 35°11′06″N 080°38′51″W
  - elevation: 738 ft (225 m)
- Mouth: Rocky River
  - location: about 1 mile east-northeast of Brief, North Carolina
  - coordinates: 35°11′06″N 080°30′18″W
  - elevation: 444 ft (135 m)
- Length: 12.41 mi (19.97 km)
- Basin size: 24.62 square miles (63.8 km^{2})
- Discharge
  - location: Rocky River
  - average: 27.97 cu ft/s (0.792 m^{3}/s) at mouth with Rocky River

Basin features
- Progression: Rocky River → Pee Dee River → Winyah Bay → Atlantic Ocean
- River system: Pee Dee River
- Tributaries
  - left: Wiley Branch
  - right: Long Branch
- Bridges: I-485, Pumpkin Way Drive, Bartlett Road, Arlington Church Road, Ferguson Road, Ben Black Road, US 601, Hopewell Church Road

Clear Creek is a 12.41 mi (19.97 km) long 3rd order tributary to the Rocky River in Cabarrus County, North Carolina.

== Variant names ==
According to the Geographic Names Information System, it has also been known historically as:

- Cleur Creek
- Red Creek

== Course ==
Clear Creek rises in Mint Hill in Mecklenburg County, North Carolina. Clear Creek then flows northeast into Cabarrus County and then turns southeast into Union County to meet the Rocky River about 1 mile east-northeast of Brief at the Cabarrus-Union County line.

== Watershed ==
Clear Creek drains 24.62 square miles (63.8 km^{2}) of area, receives about 47.4 in/year of precipitation, has a topographic wetness index of 415.19 and is about 49% forested.
