= Cottonville, North Carolina =

- Unincorporated community
- Location within North Carolina Location within the United States
- Coordinates: 35°11′55″N 80°11′23″W
- Country: United States
- State: North Carolina
- County: Stanly
- Elevation: 420 ft (130 m)
- Time zone: UTC-5 (Eastern (EST))
  - Summer (DST): UTC-4 (EDT)
- Area code: 704
- GNIS feature ID: 1019801

Cottonville is an unincorporated community in Stanly County, North Carolina, United States.

Richardson Creek flows three miles southeast of Cottonville.

An EF1 tornado struck Cottonville on May 11, 2019. Several trees were snapped or uprooted in and around the community.
