= Beaverdam Creek (Richardson Creek tributary) =

Stream in North Carolina, USA

Beaverdam Creek Tributary to Richardson Creek
- Location of Beaverdam Creek mouth Beaverdam Creek (Richardson Creek tributary) (the United States)

Location
- Country: United States
- State: North Carolina
- County: Union

Physical characteristics
- Source: Little Richardson Creek divide
  - location: pond about 0.25 miles northeast of Roughedge, North Carolina
  - coordinates: 34°54′16″N 080°37′14″W
  - elevation: 675 ft (206 m)
- Mouth: Richardson Creek
  - location: about 1.5 miles south of Monroe, North Carolina
  - coordinates: 34°55′16″N 080°37′29″W
  - elevation: 505 ft (154 m)
- Length: 7.87 mi (12.67 km)
- Basin size: 14.59 square miles (37.8 km^{2})
- Discharge
  - location: Richardson Creek
  - average: 17.40 cu ft/s (0.493 m^{3}/s) at mouth with Richardson Creek

Basin features
- Progression: Richardson Creek → Rocky River → Pee Dee River → Winyah Bay → Atlantic Ocean
- River system: Pee Dee
- Tributaries
  - left: unnamed tributaries
  - right: unnamed tributaries
- Bridges: S Rocky River Road, Parks McCorkle Road, S Rocky River Road, Doster Road, Fletcher Broome Road, Lancaster Highway, Griffith Road

Beaverdam Creek is a 7.87 mi (12.67 km) long 2nd order tributary to Richardson Creek in Union County, North Carolina.

== Course ==
Beaverdam Creek rises in a pond about 0.25 miles northeast of Roughedge, North Carolina and then flows north and turns east to join Richardson Creek in about 1.5 miles south of Monroe, North Carolina.

== Watershed ==
Beaverdam Creek drains 14.59 square miles (37.8 km^{2}) of area, receives about 48.4 in/year of precipitation, has a wetness index of 452.99, and is about 38% forested.
