= Olive Branch, North Carolina =

Unincorporated community in North Carolina, US

Coordinates: 35°06′15″N 80°19′16″W

Olive Branch is an unincorporated community located outside the town of Marshville in Union County, North Carolina, United States. Olive Branch is a rural area where the major industry is farming, and is located at the intersection of Highway 218 and Olive Branch Road.

Olive Branch is a populated place located within the Township of New Salem, a minor civil division (MCD) of Union County. Olive Branch appears on the Olive Branch U.S. Geological Survey Map. Union County is in the Eastern Time Zone (UTC -5 hours).

== History ==
Olive Branch as a community was incorporated formally in 1875. There is not an explanation for the reason of the name of the community but it more than likely had to do with wanting peace after a division of some sort. More information would have to come to light to know any more about this.

Before this a meeting house was established on the hills above Gourdvine Creek that trails off from Richardson Creek on Olive Branch-Monroe Road near the present day E. L. Davis Cemetery.

== Landmarks ==
=== Churches ===
- Olive Branch Baptist Church
- Olive Branch Missionary Baptist Church
- Pleasant Hill Baptist Church
- Jerusalem Church*

=== Cemeteries ===
- Olive Branch Baptist Church Cemetery
- Olive Branch Missionary Baptist Church Cemetery
- Pleasant Hill Cemetery
- Baucom Cemetery
- Edmond Lilly (E.L.) Davis Cemetery
