= Rays Fork (Richardson Creek tributary) =

Stream in North Carolina, USA

Rays Fork Tributary to Richardson Creek
- Location of Rays Fork mouth Rays Fork (Richardson Creek tributary) (the United States)

Location
- Country: United States
- State: North Carolina
- County: Union
- City: Wingate

Physical characteristics
- Source: Flag Branch divide
  - location: pond about 3 miles southeast of Rock Rest, North Carolina
  - coordinates: 34°55′20″N 080°28′11″W
  - elevation: 652 ft (199 m)
- Mouth: Richardson Creek
  - location: about 1 mile northeast of Monroe, North Carolina
  - coordinates: 35°00′14″N 080°28′32″W
  - elevation: 445 ft (136 m)
- Length: 7.83 mi (12.60 km)
- Basin size: 14.64 square miles (37.9 km^{2})
- Discharge
  - location: Richardson Creek
  - average: 17.59 cu ft/s (0.498 m^{3}/s) at mouth with Richardson Creek

Basin features
- Progression: Richardson Creek → Rocky River → Pee Dee River → Winyah Bay → Atlantic Ocean
- River system: Pee Dee
- Tributaries
  - left: Middle Fork Rays Fork; Flag Branch
  - right: unnamed tributaries
- Bridges: Old Pageland Monroe Road, Nash Road, White Store Road, Nash Road, Old Monroe Marshville Road, Witmore Road, Preston Road, US 74, Monroe Ansonville Road, US 74

Rays Fork is a 7.83 mi (12.60 km) long 3rd order tributary to Richardson Creek in Union County, North Carolina.

== Course ==
Rays Fork rises in a pond about 3 miles southeast of Rock Rest and then flows northeast and curves northwest to join Richardson Creek about 1 mile northeast of Monroe, North Carolina.

== Watershed ==
Rays Fork Creek drains 14.64 square miles (37.9 km^{2}) of area, receives about 48.6 in/year of precipitation, has a wetness index of 433.74, and is about 38% forested.
