= Crooked Creek (Rocky River tributary) =

Stream in North Carolina, USA

Crooked Creek Tributary to Rocky River
- Location of Crooked Creek mouth Crooked Creek (Rocky River tributary) (the United States)

Location
- Country: United States
- State: North Carolina
- County: Union

Physical characteristics
- Source: confluence of North Fork and South Fork of Crooked Creek
  - location: about 0.5 miles northwest of Bentons Crossroads, North Carolina
  - coordinates: 35°06′45″N 80°32′53″W
  - elevation: 562 ft (171 m)
- Mouth: Rocky River
  - location: about 7 miles northwest of New Salem, North Carolina
  - coordinates: 35°09′50″N 80°27′17″W
  - elevation: 416 ft (127 m)
- Length: 13.06 mi (21.02 km)
- Basin size: 50.24 square miles (130.1 km^{2})
- Discharge
  - location: Rocky River
  - average: 56.73 cu ft/s (1.606 m^{3}/s) at mouth with Rocky River

Basin features
- Progression: northeast
- River system: Pee Dee
- Tributaries
  - left: North Fork
  - right: South Fork; Grassy Branch
- Bridges: US 601, Unionville Brief Road, NC 218, Sikes Mill Road, E Brief Road

Crooked Creek is a 13.06 mi (21.02 km) long 3rd order tributary to the Rocky River in Union County, North Carolina.

== Course ==
Crooked Creek is formed at the confluence of North and South Forks of Crooked Creek about 0.5 miles northwest of Bentons Crossroads, North Carolina. Crooked Creek then flows northeast to join the Rocky River about 7 miles northwest of New Salem.

== Watershed ==
Crooked Creek drains 50.24 square miles (130.1 km^{2}) of area, receives about 47.9 in/year of precipitation, has a wetness index of 470.54, and is about 29% forested.
