= Cribs Creek =

Stream in North Carolina, USA

Cribs Creek Tributary to Rocky River
- Location of Cribs Creek mouth Cribs Creek (the United States)

Location
- Country: United States
- State: North Carolina
- County: Anson

Physical characteristics
- Source: Water Branch divide
  - location: pond about 0.5 miles southwest of Fountain Hill, North Carolina
  - coordinates: 35°03′33″N 80°17′32″W
  - elevation: 522 ft (159 m)
- Mouth: Rocky River
  - location: about 5 northeast of Burnsville (Anson County), North Carolina
  - coordinates: 35°09′21″N 80°12′25″W
  - elevation: 228 ft (69 m)
- Length: 4.72 mi (7.60 km)
- Basin size: 19.49 square miles (50.5 km^{2})
- Discharge
  - location: Rocky River
  - average: 22.06 cu ft/s (0.625 m^{3}/s) at mouth with Rocky River

Basin features
- Progression: Rocky River → Pee Dee River → Winyah Bay → Atlantic Ocean
- River system: Pee Dee
- Tributaries
  - left: Lockhart Branch; Big Branch
  - right: Little Cribs Creek
- Bridges: Thanny Helms Road, NC 218, New Home Church Road, Cappadocia Church Road, Pork Road, Sub Station Road, NC 742, Race Track Road, Line Road, Cribs Creek Road, Rocky River Church Road, Wightman Church Road

Cribs Creek is a 4.72 mi (7.60 km) long 2nd order tributary to the Rocky River in Anson County, North Carolina. This is the only stream of this name in the United States.

== Variant names ==
According to the Geographic Names Information System, it has also been known historically as:

- Cribbs Creek

== Course ==
Cribs Creek rises in a pond about 0.5 miles southwest of Fountain Hill, North Carolina and then flows northwest to join the Rocky River about 5 miles northeast of Burnsville.

== Watershed ==
Cribs Creek drains 19.49 square miles (50.5 km^{2}) of area, receives about 48.0 in/year of precipitation, has a wetness index of 400.15, and is about 55% forested.
