= Camp Branch (Rocky River tributary) =

Stream in North Carolina, US

Camp Branch Tributary to Rocky River
- Location of Camp Branch mouth Camp Branch (Rocky River tributary) (the United States)

Location
- Country: United States
- State: North Carolina
- County: Anson

Physical characteristics
- Source: divide between Camp Branch and Bowsaw Branch
  - location: about 0.5 miles northwest of Cedar Hill, North Carolina
  - coordinates: 35°09′10″N 080°05′13″W
  - elevation: 335 ft (102 m)
- Mouth: Rocky River
  - location: about 1.5 miles north of Cedar Hill, North Carolina
  - coordinates: 35°09′27″N 080°05′13″W
  - elevation: 197 ft (60 m)
- Length: 2.65 mi (4.26 km)
- Basin size: 2.75 square miles (7.1 km^{2})
- Discharge
  - location: Rocky River
  - average: 3.21 cu ft/s (0.091 m^{3}/s) at mouth with Rocky River

Basin features
- Progression: Rocky River → Pee Dee River → Winyah Bay → Atlantic Ocean
- River system: Pee Dee
- Tributaries
  - left: unnamed tributaries
  - right: unnamed tributaries
- Bridges: Old US 52, US 52, Carpenter Road

Camp Branch is a 2.65 mi (4.26 km) long 1st order tributary to the Rocky River, in Anson County, North Carolina, United States.

== Course ==
Camp Branch rises on the divide between Camp Branch and Bowsaw Branch about 0.5 miles northwest of Cedar Hill in Anson County, North Carolina. Camp Branch then flows east to meet Rocky River about 1.5 miles north of Cedar Hill.

== Watershed ==
Camp Branch drains 2.75 square miles (7.1 km^{2}) of area, receives about 47.8 in/year of precipitation, has a topographic wetness index of 418.40 and is about 48% forested.
