= Grassy Creek (Rocky River tributary) =

Stream in North Carolina, USA

Grassy Creek Tributary to Rocky River
- Location of Grassy Creek mouth Grassy Creek (Rocky River tributary) (the United States)

Location
- Country: United States
- State: North Carolina
- County: Union

Physical characteristics
- Source: Grassy Branch divide
  - location: pond about 1 mil northeast of Unionville, North Carolina
  - coordinates: 35°05′53″N 80°29′12″W
  - elevation: 612 ft (187 m)
- Mouth: Rocky River
  - location: about 3 miles northwest of New Salem, North Carolina
  - coordinates: 35°09′50″N 80°24′47″W
  - elevation: 358 ft (109 m)
- Length: 7.00 mi (11.27 km)
- Basin size: 8.33 square miles (21.6 km^{2})
- Discharge
  - location: Rocky River
  - average: 9.98 cu ft/s (0.283 m^{3}/s) at mouth with Rocky River

Basin features
- Progression: Rocky River → Pee Dee River → Winyah Bay → Atlantic Ocean
- River system: Pee Dee
- Tributaries
  - left: unnamed tributaries
  - right: unnamed tributaries
- Bridges: Haigler Baucom Road, Braswell Rushing Road, Love Mill Road, Zebulon Williams Road, Haigler Road, NC 218

Grassy Creek is a 7.00 mi (11.27 km) long 1st order tributary to the Rocky River in Union County, North Carolina.

== Course ==
Grassy Creek rises in a pond about 1 mile northeast of Unionville, North Carolina and then flows northeast to join the Rocky River about 3 miles northwest of New Salem.

== Watershed ==
Grassy Creek drains 8.33 square miles (21.6 km^{2}) of area, receives about 48.0 in/year of precipitation, has a wetness index of 425.52, and is about 36% forested.
