= Bearskin Creek (Richardson Creek tributary) =

Stream in North Carolina, USA

Bearskin Creek Tributary to Richardson Creek
- Location of Bearskin Creek mouth Bearskin Creek (Richardson Creek tributary) (the United States)

Location
- Country: United States
- State: North Carolina
- County: Union
- City: Monroe

Physical characteristics
- Source: Twelvemile Creek divide
  - location: southwest side of the Monroe Airport
  - coordinates: 35°00′09″N 080°37′43″W
  - elevation: 652 ft (199 m)
- Mouth: Richardson Creek
  - location: Monroe, North Carolina at Sutton Park
  - coordinates: 34°59′25″N 080°30′35″W
  - elevation: 457 ft (139 m)
- Length: 8.93 mi (14.37 km)
- Basin size: 15.22 square miles (39.4 km^{2})
- Discharge
  - location: Richardson Creek
  - average: 18.48 cu ft/s (0.523 m^{3}/s) at mouth with Richardson Creek

Basin features
- Progression: Richardson Creek → Rocky River → Pee Dee River → Winyah Bay → Atlantic Ocean
- River system: Pee Dee
- Tributaries
  - left: Dry Fork
  - right: Camp Branch
- Bridges: Sanford Lane, Price Shortcut Road, N Rocky River Road, N Martin Luther King Jr. Boulevard, Concord Avenue, Skyway Drive, Miller Street, Stafford Street, US 601, N Sutherland Avenue, Morgan Mill Road

Bearskin Creek is a 8.93 mi (14.37 km) long 3rd order tributary to Richardson Creek in Union County, North Carolina.

== Course ==
Bearskin Creek rises at the Monroe Airport and then flows east to join Richardson Creek in Monroe, North Carolina at Sutton Park.

== Watershed ==
Bearskin Creek drains 15.22 square miles (39.4 km^{2}) of area, receives about 48.5 in/year of precipitation, has a wetness index of 457.88, and is about 28% forested.
