= Camp Branch (West Fork Clear Creek tributary) =

Stream in Vernon County, Missouri, U.S.

Coordinates: 37.8314268°N 94.2196679°W

Camp Branch is a stream in Vernon County in the U.S. state of Missouri. It is a tributary of West Fork Clear Creek.

Camp Branch took its name from a Confederate encampment near its course.

== See also ==
- List of rivers of Missouri
