= Shades Mountain =

Mountain in Alabama, United States

- Location within Alabama

Highest point
- Elevation: 1,109 ft (338 m)
- Coordinates: 33°25′01″N 86°51′04″W

Geography
- Location: Jefferson County, Alabama, U.S.

Climbing
- Easiest route: Hike

Shades Mountain is a cuesta in Jefferson County, Alabama, United States. The mountain is bordered by Shades Crest Road to the west, Highway 150 to the south, Highway 280 to the east and Shades Creek to the north. It includes all of the neighborhood of Bluff Park in Hoover, where it summits, as well as portions of the cities of Homewood, Vestavia Hills and Mountain Brook.

== Geology ==
The rocks of Shades Mountain including the "Shades Sandstone" can be viewed readily from Moss Rock Preserve in Hoover, on the north side of Hurricane Creek.

== Landmarks ==
There is a Lovers Leap, a rock outcropping on Shades Crest Road and Brock Gap where Shades Mountain was blasted to make way for rail access. There is also the locally-known Tip Top Grill (closed) which has a view overlooking much of the area.
