= Watson Creek (Minnesota) =

- Location within Minnesota

Location
- Country: United States
- State: Minnesota
- County: Fillmore

Physical characteristics
- Source
  - coordinates: 43.6891309°N 92.2676656°W
- Mouth

Basin features
- River system: Root River (Minnesota)

Watson Creek is a stream in Fillmore County, in the U.S. state of Minnesota.

Watson Creek was named for Thomas and James Watson, pioneer settlers.

The Minnesota Department of Natural Resources has designated 16.9 miles of Watson Creek as a trout stream. It is populated with brook, brown, and rainbow trout.

== See also ==
- List of rivers of Minnesota
