= Camp Branch (Flat Creek tributary) =

Stream in the US state of Missouri

Coordinates: 38.6494615°N 93.2757622°W

Camp Branch is a stream in Pettis County in the U.S. state of Missouri. It is a tributary of Flat Creek.

Camp Branch was so named for the fact attendees of revivals camped on its banks.

== See also ==
- List of rivers of Missouri
