= Brock Gap =

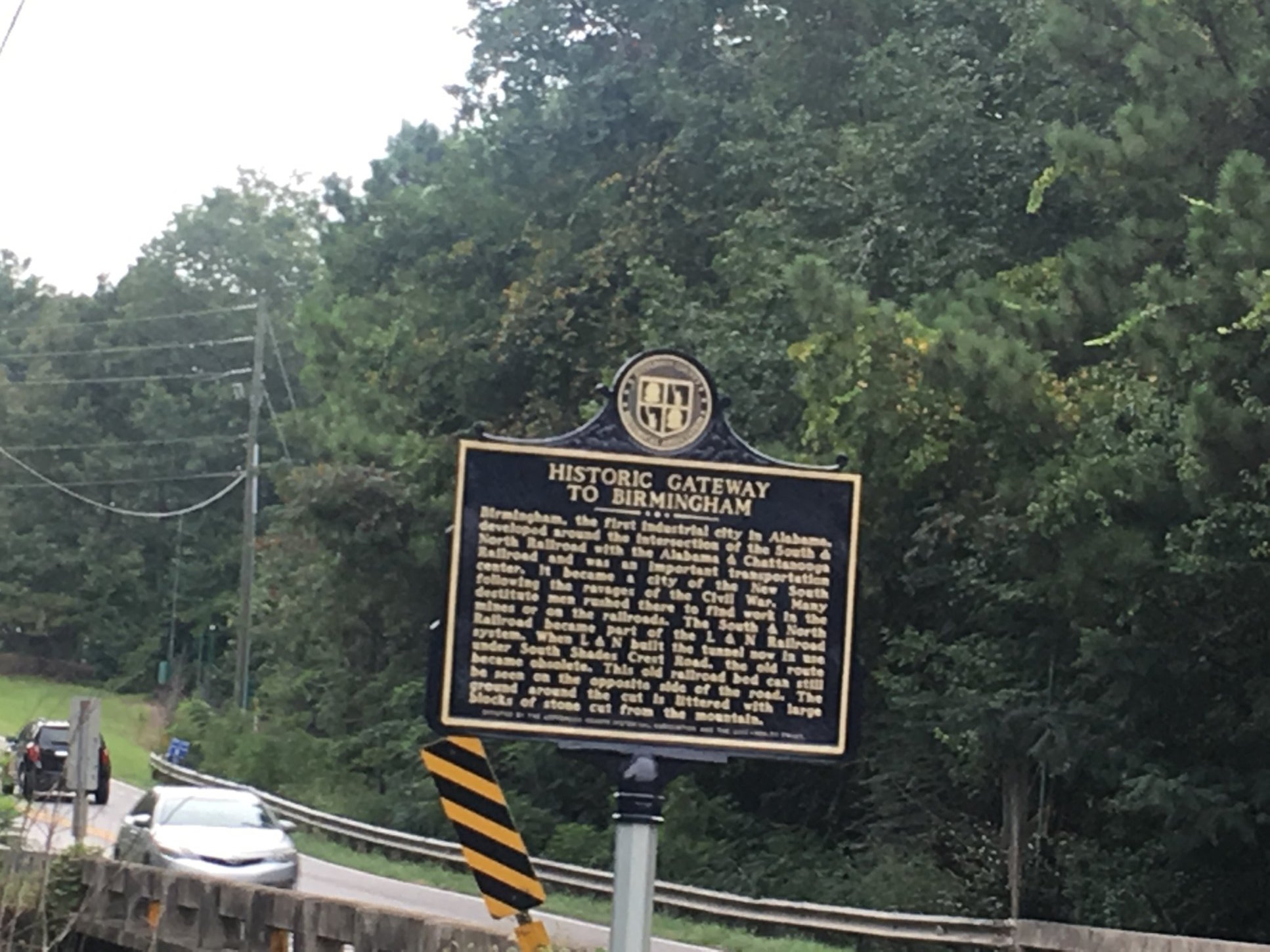
- Historic marker and commemorative plaque in Brock gap, Hoover, Birmingham, Alabama.
- Interactive map of Brock Gap
- Elevation: 518 feet (158 m)

Third Approach
- Location: Jefferson County, Alabama, U.S.
- Range: Cahaba Ridges
- Coordinates: 33°20′12″N 86°52′15″W
- Topo map: USGS Helena

Brock Gap (variant Brock's Gap) is a natural pass across Shades Mountain in Hoover, Alabama, most notable as being the location used by the South & North Railroad (S&N) to reach the Birmingham area in the late 19th century from the mineral deposits to the south, spurring economic development in the area.

== Geographic description ==
Brock Gap is located at an elevation of 518 feet (158 meters) above mean sea level. The surrounding Shades Mountain is over 700 feet in elevation.

== Historical rail use ==
In 1858, the state of Alabama tasked John Milner to survey a route across Shades Mountain for the S&N Railroad. The S&N was intended to connect the mineral resources south of Shades Mountain (coal, limestone, and iron ore) with the developing industries in the area of Jones Valley that would become Birmingham around the junction of the S&N Railroad and the Alabama and Chattanooga Railroad. Brock Gap was selected and the rail line north was constructed between 1858 and 1871, interrupted by the Civil War. At Brock Gap, workers used nitroglycerin to blast a cut 75 feet deep through limestone bedrock.

== Current rail use ==
Today, the 19th century cut is actively used by the CSX Lineville Subdivision, made up of part of the former Atlanta, Birmingham and Atlantic Railway, in its route from Birmingham to Atlanta, Georgia and Florida via Manchester, Georgia. The direct successor of the S&N Railroad, the CSX S&NA South Subdivision, is carried through a more recently constructed tunnel slightly east of the 19th century cut.
