= Little Richardson Creek =

Stream in North Carolina, USA

Little Richardson Creek Tributary to Richardson Creek
- Location of Little Richardson Creek mouth Little Richardson Creek (the United States)

Location
- Country: United States
- State: North Carolina
- County: Union
- City: Monroe

Physical characteristics
- Source: Buffalo Creek divide
  - location: about 1 mile southeast of Alton, North Carolina
  - coordinates: 34°52′43″N 080°31′18″W
  - elevation: 648 ft (198 m)
- Mouth: Richardson Creek
  - location: Lake Lee southeast of Monroe, North Carolina
  - coordinates: 34°57′46″N 080°30′44″W
  - elevation: 490 ft (150 m)
- Length: 6.39 mi (10.28 km)
- Basin size: 16.46 square miles (42.6 km^{2})
- Discharge
  - location: Richardson Creek
  - average: 19.52 cu ft/s (0.553 m^{3}/s) at mouth with Richardson Creek

Basin features
- Progression: Richardson Creek → Rocky River → Pee Dee River → Winyah Bay → Atlantic Ocean
- River system: Pee Dee
- Tributaries
  - left: unnamed tributaries
  - right: Buck Branch
- Waterbodies: Lake Monroe; Lake Lee
- Bridges: Bruce Thomas Road, E Sandy Ridge Road (x2), Stack Road, Macedonia Church Road, Medlin Road

Little Richardson Creek is a 6.39 mi (10.28 km) long 3rd order tributary to Richardson Creek in Union County, North Carolina.

== Course ==
Little Richardson Creek rises about 1 mile southeast of Alton, North Carolina and then flows north to join Richardson Creek in Lake Lee southeast of Monroe, North Carolina.

== Watershed ==
Little Richardson Creek drains 16.46 square miles (42.6 km^{2}) of area, receives about 48.6 in/year of precipitation, has a wetness index of 447.78, and is about 41% forested.
