= Watson Creek (Richardson Creek tributary) =

Stream in North Carolina, USA

Watson Creek Tributary to Richardson Creek
- Location of Watson Creek mouth Watson Creek (Richardson Creek tributary) (the United States)

Location
- Country: United States
- State: North Carolina
- County: Union

Physical characteristics
- Source: Grassy Creek divide
  - location: pond about 5 miles north of Watson, North Carolina
  - coordinates: 35°06′31″N 080°26′54″W
  - elevation: 563 ft (172 m)
- Mouth: Richardson Creek
  - location: about 1 mile southeast of Watson, North Carolina
  - coordinates: 35°04′11″N 080°25′09″W
  - elevation: 398 ft (121 m)
- Length: 4.29 mi (6.90 km)
- Basin size: 6.39 square miles (16.6 km^{2})
- Discharge
  - location: Richardson Creek
  - average: 7.79 cu ft/s (0.221 m^{3}/s) at mouth with Richardson Creek

Basin features
- Progression: Richardson Creek → Rocky River → Pee Dee River → Winyah Bay → Atlantic Ocean
- River system: Pee Dee
- Tributaries
  - left: Haw Branch
  - right: unnamed tributaries
- Bridges: Baucom Manor Road, Watson Church Road, Carl Polk Road, Watson Church Road, New Salem Road

Watson Creek is a 4.29 mi (6.90 km) long 1st order tributary to Richardson Creek in Union County, North Carolina.

== Course ==
Watson Creek rises in a pond about 5 miles north of Watson, North Carolina and then flows south to join Richardson Creek about 1 mile southeast of Watson.

== Watershed ==
Watson Creek drains 6.39 square miles (16.6 km^{2}) of area, receives about 48.1 in/year of precipitation, has a wetness index of 429.44, and is about 32% forested.
