= Richardson Creek (Rocky River tributary) =

Stream in North Carolina, USA

Richardson Creek Tributary to Rocky River
- Location of Richardson Creek mouth

Location
- Country: United States
- State: North Carolina
- Counties: Anson; Union
- City: Monroe

Physical characteristics
- Source: divide between Richardson Creek and Lynches River
  - location: Pond, about 1 mile southeast of Roughedge, North Carolina
  - coordinates: 34°52′36″N 080°35′46″W
  - elevation: 660 ft (200 m)
- Mouth: Rocky River
  - location: about 3 miles southwest of Cottonville, North Carolina
  - coordinates: 35°09′24″N 080°13′32″W
  - elevation: 230 ft (70 m)
- Length: 44.01 mi (70.83 km)
- Basin size: 234.15 square miles (606.4 km^{2})
- Discharge
  - location: Rocky River
  - average: 249.47 cu ft/s (7.064 m^{3}/s) at mouth with Rocky River

Basin features
- Progression: Rocky River → Pee Dee River → Winyah Bay → Atlantic Ocean
- River system: Pee Dee River
- Tributaries
  - left: Beaverdam Creek; Bearskin Creek; Stewarts Creek; Mill Creek; Watson Creek; Gold Branch; Stegall Branch
  - right: Adams Branch; Little Richardson Creek; Joes Branch; Rays Fork; Meadow Branch; Bull Branch; Salem Creek; Gourdvine Creek; Water Branch; Pine Log Creek
- Waterbodies: Lake Lee
- Bridges: Lathan Road, Griffith Road, Plyler Mill Road, Griffith Road, Sara Lane, Wolf Pond Road, Medlin Road, US 601, US 74, Walkup Avenue, US 74, Olive Branch Road, Austin Chaney Road, E Lawyers Road, Tarlton Mill Road, NC 205, NC 218, Pleasant Hill Church Road, Blonnie Ross Road, NC 742, George Wright Road, Rocky Mount Church Road,

Richardson Creek is a tributary of the Rocky River in south-central North Carolina that rises in Union County near Monroe and then flows northeast through Anson County to the Rocky River.

== Variant names ==
According to the Geographic Names Information System, it has also been known historically as:

- Richardsons Creek

== See also ==
- List of North Carolina rivers
