= Mint Hill, North Carolina =

- Town
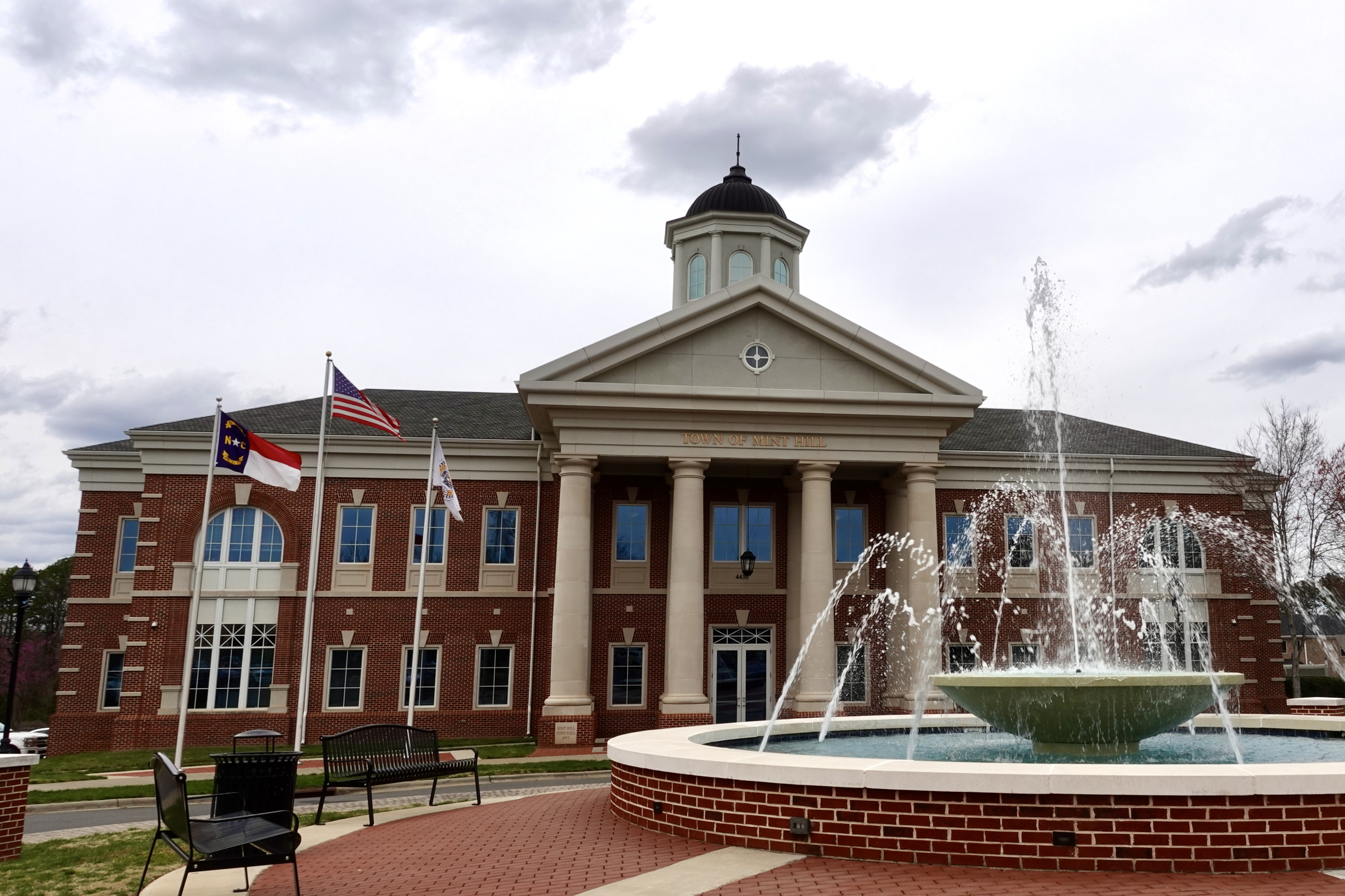
- Mint Hill City Hall and fountain

- Location in Mecklenburg County and the state of North Carolina
- Coordinates: 35°10′42″N 80°39′10″W
- Country: United States
- State: North Carolina
- Counties: Mecklenburg, Union
- Founded: 1750
- Incorporated: 1899, 1971

Area
  - Total: 24.81 sq mi (64.3 km^{2})
  - Land: 24.59 sq mi (63.7 km^{2})
  - Water: 0.23 sq mi (0.60 km^{2})
- Elevation: 768 ft (234 m)

Population (2020)
  - Total: 26,450
  - Density: 1,075.8/sq mi (415.4/km^{2})
- Time zone: UTC−5 (EST)
  - Summer (DST): UTC−4 (EDT)
- ZIP Codes: 28227 (Mint Hill); 28105 (Matthews)
- Area codes: 704, 980
- FIPS code: 37-43480
- GNIS feature ID: 2406170
- Website: www.minthill.com

Mint Hill is a suburban town in southeastern Mecklenburg and northwestern Union counties in the U.S. state of North Carolina. It is a major suburb on the outskirts of Charlotte and near the Cabarrus County line. The population was 26,450 at the 2020 census, up from 22,722 in 2010.

== History ==
Mint Hill was founded around 1750 by Scottish-Irish pioneers. It was the first town created in Mecklenburg County.

It is not known exactly when Mint Hill received its first charter, but in 1910, town officials gave up the charter so that Mecklenburg County would build a road through Mint Hill. Between 1910 and 1971, Mint Hill ran on its own without elected town officials.

In 1971, Mint Hill decided to become incorporated again.

== Geography ==
Mint Hill is in southeastern Mecklenburg County, with a small portion extending southeast into Union County. It is bordered to the northwest by the city of Charlotte, with Uptown Charlotte, the city center, 11 miles (18 km) west of the center of Mint Hill. The town of Matthews borders Mint Hill to the southwest, and Stallings in Union County is to the south.

Interstate 485, the Charlotte Outerbelt, passes through the east side of Mint Hill, with access from five exits. North Carolina Highway 51 passes through the center of Mint Hill, while NC Highways 24 and North Carolina Highway 27 run concurrently along the northern border of the town, leading west into Charlotte and east to Midland. North Carolina Highway 218 has its western terminus in the center of Mint Hill and runs southeast into Fairview.

According to the U.S. Census Bureau, the town of Mint Hill has a total area of 24.8 square miles (64 km^{2}), of which 0.2 square miles (0.5 km^{2}), or 0.91%, are water. The center of town sits on a ridge which drains west toward McAlpine Creek, part of the Catawba River watershed, and east toward Clear Creek, Crooked Creek, and Goose Creek, part of the Rocky River watershed leading to the Pee Dee River.

== Demographics ==
Historical population
Census	Pop.	Note	%±
1900	192		—
1910	194		1.0%
1980	7,915		—
1990	11,567		46.1%
2000	14,922		29.0%
2010	22,722		52.3%
2020	26,450		16.4%
2025 (est.)	29,476	▲	11.4%
U.S. Decennial Census

=== 2020 census ===
As of the 2020 census, Mint Hill had a population of 26,450. There were 9,824 households and 7,386 families residing in the town.

The median age was 43.9 years. 21.6% of residents were under the age of 18 and 19.5% of residents were 65 years of age or older. For every 100 females there were 94.8 males, and for every 100 females age 18 and over there were 91.6 males age 18 and over.

98.3% of residents lived in urban areas, while 1.7% lived in rural areas.

Of all households, 31.9% had children under the age of 18 living in them, 62.2% were married-couple households, 11.9% were households with a male householder and no spouse or partner present, and 21.5% were households with a female householder and no spouse or partner present. About 19.5% of all households were made up of individuals, and 9.4% had someone living alone who was 65 years of age or older.

There were 10,302 housing units, of which 4.6% were vacant. The homeowner vacancy rate was 0.9% and the rental vacancy rate was 9.2%.

Mint Hill racial composition
Race	Number	Percentage
White (non-Hispanic)	17,068	64.53%
Black or African American (non-Hispanic)	4,101	15.5%
Native American	91	0.34%
Asian	1,035	3.91%
Pacific Islander	10	0.04%
Other/mixed	1,219	4.61%
Hispanic or Latino	2,926	11.06%

=== 2000 census ===
At the 2000 census there were 14,922 people, 5,581 households, and 4,431 families living in the town. The population density was 702.9 people per square mile (271.4 people/km^{2}). There were 5,763 housing units at an average density of 271.5 per square mile (104.8/km^{2}). The racial makeup of the town was 78.42% White, 12.34% African American, 0.61% Native American, 2.53% Asian, 0.03% Pacific Islander, 4.08% from other races, and 1.99% from two or more races. Hispanic or Latino people of any race were 8.29%.

Of the 5,581 households 33.9% had children under the age of 18 living with them, 68.9% were married couples living together, 7.4% had a female householder with no husband present, and 20.6% were non-families. 16.4% of households were one person and 5.2% were one person aged 65 or older. The average household size was 2.67 and the average family size was 2.98.

The age distribution was 24.3% under the age of 18, 7.1% from 18 to 24, 28.5% from 25 to 44, 29.8% from 45 to 64, and 10.3% 65 or older. The median age was 39 years. For every 100 females, there were 98.1 males. For every 100 females age 18 and over, there were 95.8 males.

The median household income was $60,822 and the median family income was $67,055. Males had a median income of $45,368 versus $30,467 for females. The per capita income for the town was $26,487. About 2.9% of families and 4.8% of the population were below the poverty line, including 4.9% of those under age 18 and 11.4% of those age 65 or over.

== Schools and libraries ==
The children of Mint Hill within Mecklenburg County attend Charlotte-Mecklenburg Schools.

Elementary schools in the Mint Hill city limits in Mecklenburg County include Bain, Lebanon Road, and Mint Hill. Clear Creek Elementary is across from the Mint Hill city limits and serves a section of Mint Hill. Another section of Mint Hill is zoned to J. H. Gunn Elementary School.

Middle schools serving Mint Hill in Mecklenburg County include Northeast Middle and Mint Hill Middle, both in Mint Hill, as well as Albermarle Road Middle School, outside of Mint Hill. High school students in Mecklenburg County attend either Independence High School in Mint Hill, Rocky River High School in Mint Hill, or David W. Butler High School in Matthews.

The portion in Union County is in the Union County Public Schools school district.

Charter schools Queen's Grant Community School and Queen's Grant High School are also located in the town.

Mint Hill is served by a branch of the Charlotte Mecklenburg Library.
