= Unionville, North Carolina =

- Town
- Seal

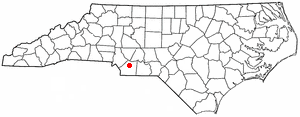
- Location of Unionville, North Carolina
- Coordinates: 35°04′18″N 80°31′02″W
- Country: United States
- State: North Carolina
- County: Union
- Incorporated: 1911, 1998

Government
  - Mayor: Randy Baucom

Area
  - Total: 29.41 sq mi (76.16 km^{2})
  - Land: 29.22 sq mi (75.67 km^{2})
  - Water: 0.19 sq mi (0.49 km^{2})
- Elevation: 584 ft (178 m)

Population (2020)
  - Total: 6,643
  - Density: 227.4/sq mi (87.79/km^{2})
- Time zone: UTC-5 (Eastern (EST))
  - Summer (DST): UTC-4 (EDT)
- FIPS code: 37-69260
- GNIS feature ID: 2406780
- Website: https://www.unionvillenc.org/

Unionville is a rural town in Union County, North Carolina, United States. The population was 6,643 at the 2020 census.

== Geography ==
According to the United States Census Bureau, the town has a total area of 26.2 square miles (68 km^{2}), of which 26.2 square miles (68 km^{2}) is land and 0.04 square miles (0.10 km^{2}) (0.11%) is water. It is situated in the foothills of the Uwharrie Mountains.

== Demographics ==
Historical population
Census	Pop.	Note	%±
1920	135		—
1930	140		3.7%
1940	144		2.9%
1950	124		−13.9%
1960	119		−4.0%
2000	4,797		—
2010	5,929		23.6%
2020	6,643		12.0%
2025 (est.)	7,322	▲	10.2%
U.S. Decennial Census

=== 2020 census ===
As of the 2020 census, Unionville had a population of 6,643 and 2,094 families residing in the town. The median age was 42.2 years. 23.2% of residents were under the age of 18 and 16.4% of residents were 65 years of age or older. For every 100 females there were 103.7 males, and for every 100 females age 18 and over there were 98.8 males age 18 and over.

0.6% of residents lived in urban areas, while 99.4% lived in rural areas.

There were 2,381 households in Unionville, of which 35.6% had children under the age of 18 living in them. Of all households, 66.4% were married-couple households, 13.0% were households with a male householder and no spouse or partner present, and 16.6% were households with a female householder and no spouse or partner present. About 15.6% of all households were made up of individuals and 7.3% had someone living alone who was 65 years of age or older.

There were 2,508 housing units, of which 5.1% were vacant. The homeowner vacancy rate was 1.1% and the rental vacancy rate was 4.1%.

Unionville racial composition
Race	Number	Percentage
White (non-Hispanic)	5,923	89.16%
Black or African American (non-Hispanic)	137	2.06%
Native American	12	0.18%
Asian	56	0.84%
Pacific Islander	8	0.12%
Other/Mixed	203	3.06%
Hispanic or Latino	304	4.58%

=== 2000 census ===
At the 2000 census, there were 4,797 people in 1,670 households, including 1,382 families, in the town. The population density was 183.1 inhabitants per square mile (70.7/km^{2}). There were 1,717 housing units at an average density of 65.5 per square mile (25.3/km^{2}). The racial makeup of the town was 96.48% White, 2.23% African American, 0.19% Native American, 0.33% Asian, 0.48% from other races, and 0.29% from two or more races. Hispanic or Latino of any race were 1.71%.

Of the 1,670 households, 44.3% had children under the age of 18 living with them, 72.4% were married couples living together, 6.8% had a female householder with no husband present, and 17.2% were non-families. A total of 14.4% of households were one person and 5.3% were one person aged 65 or older. The average household size was 2.85 and the average family size was 3.15.

The age distribution was 29.0% under the age of 18, 6.6% from 18 to 24, 34.8% from 25 to 44, 20.9% from 45 to 64, and 8.8% 65 or older. The median age was 35 years. For every 100 females, there were 97.3 males. For every 100 females age 18 and over, there were 96.2 males.

The median household income was $57,478 and the median family income was $62,736. Males had a median income of $40,145 versus $28,889 for females. The per capita income for the town was $20,266. About 3.0% of families and 5.3% of the population were below the poverty line, including 5.6% of those under age 18 and 15.6% of those age 65 or over.

== Education ==
The Unionville community has a rich educational history dating to the nineteenth century with the founding of the Union Institute in 1886. Currently, Unionville houses Piedmont High School, Piedmont Middle School, Unionville Elementary School, Porter Ridge Elementary School, Porter Ridge Middle School, Porter Ridge High School.

== History ==
The town of Unionville was originally chartered by the North Carolina General Assembly in 1911. Town officials met in the Union Institute building until the building was destroyed by fire. Local leaders, working with the general assembly succeeded in reactivating the town's charter in 1998.

Union County was formed in 1842 from parts of Anson County and Mecklenburg County. The town of Unionville was created in the Goose Creek community on the former Mecklenburg / Anson county line which ran north to south along what is now Unionville Road.

=== Union Institute ===
Founded in 1886 by Professor Oliver C. Hamilton, the Union Institute was organized to serve the educational needs of the community. In 1885, local residents provided materials and labor for the construction of the school which served students of all ages from Union County as well as upstate South Carolina. Professor Hamilton left the school in 1898, but returned to the institute serving as head instructor in 1904. Originally constructed as a private school, the Union Institute was turned over to the county board of education in 1910. The two story structure was constructed next to the site of the current Unionville Community Center. In January 1917, a fire destroyed the building in its entirety. Students escaping from the building saved the school bell from the second story porch. The original Union Institute bell has served each successive Unionville School since; and today is displayed from the main entrance to Unionville Elementary School.

=== Town Hall ===
Unionville Town Hall is located at the intersection of Unionville Road and Unionville-Indian Trail Rd. Town Hall was originally constructed as the fellowship for the Unionville Presbyterian Church which was constructed in 1915. The sanctuary of the Unionville Presbyterian Church was destroyed by fire in July,1994. After meeting for the next five years in the former fellowship hall, the congregation of Unionville Presbyterian Church dedicated the building and grounds to the town of Unionville for municipal use. The first town meeting held in the current town hall occurred on February 17, 2000.

== Government ==
The Town of Unionville operates under the Mayor-Council form of government as provided by part 3 of Article 7 of Chapter 160A of North Carolina general statutes. Established in 1911, the original town charter provided for a Mayor, five Commissioners as well as a secretary, treasurer, and town Constable. In 1911, the town's first Mayor was J.B. Little. Commissioners were C.D. Benton, T.L.A. Helms, J.T. Price, A.A. Secrest and Dr. A.D.N. Whitley.

After a fire destroyed many town records in 1917, town officials ceased meeting; resulting in a loss of the town's charter.

In 1998, a majority of voters cast votes to revive the charter of the town.

Currently, the Mayor and Commissioners are elected to serve four year terms.

== Public Safety ==
Law enforcement in the town of Unionville is provided by the Union County Sheriff's Office as well as the North Carolina State Highway Patrol.

Fire protection is provided by the Town of Unionville Volunteer Fire Department, an ISO class 3 rated fire department. The Unionville Fire Department is a combination paid / volunteer department which operates out of two stations; Station 21 (located at 4919 Unionville Road, Monroe, NC 28110) and Station 22 (located at 3229 Concord HWY, Monroe, NC 28110).

Advanced Life Support level Emergency Medical Services (EMS) in the town is provided by Union Emergency Medical Services, and augmented by first responder / EMT support from the Unionville Fire Department.

== Community Involvement ==
Unionville is widely known for its community spirit. For over 70 years, the annual Unionville Barbeque, held at Unionville Elementary school, has served as one of the largest fundraisers for a school in the state of North Carolina. Other community events held annually include an annual July 4 parade, Christmas parade and tree lighting ceremony, and community concerts (Concerts in the Park) held on the grounds of the community center.

=== Unionville Lion's Club ===
Since becoming chartered in December 1970, the Unionville Lion's club has remained active in the community as well as town events.

=== Sam F. Keziah American Legion post. ===
Unionville is served by the Sam F. Keziah American Legion Post; Post 535.
