= New Salem, North Carolina =

New Salem
- Unincorporated community
- Location within the state of North Carolina
- Coordinates: 35°07′52″N 80°22′09″W
- Country: United States
- State: North Carolina
- County: Union
- Elevation: 538 ft (164 m)
- Time zone: UTC-5 (Eastern (EST))
  - Summer (DST): UTC-4 (EDT)
- ZIP code: 28103
- Area codes: 704, 980
- GNIS feature ID: 1021637

New Salem is an unincorporated community in Union County, North Carolina, United States. It is located northeast of Monroe, at the intersection of NC 205 and NC 218. New Salem is the home of Polk Mountain, which is the southernmost high peak of the Uwharrie Mountains at 861 feet (262 m) at its peak.
