= Rocky River (North Carolina) =

Stream in North Carolina, USA

Rocky River Tributary to Pee Dee River
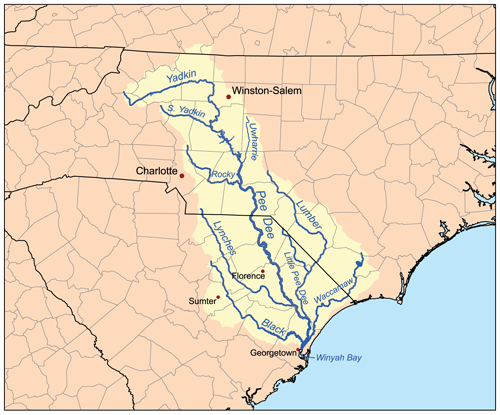
- Map of the Pee Dee River watershed showing the Rocky River

- Location of Rocky River mouth

Location
- Country: United States
- State: North Carolina
- County: Anson; Cabarrus; Iredell; Mecklenburg; Richmond; Stanly; Union

Physical characteristics
- Source: divide between Rocky River and Catawba River
  - location: Mooresville, North Carolina
  - coordinates: 35°35′02″N 80°47′54″W
  - elevation: 885 ft (270 m)
- Mouth: Pee Dee River
  - location: about 3 miles northeast of Ansonville, North Carolina
  - coordinates: 35°08′36″N 080°04′35″W
  - elevation: 190 ft (58 m)
- Length: 94.16 mi (151.54 km)
- Basin size: 1,471.3 sq mi (3,811 km^{2})
- Discharge
  - location: Pee Dee River
  - average: 1,526.06 cu ft/s (43.213 m^{3}/s) at mouth with Pee Dee River

Basin features
- Progression: Pee Dee River → Winyah Bay → Atlantic Ocean
- River system: Pee Dee River
- Tributaries
  - left: Coddle Creek; Irish Buffalo Creek; Hamby Branch; Dutch Buffalo Creek; Little Meadow Creek; Meadow Creek; Camp Branch; Pumpkin Creek; Rock Hole Creek; Island Creek; Coldwater Branch; Gilberts Creek; Big Bear Creek; Murray Branch; Stillhouse Branch; Spears Branch; Coopers Creek; Jacks Branch; Hardy Creek; Big Cedar Creek; Little Cedar Creek
  - right: Dye Creek; West Branch; Clarke Creek; Mallard Creek; Back Creek; Reedy Creek; Bost Creek; Anderson Creek; Muddy Creek; Clear Creek; Goose Creek; Crooked Creek; Grassy Creek; Reason Branch; Crisco Branch; Cedar Branch; Richardson Creek; Cribs Creek; Lanes Creek; Little Creek; Bowsaw Branch; Camp Branch

The Rocky River is a 95-mile-long (153 km) river in the Piedmont region of North Carolina. It begins in Iredell County near Mooresville and flows south into Cabarrus County, where it is the principal waterway in the county. The river continues southeastward to form the line between Stanly, Union, and Anson counties. It empties into the Pee Dee River just below Norwood, North Carolina at the junction of Stanly, Montgomery, Anson, and Richmond counties, at the foot of the Uwharrie Mountains.

== Tourism ==
Efforts are being made to boost tourism, including canoe and kayak recreation, along Rocky River "Blueway" as part of the Carolina Thread Trail. Private, non-profit organizations have developed park lands for improved river access.

== Natural history and ecology ==
The Rocky River watershed has been the source of many ecological and environmental studies in recent history.

Certain hydrological research has found that urbanization, particularly in metro-Charlotte communities, altered the runoff patterns and streamflow dynamics of the river. The study also predicts a high likelihood of increased streamflow through 2030. Some hydroelectrical planners in Union County plan to use the Rocky River to supply the county with both fresh water and electricity, something the county has been missing due to the lack of a true water source.

Rocky River is also a victim of historical gold mining runoff in Gold Hill. Such the case that some recent tests of channel and floodplain deposits suggest that there is remaining and longstanding mercury contamination from the 19th-century.

Ecological surveys of the watershed and its surrounding bases have identified new historical and entomological information. Pteridinium fossils were found in Stanly County in 2025 and examined to determine different and unique morphologies that would reflect on the historical, biological form of the species. A separate survey was done of the river to fill missing records in the North Carolina State University entomological collection. Seven new black bug species (Thyreocoridae) were identified, one of which was found next to Rocky River.
