= Winyah Bay =

Estuary in Georgetown County, South Carolina, U.S.

Coordinates: 33.2912°N 79.2756°W

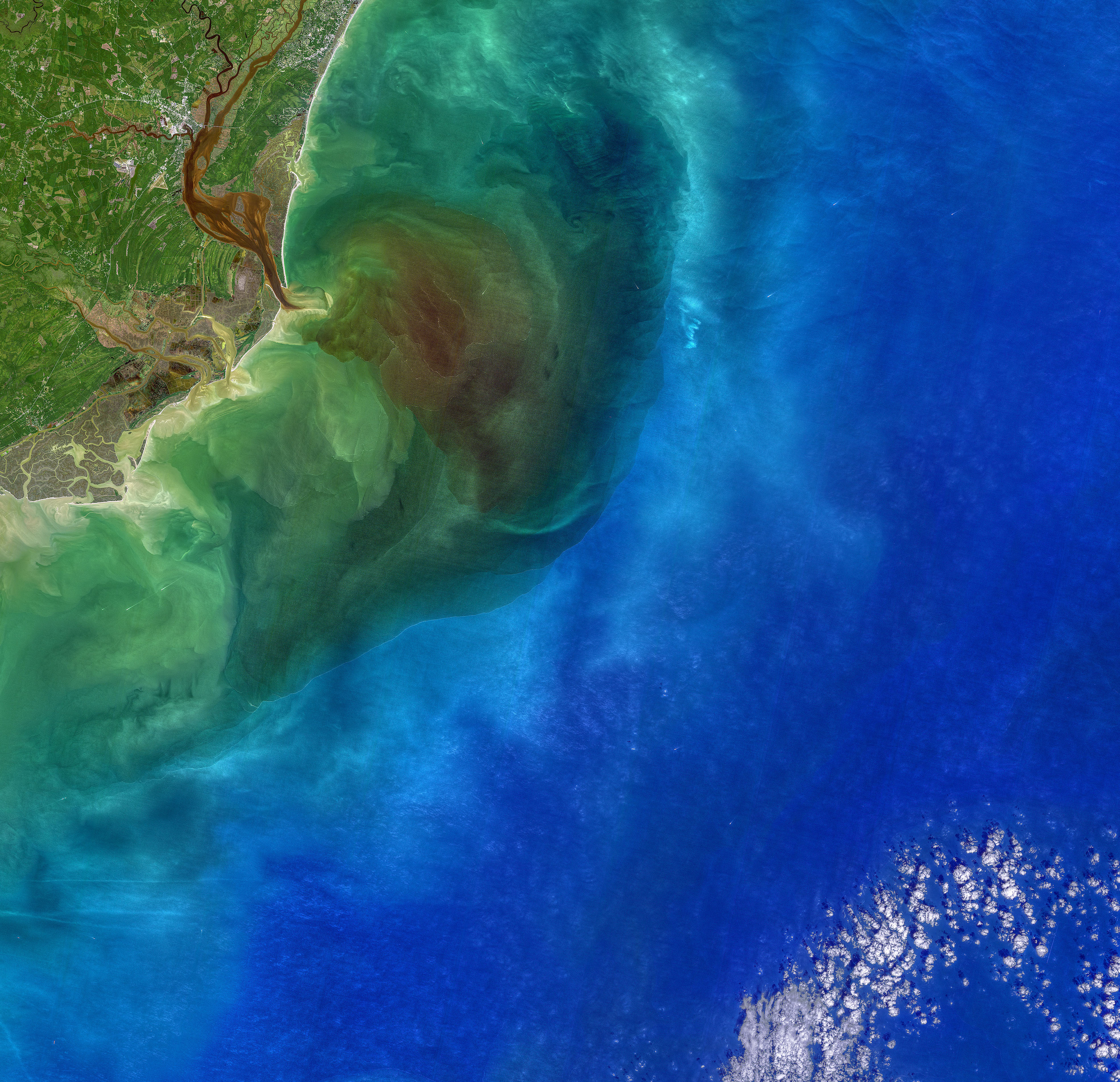
Satellite image of Winyah Bay

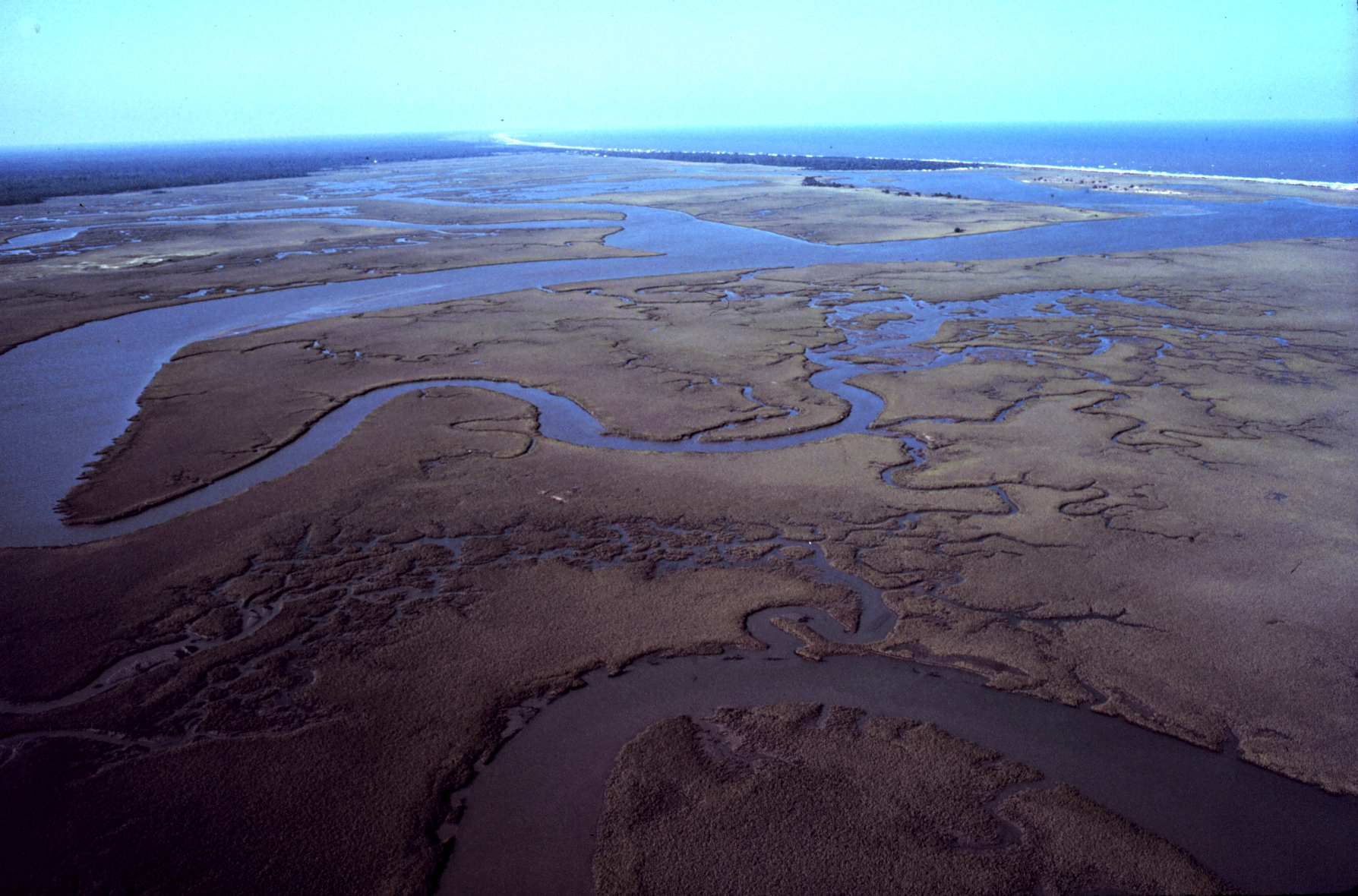
Aerial view of north inlet of Winyah Bay National Estuarine Research Reserve in 2010

Winyah Bay is a coastal estuary that is the confluence of the Waccamaw River, the Pee Dee River, the Black River, and the Sampit River in Georgetown County, in eastern South Carolina. Its name comes from the Winyah people, who inhabited the region during the eighteenth century. The historic port city of Georgetown is located on the bay, and the bay generally serves as the terminating point for the Grand Strand.

The bay is evidence of a drowned coastline, created by a rise in sea level in recent geologic time. It was a prime site for fishing by generations of Native American cultures. This area was developed by English colonists as a seaport and center of rice culture and timbering.

The entrance to the bay is flanked by North Island, South Island and Cat Island. Today, the first two islands and most of the third comprise the Tom Yawkey Wildlife Center, as the islands were willed to the South Carolina Department of Natural Resources by Tom Yawkey, former owner of the Boston Red Sox.

Winyah Bay is the fourth-largest estuary on the US East Coast, when classified by discharge rate. It is home to many aquatic and terrestrial species, including sturgeon, sharks, dolphins, red drum, stingrays, star drum, white shrimp, blue crabs, pelicans, bald eagles, cormorants, and various species of seagulls.

== History ==
The first European contact with Winyah Bay was June 24, 1521, when two ships commanded by Pedro de Quexós and Francisco Gordillo arrived. The original name for Winyah Bay given by the Spaniards was San Juan Bautista, as they arrived on St. John the Baptist's Day. The local indigenous tribes called the area chicora or some close equivalent to this word. The Spaniards traded with the Native Americans for a month and explored north and south of the bay. They then enslaved 70 Native Americans and took them back to Santo Domingo. One of these, Francisco de Chicora, went to Spain and was interviewed at length by court historian Peter Martyr who published detailed reports. De Quejo returned to Winyah Bay in 1525 and explored from Amelia Island, Florida to Chesapeake Bay, Maryland. His findings and place names were published on a 1526 map by Juan Vespucci.

The first African slaves in what would become the present day United States of America arrived August 9, 1526, in Winyah Bay, when Lucas Vázquez de Ayllón brought 600 colonists to start a colony. Records say the colonists included enslaved Africans, without saying how many. This arrival was almost 100 years before the first enslaved Africans arrived in Virginia in 1619. Francisco de Chicora returned as a translator with this group and escaped back to his family. After a month Ayllón moved the colony to what is now Georgia, where it failed in a few months, the enslaved Africans escaped to live with the local Native Americans, and the 100 other survivors returned to Santo Domingo.

== See also ==
- North Inlet-Winyah Bay National Estuarine Research Reserve
- Waterways forming and crossings of the Atlantic Intracoastal Waterway
