= Marshville Township, Union County, North Carolina =

Coordinates: 34.99086°N 80.36806°W

- Township
- Location of Marshville Township in Union County

- Location of Union County in North Carolina
- Country: United States
- State: North Carolina
- County: Union

Area
  - Total: 77.80 sq mi (201.49 km^{2})
- Highest elevation (southwest end of township): 634 ft (193 m)
- Lowest elevation (Floodplain of Lanes Creek of east side of township): 382 ft (116 m)

Population (2010)
  - Total: 8,523
  - Density: 109.55/sq mi (42.30/km^{2})
- Time zone: UTC-4 (EST)
  - Summer (DST): UTC-5 (EDT)
- Area code: 704

Marshville Township, population 8,523, is one of nine townships in Union County, North Carolina. Marshville Township is 77.80 square miles (201.5 km^{2}) in size and is located in eastern Union County. This township contains the towns of Wingate (east parts of) and Marshville within its borders.

== Geography ==
The east part of the township is drained by Lanes Creek and its tributaries; Maness Branch, Lacey Branch, Wide Mouth Branch, Lick Branch, Beaverdam Creek, Barkers Branch, Cedar Branch, Cool Spring Branch, and Norkett Branch. The northwestern and northern part of the township is drained by Richardson Creek and its tributaries; Bull Branch, Meadow Branch, and Salem Creek.
