= Lanes Creek Township, Union County, North Carolina =

Coordinates: 34.85619°N 80.37776°W

- Township
- Location of Lanes Creek Township in Union County

- Location of Union County in North Carolina
- Country: United States
- State: North Carolina
- County: Union

Area
  - Total: 49.57 sq mi (128.38 km^{2})
- Highest elevation (southwest end of township): 630 ft (190 m)
- Lowest elevation (Floodplain of Brown Creek of east side of township): 324 ft (99 m)

Population (2010)
  - Total: 2,650
  - Density: 57.01/sq mi (22.01/km^{2})
- Time zone: UTC-4 (EST)
  - Summer (DST): UTC-5 (EDT)
- Area code: 704

Lanes Creek Township, population 2,650, is one of nine townships in Union County, North Carolina. Lanes Creek Township is 46.48 square miles (120.4 km^{2}) in size and is located in southeast Union County. This township does not have any towns or cities within it.

== Geography ==
The northern and western parts of the township are drained by Lanes Creek and its tributaries, Waxhaw Branch, Carolina Creek, Wicker Branch and Norkett Branch. The southeast side is drained by Brown Creek and its tributary, Little Brown Creek. The northwestern side is drained by Rone Branch.
