= Eldorado Township, Montgomery County, North Carolina =

Coordinates: 35.45946°N 80.06499°W

- Township
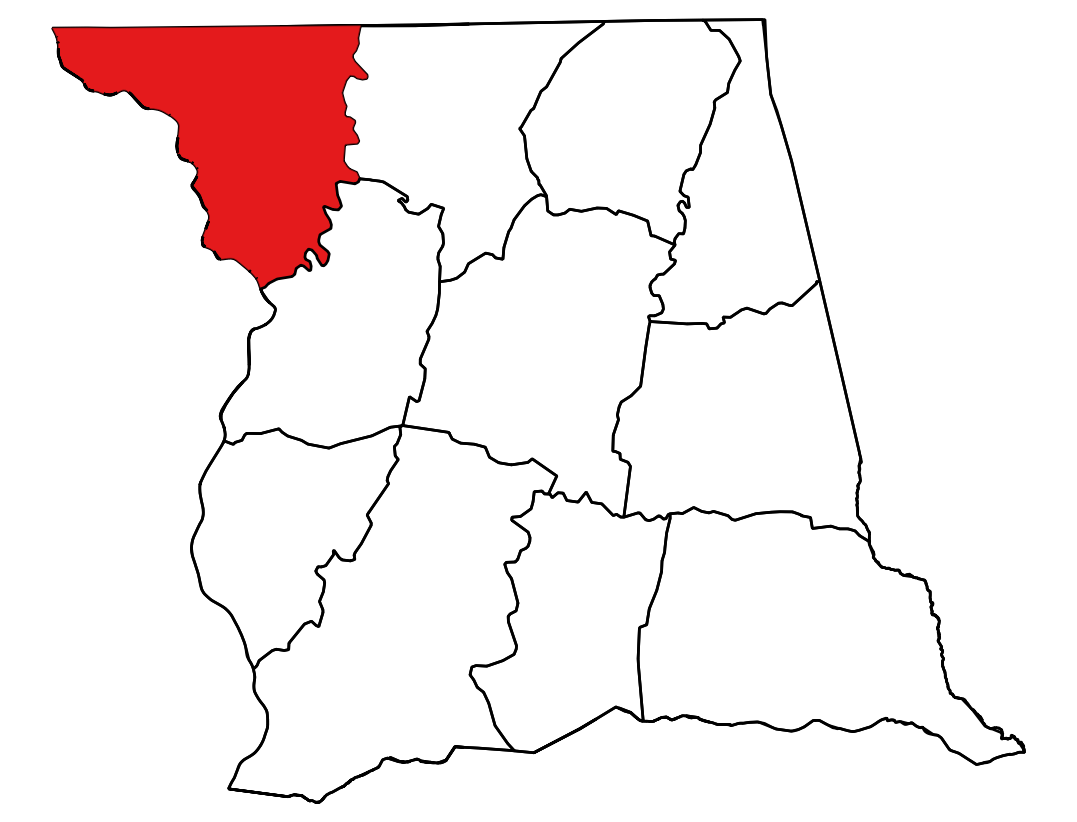
- Location of Eldorado Township in Montgomery County

- Location of Montgomery County in North Carolina
- Country: United States
- State: North Carolina
- County: Montgomery

Area
  - Total: 48.97 sq mi (126.83 km^{2})
- Highest elevation (about 1 mile southeast of Blaine, North Carolina): 946 ft (288 m)
- Lowest elevation (Confluence of Uwharrie River and Yadkin River (Pee Dee River forms here)): 275 ft (84 m)

Population (2010)
  - Total: 1,873
  - Density: 38.25/sq mi (14.77/km^{2})
- Time zone: UTC-4 (EST)
  - Summer (DST): UTC-5 (EDT)
- Area codes: 910, 472

Eldorado Township, population 1,873, is one of eleven townships in Montgomery County, North Carolina, United States. Eldorado Township is 48.97 square miles (126.8 km^{2}) in size and is located in the northwestern corner of the county.

== Geography ==
Eldorado Township is drained by the Uwharrie River and Yadkin River, which together form the Pee Dee River. Tributaries to the Uwharrie River in Eldorado Township include Gold Mine Branch, Moccasin Creek, Horsepen Creek, and Crow Creek. Tributaries to the Yadkin River include Beaverdam Creek, Glady Fork, Stillhouse Run, Garr Creek, Reynolds Creek, Alls Fork, Reeves Spring Branch, and Dutch John Creek.
