= Silver Run Creek (Uwharrie River tributary) =

Stream in North Carolina, USA

Silver Run Creek Tributary to Uwharrie River
- Location of Silver Run Creek mouth Silver Run Creek (Uwharrie River tributary) (the United States)

Location
- Country: United States
- State: North Carolina
- County: Randolph

Physical characteristics
- Source: Robbins Branch (Hannahs Creek) divide
  - location: west side of Brush Mountain
  - coordinates: 35°36′32″N 079°55′42″W
  - elevation: 670 ft (200 m)
- Mouth: Uwharrie River
  - location: about 4 miles northeast of New Hope, North Carolina
  - coordinates: 35°35′26″N 079°57′57″W
  - elevation: 371 ft (113 m)
- Length: 3.39 mi (5.46 km)
- Basin size: 2.07 square miles (5.4 km^{2})
- Discharge
  - location: Uwharrie River
  - average: 2.54 cu ft/s (0.072 m^{3}/s) at mouth with Uwharrie River

Basin features
- Progression: Uwharrie River → Pee Dee River → Winyah Bay → Atlantic Ocean
- River system: Pee Dee
- Tributaries
  - left: unnamed tributaries
  - right: unnamed tributaries
- Bridges: Lassister Mill Road

Silver Run Creek is a 3.35 mi (5.39 km) long 2nd order tributary to the Uwharrie River, in Randolph County, North Carolina.

== Course ==
Silver Run Creek rises on the Robbins Branch (Hannahs Creek) divide on the west side of Brush Mountain in Randolph County, North Carolina. Silver Run Creek then flows southwest to meet the Uwharrie River about 4 miles northeast of New Hope.

== Watershed ==
Silver Run Creek drains 2.07 square miles (5.4 km^{2}) of area, receives about 46.9 in/year of precipitation, has a topographic wetness index of 362.51 and is about 72% forested.

== See also ==
- List of rivers of North Carolina
