= Back Creek (Caraway Creek tributary) =

Stream in North Carolina, USA

Back Creek Tributary to Caraway Creek
- Location of Back Creek mouth Back Creek (Caraway Creek tributary) (the United States)

Location
- Country: United States
- State: North Carolina
- County: Randolph

Physical characteristics
- Source: Deep River divide
  - location: about 3 miles south of Randleman, North Carolina
  - coordinates: 35°47′43″N 079°50′05″W
  - elevation: 730 ft (220 m)
- Mouth: Caraway Creek
  - location: about 3 miles northeast of Farmer, North Carolina
  - coordinates: 35°41′12″N 079°56′20″W
  - elevation: 413 ft (126 m)
- Length: 9.78 mi (15.74 km)
- Basin size: 37.98 square miles (98.4 km^{2})
- Discharge
  - location: Caraway Creek
  - average: 42.46 cu ft/s (1.202 m^{3}/s) at mouth with Caraway Creek

Basin features
- Progression: Caraway Creek → Uwharrie River → Pee Dee River → Winyah Bay → Atlantic Ocean
- River system: Pee Dee
- Tributaries
  - left: Greenes Branch; Cedar Fork; Cable Creek
  - right: unnamed tributaries
- Waterbodies: Back Creek Lake
- Bridges: I-74, Turner Dairy Road, Health Dairy Road, Pineview Street, Spero Road, Lake Lucas Road, Old Lexington Road, Back Creek Road

Back Creek is a 9.78 mi (15.74 km) long 4th order tributary to Caraway Creek, in Randolph County, North Carolina.

== Course ==
Back Creek rises on the Deep River divide about 3 miles south of Randleman in Randolph County, North Carolina. Back Creek then flows south-southeast to meet Caraway Creek about 3 miles northeast of Farmer.

== Watershed ==
Back Creek drains 37.98 square miles (98.4 km^{2}) of area, receives about 46.8 in/year of precipitation, has a topographic wetness index of 374.06 and is about 52% forested.

== See also ==
- List of rivers of North Carolina
