= Mill Creek (Uwharrie River tributary) =

Stream in North Carolina, USA

Mill Creek Tributary to Uwharrie River
- Location of Mill Creek mouth Mill Creek (Uwharrie River tributary) (the United States)

Location
- Country: United States
- State: North Carolina
- County: Randolph

Physical characteristics
- Source: pond on Walkers Creek divide
  - location: about 5 miles west-northwest of Pisgah, North Carolina
  - coordinates: 35°33′31″N 079°56′51″W
  - elevation: 700 ft (210 m)
- Mouth: Uwharrie River
  - location: about 2 miles east of New Hope, North Carolina
  - coordinates: 35°33′13″N 079°58′25″W
  - elevation: 361 ft (110 m)
- Length: 2.12 mi (3.41 km)
- Basin size: 1.33 square miles (3.4 km^{2})
- Discharge
  - location: Uwharrie River
  - average: 1.69 cu ft/s (0.048 m^{3}/s) at mouth with Uwharrie River

Basin features
- Progression: Uwharrie River → Pee Dee River → Winyah Bay → Atlantic Ocean
- River system: Pee Dee
- Tributaries
  - left: unnamed tributaries
  - right: unnamed tributaries
- Bridges: High Pine Church Road, Lassister Mill Road

Mill Creek is a 2.12 mi (3.41 km) long 1st order tributary to the Uwharrie River, in Randolph County, North Carolina.

== Course ==
Mill Creek rises in a pond on the Walkers Creek divide about 5 miles west-northwest of Pisgah, North Carolina in Randolph County, North Carolina. Mill Creek then flows west to meet the Uwharrie River about 2 miles east of New Hope.

== Watershed ==
Mill Creek drains 1.33 square miles (3.4 km^{2}) of area, receives about 47.1 in/year of precipitation, has a topographic wetness index of 324.17 and is about 69% forested.

== See also ==
- List of rivers of North Carolina
