= Betty McGees Creek (Uwharrie River tributary) =

Stream in North Carolina, USA

Betty McGees Creek Tributary to Uwharrie River
- Location of Betty McGees Creek mouth Betty McGees Creek (Uwharrie River tributary) (the United States)

Location
- Country: United States
- State: North Carolina
- County: Randolph

Physical characteristics
- Source: Hannahs Creek divide
  - location: about 6 miles northwest of Pisgah in the Birkhead Mountains Wilderness
  - coordinates: 35°36′24″N 079°54′10″W
  - elevation: 810 ft (250 m)
- Mouth: Uwharrie River
  - location: about 5 miles northeast of New Hope, North Carolina
  - coordinates: 35°36′30″N 079°58′06″W
  - elevation: 375 ft (114 m)
- Length: 9.09 mi (14.63 km)
- Basin size: 8.29 square miles (21.5 km^{2})
- Discharge
  - location: Uwharrie River
  - average: 9.73 cu ft/s (0.276 m^{3}/s) at mouth with Uwharrie River

Basin features
- Progression: Uwharrie River → Pee Dee River → Winyah Bay → Atlantic Ocean
- River system: Pee Dee
- Tributaries
  - left: Talbotts Branch
  - right: unnamed tributaries
- Bridges: Tot Hill Farm Road, Stone Bridge Road, Tot Hill Farm Road, Lassister Mill Road

Betty McGees Creek is a 9.09 mi (14.63 km) long 2nd order tributary of the Uwharrie River, in Randolph County, North Carolina.

== Variant names ==
According to the Geographic Names Information System, it has also been known historically as:

- Bellie McGees Creek
- Bettie McGees Creek

== Course ==
Betty McGees Creek rises on the Hannahs Creek divide in the Birkhead Mountains Wilderness about 6 miles northwest of Pisgah in Randolph County, North Carolina. Betty McGees Creek then flows north and then curves southwest to meet the Uwharrie River about 5 miles northeast of New Hope.

== Watershed ==
Betty McGees Creek drains 8.29 square miles (21.5 km^{2}) of area, receives about 46.9 in/year of precipitation, has a topographic wetness index of 348.09 and is about 79% forested.

== See also ==
- List of rivers of North Carolina
