= Lakes Creek (tributary) =

Stream in North Carolina, USA

Lakes Creek Tributary to Uwharrie River
- Location of Lakes Creek mouth Lakes Creek (tributary) (the United States)

Location
- Country: United States
- State: North Carolina
- County: Randolph

Physical characteristics
- Source: pond on Duncombe Creek divide
  - location: about 0.25 miles north of Eleazer, North Carolina
  - coordinates: 35°31′01″N 079°58′16″W
  - elevation: 549 ft (167 m)
- Mouth: Uwharrie River
  - location: about 3 miles southeast of Pinson, North Carolina
  - coordinates: 35°30′52″N 079°59′23″W
  - elevation: 351 ft (107 m)
- Length: 0.7 mi (1.1 km)
- Basin size: 0.8 square miles (2.1 km^{2})
- Discharge
  - location: Uwharrie River
  - average: 1.06 cu ft/s (0.030 m^{3}/s) at mouth with Uwharrie River

Basin features
- Progression: Uwharrie River → Pee Dee River → Winyah Bay → Atlantic Ocean
- River system: Pee Dee
- Tributaries
  - left: unnamed tributaries
  - right: unnamed tributaries
- Bridges: none

Lakes Creek is a 0.7 mi (1.1 km) long 1st order tributary to the Uwharrie River, in Randolph County, North Carolina.

== Course ==
Lakes Creek rises in a pond on the Duncombe Creek divide about 0.25 miles north of Eleazer, North Carolina in Randolph County, North Carolina. Lakes Creek then flows west to meet the Uwharrie River about 3 miles southeast of Pinson.

== Watershed ==
Lakes Creek drains 0.8 square miles (2.1 km^{2}) of area, receives about 47.4 in/year of precipitation, has a topographic wetness index of 322.46 and is about 88% forested.

== See also ==
- List of rivers of North Carolina
