= Taylors Creek =

Taylors Creek may refer to:

- Taylors Creek (Canoochee Creek tributary), a stream in Georgia
- Taylors Creek, Georgia, a ghost town
- Taylors Creek (Kentucky), a stream in Kentucky
- Taylors Creek (Caraway Creek tributary), a stream in Randolph County, North Carolina
