= Taylors Creek (Caraway Creek tributary) =

Stream in North Carolina, USA

Taylors Creek Tributary to Caraway Creek
- Location of Taylors Creek mouth Taylors Creek (Caraway Creek tributary) (the United States)

Location
- Country: United States
- State: North Carolina
- County: Randolph

Physical characteristics
- Source: Back Creek (Cedar Fork) divide
  - location: about 1 mile southwest of Asheboro, North Carolina
  - coordinates: 35°39′10″N 079°51′26″W
  - elevation: 768 ft (234 m)
- Mouth: Caraway Creek
  - location: about 0.5 miles northwest of Mechanic, North Carolina
  - coordinates: 35°39′15″N 079°56′38″W
  - elevation: 398 ft (121 m)
- Length: 7.74 mi (12.46 km)
- Basin size: 10.25 square miles (26.5 km^{2})
- Discharge
  - location: Caraway Creek
  - average: 12.02 cu ft/s (0.340 m^{3}/s) at mouth with Caraway Creek

Basin features
- Progression: Caraway Creek → Uwharrie River → Pee Dee River → Winyah Bay → Atlantic Ocean
- River system: Pee Dee
- Tributaries
  - left: unnamed tributaries
  - right: unnamed tributaries
- Bridges: Briles Drive, Billy Walker Road, NC 49, Union Church Road, Lassiter Mill Road

Taylors Creek is a 7.74 mi (12.46 km) long 3rd order tributary to Caraway Creek, in Randolph County, North Carolina.

== Course ==
Taylors Creek rises on the Back Creek divide about 1 mile southwest of Asheboro in Randolph County, North Carolina. Taylors Creek then flows west to meet Caraway Creek about 0.5 miles northwest of Mechanic.

== Watershed ==
Taylors Creek drains 10.25 square miles (26.5 km^{2}) of area, receives about 46.9 in/year of precipitation, has a topographic wetness index of 374.12 and is about 65% forested.

== See also ==
- List of rivers of North Carolina
