= Lacey Branch (Lanes Creek tributary) =

Stream in North Carolina, USA

Lacey Branch Tributary to Lanes Creek
- Location of Lacey Branch mouth Lacey Branch (Lanes Creek tributary) (the United States)

Location
- Country: United States
- State: North Carolina
- County: Anson; Union
- City: Peachland

Physical characteristics
- Source: Becky Branch divide
  - location: pond about 1 mile northeast of Marshville, North Carolina
  - coordinates: 35°00′59″N 080°20′27″W
  - elevation: 558 ft (170 m)
- Mouth: Lanes Creek
  - location: Peachland, North Carolina
  - coordinates: 35°00′04″N 080°16′23″W
  - elevation: 365 ft (111 m)
- Length: 6.08 mi (9.78 km)
- Basin size: 4.25 square miles (11.0 km^{2})
- Discharge
  - location: Lanes Creek
  - average: 5.10 cu ft/s (0.144 m^{3}/s) at mouth with Lanes Creek

Basin features
- Progression: Lanes Creek → Rocky River → Pee Dee River → Winyah Bay → Atlantic Ocean
- River system: Pee Dee River
- Tributaries
  - left: unnamed tributaries
  - right: unnamed tributaries
- Bridges: Marshville-Olive Branch Road, Clonnie Strawn Road, Pulpwood Yard Road, German Hill Road

Lacey Branch is a 6.08 mi (9.78 km) long 1st order tributary to Lanes Creek in Anson County, North Carolina.

== Course ==
Lacey Branch rises in a pond about 1 mile northeast of Marshville, North Carolina in Union County. Lacey Branch then flows east-southeast into Anson County to meet Lanes Creek on the northwest side of Peachland.

== Watershed ==
Lacey Branch drains 4.25 square miles (11.0 km^{2}) of area, receives about 48.1 in/year of precipitation, has a topographic wetness index of 430.41 and is about 39% forested.
