= Little Caraway Creek (Caraway Creek tributary) =

Stream in North Carolina, USA

Little Caraway Creek Tributary to Caraway Creek
- Location of Little Caraway Creek mouth Little Caraway Creek (Caraway Creek tributary) (the United States)

Location
- Country: United States
- State: North Carolina
- County: Randolph

Physical characteristics
- Source: divide between Caraway Creek and Uwharrie River
  - location: about 0.5 miles south of Hillsville, North Carolina
  - coordinates: 35°49′19″N 079°56′22″W
  - elevation: 718 ft (219 m)
- Mouth: Caraway Creek
  - location: about 1 mile northeast of Motleta, North Carolina
  - coordinates: 35°44′44″N 079°56′06″W
  - elevation: 446 ft (136 m)
- Length: 7.04 mi (11.33 km)
- Basin size: 10.26 square miles (26.6 km^{2})
- Discharge
  - location: Caraway Creek
  - average: 12.02 cu ft/s (0.340 m^{3}/s) at mouth with Caraway Creek

Basin features
- Progression: Caraway Creek → Uwharrie River → Pee Dee River → Winyah Bay → Atlantic Ocean
- River system: Pee Dee
- Tributaries
  - left: unnamed tributaries
  - right: unnamed tributaries
- Bridges: Mt. Gilead Church Road, Earnhardt Road

Little Caraway Creek is a 7.04 mi (11.33 km) long 3rd order tributary to Caraway Creek, in Randolph County, North Carolina.

== Course ==
Little Caraway Creek rises on the Caraway Creek and Uwharrie River divide about 0.5 miles south of Hillsville in Randolph County, North Carolina. Little Caraway Creek then flows south to meet Caraway Creek about 1 mile northeast of Motleta.

== Watershed ==
Little Caraway Creek drains 10.26 square miles (26.6 km^{2}) of area, receives about 46.4 in/year of precipitation, has a topographic wetness index of 365.93 and is about 61% forested.

== See also ==
- List of rivers of North Carolina
