= Rocky Branch (Lanes Creek tributary) =

Stream in North Carolina, USA

Rocky Branch Tributary to Lanes Creek
- Location of Rocky Branch mouth Rocky Branch (Lanes Creek tributary) (the United States)

Location
- Country: United States
- State: North Carolina
- County: Anson

Physical characteristics
- Source: Cribs Creek divide
  - location: about 2.5 miles north of Peachland, North Carolina
  - coordinates: 35°02′46″N 080°16′03″W
  - elevation: 490 ft (150 m)
- Mouth: Lanes Creek
  - location: about 1.5 miles north of Peachland, North Carolina
  - coordinates: 35°01′11″N 080°14′44″W
  - elevation: 335 ft (102 m)
- Length: 1.40 mi (2.25 km)
- Basin size: 1.90 square miles (4.9 km^{2})
- Discharge
  - location: Lanes Creek
  - average: 2.33 cu ft/s (0.066 m^{3}/s) at mouth with Lanes Creek

Basin features
- Progression: Lanes Creek → Rocky River → Pee Dee River → Winyah Bay → Atlantic Ocean
- River system: Pee Dee River
- Tributaries
  - left: unnamed tributaries
  - right: unnamed tributaries
- Bridges: Maske Road, Newton Moore Road

Rocky Branch is a 1.40 mi (2.25 km) long 2nd order tributary to Lanes Creek in Anson County, North Carolina.

== Course ==
Rocky Branch rises about 1.5 miles northeast of Peachland, North Carolina. Rocky Branch then flows southeast to meet Lanes Creek about 2.5 miles north of Peachland.

== Watershed ==
Rocky Branch drains 1.90 square miles (4.9 km^{2}) of area, receives about 48.0 in/year of precipitation, has a topographic wetness index of 429.73 and is about 38% forested.
