= Barnes Creek (Uwharrie River tributary) =

Stream in North Carolina, USA

Barnes Creek Tributary to Uwharrie River
- Location of Barnes Creek mouth Barnes Creek (Uwharrie River tributary) (the United States)

Location
- Country: United States
- State: North Carolina
- County: Randolph; Montgomery

Physical characteristics
- Source: West Fork Little River divide
  - location: about 2 miles southwest of Pisgah, North Carolina
  - coordinates: 35°31′09″N 079°54′47″W
  - elevation: 750 ft (230 m)
- Mouth: Uwharrie River
  - location: about 1.5 miles north of Uwharrie, North Carolina
  - coordinates: 35°26′03″N 080°00′11″W
  - elevation: 305 ft (93 m)
- Length: 11.39 mi (18.33 km)
- Basin size: 24.09 square miles (62.4 km^{2})
- Discharge
  - location: Uwharrie River
  - average: 22.67 cu ft/s (0.642 m^{3}/s) at mouth with Uwharrie River

Basin features
- Progression: Uwharrie River → Pee Dee River → Winyah Bay → Atlantic Ocean
- River system: Pee Dee
- Tributaries
  - left: Panther Branch; Hogpen Branch
  - right: Poison Fork
- Bridges: Randall Hurley Road, Horseshoe Bend Road (x2), Flint Hill Road, Tower Road, Ophir Road

Barnes Creek is a 11.39 mi (18.33 km) long 3rd order tributary to the Uwharrie River, in Montgomery County, North Carolina.

== Variant names ==
According to the Geographic Names Information System, it has also been known historically as:

- Barns Creek

== Course ==
Barnes Creek rises on the West Fork Little River divide about 2 miles southwest of Pisgah in Randolph County, North Carolina. Barnes Creek then flows southwest to meet the Uwharrie River about 1.5 miles north of Uwharrie.

== Watershed ==
Barnes Creek drains 24.09 square miles (62.4 km^{2}) of area, receives about 47.5 in/year of precipitation, has a topographic wetness index of 343.93 and is about 81% forested.

== See also ==
- List of rivers of North Carolina
