= Crow Creek =

Crow Creek may refer to the following in the United States:

== Bodies of water ==
- Crow Creek (Alaska), a tributary of Turnagain Arm
- Crow Creek (South Dakota), the site of the Crow Creek massacre
- Crow Creek (South Platte River tributary), in Wyoming and Colorado
- Crow Creek (Uwharrie River tributary), a stream in Montgomery and Randolph counties, North Carolina

== Other ==
- Crow Creek National Forest in Wyoming
- Crow Creek Indian Reservation in South Dakota

== See also ==
- Crows Creek, Missouri
