= Jackson Creek (Uwharrie River tributary) =

Stream in North Carolina, USA

Jackson Creek Tributary to Uwharrie River
- Location of Jackson Creek mouth Jackson Creek (Uwharrie River tributary) (the United States)

Location
- Country: United States
- State: North Carolina
- County: Randolph

Physical characteristics
- Source: Plummer Creek divide
  - location: about 3 miles east of Silver Valley, North Carolina
  - coordinates: 35°43′55″N 080°03′15″W
  - elevation: 778 ft (237 m)
- Mouth: Uwharrie River
  - location: about 1.5 miles northeast of Farmer, North Carolina
  - coordinates: 35°40′07″N 079°58′20″W
  - elevation: 397 ft (121 m)
- Length: 10.40 mi (16.74 km)
- Basin size: 19.34 square miles (50.1 km^{2})
- Discharge
  - location: Uwharrie River
  - average: 22.04 cu ft/s (0.624 m^{3}/s) at mouth with Uwharrie River

Basin features
- Progression: Uwharrie River → Pee Dee River → Winyah Bay → Atlantic Ocean
- River system: Pee Dee River
- Tributaries
  - left: unnamed tributaries
  - right: South Fork
- Bridges: Ross Wood Road, Loflin Hill Road, Summey Town Road, Jackson Creek Road, Bescher Chapel Road, Gallimore Dairy Road

Jackson Creek is a 10.40 mi (16.74 km) long 3rd order tributary to the Uwharrie River in Randolph County, North Carolina.

== Course ==
Jackson Creek rises on the Plummer Creek divide about 3 miles east of Silver Valley, North Carolina. Jackson Creek then flows southeasterly to join the Uwharrie River about 1.5 miles northeast of Farmer, North Carolina.

== Watershed ==
Jackson Creek drains 19.34 square miles (50.1 km^{2}) of area, receives about 46.5 in/year of precipitation, has a wetness index of 362.78 and is about 64% forested.

== See also ==
- List of rivers of North Carolina
