= Second Creek (Uwharrie River tributary) =

Stream in North Carolina, USA

Second Creek Tributary to Uwharrie River
- Location of Second Creek mouth Second Creek (Uwharrie River tributary) (the United States)

Location
- Country: United States
- State: North Carolina
- County: Randolph

Physical characteristics
- Source: Toms Creek divide
  - location: about 1.5 miles northwest of Martha, North Carolina
  - coordinates: 35°37′48″N 080°02′16″W
  - elevation: 545 ft (166 m)
- Mouth: Uwharrie River
  - location: about 3 miles east of Martha, North Carolina
  - coordinates: 35°36′28″N 079°58′10″W
  - elevation: 378 ft (115 m)
- Length: 5.79 mi (9.32 km)
- Basin size: 16.98 square miles (44.0 km^{2})
- Discharge
  - location: Uwharrie River
  - average: 19.37 cu ft/s (0.548 m^{3}/s) at mouth with Uwharrie River

Basin features
- Progression: Uwharrie River → Pee Dee River → Winyah Bay → Atlantic Ocean
- River system: Pee Dee River
- Tributaries
  - left: unnamed tributaries
  - right: South Fork Second Creek; Twomile Branch
- Bridges: Martha Drive, Salem Church Road, NC 49, Oak Grove Church Road

Second Creek is a 5.79 mi (9.32 km) long 3rd order tributary to the Uwharrie River in Randolph County, North Carolina.

== Course ==
Second Creek rises on the Toms Creek divide about 1.5 miles northwest of Martha, North Carolina. Second Creek then flows southeasterly to join the Uwharrie River about 3 miles east of Martha.

== Watershed ==
Second Creek drains 16.98 square miles (44.0 km^{2}) of area, receives about 46.9 in/year of precipitation, has a wetness index of 395.86 and is about 49% forested.

== See also ==
- List of rivers of North Carolina
