= Blackwell Branch (Lanes Creek tributary) =

Stream in North Carolina, USA

Blackwell Branch Tributary to Lanes Creek
- Location of Blackwell Branch mouth Blackwell Branch (Lanes Creek tributary) (the United States)

Location
- Country: United States
- State: North Carolina
- County: Anson

Physical characteristics
- Source: confluence of Maness and Caudle Branches
  - location: about 2 miles northwest of Peachland, North Carolina
  - coordinates: 35°01′26″N 080°17′20″W
  - elevation: 418 ft (127 m)
- Mouth: Lanes Creek
  - location: about 0.5 miles north of Peachland, North Carolina
  - coordinates: 35°00′40″N 080°15′35″W
  - elevation: 349 ft (106 m)
- Length: 3.19 mi (5.13 km)
- Basin size: 8.05 square miles (20.8 km^{2})
- Discharge
  - location: Lanes Creek
  - average: 9.40 cu ft/s (0.266 m^{3}/s) at mouth with Lanes Creek

Basin features
- Progression: Lanes Creek → Rocky River → Pee Dee River → Winyah Bay → Atlantic Ocean
- River system: Pee Dee River
- Tributaries
  - left: Caudle Branch; Mile Branch
  - right: Maness Branch
- Bridges: Deep Springs Church Road, Savannah Road

Blackwell Branch is a 3.19 mi (5.13 km) long 2nd order tributary to Lanes Creek in Anson County, North Carolina.

== Course ==
Blackwell Branch is formed at the confluence of Maness Branch and Caudle Branch about 2 miles northwest of Peachland, North Carolina. Blackwell Branch then flows southeasterly to meet Lanes Creek about 0.5 miles north of Peachland.

== Watershed ==
Blackwell Branch drains 8.05 square miles (20.8 km^{2}) of area, receives about 48.0 in/year of precipitation, has a topographic wetness index of 434.25 and is about 44% forested.
