= Wide Mouth Branch =

Stream in North Carolina, USA

Wide Mouth Branch Tributary to Lanes Creek
- Location of Wide Mouth Branch mouth Wide Mouth Branch (the United States)

Location
- Country: United States
- State: North Carolina
- County: Anson; Union
- City: Marshville

Physical characteristics
- Source: Salem Creek divide
  - location: pond on the northeast side of Marshville, North Carolina
  - coordinates: 35°00′22″N 080°21′02″W
  - elevation: 552 ft (168 m)
- Mouth: Lanes Creek
  - location: about 0.5 miles west of Peachland, North Carolina
  - coordinates: 34°59′08″N 080°17′27″W
  - elevation: 368 ft (112 m)
- Length: 4.41 mi (7.10 km)
- Basin size: 4.28 square miles (11.1 km^{2})
- Discharge
  - location: Lanes Creek
  - average: 5.14 cu ft/s (0.146 m^{3}/s) at mouth with Lanes Creek

Basin features
- Progression: Lanes Creek → Rocky River → Pee Dee River → Winyah Bay → Atlantic Ocean
- River system: Pee Dee River
- Tributaries
  - left: unnamed tributaries
  - right: unnamed tributaries
- Bridges: Old Peachland Road, Gaddy Road, Curtis Lane, US 74

Wide Mouth Branch is a 4.41 mi (7.10 km) long 3rd order tributary to Lanes Creek in Anson County, North Carolina. This is the only stream of this name in the United States.

== Course ==
Wide Mouth Branch rises in a pond on the northeast side of Marshville, North Carolina in Union County. Wide Mouth Branch then flows east-southeast into Anson County to meet Lanes Creek about 0.5 miles west of Peachland.

== Watershed ==
Wide Mouth Branch drains 4.28 square miles (11.1 km^{2}) of area, receives about 48.1 in/year of precipitation, has a topographic wetness index of 447.40 and is about 23% forested.
