= Spencer Creek (Uwharrie River tributary) =

Stream in North Carolina, USA

Spencer Creek Tributary to Uwharrie River
- Location of Spencer Creek mouth Spencer Creek (Uwharrie River tributary) (the United States)

Location
- Country: United States
- State: North Carolina
- County: Montgomery

Physical characteristics
- Source: Dumas Creek divide
  - location: about 4 miles northwest of Lovejoy, North Carolina
  - coordinates: 35°26′32″N 079°57′03″W
  - elevation: 760 ft (230 m)
- Mouth: Uwharrie River
  - location: about 1 mile northwest of Uwharrie, North Carolina
  - coordinates: 35°25′32″N 080°00′54″W
  - elevation: 305 ft (93 m)
- Length: 5.73 mi (9.22 km)
- Basin size: 24.09 square miles (62.4 km^{2})
- Discharge
  - location: Uwharrie River
  - average: 9.37 cu ft/s (0.265 m^{3}/s) at mouth with Uwharrie River

Basin features
- Progression: Uwharrie River → Pee Dee River → Winyah Bay → Atlantic Ocean
- River system: Pee Dee
- Tributaries
  - left: Sand Branch; Cattail Branch
- Bridges: Ophir Road

Spencer Creek is a 5.73 mi (9.22 km) long 2nd order tributary to the Uwharrie River, in Montgomery County, North Carolina, United States.

== Course ==
Spencer Creek rises on the Dumas Creek divide about 4 miles northwest of Lovejoy in Montgomery County, North Carolina. Spencer Creek then flows southwest and curves northwest to meet the Uwharrie River about 1 mile north of Uwharrie.

== Watershed ==
Spencer Creek drains 7.78 square miles (20.2 km^{2}) of area, receives about 47.8 in/year of precipitation, has a topographic wetness index of 347.87 and is about 88% forested.

== See also ==
- List of rivers of North Carolina
