= Walkers Creek (Uwharrie River tributary) =

Stream in North Carolina, USA

Walkers Creek Tributary to Uwharrie River
- Location of Walkers Creek mouth Walkers Creek (Uwharrie River tributary) (the United States)

Location
- Country: United States
- State: North Carolina
- County: Randolph

Physical characteristics
- Source: pond on Barnes Creek and Poison Fork divide
  - location: about 5 miles northwest of Abner, North Carolina
  - coordinates: 35°32′12″N 079°56′06″W
  - elevation: 780 ft (240 m)
- Mouth: Uwharrie River
  - location: about 4 miles east of Pinson, North Carolina
  - coordinates: 35°31′37″N 079°59′01″W
  - elevation: 354 ft (108 m)
- Length: 4.78 mi (7.69 km)
- Basin size: 4.17 square miles (10.8 km^{2})
- Discharge
  - location: Uwharrie River
  - average: 5.06 cu ft/s (0.143 m^{3}/s) at mouth with Uwharrie River

Basin features
- Progression: Uwharrie River → Pee Dee River → Winyah Bay → Atlantic Ocean
- River system: Pee Dee
- Tributaries
  - left: unnamed tributaries
  - right: unnamed tributaries
- Bridges: Pisgah Covered Bridge Road, Lassister Mill Road

Walkers Creek is a 4.78 mi (7.69 km) long 2nd order tributary to the Uwharrie River, in Randolph County, North Carolina.

== Course ==
Walkers Creek rises in a pond on the Barnes Creek and Poison Fork divide about 5 miles northwest of Abner, North Carolina in Randolph County, North Carolina. Walkers Creek flows north then curves southwest to meet the Uwharrie River about 4 miles east of Pinson.

== Watershed ==
Walkers Creek drains 4.17 square miles (10.8 km^{2}) of area, receives about 47.3 in/year of precipitation, has a topographic wetness index of 338.54 and is about 77% forested.

== See also ==
- List of rivers of North Carolina
