= Twomile Creek (Uwharrie River tributary) =

Stream in North Carolina, USA

Twomile Creek Tributary to Uwharrie River
- Location of Twomile Creek mouth Twomile Creek (Uwharrie River tributary) (the United States)

Location
- Country: United States
- State: North Carolina
- County: Randolph

Physical characteristics
- Source: Twomile Branch divide
  - location: about 1.5 miles southeast of Martha, North Carolina
  - coordinates: 35°35′57″N 079°59′52″W
  - elevation: 580 ft (180 m)
- Mouth: Uwharrie River
  - location: about 3 miles southeast of Martha, North Carolina
  - coordinates: 35°35′41″N 079°58′22″W
  - elevation: 377 ft (115 m)
- Length: 2.24 mi (3.60 km)
- Basin size: 1.00 square mile (2.6 km^{2})
- Discharge
  - location: Uwharrie River
  - average: 1.25 cu ft/s (0.035 m^{3}/s) at mouth with Uwharrie River

Basin features
- Progression: Uwharrie River → Pee Dee River → Winyah Bay → Atlantic Ocean
- River system: Pee Dee River
- Tributaries
  - left: unnamed tributaries
  - right: unnamed tributaries
- Bridges: Oak Grove Church Road

Twomile Creek is a 2.24 mi (3.60 km) long 1st order tributary to the Uwharrie River in Randolph County, North Carolina.

== Course ==
Twomile Creek rises on the Twomile Branch divide about 1.5 miles southeast of Martha, North Carolina. Twomile Creek then flows southeasterly to join the Uwharrie River about 3 miles southeast of Martha.

== Watershed ==
Twomile Creek drains 1.00 square mile (2.6 km^{2}) of area, receives about 46.9 in/year of precipitation, has a wetness index of 384.58 and is about 49% forested.

== See also ==
- List of rivers of North Carolina
