= Big Branch (Lanes Creek tributary) =

Stream in North Carolina, USA

Big Branch Tributary to Lanes Creek
- Location of Big Branch mouth Big Branch (Lanes Creek tributary) (the United States)

Location
- Country: United States
- State: North Carolina
- County: Anson

Physical characteristics
- Source: Cribs Creek divide
  - location: about 2 miles southeast of Fountain Hill, North Carolina
  - coordinates: 35°03′58″N 080°15′01″W
  - elevation: 440 ft (130 m)
- Mouth: Lanes Creek
  - location: about 2 miles north of Griffins Crossroads, North Carolina
  - coordinates: 35°02′17″N 080°15′01″W
  - elevation: 318 ft (97 m)
- Length: 3.33 mi (5.36 km)
- Basin size: 4.62 square miles (12.0 km^{2})
- Discharge
  - location: Lanes Creek
  - average: 5.47 cu ft/s (0.155 m^{3}/s) at mouth with Lanes Creek

Basin features
- Progression: Lanes Creek → Rocky River → Pee Dee River → Winyah Bay → Atlantic Ocean
- River system: Pee Dee River
- Tributaries
  - left: unnamed tributaries
  - right: Flag Branch
- Bridges: Tucker Road, Bowers Road, Kiker Road, Birmingham Road

Big Branch is a 3.33 mi (5.36 km) long 2nd order tributary to Lanes Creek in Anson County, North Carolina.

== Course ==
Big Branch rises about 2 miles southeast of Fountain Hill, North Carolina. Big Branch then flows southeast to meet Lanes Creek about 2 miles north of Griffins Crossroads.

== Watershed ==
Big Branch drains 4.62 square miles (12.0 km^{2}) of area, receives about 48.0 in/year of precipitation, has a topographic wetness index of 420.54 and is about 60% forested.
