= Caraway Creek (Uwharrie River tributary) =

Stream in North Carolina, USA

Caraway Creek Tributary to Uwharrie River
- Location of Caraway Creek mouth Caraway Creek (Uwharrie River tributary) (the United States)

Location
- Country: United States
- State: North Carolina
- County: Randolph

Physical characteristics
- Source: divide between Caraway Creek and Deep River (via Muddy Creek)
  - location: about 0.25 miles east of Progress, North Carolina
  - coordinates: 35°52′58″N 079°56′07″W
  - elevation: 790 ft (240 m)
- Mouth: Uwharrie River
  - location: about 0.5 miles east of Farmer, North Carolina
  - coordinates: 35°39′14″N 079°57′30″W
  - elevation: 390 ft (120 m)
- Length: 25.76 mi (41.46 km)
- Basin size: 98.10 square miles (254.1 km^{2})
- Discharge
  - location: Uwharrie River
  - average: 105.77 cu ft/s (2.995 m^{3}/s) at mouth with Uwharrie River

Basin features
- Progression: Uwharrie River → Pee Dee River → Winyah Bay → Atlantic Ocean
- River system: Pee Dee
- Tributaries
  - left: Back Creek; Taylors Creek
  - right: Little Caraway Creek
- Bridges: Old Glenola Road, Creekview Drive, Roy Farlow Road, Old Marlboro Road, Beeson Farm Road, Beckerdite Road, Caraway Mountain Road, Jenco Road, US 64, Ridges Mountain Road, Golden Meadow Road, Old NC 49

Caraway Creek is a 25.76 mi (41.46 km) long 5th order tributary to the Uwharrie River, in Randolph County, North Carolina.

== Course ==
Caraway Creek rises on the Deep River divide about 0.25 miles (0.40 km) east of Progress in Randolph County, North Carolina. Caraway Creek then flows south to meet the Uwharrie River about 0.5 miles (0.80 km) east of Farmer.

== Watershed ==
Caraway Creek drains 98.10 square miles (254.1 km^{2}) of area, receives about 46.7 inches (1,190 mm) of precipitation annually, has a topographic wetness index of 372.93 and is about 54% forested.

== See also ==
- List of rivers of North Carolina
