= Mill Creek (Lanes Creek tributary) =

Stream in North Carolina, USA

Mill Creek Tributary to Lanes Creek
- Location of Mill Creek mouth Mill Creek (Lanes Creek tributary) (the United States)

Location
- Country: United States
- State: North Carolina; South Carolina
- County: Union (NC); Chesterfield (SC)

Physical characteristics
- Source: Mangum Branch divide
  - location: about 4 miles northeast of Dudley, South Carolina
  - coordinates: 34°49′12″N 080°27′55″W
  - elevation: 570 ft (170 m)
- Mouth: Lanes Creek
  - location: about 1 mile northeast of Beulah Church
  - coordinates: 34°50′43″N 080°25′44″W
  - elevation: 490 ft (150 m)
- Length: 3.39 mi (5.46 km)
- Basin size: 5.22 square miles (13.5 km^{2})
- Discharge
  - location: Lanes Creek
  - average: 6.17 cu ft/s (0.175 m^{3}/s) at mouth with Lanes Creek

Basin features
- Progression: Lanes Creek → Rocky River → Pee Dee River → Winyah Bay → Atlantic Ocean
- River system: Pee Dee River
- Tributaries
  - left: Gibbs Branch
  - right: unnamed tributaries
- Bridges: Myers Lane, Robert Funderburk Road, Bud Pyler Road, Stack Road, Medlin Road, Landsford Road, US 601

Mill Creek is a 3.39 mi (5.46 km) long 2nd order tributary to Lanes Creek in Union County, North Carolina.

== Course ==
Mill Creek rises about 4 miles northeast of Dudley, South Carolina in Chesterfield County. Mill Creek then flows north into North Carolina to meet Lanes Creek about 1 mile northeast of Beulah Church.

== Watershed ==
Mill Creek drains 5.22 square miles (13.5 km^{2}) of area, receives about 48.5 in/year of precipitation, has a topographic wetness index of 467.85 and is about 42% forested.
