= Lick Branch (Lanes Creek tributary) =

Stream in North Carolina, USA

Lick Branch Tributary to Lanes Creek
- Location of Lick Branch mouth Lick Branch (Lanes Creek tributary) (the United States)

Location
- Country: United States
- State: North Carolina
- County: Union
- City: Marshville

Physical characteristics
- Source: Salem Creek divide
  - location: pond on the southwest side of Marshville, North Carolina
  - coordinates: 34°58′56″N 080°22′38″W
  - elevation: 558 ft (170 m)
- Mouth: Lanes Creek
  - location: about 2 miles northeast of Marshville, North Carolina
  - coordinates: 34°58′17″N 080°18′33″W
  - elevation: 389 ft (119 m)
- Length: 4.72 mi (7.60 km)
- Basin size: 3.97 square miles (10.3 km^{2})
- Discharge
  - location: Lanes Creek
  - average: 4.81 cu ft/s (0.136 m^{3}/s) at mouth with Lanes Creek

Basin features
- Progression: Lanes Creek → Rocky River → Pee Dee River → Winyah Bay → Atlantic Ocean
- River system: Pee Dee River
- Tributaries
  - left: unnamed tributaries
  - right: unnamed tributaries
- Bridges: W Main Street, Morgan Place (x2), S Elm Street, S White Street, Hasty Road

Lick Branch is a 4.72 mi (7.60 km) long 2nd order tributary to Lanes Creek in Union County, North Carolina.

== Course ==
Lick Branch rises in a pond on the southwest side of Marshville, North Carolina in Union County. Lick Branch then flows east to meet Lanes Creek about 2 miles southeast of Marshville.

== Watershed ==
Lick Branch drains 3.97 square miles (10.3 km^{2}) of area, receives about 48.2 in/year of precipitation, has a topographic wetness index of 442.68 and is about 31% forested.
