= Duncombe Creek (Uwharrie River tributary) =

Stream in North Carolina, USA

Duncombe Creek Tributary to Uwharrie River
- Location of Duncombe Creek mouth Duncombe Creek (Uwharrie River tributary) (the United States)

Location
- Country: United States
- State: North Carolina
- County: Randolph; Montgomery

Physical characteristics
- Source: Poison Fork divide
  - location: east side of King Mountain
  - coordinates: 35°27′14″N 080°00′18″W
  - elevation: 830 ft (250 m)
- Mouth: Uwharrie River
  - location: about 4 miles south-southeast of Coggins Mine
  - coordinates: 35°31′01″N 079°57′06″W
  - elevation: 315 ft (96 m)
- Length: 5.59 mi (9.00 km)
- Basin size: 4.29 square miles (11.1 km^{2})
- Discharge
  - location: Uwharrie River
  - average: 5.19 cu ft/s (0.147 m^{3}/s) at mouth with Uwharrie River

Basin features
- Progression: Uwharrie River → Pee Dee River → Winyah Bay → Atlantic Ocean
- River system: Pee Dee
- Tributaries
  - left: unnamed tributaries
  - right: unnamed tributaries
- Bridges: Grissom Road, Ophir Road

Duncombe Creek is a 5.59 mi (9.00 km) long 1st order tributary to the Uwharrie River, in Montgomery County, North Carolina.

== Course ==
Duncombe Creek rises on the Poison Fork divide on the east side of King Mountain in Randolph County, North Carolina. Duncombe Creek then flows southwest to meet the Uwharrie River about 4 miles south-southeast of Coggins Mine.

== Watershed ==
Duncombe Creek drains 4.29 square miles (11.1 km^{2}) of area, receives about 47.5 in/year of precipitation, has a topographic wetness index of 364.55 and is about 79% forested.

== See also ==
- List of rivers of North Carolina
