= Narrows Branch (Uwharrie River tributary) =

Stream in North Carolina, USA

Narrows Branch Tributary to Uwharrie River
- Location of Narrows Branch mouth Narrows Branch (Uwharrie River tributary) (the United States)

Location
- Country: United States
- State: North Carolina
- County: Randolph

Physical characteristics
- Source: unnamed tributary to Uwharrie River divide
  - location: about 3 miles northwest of Eleazar, North Carolina
  - coordinates: 35°31′48″N 080°00′18″W
  - elevation: 528 ft (161 m)
- Mouth: Uwharrie River
  - location: about 1 mile west of Eleazar, North Carolina
  - coordinates: 35°30′49″N 079°59′40″W
  - elevation: 358 ft (109 m)
- Length: 0.91 mi (1.46 km)
- Basin size: 0.58 square miles (1.5 km^{2})
- Discharge
  - location: Uwharrie River
  - average: 0.76 cu ft/s (0.022 m^{3}/s) at mouth with Uwharrie River

Basin features
- Progression: Uwharrie River → Pee Dee River → Winyah Bay → Atlantic Ocean
- River system: Pee Dee River
- Tributaries
  - left: unnamed tributaries
  - right: unnamed tributaries
- Bridges: Hopkins Drive

Narrows Branch is a 0.91 mi (1.46 km) long 2nd order tributary to the Uwharrie River in Randolph County, North Carolina.

== Course ==
Narrows Branch rises on the divide of an unnamed tributary to the Uwharrie River about 3 miles northwest of Eleazar, North Carolina. Narrows Branch then flows southeast to join the Uwharrie River about 1 mile west of Eleazar.

== Watershed ==
Narrows Branch drains 0.58 square miles (1.5 km^{2}) of area, receives about 47.3 in/year of precipitation, has a wetness index of 360.10 and is about 53% forested.

== See also ==
- List of rivers of North Carolina
