= Canebreak Branch =

Stream in North Carolina, US

Canebreak Branch Tributary to Lanes Creek
- Location of Canebreak Branch mouth Canebreak Branch (the United States)

Location
- Country: United States
- State: North Carolina
- County: Anson

Physical characteristics
- Source: Cribs Creek divide
  - location: about 0.5 miles southwest of Kikers, North Carolina
  - coordinates: 35°03′55″N 080°13′47″W
  - elevation: 452 ft (138 m)
- Mouth: Lanes Creek
  - location: about 2 miles north of Griffins Crossroads, North Carolina
  - coordinates: 35°02′27″N 080°13′01″W
  - elevation: 318 ft (97 m)
- Length: 1.35 mi (2.17 km)
- Basin size: 1.19 square miles (3.1 km^{2})
- Discharge
  - location: Lanes Creek
  - average: 1.44 cu ft/s (0.041 m^{3}/s) at mouth with Lanes Creek

Basin features
- Progression: Lanes Creek → Rocky River → Pee Dee River → Winyah Bay → Atlantic Ocean
- River system: Pee Dee River
- Tributaries
  - left: unnamed tributaries
  - right: unnamed tributaries
- Bridges: Birmingham Road, Kiker Road, Johnson Road

Canebreak Branch is a 1.35 mi (2.17 km) long 1st order tributary to Lanes Creek in Anson County, North Carolina. This is the only stream of this name in the United States.

== Course ==
Canebreak Branch rises about 0.5 miles southwest of Kikers, North Carolina. Canebreak Branch then flows southeast to meet Lanes about 2 miles north of Griffins Crossroads.

== Watershed ==
Canebreak Branch drains 1.19 square miles (3.1 km^{2}) of area, receives about 48.0 in/year of precipitation, has a topographic wetness index of 390.95 and is about 60% forested.
