= Norkett =

Norkett is a surname. Notable people with the surname include:

- Elli Norkett (1996–2017), Welsh rugby player
- Manni Norkett (born 2004), English football player

== See also ==
- Norkett Branch, a stream in North Carolina, US
