= Caraway (disambiguation) =

Caraway is a plant in the family Apiaceae whose seeds are used as a spice.

Caraway may also refer to:

- Black caraway

== Places ==
- Caraway, Arkansas, United States
- Caraway Mountains, North Carolina, United States
- Caraway Speedway, an automobile racetrack near Asheboro, North Carolina

== People ==
- Barbara Mallory Caraway (born 1956), Texas state representative
- Bryan Caraway (born 1984), American mixed martial artist
- Dwaine Caraway (born 1952), mayor of Dallas, Texas
- Elbert Caraway (1905–1975), American football and baseball player and coach
- Hattie Caraway (1878–1950), United States senator from Arkansas
- Nancie Caraway (born 1942), first lady of Hawaii
- Pat Caraway (1905–1974), Major League Baseball player
- Paul Caraway (1905–1985), United States Army lieutenant general
- Thaddeus H. Caraway (1871–1931), United States representative and senator from Arkansas
