= Cedar Creek (Uwharrie River tributary) =

Stream in North Carolina, USA

Cedar Creek Tributary to Uwharrie River
- Location of Cedar Creek mouth Cedar Creek (Uwharrie River tributary) (the United States)

Location
- Country: United States
- State: North Carolina
- County: Montgomery

Physical characteristics
- Source: Rocky Creek divide
  - location: about 3 miles southeast of Uwharrie, North Carolina
  - coordinates: 35°23′28″N 079°58′41″W
  - elevation: 710 ft (220 m)
- Mouth: Uwharrie River
  - location: about 2 miles southwest of Uwharrie, North Carolina
  - coordinates: 35°23′41″N 080°01′15″W
  - elevation: 289 ft (88 m)
- Length: 2.72 mi (4.38 km)
- Basin size: 5.32 square miles (13.8 km^{2})
- Discharge
  - location: Uwharrie River
  - average: 6.51 cu ft/s (0.184 m^{3}/s) at mouth with Uwharrie River

Basin features
- Progression: Uwharrie River → Pee Dee River → Winyah Bay → Atlantic Ocean
- River system: Pee Dee
- Tributaries
  - left: Watery Branch
- Bridges: River Road

Cedar Creek is a 2.72 mi (4.38 km) long 2nd order tributary to the Uwharrie River, in Montgomery County, North Carolina.

== Course ==
Cedar Creek rises on the Rocky Creek divide about 3 miles southeast of Uwharrie in Montgomery County, North Carolina. Cedar Creek then flows generally west to meet the Uwharrie River about 2 miles southwest of Uwharrie.

== Watershed ==
Cedar Creek Creek drains 5.32 square miles (13.8 km^{2}) of area, receives about 47.9 in/year of precipitation, has a topographic wetness index of 339.72 and is about 92% forested.

== See also ==
- List of rivers of North Carolina
