= Faulkner House =

Faulkner House may refer to:

- Barrett-Faulkner House
- Falcon Rest, also known as the Clay Faulkner House
- Faulkner House (Acton, Massachusetts)
- Faulkner House (Charlottesville, Virginia)
- George Washington Faulkner House
- Rowan Oak, home of author William Faulkner
