= Beaverdam Creek (Lanes Creek tributary) =

Stream in North Carolina, USA

Beaverdam Creek Tributary to Lanes Creek
- Location of Beaverdam Creek mouth Beaverdam Creek (Lanes Creek tributary) (the United States)

Location
- Country: United States
- State: North Carolina
- County: Union

Physical characteristics
- Source: Rays Fork divide
  - location: about 3 miles south of Wingate, North Carolina
  - coordinates: 34°55′25″N 080°26′41″W
  - elevation: 612 ft (187 m)
- Mouth: Lanes Creek
  - location: about 2.5 miles southeast of Marshville, North Carolina
  - coordinates: 34°57′53″N 080°18′34″W
  - elevation: 398 ft (121 m)
- Length: 11.96 mi (19.25 km)
- Basin size: 18.34 square miles (47.5 km^{2})
- Discharge
  - location: Lanes Creek
  - average: 21.21 cu ft/s (0.601 m^{3}/s) at mouth with Lanes Creek

Basin features
- Progression: Lanes Creek → Rocky River → Pee Dee River → Winyah Bay → Atlantic Ocean
- River system: Pee Dee River
- Tributaries
  - left: Reedy Branch; Maple Springs Branch
  - right: Haney Branch
- Bridges: White Store Road, Snyder Store Road, Russell Pope Road, Camden Road, Gilboa Road, Old Pagelane-Marshville Road, Blair Road, Landsford Road

Beaverdam Creek is a 11.96 mi (19.25 km) long 3rd order tributary to Lanes Creek in Union County, North Carolina.

== Course ==
Beaverdam Creek rises in a pond about 3 miles south of Wingate, North Carolina. Beaverdam Creek then flows northeast to meet Lanes Creek about 2.5 miles southeast of Marshville.

== Watershed ==
Beaverdam Creek drains 18.34 square miles (47.5 km^{2}) of area, receives about 48.3 in/year of precipitation, has a topographic wetness index of 439.41 and is about 37% forested.
