= Dutchmans Creek (Uwharrie River tributary) =

Stream in North Carolina, USA

Dutchmans Creek Tributary to Uwharrie River
- Location of Dutchmans Creek mouth Dutchmans Creek (Uwharrie River tributary) (the United States)

Location
- Country: United States
- State: North Carolina
- County: Montgomery

Physical characteristics
- Source: Lick Fork divide
  - location: about 0.25 miles northwest of Liberty, North Carolina
  - coordinates: 35°20′27″N 080°00′01″W
  - elevation: 635 ft (194 m)
- Mouth: Uwharrie River
  - location: about 1.5 miles north of Lake in the Pine
  - coordinates: 35°23′11″N 080°02′29″W
  - elevation: 285 ft (87 m)
- Length: 4.94 mi (7.95 km)
- Basin size: 3.99 square miles (10.3 km^{2})
- Discharge
  - location: Uwharrie River
  - average: 4.48 cu ft/s (0.127 m^{3}/s) at mouth with Uwharrie River

Basin features
- Progression: Uwharrie River → Pee Dee River → Winyah Bay → Atlantic Ocean
- River system: Pee Dee
- Tributaries
  - left: unnamed tributaries
  - right: unnamed tributaries
- Bridges: River Road

Dutchmans Creek is a 4.94 mi (7.95 km) long 1st order tributary to the Uwharrie River, in Montgomery County, North Carolina.

== Course ==
Dutchmans Creek rises on the Lick Fork divide about 0.25 miles northwest of Liberty Hill in Montgomery County, North Carolina. Dutchmans Creek then flows northwest to meet the Uwharrie River about 1.5 miles north of Lake in the Pine.

== Watershed ==
Dutchmans Creek Creek drains 3.99 square miles (10.3 km^{2}) of area, receives about 48.0 in/year of precipitation, has a topographic wetness index of 330.89 and is about 93% forested.

== See also ==
- List of rivers of North Carolina
