= Little Brown Creek (Brown Creek tributary, left bank) =

Stream in North Carolina, USA

Little Brown Creek Tributary to Brown Creek on the left bank
- Location of Little Brown Creek mouth Little Brown Creek (Brown Creek tributary, left bank) (the United States)

Location
- Country: United States
- State: North Carolina
- County: Union

Physical characteristics
- Source: divide between Little Brown Creek and Lanes Creek
  - location: pond about 8 miles south of Marshville, North Carolina
  - coordinates: 34°51′31″N 080°22′51″W
  - elevation: 538 ft (164 m)
- Mouth: Brown Creek
  - location: about 8 miles south-southeast of Marshville, North Carolina
  - coordinates: 34°50′08″N 080°20′34″W
  - elevation: 344 ft (105 m)
- Length: 3.43 mi (5.52 km)
- Basin size: 6.39 square miles (16.6 km^{2})
- Discharge
  - location: Brown Creek
  - average: 7.48 cu ft/s (0.212 m^{3}/s) at mouth with Brown Creek

Basin features
- Progression: southeast
- River system: Pee Dee River
- Tributaries
  - left: Wallace Branch
  - right: unnamed tributaries
- Bridges: Landsford Road, Zion Church Road

Little Brown Creek is a 3.43 mi (5.52 km) long, third-order tributary to Brown Creek in Union County, North Carolina. Located on the left bank of Brown Creek, this creek is distinct from another on the right bank downstream.

== Course ==
Little Brown Creek originates approximately 8 miles south of Marshville, North Carolina, and flows southeast to its confluence with Brown Creek, about 8 miles south-southeast of Marshville, North Carolina.

== Watershed ==
Little Brown Creek drains an area of 6.39 square miles (16.6 km^{2}), receives approximately 48.4 inches of precipitation annually, has a topographic wetness index of 426.99, and is about 42% forested.
