= Barkers Branch (Lanes Creek tributary) =

Stream in North Carolina, USA

Barkers Branch Tributary to Lanes Creek
- Location of Barkers Branch mouth Barkers Branch (Lanes Creek tributary) (the United States)

Location
- Country: United States
- State: North Carolina
- County: Union

Physical characteristics
- Source: Cedar Branch divide
  - location: about 0.25 miles northeast of Allens Crossroads, North Carolina
  - coordinates: 34°55′13″N 080°23′56″W
  - elevation: 572 ft (174 m)
- Mouth: Lanes Creek
  - location: about 2 miles north of Sturdivants Crossroads, North Carolina
  - coordinates: 34°55′51″N 080°20′07″W
  - elevation: 418 ft (127 m)
- Length: 4.51 mi (7.26 km)
- Basin size: 2.76 square miles (7.1 km^{2})
- Discharge
  - location: Lanes Creek
  - average: 3.39 cu ft/s (0.096 m^{3}/s) at mouth with Lanes Creek

Basin features
- Progression: Lanes Creek → Rocky River → Pee Dee River → Winyah Bay → Atlantic Ocean
- River system: Pee Dee River
- Tributaries
  - left: unnamed tributaries
  - right: unnamed tributaries
- Bridges: Ajars Road, Camden Road, Baron Greene Road, Tanner Road, Philadelphia Church Road, Landsford Road

Barkers Branch is a 4.51 mi (7.26 km) long 1st order tributary to Lanes Creek in Union County, North Carolina.

== Course ==
Barkers Branch rises about 0.25 miles northeast of Allens Crossroads, North Carolina. Barkers Branch then flows northeast and then turns east to meet Lanes Creek about 2 miles north of Sturdivants Crossroads, North Carolina.

== Watershed ==
Barkers Branch drains 2.76 square miles (7.1 km^{2}) of area, receives about 48.2 in/year of precipitation, has a topographic wetness index of 434.32 and is about 38% forested.
