= Crow Creek (Uwharrie River tributary) =

Stream in North Carolina, USA

Crow Creek Tributary to Uwharrie River
- Location of Crow Creek mouth Crow Creek (Uwharrie River tributary) (the United States)

Location
- Country: United States
- State: North Carolina
- County: Randolph; Montgomery

Physical characteristics
- Source: Laniers Creek divide
  - location: about 1 mile west of New Hope, North Carolina
  - coordinates: 35°33′09″N 080°02′12″W
  - elevation: 665 ft (203 m)
- Mouth: Uwharrie River
  - location: about 0.75 miles northeast of Coggins Mine, North Carolina
  - coordinates: 35°29′46″N 080°00′16″W
  - elevation: 351 ft (107 m)
- Length: 5.22 mi (8.40 km)
- Basin size: 10.14 square miles (26.3 km^{2})
- Discharge
  - location: Uwharrie River
  - average: 12.02 cu ft/s (0.340 m^{3}/s) at mouth with Uwharrie River

Basin features
- Progression: Uwharrie River → Pee Dee River → Winyah Bay → Atlantic Ocean
- River system: Pee Dee River
- Tributaries
  - left: unnamed tributaries
  - right: Wallace Branch; Big Creek
- Bridges: Hogan Farm Trail, Crow Creek Road, Bells Grove Road, New Hope Road

Crow Creek is a 5.22 mi (8.40 km) long 3rd order tributary to the Uwharrie River in Montgomery County, North Carolina.

== Course ==
Crow Creek rises on the Laniers Creek divide in Randolph County about 1 mile west of New Hope, North Carolina. Crow Creek then flows southeast into Montgomery County to join the Uwharrie River about 0.75 miles northeast of Coggins Mine.

== Watershed ==
Crow Creek drains 10.14 square miles (26.3 km^{2}) of area, receives about 47.4 in/year of precipitation, has a wetness index of 377.59 and is about 65% forested.

== See also ==
- List of rivers of North Carolina
