= Waxhaw Branch =

Stream in North Carolina, USA

Waxhaw Branch Tributary to Lanes Creek
- Location of Waxhaw Branch mouth Waxhaw Branch (the United States)

Location
- Country: United States
- State: North Carolina
- County: Union

Physical characteristics
- Source: Rays Fork divide
  - location: about 5 miles southeast of Rock Rest, North Carolina
  - coordinates: 34°55′27″N 080°26′58″W
  - elevation: 598 ft (182 m)
- Mouth: Lanes Creek
  - location: about 1.5 miles southeast of Allens Crossroads, North Carolina
  - coordinates: 34°53′26″N 080°23′30″W
  - elevation: 448 ft (137 m)
- Length: 5.61 mi (9.03 km)
- Basin size: 6.66 square miles (17.2 km^{2})
- Discharge
  - location: Lanes Creek
  - average: 8.02 cu ft/s (0.227 m^{3}/s) at mouth with Lanes Creek

Basin features
- Progression: Lanes Creek → Rocky River → Pee Dee River → Winyah Bay → Atlantic Ocean
- River system: Pee Dee River
- Tributaries
  - left: unnamed tributaries
  - right: unnamed tributaries
- Bridges: Snyder Store Road, Belk Mill Road, Old Pageland Marshvile Road

Waxhaw Branch is a 5.61 mi (9.03 km) long 2nd order tributary to Lanes Creek in Union County, North Carolina. This is the only stream of this name in the United States.

== Course ==
Waxhaw Branch rises about 5 miles southeast of Rock Rest, North Carolina. Waxhaw Branch then flows generally southeast with curves to meet Lanes Creek about 1.5 miles southeast of Allens Crossroads, North Carolina.

== Watershed ==
Waxhaw Branch drains 6.66 square miles (17.2 km^{2}) of area, receives about 48.4 in/year of precipitation, has a topographic wetness index of 430.40 and is about 42% forested.
