= Cool Spring Branch (Lanes Creek tributary) =

Stream in North Carolina, US

Cool Spring Branch Tributary to Lanes Creek
- Location of Cool Spring Branch mouth Cool Spring Branch (Lanes Creek tributary) (the United States)

Location
- Country: United States
- State: North Carolina
- County: Union

Physical characteristics
- Source: Brown Creek divide
  - location: about 3 miles southwest of Sturdivants Crossroads, North Carolina
  - coordinates: 34°52′34″N 080°20′14″W
  - elevation: 508 ft (155 m)
- Mouth: Lanes Creek
  - location: about 0.5 miles northwest of Sturdivants Crossroads, North Carolina
  - coordinates: 34°54′57″N 080°20′39″W
  - elevation: 425 ft (130 m)
- Length: 3.22 mi (5.18 km)
- Basin size: 2.69 square miles (7.0 km^{2})
- Discharge
  - location: Lanes Creek
  - average: 3.26 cu ft/s (0.092 m^{3}/s) at mouth with Lanes Creek

Basin features
- Progression: Lanes Creek → Rocky River → Pee Dee River → Winyah Bay → Atlantic Ocean
- River system: Pee Dee River
- Tributaries
  - left: unnamed tributaries
  - right: unnamed tributaries
- Bridges: Landsford Road, Leonard Morgan Road, White Store Road

Cool Spring Branch is a 3.22 mi (5.18 km) long 1st order tributary to Lanes Creek in Union County, North Carolina.

== Course ==
Cool Spring Branch rises about 3 miles southwest of Sturdivants Crossroads, North Carolina. Cool Spring Branch then flows north to meet Lanes Creek about 0.5 miles northwest of Sturdivants Crossroads, North Carolina.

== Watershed ==
Cool Spring Branch drains 2.69 square miles (7.0 km^{2}) of area, receives about 48.2 in/year of precipitation, has a topographic wetness index of 459.90 and is about 35% forested.
