= Carolina Creek (Lanes Creek tributary) =

Stream in North Carolina, USA

Carolina Creek Tributary to Lanes Creek
- Location of Carolina Creek mouth Carolina Creek (Lanes Creek tributary) (the United States)

Location
- Country: United States
- State: North Carolina
- County: Union

Physical characteristics
- Source: Brown Creek divide
  - location: pond about 0.5 miles east of Mt. Pisgah Church, just north of South Carolina state line.
  - coordinates: 34°48′59″N 080°24′33″W
  - elevation: 581 ft (177 m)
- Mouth: Lanes Creek
  - location: about 5 miles south of Allens Crossroads, North Carolina
  - coordinates: 34°52′08″N 080°24′09″W
  - elevation: 458 ft (140 m)
- Length: 4.74 mi (7.63 km)
- Basin size: 3.39 square miles (8.8 km^{2})
- Discharge
  - location: Lanes Creek
  - average: 4.04 cu ft/s (0.114 m^{3}/s) at mouth with Lanes Creek

Basin features
- Progression: Lanes Creek → Rocky River → Pee Dee River → Winyah Bay → Atlantic Ocean
- River system: Pee Dee River
- Tributaries
  - left: unnamed tributaries
  - right: unnamed tributaries
- Bridges: Vann Snead Road, Landsford Road, Old Pageland Marshville Road

Carolina Creek is a 4.74 mi (7.63 km) long 1st order tributary to Lanes Creek in Union County, North Carolina.

== Course ==
Carolina Creek rises in a pond about 0.5 miles east of Mt. Pisgah Church, just north of the South Carolina state line. Carolina Creek then flows north to meet Lanes Creek about 5 miles south of Allens Crossroads, North Carolina.

== Watershed ==
Carolina Creek drains 3.39 square miles (8.8 km^{2}) of area, receives about 48.5 in/year of precipitation, has a topographic wetness index of 476.70 and is about 43% forested.
