= Islay Walden =

American poet, teacher, and minister (1847–1884)

Alfred Islay Walden (1847–1884) was an American poet, teacher, and minister. He was born in Randolph County, North Carolina and enslaved. He was freed after the American Civil War and studied at Howard University with the intent to become a teacher. Margo Lee Williams wrote a book about him.

He had poor vision. He studied at the New Brunswick Theological Seminary. He published two volumes of poetry. He returned to Randolph County and established a church in Hill Town. He taught at the church on Sundays.

== Writings ==
- Walden's Miscellaneous Poems Which the Author Desires to Dedicate to the Cause of Education and Humanity, 1873
- Walden's Sacred Poems with a Sketch of His Life, Hosford, North Carolina 1877
