= Wicker Branch (Lanes Creek tributary) =

Stream in North Carolina, USA

Wicker Branch Tributary to Lanes Creek
- Location of Wicker Branch mouth Wicker Branch (Lanes Creek tributary) (the United States)

Location
- Country: United States
- State: North Carolina
- County: Union

Physical characteristics
- Source: Buck Branch divide
  - location: pond about 5 miles east-northeast of Alton, North Carolina
  - coordinates: 34°53′44″N 080°29′02″W
  - elevation: 638 ft (194 m)
- Mouth: Lanes Creek
  - location: about 6 miles south of Allens Crossroads, North Carolina
  - coordinates: 34°51′53″N 080°25′12″W
  - elevation: 471 ft (144 m)
- Length: 5.22 mi (8.40 km)
- Basin size: 9.36 square miles (24.2 km^{2})
- Discharge
  - location: Lanes Creek
  - average: 11.10 cu ft/s (0.314 m^{3}/s) at mouth with Lanes Creek

Basin features
- Progression: Lanes Creek → Rocky River → Pee Dee River → Winyah Bay → Atlantic Ocean
- River system: Pee Dee River
- Tributaries
  - left: Mountain Springs Branch
  - right: Cowpens Branch
- Bridges: Medlin Road, US 601, Belk Mill Road

Wicker Branch is a 5.22 mi (8.40 km) long 3rd order tributary to Lanes Creek in Union County, North Carolina.

== Course ==
Wicker Branch rises in a pond about 5 miles east-northeast of Alton, North Carolina. Wicker Branch then flows southeast to meet Lanes Creek about 6 miles south of Allens Crossroads, North Carolina.

== Watershed ==
Wicker Branch drains 9.36 square miles (24.2 km^{2}) of area, receives about 48.4 in/year of precipitation, has a topographic wetness index of 434.25 and is about 38% forested.
