= Caraway Mountains =

Mountain range in North Carolina, U.S.

Coordinates: 35.751°N 79.889°W

The Caraway Mountains are a mountain range located in western Randolph County and a section of eastern Davidson County, North Carolina. The mountains are located between the cities of Asheboro and Lexington and are bisected by US Highway 64. The mountains are known for their rugged and steep terrain and rise to over 1,000 feet (300 m). Typically the Caraways are said to be a part of the Uwharrie Mountains and make up the northern extent of this range. They extend from roughly south of High Point and transition into the Uwharries, stretching roughly 30 miles (48 km). The range is only about 10 miles (16 km) wide.

The range takes its name from Caraway Creek, which was named after a Native American tribe, the Keyauwee Indians, who lived in the area before European settlement. The area was once a highly used Indian trading area and many early settlers noted that the Indian trading paths tended to "disappear" into the mountains. Prominent peaks in the area are Caraway Mountain, Back Creek Mountain, Daves Mountain, Ridges Mountain, and Mount Shepherd, the latter at 1,150 feet (350 m) being the highest point in Randolph County. Its foothills are in Chatham County.
