= Hannahs Creek (Uwharrie River tributary) =

Stream in North Carolina, USA

Hannahs Creek Tributary to Uwharrie River
- Location of Hannahs Creek mouth Hannahs Creek (Uwharrie River tributary) (the United States)

Location
- Country: United States
- State: North Carolina
- County: Randolph

Physical characteristics
- Source: confluence of South Prong and North Prong Hannahs Creek
  - location: south end of Birkhead Mountain Wilderness of Uwharrie National Forest
  - coordinates: 35°34′40″N 079°55′51″W
  - elevation: 530 ft (160 m)
- Mouth: Uwharrie River
  - location: about 4 miles southeast of Martha, North Carolina
  - coordinates: 35°34′40″N 079°55′51″W
  - elevation: 371 ft (113 m)
- Length: 3.14 mi (5.05 km)
- Basin size: 8.41 square miles (21.8 km^{2})
- Discharge
  - location: Uwharrie River
  - average: 9.95 cu ft/s (0.282 m^{3}/s) at mouth with Uwharrie River

Basin features
- Progression: Uwharrie River → Pee Dee River → Winyah Bay → Atlantic Ocean
- River system: Pee Dee
- Tributaries
  - left: South Prong Hannahs Creek
  - right: North Prong Hannahs Creek; Robbins Branch
- Bridges: Lassister Mill Road

Hannahs Creek is a 3.14 mi (5.05 km) long 3rd order tributary to the Uwharrie River, in Randolph County, North Carolina.

== Course ==
Hannahs Creek forms at the confluence of South and North Prong Hannahs Creek at the south end of the Birkhead Mountain Wilderness in Randolph County, North Carolina. Hannahs Creek then flows west to meet the Uwharrie River about 4 miles southeast of Martha.

== Watershed ==
Hannahs Creek drains 8.41 square miles (21.8 km^{2}) of area, receives about 47.1 in/year of precipitation, has a topographic wetness index of 334.41 and is about 91% forested.

== See also ==
- List of rivers of North Carolina
