= Cedar Branch (Lanes Creek tributary) =

Stream in North Carolina, USA

Cedar Branch Tributary to Lanes Creek
- Location of Cedar Branch mouth Cedar Branch (Lanes Creek tributary) (the United States)

Location
- Country: United States
- State: North Carolina
- County: Union

Physical characteristics
- Source: Barkers Branch divide
  - location: Allens Crossroads, North Carolina
  - coordinates: 34°55′00″N 080°24′04″W
  - elevation: 576 ft (176 m)
- Mouth: Lanes Creek
  - location: about 1.5 miles southeast of Allens Crossroads, North Carolina
  - coordinates: 34°54′17″N 080°22′38″W
  - elevation: 439 ft (134 m)
- Length: 1.75 mi (2.82 km)
- Basin size: 0.86 square miles (2.2 km^{2})
- Discharge
  - location: Lanes Creek
  - average: 1.12 cu ft/s (0.032 m^{3}/s) at mouth with Lanes Creek

Basin features
- Progression: Lanes Creek → Rocky River → Pee Dee River → Winyah Bay → Atlantic Ocean
- River system: Pee Dee River
- Tributaries
  - left: unnamed tributaries
  - right: unnamed tributaries
- Bridges: Ajars Road

Cedar Branch is a 1.75 mi (2.82 km) long 1st order tributary to Lanes Creek in Union County, North Carolina.

== Course ==
Cedar Branch rises at Allens Crossroads, North Carolina. Cedar Branch then flows southeast to meet Lanes Creek about 1.5 miles southeast of Allens Crossroads, North Carolina.

== Watershed ==
Cedar Branch drains 0.86 square miles (2.2 km^{2}) of area, receives about 48.3 in/year of precipitation, has a topographic wetness index of 420.97 and is about 48% forested.
