= Laniers Creek =

Stream in North Carolina, USA

Laniers Creek Tributary to Uwharrie River
- Location of Laniers Creek mouth Laniers Creek (the United States)

Location
- Country: United States
- State: North Carolina
- County: Randolph

Physical characteristics
- Source: Cabin Creek divide
  - location: pond at Complex, North Carolina
  - coordinates: 35°33′56″N 080°03′52″W
  - elevation: 705 ft (215 m)
- Mouth: Uwharrie River
  - location: about 1.5 miles east of New Hope, North Carolina
  - coordinates: 35°33′27″N 079°58′37″W
  - elevation: 367 ft (112 m)
- Length: 5.99 mi (9.64 km)
- Basin size: 9.75 square miles (25.3 km^{2})
- Discharge
  - location: Uwharrie River
  - average: 11.53 cu ft/s (0.326 m^{3}/s) at mouth with Uwharrie River

Basin features
- Progression: Uwharrie River → Pee Dee River → Winyah Bay → Atlantic Ocean
- River system: Pee Dee River
- Tributaries
  - left: Sand Branch
  - right: Nanny Branch
- Bridges: Surratt Country Road, Johnson Farm Road, New Hope Road, Lou Cranford Road

Laniers Creek is a 5.99 mi (9.64 km) long 2nd order tributary to the Uwharrie River in Randolph County, North Carolina. This is the only stream of this name in the United States.

== Course ==
Laniers Creek rises in a pond on the Cabin Creek divide at Complex, North Carolina. Laniers Creek then flows easterly to join the Uwharrie River about 1.5 miles east of New Hope.

== Watershed ==
Laniers Creek drains 9.75 square miles (25.3 km^{2}) of area, receives about 47.1 in/year of precipitation, has a wetness index of 398.45 and is about 39% forested.

== See also ==
- List of rivers of North Carolina
