= Toms Creek (Uwharrie River tributary) =

Stream in North Carolina, USA

Toms Creek Tributary to Uwharrie River
- Location of Toms Creek mouth Toms Creek (Uwharrie River tributary) (the United States)

Location
- Country: United States
- State: North Carolina
- County: Randolph

Physical characteristics
- Source: Cabin Creek divide
  - location: pond about 1.5 miles southeast of Denton, North Carolina
  - coordinates: 35°36′30″N 080°05′52″W
  - elevation: 670 ft (200 m)
- Mouth: Uwharrie River
  - location: about 2 miles southeast of Farmer, North Carolina
  - coordinates: 35°37′27″N 079°57′23″W
  - elevation: 388 ft (118 m)
- Length: 12.51 mi (20.13 km)
- Basin size: 17.77 square miles (46.0 km^{2})
- Discharge
  - location: Uwharrie River
  - average: 20.35 cu ft/s (0.576 m^{3}/s) at mouth with Uwharrie River

Basin features
- Progression: Uwharrie River → Pee Dee River → Winyah Bay → Atlantic Ocean
- River system: Pee Dee River
- Tributaries
  - left: unnamed tributaries
  - right: unnamed tributaries
- Bridges: Piedmont School Road, NC 47, Brantley Gordon Road, Richey Road, Old NC 49, NC 49

Toms Creek is a 12.51 mi (20.13 km) long 3rd order tributary to the Uwharrie River in Randolph County, North Carolina.

== Variant names ==
According to the Geographic Names Information System, it has also been known historically as:

- Mill Creek
- Tom Creek

== Course ==
Toms Creek rises in a pond on the Cabin Creek divide in Davidson County, about 1.5 miles southeast of Denton, North Carolina. Toms Creek then flows northeast into Randolph County and makes a turn to the southeast to join the Uwharrie River about 2 miles southeast of Farmer, North Carolina.

== Watershed ==
Toms Creek drains 17.77 square miles (46.0 km^{2}) of area, receives about 46.5 in/year of precipitation, has a wetness index of 392.78 and is about 59% forested.
