= Norkett Branch =

Stream in North Carolina, USA

Norkett Branch Tributary to Lanes Creek
- Location of Norkett Branch mouth Norkett Branch (the United States)

Location
- Country: United States
- State: North Carolina
- County: Union

Physical characteristics
- Source: Little Brown Creek divide
  - location: about 4 miles southwest of Sturdivants Crossroads, North Carolina
  - coordinates: 34°51′57″N 080°21′22″W
  - elevation: 491 ft (150 m)
- Mouth: Lanes Creek
  - location: about 1 mile northwest of Sturdivants Crossroads, North Carolina
  - coordinates: 34°54′49″N 080°21′07″W
  - elevation: 428 ft (130 m)
- Length: 4.21 mi (6.78 km)
- Basin size: 4.91 square miles (12.7 km^{2})
- Discharge
  - location: Lanes Creek
  - average: 5.82 cu ft/s (0.165 m^{3}/s) at mouth with Lanes Creek

Basin features
- Progression: Lanes Creek → Rocky River → Pee Dee River → Winyah Bay → Atlantic Ocean
- River system: Pee Dee River
- Tributaries
  - left: unnamed tributaries
  - right: unnamed tributaries
- Bridges: Landsford Road, Leonard Morgan Road, White Store Road

Norkett Branch is a 4.21 mi (6.78 km) long 2nd order tributary to Lanes Creek in Union County, North Carolina. This is the only stream of this name in the United States.

== Course ==
Norkett Branch rises about 4 miles southwest of Sturdivants Crossroads, North Carolina. Norkett Branch then flows generally north with curves to meet Lanes Creek about 1 mile northwest of Sturdivants Crossroads, North Carolina.

== Watershed ==
Norkett Branch drains 4.91 square miles (12.7 km^{2}) of area, receives about 48.3 in/year of precipitation, has a topographic wetness index of 465.89 and is about 40% forested.
