= Barrett-Faulkner House =

Historic house in North Carolina, United States

- U.S. National Register of Historic Places
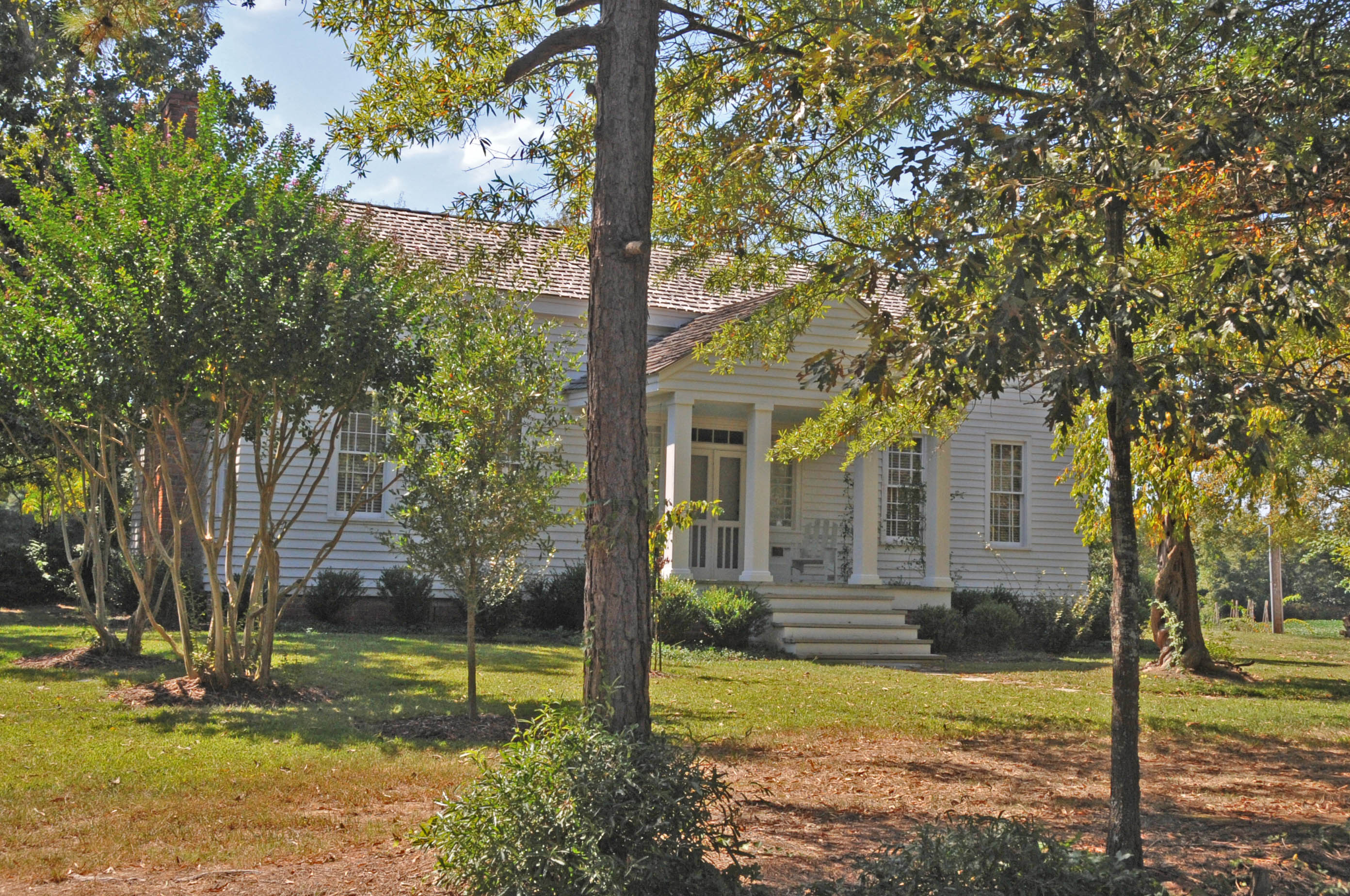
- Barrett-Faulkner House, March 2007

- Location within North Carolina Location within the United States
- Location: 2063 Monroe-White Store Rd., near Peachland, North Carolina
- Coordinates: 34°54′19″N 80°18′25″W
- Area: 5.3 acres (2.1 ha)
- Built: c. 1847
- Architectural style: Greek Revival
- NRHP reference No.: 12000601
- Added to NRHP: September 4, 2012

Barrett-Faulkner House is a historic home located near Peachland, Anson County, North Carolina. It dates to the early-19th century and was remodeled in 1847 in the Greek Revival style. The house is a 1 1/2-story, dogtrot plan frame dwelling, five bays wide, with a single-pile main block.

It was listed on the National Register of Historic Places in 2012.
