= Horsepen Creek (Uwharrie River tributary) =

Stream in North Carolina, USA

Horsepen Creek Tributary to Uwharrie River
- Location of Horsepen Creek mouth Horsepen Creek (Uwharrie River tributary) (the United States)

Location
- Country: United States
- State: North Carolina
- County: Montgomery

Physical characteristics
- Source: Reeves Spring Branch divide
  - location: about 1 mile west of Coggins Mine, North Carolina
  - coordinates: 35°29′18″N 080°02′15″W
  - elevation: 592 ft (180 m)
- Mouth: Uwharrie River
  - location: about 1 mile southeast of Coggins Mine, North Carolina
  - coordinates: 35°28′50″N 080°00′44″W
  - elevation: 329 ft (100 m)
- Length: 2.22 mi (3.57 km)
- Basin size: 1.29 square miles (3.3 km^{2})
- Discharge
  - location: Uwharrie River
  - average: 1.66 cu ft/s (0.047 m^{3}/s) at mouth with Uwharrie River

Basin features
- Progression: Uwharrie River → Pee Dee River → Winyah Bay → Atlantic Ocean
- River system: Pee Dee River
- Tributaries
  - left: unnamed tributaries
  - right: unnamed tributaries
- Bridges: Coggins Mine Road

Horsepen Creek is a 2.22 mi (3.57 km) long 1st order tributary to the Uwharrie River in Montgomery County, North Carolina.

== Course ==
Horsepen Creek rises on the Reeves Spring Branch divide in Montgomery County about 1 mile west of Coggins Mine, North Carolina. Horsepen Creek then flows southeast and joins the Uwharrie River about 1 mile southeast of Coggins Mine.

== Watershed ==
Horsepen Creek drains 1.29 square miles (3.3 km^{2}) of area, receives about 47.6 in/year of precipitation, has a wetness index of 333.64 and is about 94% forested.

== See also ==
- List of rivers of North Carolina
