= Taylors Creek (Canoochee Creek tributary) =

Main tributary to Canoochee Creek

Coordinates: 32°0′19.73″N 81°44′24.41″W

Taylors Creek is a stream in the U.S. state of Georgia. It is the main tributary to Canoochee Creek.

Taylors Creek was named after James and William Taylor, pioneer settlers.

The creek is the namesake for both the ghost town of Taylor's Creek and Taylor's Creek Elementary School.
