= Taylors Creek, Georgia =

Coordinates: 31°56′5.74″N 81°38′56.41″W

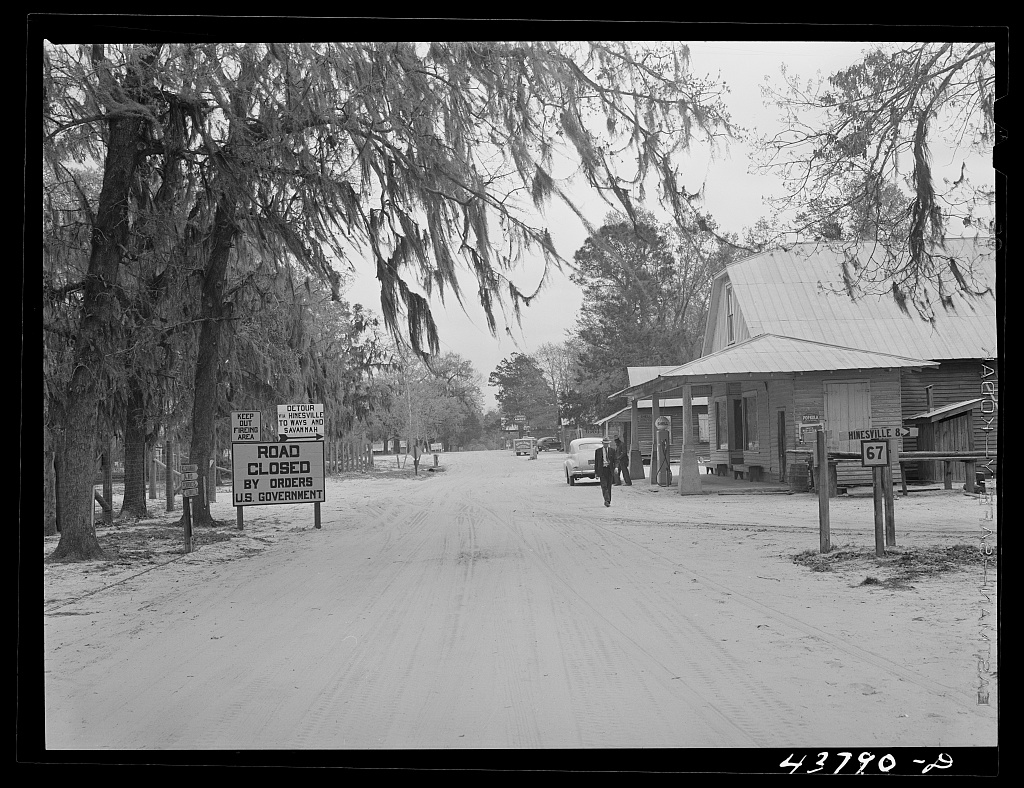
Taylors Creek in April 1941

Taylors Creek is an extinct town in Liberty County, in the U.S. state of Georgia.

== History ==
A post office called Taylor's Creek was established in 1832, and remained in operation until 1941. The community took its name from nearby Taylors Creek.

The hamlet of Taylors Creek disappeared when the town site was seized for the creation of a military installation. Today, the former town site is within the borders of Fort Stewart.
