= Crows Creek =

Stream in the U.S. state of Missouri

Coordinates: 38°08′23″N 91°08′16″W

Crows Creek is a stream in Crawford and Washington counties in the U.S. state of Missouri. It is a tributary of the Meramec River.

The stream headwaters are in western Washington County at and its confluence with the Meramec in eastern Crawford County is at .

Crows Creek most likely has the name of a pioneer citizen.

== See also ==
- List of rivers of Missouri
