= Dutch John Creek (Yadkin River tributary) =

Stream in North Carolina, USA

Dutch John Creek Tributary to Yadkin River
- Location of Dutch John Creek mouth Dutch John Creek (Yadkin River tributary) (the United States)

Location
- Country: United States
- State: North Carolina
- County: Montgomery

Physical characteristics
- Source: unnamed tributary to Yadkin River divide
  - location: about 2 miles north of Falls Mountain
  - coordinates: 35°25′21″N 080°03′43″W
  - elevation: 630 ft (190 m)
- Mouth: Yadkin River
  - location: about 4 miles southeast of Badin, North Carolina
  - coordinates: 35°23′15″N 080°03′37″W
  - elevation: 278 ft (85 m)
- Length: 3.18 mi (5.12 km)
- Basin size: 3.26 square miles (8.4 km^{2})
- Discharge
  - location: Yadkin River
  - average: 4.10 cu ft/s (0.116 m^{3}/s) at mouth with Yadkin River

Basin features
- Progression: generally south
- River system: Pee Dee River
- Tributaries
  - left: unnamed tributaries
  - right: unnamed tributaries
- Bridges: Dutch John Road, Green Gap Road

Dutch John Creek is a 3.18 mi (5.12 km) long 2nd order tributary to the Yadkin River in Montgomery County, North Carolina.

== Course ==
Dutch John Creek rises on the divide of an unnamed tributary to the Yadkin River in Montgomery County about 2 miles north of Falls Mountain. Dutch John Creek then takes a southerly course to join the Yadkin River about 4 miles southeast of Badin, North Carolina.

== Watershed ==
Dutch John Creek drains 3.26 square miles (8.4 km^{2}) of area, receives about 48.1 in/year of precipitation, has a wetness index of 279.86 and is about 98% forested.
