= Moccasin Creek (Uwharrie River tributary) =

Stream in North Carolina, USA

Moccasin Creek Tributary to Uwharrie River
- Location of Moccasin Creek mouth Moccasin Creek (Uwharrie River tributary) (the United States)

Location
- Country: United States
- State: North Carolina
- County: Montgomery

Physical characteristics
- Source: Dutch John Creek divide
  - location: about 1.5 miles west of Daniel Mountain
  - coordinates: 35°25′09″N 080°02′57″W
  - elevation: 548 ft (167 m)
- Mouth: Uwharrie River
  - location: about 1 mile northeast of Daniel Mountain
  - coordinates: 35°25′12″N 080°01′24″W
  - elevation: 318 ft (97 m)
- Length: 3.77 mi (6.07 km)
- Basin size: 9.11 square miles (23.6 km^{2})
- Discharge
  - location: Uwharrie River
  - average: 10.92 cu ft/s (0.309 m^{3}/s) at mouth with Uwharrie River

Basin features
- Progression: Uwharrie River → Pee Dee River → Winyah Bay → Atlantic Ocean
- River system: Pee Dee River
- Tributaries
  - left: West Branch; McLeans Creek
  - right: unnamed tributaries
- Bridges: Dutch John Road, Moccasin Creek Road, McLeans Creek Road, Moccasin Creek Road

Moccasin Creek is a 3.77 mi (6.07 km) long 2nd order tributary to the Uwharrie River in Montgomery County, North Carolina.

== Course ==
Moccasin Creek rises on the Dutch John Creek divide in Montgomery County about 1.5 miles west of Daniel Mountain. Moccasin Creek then follows a semi-circular path going northeast then curving south to join the Uwharrie River about 1 mile northeast of Daniel Mountain.

== Watershed ==
Moccasin Creek drains 9.11 square miles (23.6 km^{2}) of area, receives about 47.9 in/year of precipitation, has a wetness index of 314.07 and is about 88% forested.

== See also ==
- List of rivers of North Carolina
