= Lanes Creek (Rocky River tributary) =

Stream in North Carolina, USA

Lanes Creek Tributary to Rocky River
- Location of Lanes Creek mouth

Location
- Country: United States
- State: North Carolina
- Counties: Anson (NC); Union (NC)

Physical characteristics
- Source: divide between Lanes Creek and Little Richardson Creek
  - location: about 1 mile southeast of Alton, North Carolina
  - coordinates: 34°52′28″N 080°31′03″W
  - elevation: 650 ft (200 m)
- Mouth: Rocky River
  - location: about 5 miles northeast of Burnsville, North Carolina
  - coordinates: 35°08′59″N 080°10′44″W
  - elevation: 213 ft (65 m)
- Length: 37.19 mi (59.85 km)
- Basin size: 138.20 square miles (357.9 km^{2})
- Discharge
  - location: Rocky River
  - average: 144.89 cu ft/s (4.103 m^{3}/s) at mouth with Rocky River

Basin features
- Progression: Rocky River → Pee Dee River → Winyah Bay → Atlantic Ocean
- River system: Pee Dee River
- Tributaries
  - left: Gum Log Branch; Wicker Branch; Waxhaw Branch; Cedar Branch; Barkers Branch; Beaverdam Creek; Lick Branch; Wide Mouth Branch; Lacey Branch; Blackwell Branch; Rocky Branch; Big Branch; Canebreak Branch
  - right: Mill Creek; Carolina Creek; Norkett Branch; Cool Spring Branch; Cedar Branch; Deep Bottom Branch
- Bridges: Jack Davis Road, Dudley Road, Stack Road, Medlin Road, Belk Mill Road, US 601, Old Pageland-Monroe Road, Lanes Creek Road, White Store Road, Philadelphia Church Road, Landsford Road, Gilboa Road, Horne Road, Hasty Road, US 74, Smith Road, NC 218, Ponds Mill Road, NC 742, High Rock Crusher Road, Randall Road,

Lanes Creek is a 37.19 mi (59.85 km) long 4th order tributary of the Rocky River in south-central North Carolina that drains Union County, North Carolina, and Anson County, North Carolina.

Lanes Creek rises near Alton, North Carolina in Union County and flows southeast then turns northeast to flow through Anson County to the Rocky River.

== See also ==
- List of North Carolina rivers
