= Peachland, North Carolina =

- Town
- Seal

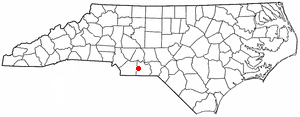
- Location of Peachland, North Carolina
- Coordinates: 34°59′35″N 80°15′57″W
- Country: United States
- State: North Carolina
- County: Anson
- Incorporated: 1895
- Named for: A large peach orchard

Area
  - Total: 1.01 sq mi (2.61 km^{2})
  - Land: 1.01 sq mi (2.61 km^{2})
  - Water: 0 sq mi (0.00 km^{2})
- Elevation: 463 ft (141 m)

Population (2020)
  - Total: 390
  - Density: 386.9/sq mi (149.39/km^{2})
- Time zone: UTC-5 (Eastern (EST))
  - Summer (DST): UTC-4 (EDT)
- ZIP code: 28133
- Area code: 704
- FIPS code: 37-50820
- GNIS feature ID: 2407085
- Website: townofpeachland.org

Peachland is a town in Anson County, North Carolina, United States. The population was 390 at the 2020 census.

== History ==
The Barrett-Faulkner House was listed on the National Register of Historic Places in 2012.

== Geography ==
According to the United States Census Bureau, the town has a total area of 1.0 square mile (2.6 km^{2}), all land.

Peachland is located on U.S. Route 74, a four-lane divided highway that enters the city limits, but bypasses Peachland's business district. Since US 74 does not pass through any business or residential areas, its speed limit is 55 miles per hour (89 km/h) even within the city limits.

== Demographics ==
Historical population
Census	Pop.	Note	%±
1890	58		—
1900	156		169.0%
1910	232		48.7%
1920	196		−15.5%
1930	203		3.6%
1940	390		92.1%
1950	485		24.4%
1960	563		16.1%
1970	556		−1.2%
1980	506		−9.0%
1990	384		−24.1%
2000	554		44.3%
2010	437		−21.1%
2020	390		−10.8%
2021 (est.)	402	▲	3.1%
U.S. Decennial Census

As of the census of 2000, there were 554 people, 198 households, and 152 families residing in the town. The population density was 561.4 inhabitants per square mile (216.8/km^{2}). There were 213 housing units at an average density of 215.8 per square mile (83.3/km^{2}). The racial makeup of the town was 65.88% White, 31.23% African American, 0.54% Native American, 0.18% Pacific Islander, 0.54% from other races, and 1.62% from two or more races. Hispanic or Latino of any race were 1.99% of the population.

There were 198 households, out of which 33.3% had children under the age of 18 living with them, 51.0% were married couples living together, 19.7% had a female householder with no husband present, and 23.2% were non-families. 22.7% of all households were made up of individuals, and 11.1% had someone living alone who was 65 years of age or older. The average household size was 2.80 and the average family size was 3.26.

In the town, the population was spread out, with 28.2% under the age of 18, 8.7% from 18 to 24, 27.6% from 25 to 44, 20.2% from 45 to 64, and 15.3% who were 65 years of age or older. The median age was 34 years. For every 100 females, there were 87.8 males. For every 100 females age 18 and over, there were 93.2 males.

The median income for a household in the town was $28,250, and the median income for a family was $31,923. Males had a median income of $29,773 versus $21,346 for females. The per capita income for the town was $12,607. About 20.7% of families and 26.5% of the population were below the poverty line, including 38.3% of those under age 18 and 11.6% of those age 65 or over.
