= Uwharrie River =

Stream in North Carolina, USA

Uwharrie River Tributary to Pee Dee River
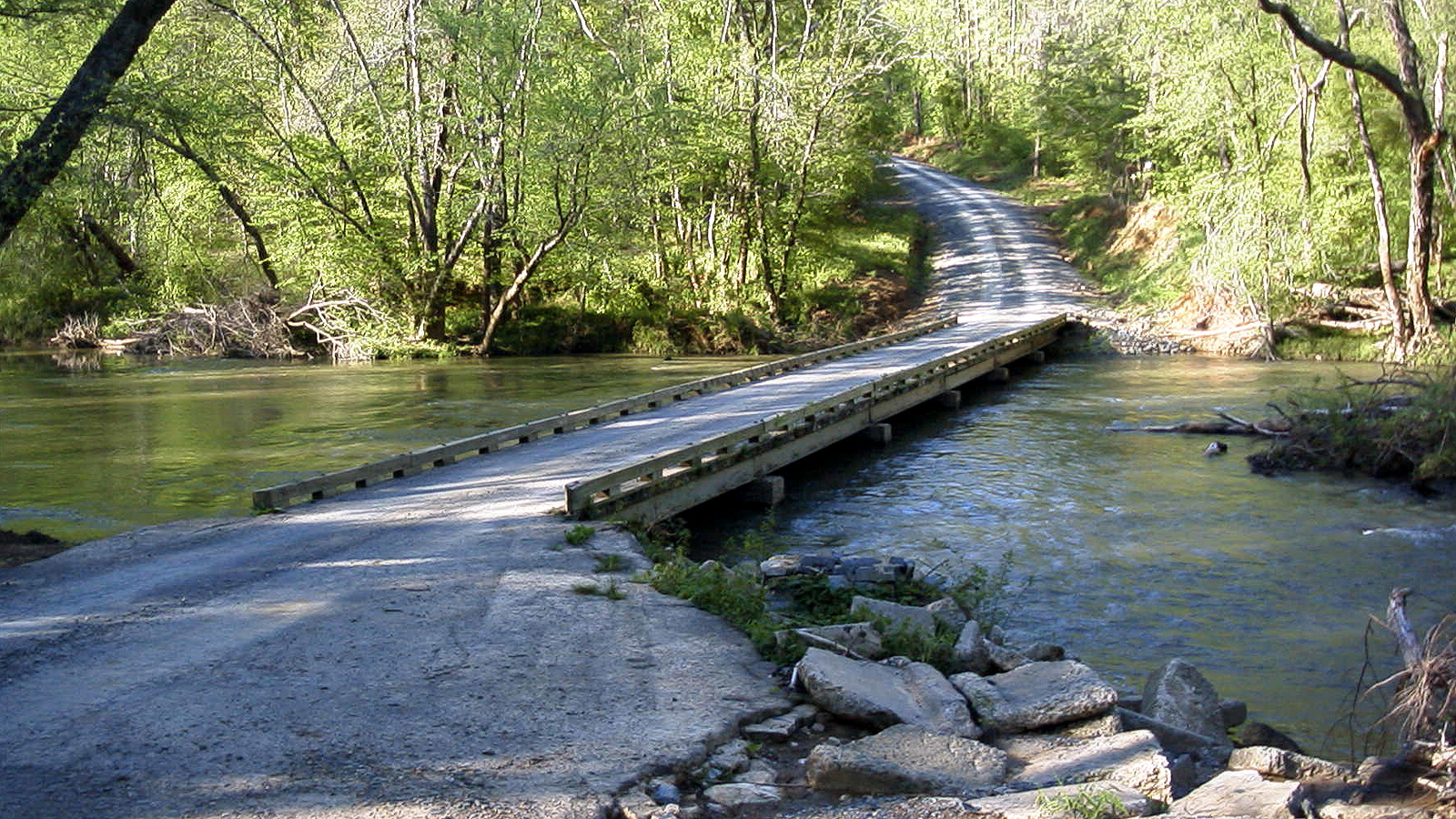
- The Coggins Low-water Bridge over the Uwharrie River.

- Location of Uwharrie River mouth Uwharrie River (the United States)

Location
- Country: United States
- State: North Carolina
- County: Montgomery; Randolph

Physical characteristics
- Source: divide between Uwharrie River and Abbotts Creek
  - location: pond in High Point, North Carolina
  - coordinates: 35°55′15″N 080°01′14″W
  - elevation: 855 ft (261 m)
- Mouth: Pee Dee River
  - location: across river from Morrow Mountain State Park
  - coordinates: 35°22′51″N 080°03′29″W
  - elevation: 272 ft (83 m)
- Length: 61.84 mi (99.52 km)
- Basin size: 387.94 square miles (1,004.8 km^{2})
- Discharge
  - location: Pee Dee River
  - average: 393.64 cu ft/s (11.147 m^{3}/s) at mouth with Pee Dee River

Basin features
- Progression: Pee Dee River → Winyah Bay → Atlantic Ocean
- River system: Pee Dee
- Tributaries
  - left: Caraway Creek; Betty McGees Creek; Silver Run Creek; Hannahs Creek; Mill Creek; Walkers Creek; Lakes Creek; Duncombe Creek; Barnes Creek; Spencer Creek; Hall Branch; Cedar Creek; Dutchmans Creek
  - right: Little Uwharrie River; Jackson Creek; Toms Creek; Second Creek; Twomile Creek; Laniers Creek; Narrows Branch; Crow Creek; Horsepen Creek; Moccasin Creek; Gold Mine Branch
- Bridges: Old Mendenhall Road, Sunset View Drive Ext., Mendenhall Road, Surrett Drive, NC 62, I-85, Meadowbrook Drive, Millers Mill Road, Kennedy Road, Thayer Road, Snyder Country Road, Covered Bridge Road, US 64, Jackson Creek Road, Old NC 49, NC 49, Waynick Meadow Road, High Pine Church Road, Burney Mill Road, Low Water Bridge Road, NC 109,

The Uwharrie River (/uˈwɑːriː/) is a 61.84 mi (99.52 km) long river, in the Piedmont region of central North Carolina in the United States. It is a tributary of the Pee Dee River, which flows to the Atlantic Ocean.

== Course ==
The Uwharrie River rises in northwestern Randolph County, just south of the city of High Point, and flows generally southwardly into northwestern Montgomery County, through the low Uwharrie Mountains and the Uwharrie National Forest. It flows into the Pee Dee River 8 mi (13 km) east of the city of Albemarle as part of the Lake Tillery reservoir, across the Pee Dee from Morrow Mountain State Park. Above the mouth of the Uwharrie, the Pee Dee is known as the Yadkin River.

In its upper course, the Uwharrie collects a minor tributary named the Little Uwharrie River, which flows for a short distance through northwestern Randolph County.

== Variant names ==
The United States Board on Geographic Names settled on Uharie River as the river's name in 1895, and changed it to "Uwharrie River" in 1940. According to the Geographic Names Information System, the Uwharrie River has also been known as:

- Huwaree River
- Uahra River
- Uaree River
- Uharie River
- Uhary River
- Uhwarri River
- Uoharee River
- Uwaree River
- Uwarry River
- Uwharee River
- Uwherrie River
- Voharee River
- Wharee Creek
- Wharie River
- Wharre River

== See also ==
- List of North Carolina rivers
