= Farmer, North Carolina =

- Unincorporated community
- Location of Farmer in North Carolina Farmer, North Carolina (the United States)
- Coordinates: 35°39′12″N 79°58′37″W
- Country: United States
- State: North Carolina
- County: Randolph
- Incorporated: 1897 (inactive)
- Elevation: 538 ft (164 m)
- Time zone: UTC-5 (Eastern (EST))
  - Summer (DST): UTC-4 (EDT)
- Area code: 336
- GNIS feature ID: 1011180
- Other name: Former

Farmer is an unincorporated community in Randolph County, North Carolina, United States.

It is located off NC 49, southwest of the highway's intersection with U.S. 64 in Asheboro.
