= Marshville, North Carolina =

- Town
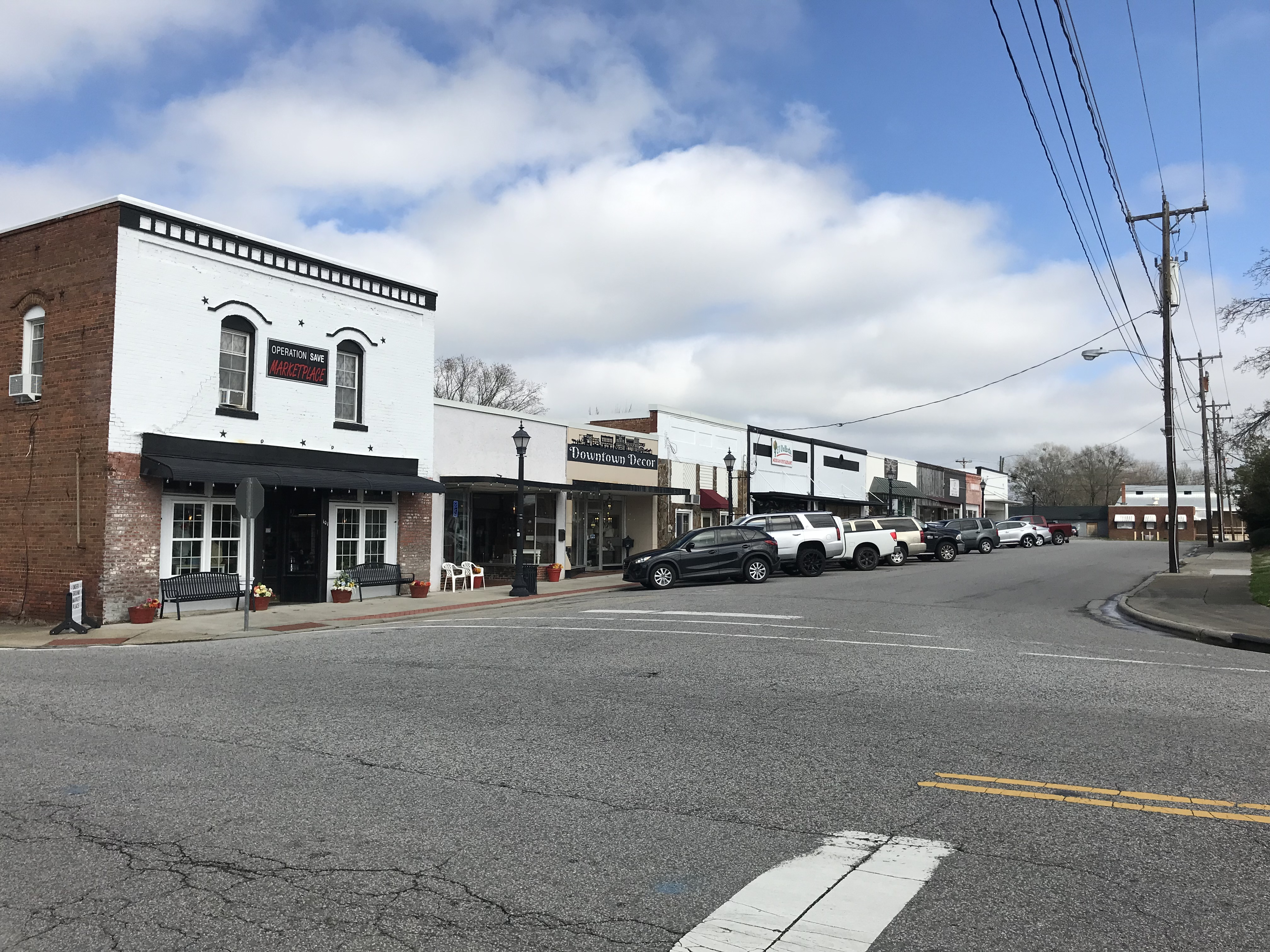
- East Union Street

- Seal

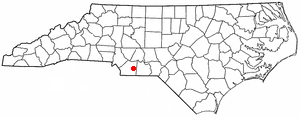
- Location of Marshville, North Carolina
- Coordinates: 34°59′11″N 80°22′06″W
- Country: United States
- State: North Carolina
- County: Union
- Founded: 1874
- Incorporated: 1877
- Named for: The Marsh family

Area
  - Total: 2.13 sq mi (5.51 km^{2})
  - Land: 2.12 sq mi (5.50 km^{2})
  - Water: 0.0039 sq mi (0.01 km^{2})
- Elevation: 545 ft (166 m)

Population (2020)
  - Total: 2,522
  - Density: 1,188.4/sq mi (458.85/km^{2})
- Time zone: UTC-5 (Eastern (EST))
  - Summer (DST): UTC-4 (EDT)
- ZIP code: 28103
- Area code: 704
- FIPS code: 37-41640
- GNIS feature ID: 2406104
- Website: www.marshville.org

Marshville is a town in Union County, North Carolina, United States. As of the 2020 census, Marshville had a population of 2,522. Marshville is known as the birthplace of country music singer Randy Travis.

== Geography ==
According to the United States Census Bureau, the town has a total area of 2.1 square miles (5.4 km^{2}), of which 2.0 square miles (5.2 km^{2}) is land and 0.49% is water.

== Education ==
=== Public education ===
The town is served by Marshville Elementary School, East Union Middle School, and Forest Hills High School, all 3 of which are operated by Union County Public Schools.

== Demographics ==
Historical population
Census	Pop.	Note	%±
1900	349		—
1910	499		43.0%
1920	828		65.9%
1930	933		12.7%
1940	1,007		7.9%
1950	1,258		24.9%
1960	1,360		8.1%
1970	1,405		3.3%
1980	2,011		43.1%
1990	2,020		0.4%
2000	2,360		16.8%
2010	2,402		1.8%
2020	2,522		5.0%
U.S. Decennial Census

=== 2020 census ===
As of the 2020 census, Marshville had a population of 2,522. The median age was 36.9 years. 27.2% of residents were under the age of 18 and 15.2% of residents were 65 years of age or older. For every 100 females there were 90.1 males, and for every 100 females age 18 and over there were 83.9 males age 18 and over.

0.0% of residents lived in urban areas, while 100.0% lived in rural areas.

There were 866 households in Marshville, of which 42.0% had children under the age of 18 living in them. Of all households, 35.5% were married-couple households, 20.3% were households with a male householder and no spouse or partner present, and 35.9% were households with a female householder and no spouse or partner present. About 24.3% of all households were made up of individuals and 8.9% had someone living alone who was 65 years of age or older.

There were 952 housing units, of which 9.0% were vacant. The homeowner vacancy rate was 0.8% and the rental vacancy rate was 2.8%.

Marshville racial composition
Race	Number	Percentage
White (non-Hispanic)	901	35.73%
Black or African American (non-Hispanic)	1,108	43.93%
Native American	14	0.56%
Asian	16	0.63%
Other/Mixed	87	3.45%
Hispanic or Latino	396	15.7%

=== 2010 census ===
As of the census of 2010, there were 2,402 people, 809 households, and 581 families residing in the town. The population density was 1,151.4 inhabitants per square mile (444.6/km^{2}). There were 868 housing units at an average density of 423.5 per square mile (163.5/km^{2}). The racial makeup of the town was 48% White, 45.3% African American, 0.06% Native American, 0.20% Asian, 4% from other races, and 1.9% from two or more races. Hispanic or Latino of any race were 3.22% of the population.

There were 812 households, out of which 37.8% had children under the age of 18 living with them, 50.7% were married couples living together, 15.9% had a female householder with no husband present, and 28.8% were non-families. 24.5% of all households were made up of individuals, and 11.3% had someone living alone who was 65 years of age or older. The average household size was 2.79 and the average family size was 3.36.

In the town the population was spread out, with 28.8% under the age of 18, 8.2% from 18 to 24, 29.2% from 25 to 44, 19.3% from 45 to 64, and 14.5% who were 65 years of age or older. The median age was 34 years. For every 100 females, there were 88.6 males. For every 100 females age 18 and over, there were 81.0 males.

The median income for a household in the town was $36,140, and the median income for a family was $42,589. Males had a median income of $30,039 versus $21,413 for females. The per capita income for the town was $15,498. About 8.3% of families and 10.9% of the population were below the poverty line, including 9.3% of those under age 18 and 13.1% of those age 65 or over.

== Culture ==
Marshville is the site of the Randy Travis Festival, an annual street fair and carnival that takes place every fall.

Parts of the 1985 Oscar-nominated movie The Color Purple were filmed in Marshville. The movie was directed by Steven Spielberg and its cast included Oprah Winfrey and Whoopi Goldberg.

In June 2012 the Marshville Museum And Cultural Center was opened with exhibits on the history of Marshville, the surrounding area, and its residents.

== Notable people ==
- Jaleel McLaughlin, NFL Running back, Denver Broncos, holds record for most rushing yards in NCAA.
- Judy Jordan, author, National Book Critics Circle Award for Poetry
- Joshua Park, actor and Theatre World Award winner (The Adventures of Tom Sawyer).
- K-Ci & JoJo, R&B singers and members of Jodeci
- Mattie Clyburn Rice, African-American member of the United Daughters of the Confederacy
- Randy Travis, country and gospel singer and actor
