= Randolph County, North Carolina =

County in North Carolina, United States

- County
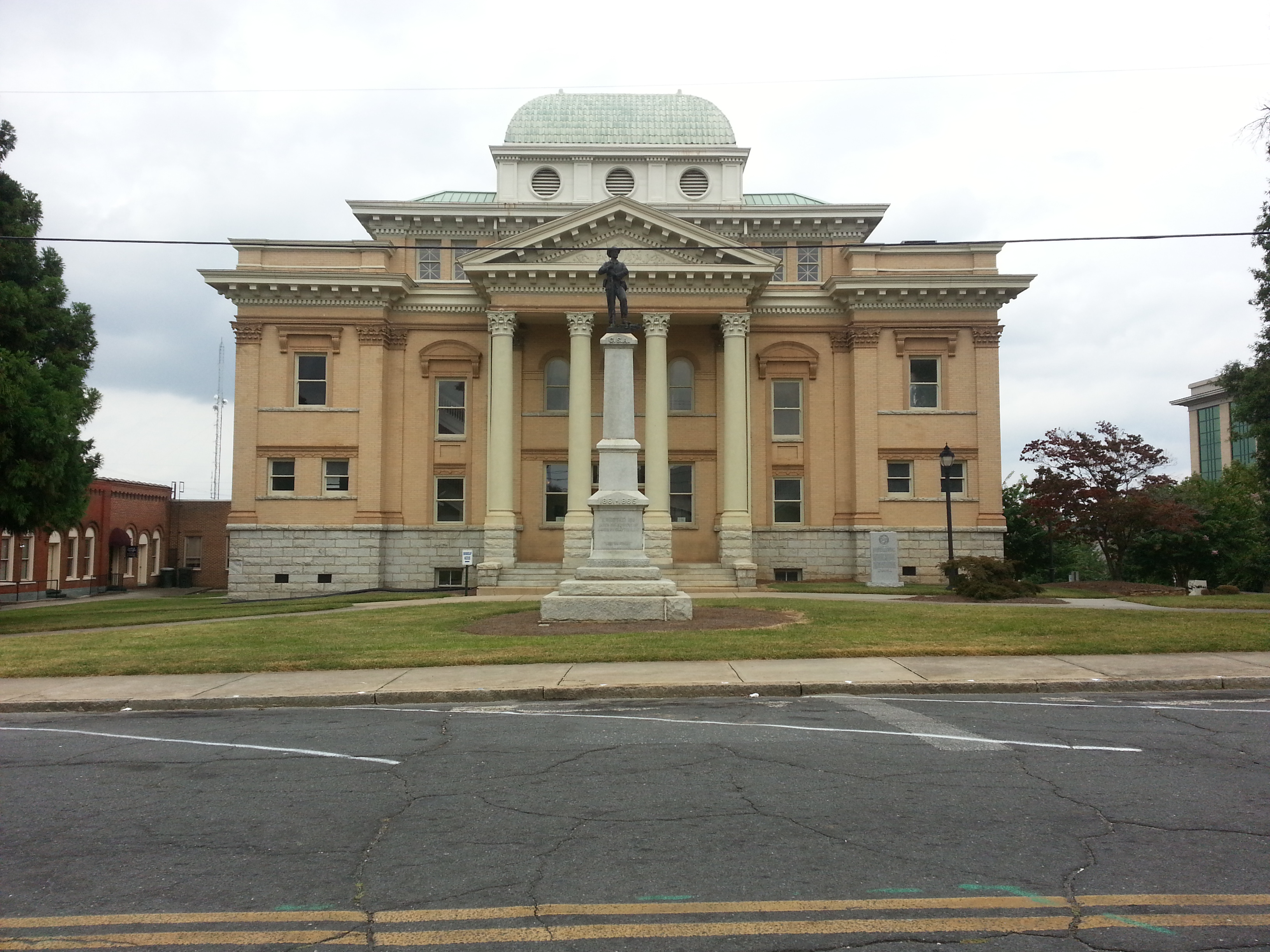
- Randolph County Courthouse and Confederate Monument

- Flag Seal Logo
- Motto: "Serving with Heart from the Heart of North Carolina"
- Location within the U.S. state of North Carolina
- Coordinates: 35.71°N 79.81°W
- Country: United States
- State: North Carolina
- Founded: 1779
- Named for: Peyton Randolph
- Seat: Asheboro
- Largest community: Asheboro

Area
  - Total: 790.01 sq mi (2,046.1 km^{2})
  - Land: 782.38 sq mi (2,026.4 km^{2})
  - Water: 7.63 sq mi (19.8 km^{2}) 0.97%

Population (2020)
  - Total: 144,171
  - Estimate (2025): 149,516 ▲
  - Density: 184.27/sq mi (71.15/km^{2})
- Time zone: UTC−5 (Eastern)
  - Summer (DST): UTC−4 (EDT)
- Congressional district: 9th
- Website: www.randolphcountync.gov

Randolph County is a county located in the U.S. state of North Carolina. As of the 2020 census, the population was 144,171. Its county seat is Asheboro.

Randolph County is included in the Greensboro-High Point, NC Metropolitan Statistical Area, which is also included in the Greensboro–Winston-Salem–High Point, NC Combined Statistical Area.

In 2020, the center of population of North Carolina was located in Randolph County, east of Seagrove.

== History ==
The area which eventually became known as Randolph county was originally inhabited by Siouan Native Americans including Saponi and Keyauwee. In the 1700s, European settlers moved into the area, namely Germans, Scotch-Irish, and English, some of whom were Quakers and Moravians. The Legislature of 1779, then sitting at Halifax, passed an act providing for the formation of a new county from parts of Guilford and Rowan, to be called Randolph. It was named for Peyton Randolph, first president of the Continental Congress.

In the antebellum period, Randolph County was economically poor and characterized by smallholding farmers.

The outbreak of the American Civil War caused division in the county. Many resident Quakers were pacifists and opposed to the war, while poorer conscripts resented being detailed to the frontlines while wealthier militia officers were frequently exempted from such service, leading to many refusing to muster out. In the 1864 gubernatorial election, Randolph was one of only three counties in the state to supply a majority of its votes to William Woods Holden, who was running on a peace platform. A substantial number of men drafted to serve in the Confederate Army from Randolph deserted and were kept hidden with assistance of the anti-Confederate Heroes of America, leading the state government to order operations in 1863 to detain them. The activity of deserters was curtailed by late 1864, though it increased in early 1865, with widespread reports of theft and robbery. Many local members of the Confederate Home Guard grew fearful of enforcing conscription, and some of the body's leaders doubted their subordinates' loyalty. To ease tensions, the state government dispatched 600 troops to the county in March and offered terms to the deserters.

After the war, the county's government became dominated by men who had supported the Union, and some used their new positions of power to enact revenge on those who had enforced the conscription law. Between 1868 and 1872, the white supremacist and reactionary Ku Klux Klan whose members were made up of Southern Democrats of the Democratic Party. However, despite the Klan's activity, the majority of whites residing in Randolph County remained largely supportive of the Republican Party and the civil rights movement. The most recent affiliation with the Klan took place in May 2017 at the biker gang The Rebel Rousers, headquarters in Asheboro for a cross burning ceremony.

Randolph's textile industry expanded after the war with the establishment of new mills along the Deep River.

In 1911, a new county called Piedmont County was proposed, with High Point as its county seat, to be created from Guilford, Davidson, and Randolph counties. Many people appeared at the Guilford County courthouse to oppose the plan, vowing to go to the state legislature to protest. The state legislature voted down the plan in February 1911.

== Geography ==
Interactive map of Randolph County

According to the U.S. Census Bureau, the county has a total area of 790.01 square miles (2,046.1 km^{2}), of which 782.38 square miles (2,026.4 km^{2}) is land and 7.63 square miles (19.8 km^{2}) (0.97%) is water. It is bordered by Guilford County, Alamance County, Chatham County, Moore County, Montgomery County, and Davidson County.

Randolph County is located in the center of North Carolina, and the city of Asheboro (in the county) is the center point of North Carolina. Randolph County is located in the Piedmont section of central North Carolina, generally a region of gently rolling hills and woodlands. The central and western parts of the county contain the Uwharrie Mountains and the Caraway Mountains. These two ranges are the remnants of a much-higher range of ancient peaks. Today, they rarely top 1,000 feet (300 m) above sea level, yet due to the relative low terrain around them, they still rise 200–500 feet (61–152 m) above their base.

The highest point in Randolph County is Shepherd Mountain, a peak in the Caraways. The North Carolina Zoo is located atop Purgatory Mountain, one of the peaks of the Uwharries.

=== National protected area ===
- Birkhead Mountains Wilderness
- Uwharrie National Forest

=== State and local protected areas/sites ===
- North Carolina Zoo
- Pisgah Covered Bridge
- Uwharrie Game Land (part)

=== Major water bodies ===
- Back Creek
- Bush Creek
- Caraway Creek
- Deep River
- Little Caraway Creek
- Little River
- Little Uwharrie River
- Randleman Lake
- Reed Creek
- Rocky River
- Toms Creek
- Uwharrie River

=== Major highways ===
- I-73
- I-74
- I-85
- Future I-685
- US 29
- US 64
- US 64 Bus.
- US 70
- US 220
- US 220 Alt.
- US 220 Bus.
- US 311
- US 421
- NC 22
- NC 42
- NC 47
- NC 49
- NC 62
- NC 109
- NC 134
- NC 159
- NC 159 Spur (spur route)
- NC 705

=== Major infrastructure ===
- Asheboro Regional Airport

== Demographics ==
Historical population
Census	Pop.	Note	%±
1790	7,318		—
1800	9,234		26.2%
1810	10,112		9.5%
1820	11,331		12.1%
1830	12,406		9.5%
1840	12,875		3.8%
1850	15,832		23.0%
1860	16,793		6.1%
1870	17,551		4.5%
1880	20,836		18.7%
1890	25,195		20.9%
1900	28,232		12.1%
1910	29,491		4.5%
1920	30,856		4.6%
1930	36,259		17.5%
1940	44,554		22.9%
1950	50,804		14.0%
1960	61,497		21.0%
1970	76,358		24.2%
1980	91,728		20.1%
1990	106,546		16.2%
2000	130,454		22.4%
2010	141,752		8.7%
2020	144,171		1.7%
2025 (est.)	149,516	▲	3.7%
U.S. Decennial Census; 1790–1960 1900–1990; 1990–2000 2010 2020

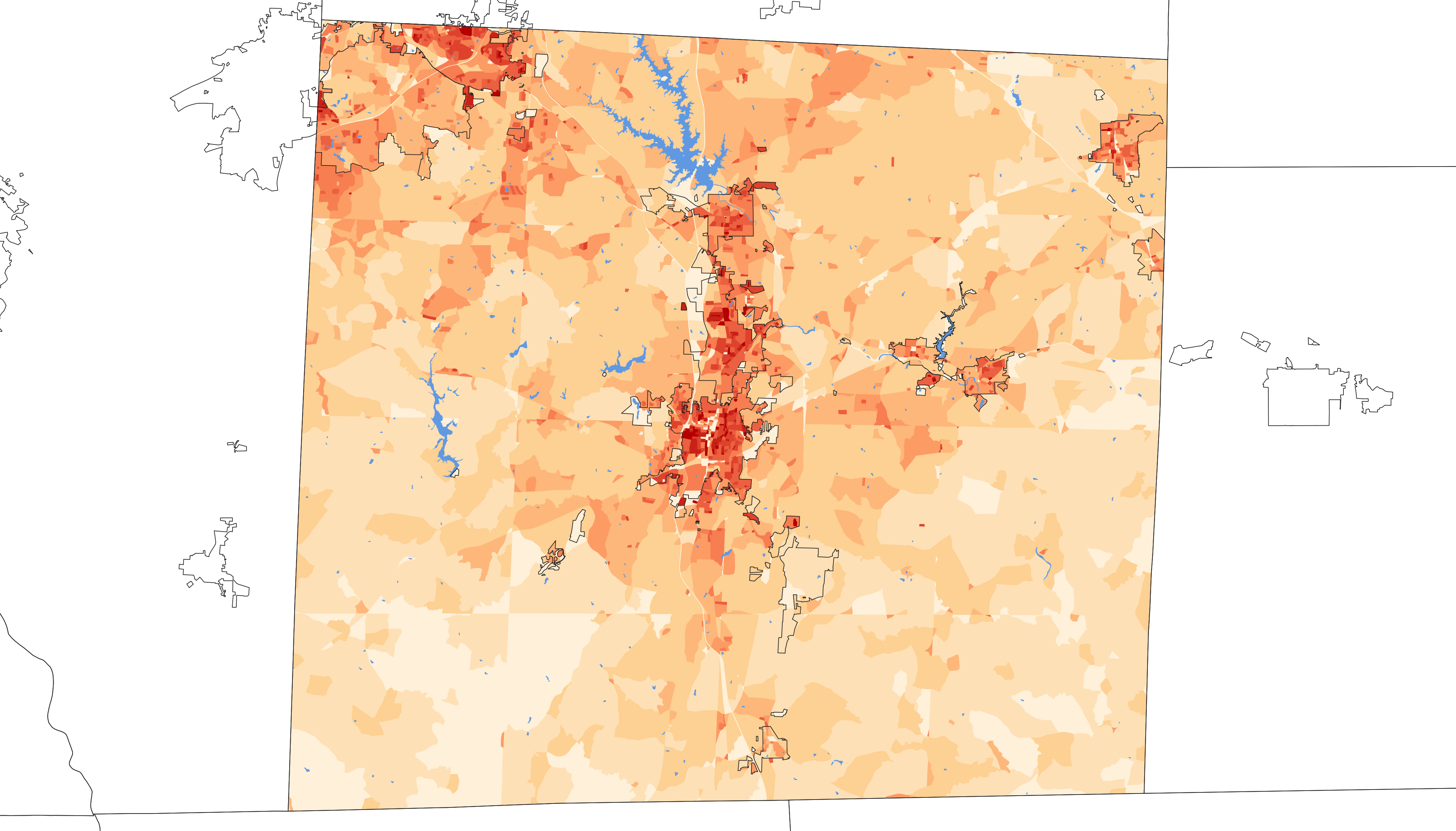
2020 population density of Randolph County NC by census block

=== Racial and ethnic composition ===
Randolph County, North Carolina – Racial and ethnic composition Note: the US Census treats Hispanic/Latino as an ethnic category. This table excludes Latinos from the racial categories and assigns them to a separate category. Hispanics/Latinos may be of any race.
Race / Ethnicity (NH = Non-Hispanic)	Pop 1980	Pop 1990	Pop 2000	Pop 2010	Pop 2020	% 1980	% 1990	% 2000	% 2010	% 2020
White alone (NH)	85,099	98,659	112,250	115,205	108,354	92.77%	92.60%	86.05%	81.27%	75.16%
Black or African American alone (NH)	5,700	6,350	7,259	7,979	8,592	6.21%	5.96%	5.56%	5.63%	5.96%
Native American or Alaska Native alone (NH)	253	436	543	674	666	0.28%	0.41%	0.42%	0.48%	0.46%
Asian alone (NH)	139	346	807	1,406	2,158	0.15%	0.32%	0.62%	0.99%	1.50%
Native Hawaiian or Pacific Islander alone (NH)	x	x	12	20	10	x	x	0.01%	0.01%	0.01%
Other race alone (NH)	49	21	57	140	412	0.05%	0.02%	0.04%	0.10%	0.29%
Mixed race or Multiracial (NH)	x	x	880	1,630	4,928	x	x	0.67%	1.15%	3.42%
Hispanic or Latino (any race)	488	734	8,646	14,698	19,051	0.53%	0.69%	6.63%	10.37%	13.21%
Total	91,728	106,546	130,454	141,752	144,171	100.00%	100.00%	100.00%	100.00%	100.00%

=== 2020 census ===
As of the 2020 census, there were 144,171 people and 57,470 households in the county, including 37,795 families residing in the county.

The median age was 42.4 years. 22.1% of residents were under the age of 18 and 18.9% of residents were 65 years of age or older. For every 100 females there were 97.0 males, and for every 100 females age 18 and over there were 95.1 males age 18 and over.

The racial makeup of the county was 77.3% White, 6.1% Black or African American, 0.8% American Indian and Alaska Native, 1.5% Asian, <0.1% Native Hawaiian and Pacific Islander, 7.5% from some other race, and 6.8% from two or more races. Hispanic or Latino residents of any race comprised 13.2% of the population.

39.8% of residents lived in urban areas, while 60.2% lived in rural areas.

There were 57,470 households in the county, of which 29.9% had children under the age of 18 living in them. Of all households, 49.6% were married-couple households, 18.2% were households with a male householder and no spouse or partner present, and 25.9% were households with a female householder and no spouse or partner present. About 26.9% of all households were made up of individuals and 12.5% had someone living alone who was 65 years of age or older.

There were 62,024 housing units, of which 7.3% were vacant. Among occupied housing units, 72.2% were owner-occupied and 27.8% were renter-occupied. The homeowner vacancy rate was 1.2% and the rental vacancy rate was 6.2%.

=== 2000 census ===
At the 2000 census, 130,454 people, 50,659 households, and 37,335 families resided in the county. The population density was 166 people per square mile (64 people/km^{2}). The 54,422 housing units averaged 69 units per square mile (27 units/km^{2}). The racial makeup of the county was 89.20% White, 5.63% Black or African American, 0.45% Native American, 0.64% Asian, 0.02% Pacific Islander, 3.01% from other races, and 1.06% from two or more races. About 6.63% of the population was Hispanic or Latino of any race.

As with much of North Carolina, the Latino population of Randolph County continued to grow into the 21st century. In 2005, figures placed the Latino population as 9.3% of the county's total.

In 2000, of the 50,659 households, 33.70% had children under the age of 18 living with them, 59.10% were married couples living together, 10.20% had a female householder with no husband present, and 26.30% were not families. About 22.50% of all households were made up of individuals, and 8.60% had someone living alone who was 65 years of age or older. The average household size was 2.55 and the average family size was 2.97.

In the county, the population was distributed as 25.00% under the age of 18, 8.00% from 18 to 24, 31.30% from 25 to 44, 23.50% from 45 to 64, and 12.10% who were 65 years of age or older. The median age was 36 years. For every 100 females, there were 97.80 males. For every 100 females age 18 and over, there were 95.40 males.

The median income for a household in the county was $38,348, and for a family was $44,369. Males had a median income of $30,575 versus $22,503 for females. The per capita income for the county was $18,236. About 6.80% of families and 9.10% of the population were below the poverty line, including 11.60% of those under age 18 and 11.50% of those age 65 or over.

== Government and politics ==
=== Government ===
Randolph County operates under a commissioner–manager form of government. It is governed by a five-member board of commissioners, with each commissioner elected in partisan contests at-large to serve a four-year term. The commissioners adopt county policy, create the county's budget, and hire the county manager. The manager oversees the administration of county government and implements the commissioners' policies.

Randolph County is a member of the Piedmont Triad Council of Governments, a regional voluntary association of 12 counties.

Randolph County lies within the bounds of North Carolina's 37th Prosecutorial District, the 19B Superior Court District, and the 19B District Court District.

=== Politics ===
United States presidential election results for Randolph County, North Carolina
Year	Republican		Democratic		Third party(ies)	
Year	No.	%	No.	%	No.	%
1880	1,811	47.46%	2,005	52.54%	0	0.00%
1884	1,890	46.90%	1,968	48.83%	172	4.27%
1888	2,339	49.53%	2,121	44.92%	262	5.55%
1892	1,883	39.09%	2,077	43.12%	857	17.79%
1896	2,743	51.47%	2,482	46.58%	104	1.95%
1900	2,487	52.04%	2,264	47.37%	28	0.59%
1904	1,808	43.43%	2,334	56.07%	21	0.50%
1908	2,676	51.98%	2,472	48.02%	0	0.00%
1912	370	7.63%	2,665	54.95%	1,815	37.42%
1916	3,031	52.43%	2,747	47.52%	3	0.05%
1920	6,297	55.20%	5,110	44.80%	0	0.00%
1924	6,336	53.89%	5,397	45.90%	24	0.20%
1928	7,414	63.90%	4,188	36.10%	0	0.00%
1932	6,072	45.00%	7,345	54.44%	75	0.56%
1936	6,927	46.13%	8,090	53.87%	0	0.00%
1940	7,056	45.49%	8,455	54.51%	0	0.00%
1944	8,768	54.65%	7,277	45.35%	0	0.00%
1948	8,372	53.39%	6,567	41.88%	743	4.74%
1952	12,429	58.07%	8,975	41.93%	0	0.00%
1956	13,174	61.05%	8,404	38.95%	0	0.00%
1960	15,772	61.70%	9,789	38.30%	0	0.00%
1964	13,739	56.36%	10,638	43.64%	0	0.00%
1968	13,450	52.35%	5,351	20.83%	6,892	26.82%
1972	18,724	76.02%	5,346	21.71%	559	2.27%
1976	14,337	52.72%	12,714	46.75%	146	0.54%
1980	19,881	64.72%	10,107	32.90%	729	2.37%
1984	25,759	77.36%	7,511	22.56%	29	0.09%
1988	23,881	73.32%	8,641	26.53%	49	0.15%
1992	20,697	53.20%	11,274	28.98%	6,931	17.82%
1996	23,030	61.36%	10,783	28.73%	3,722	9.92%
2000	30,959	72.51%	11,366	26.62%	371	0.87%
2004	37,771	74.19%	12,966	25.47%	173	0.34%
2008	40,998	70.51%	16,414	28.23%	735	1.26%
2012	45,160	74.38%	14,773	24.33%	782	1.29%
2016	49,430	76.55%	13,194	20.43%	1,951	3.02%
2020	56,894	77.60%	15,618	21.30%	804	1.10%
2024	59,357	78.09%	15,951	20.99%	700	0.92%

Politically, Randolph County is a huge outlier in North Carolina. The county is one of the most Republican-dominated counties in the state. The Republican dominance dates back to the Solid South era; it has supported the Republican presidential candidate in all but three elections since 1916. No Democratic presidential nominee has carried the county since Franklin D. Roosevelt in 1940, and Jimmy Carter is the last Democrat to even tally 40 percent of the county's vote. In 1964, it was one of only 13 counties in the state to vote for Barry Goldwater, and the easternmost county in the state to do so. Republican dominance at the local level is extremely absolute that in some cases, Republican candidates and incumbents run unopposed.

== Economy ==
Randolph's economy is largely based in manufacturing. In its 2024 county economic tier ratings, the North Carolina Department of Commerce classified Randolph as among the state's 20 least economically distressed counties, or "tier 1".

== Education ==
Randolph County School System includes most of the county. A central portion of the county, with the majority of Asheboro and portions of unincorporated areas, is instead in the Asheboro City Schools school district.

Fayetteville Street Christian School, located in Asheboro, is the largest private school in Randolph County.

== Culture ==
Pottery-making has long been popular in the Seagrove area of Randolph County, and is annually celebrated in the Seagrove Pottery Festival.

== Communities ==
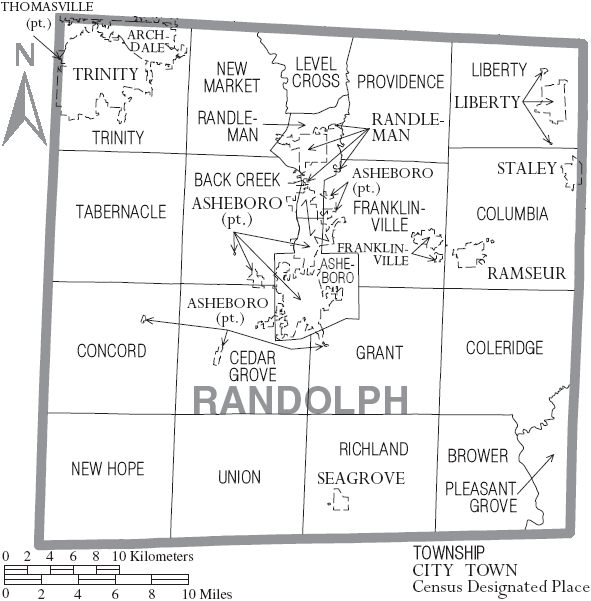
Map of Randolph County with municipal and township labels

=== Cities ===
- Archdale (part; also in Guilford County)
- Asheboro (county seat and largest community)
- High Point (part; also in Guilford, Davidson, and Forsyth)
- Randleman
- Thomasville (part; mostly in Davidson County)
- Trinity

=== Towns ===
- Franklinville
- Liberty
- Ramseur
- Seagrove
- Staley

=== Townships ===
- Asheboro
- Archdale
- Back Creek
- Brower
- Cedar Grove
- Coleridge
- Columbia
- Concord
- Farmer
- Franklinville
- Grant
- Level Cross
- Liberty
- New Hope
- New Market
- Pleasant Grove
- Providence
- Randleman
- Richland
- Tabernacle
- Trinity
- Union

=== Unincorporated communities ===
- Cedar Grove
- Climax (also in Guilford County)
- Coleridge
- Erect
- Farmer
- Level Cross
- Pisgah
- Sophia
- Ulah
- Whynot

=== Extinct ===
- Johnstonville

== Notable people ==
- Sam Ard, NASCAR driver
- Jerry Bledsoe, author
- Heidi N Closet, drag queen
- Braxton Craven, educator and second president of Duke University
- Heaven Fitch, wrestler
- Rufus Hussey, marksman
- Henderson Luelling, Quaker abolitionist, horticulturist
- Gideon Morris, trans-Appalachian pioneer and founder of Morristown, Tennessee
- Adam Petty, NASCAR driver
- Kyle Petty, NASCAR driver
- Lee Petty, NASCAR pioneer
- Richard Petty, NASCAR driver
- John Milton Odell, American industrialist
- Islay Walden, poet, teacher, and minister
- Naomi Wise, murder victim
- Jonathan Worth, former Governor of North Carolina (1865–1868)

== See also ==
- List of counties in North Carolina
- National Register of Historic Places listings in Randolph County, North Carolina

== Works cited ==
- Corbitt, David Leroy (2000). The formation of the North Carolina counties, 1663-1943 (reprint ed.). Raleigh: North Carolina Division of Archives and History. OCLC 46398241.
- Escott, Paul D. (1985). Many Excellent People : Power and Privilege in North Carolina, 1850-1900. Chapel Hill: University of North Carolina Press. ISBN 978-0-8078-1651-6.
