= Topographic wetness index =

Steady state wetness index

The topographic wetness index (TWI), also known as the compound topographic index (CTI), is a steady state wetness index. It is commonly used to quantify topographic control on hydrological processes. The index is a function of both the slope and the upstream contributing area per unit width orthogonal to the flow direction. The index was designed for hillslope catenas. Accumulation numbers in flat areas will be very large, so TWI will not be a relevant variable. The index is highly correlated with several soil attributes such as horizon depth, silt percentage, organic matter content, and phosphorus. Methods of computing this index differ primarily in the way the upslope contributing area is calculated.

== Definition ==
The topographic wetness index is defined as:

$\ln {a \over \tan b}$

where $a$ is the local upslope area draining through a certain point per unit contour length and $b$ is the local slope in radians. The TWI has been used to study spatial scale effects on hydrological processes. The topographic wetness index (TWI) was developed by Beven and Kirkby within the runoff model TOPMODEL. Although the topographic wetness index is not a unitless number, it is sufficiently approximate that its interpretation doesn't rely on its physical units. Rather, it should be interpreted that areas with similar TWIs become saturated under similar moisture conditions, as described by Dr John Lindsay of the University of Guelph.

== Uses ==
The TWI has been used to study spatial scale effects on hydrological processes and to identify hydrological flow paths for geochemical modelling, as well as to characterize biological processes such as annual net primary production, vegetation patterns, and forest site quality.
