= Lanesboro Township, Anson County, North Carolina =

Coordinates: 34.99202°N 80.23779°W

- Township
- Location of Lanesboro Township in Anson County

- Location of Anson County in North Carolina
- Country: United States
- State: North Carolina
- County: Anson

Area
  - Total: 61.14 sq mi (158.34 km^{2})
- Highest elevation (high point at northwest part of township): 528 ft (161 m)
- Lowest elevation (Brown Creek where it flows out of the township (e side)): 236 ft (72 m)

Population (2010)
  - Total: 6,015
  - Density: 98.38/sq mi (37.98/km^{2})
- Time zone: UTC-4 (EST)
  - Summer (DST): UTC-5 (EDT)
- Area code: 704

Lanesboro Township, population 6,015, is one of eight townships in Anson County, North Carolina. Lanesboro Township is 61.14 square miles (158.4 km^{2}) in size and located in western Anson County. Lanesboro Township contains the towns of Peachland and Polkton within it.

== Geography ==
Lanesboro Township is drained by Lanes Creek and its tributaries on the north and west side. These tributaries include Canebreak Branch, Big Branch, Cedar Branch, Rocky Branch, Blackwell Branch, Lacey Branch, and Wide Mouth Branch. The eastern and southern parts of the township are drained by Brown Creek and its tributaries including Little Brown Creek, Ledbetter Branch, Swans Branch, Lick Creek, and Kelley Branch.
