= Ansonville Township, Anson County, North Carolina =

Coordinates: 35.09359°N 80.10562°W

- Township
- Location of Ansonville Township in Anson County

- Location of Anson County in North Carolina
- Country: United States
- State: North Carolina
- County: Anson

Area
  - Total: 69.22 sq mi (179.29 km^{2})
- Highest elevation (high point on west side of township): 452 ft (138 m)
- Lowest elevation (Pee Dee River where it flows out of township on northeast side): 180 ft (55 m)

Population (2010)
  - Total: 1,698
  - Density: 24.53/sq mi (9.47/km^{2})
- Time zone: UTC-4 (EST)
  - Summer (DST): UTC-5 (EDT)
- Area code: 704

Ansonville Township, population 1,698, is one of eight townships in Anson County, North Carolina. Ansonville Township is 69.22 square miles (179.3 km^{2}) in size and is located in northern Anson County. This township includes the town of Ansonville within its boundaries.

== Geography ==
Ansonville Township is bounded by Rocky River and Pee Dee River on the north side, Cedar Creek on the east, and Lanes Creek on the west. Camp Branch is the only tributary to the Rocky River in the township, Tributaries to the Pee Dee River include Buffalo Creek, Pressley Creek and Brown Creek, which drains most of the southern part of the township. Tributaries to Brown Creek include Flat Fork, Hurricane Creek, Palmetto Branch, Goulds Fork, Jacks Branch, and Cabin Branch. Little Creek is the only named tributary to Lanes Creek in the township.
