= Wadesboro Township, Anson County, North Carolina =

Coordinates: 34.98952°N 80.09422°W

- Township
- Location of Wadesboro Township in Anson County

- Location of Anson County in North Carolina
- Country: United States
- State: North Carolina
- County: Anson

Area
  - Total: 73.15 sq mi (189.46 km^{2})
- Highest elevation (high point at southwest end of township): 602 ft (183 m)
- Lowest elevation (Goulds Fork, where it flows north out of the township): 218 ft (66 m)

Population (2010)
  - Total: 9,118
  - Density: 124.65/sq mi (48.13/km^{2})
- Time zone: UTC-4 (EST)
  - Summer (DST): UTC-5 (EDT)
- Area code: 704

Wadesboro Township, population 9,118, is one of eight townships in Anson County, North Carolina, United States. Wadesboro Township is 73.15 square miles (189.5 km^{2}) in size and located in central Anson County. Wadesboro Township contains the town of Wadesboro.

== Geography ==
Wadesboro Township is drained by Brown Creek and its tributaries on the north and west. These tributaries include Pinch Gut Creek, Goulds Fork, Hurricane Creek, and Flat Fork. Goulds Fork has two tributaries, Culpepper Creek and Grindstone Branch. The northeast part of the township is drained by Cedar Creek. The southeast end is drained by Bailey Creek and its tributary Brush Fork and by North Fork Jones Creek and its tributary, Lampley Branch.
