= Cranes Branch (Brown Creek tributary) =

Stream in North Carolina, USA

Cranes Branch Tributary to Brown Creek
- Location of Cranes Branch mouth

Location
- Country: United States
- State: North Carolina
- County: Anson

Physical characteristics
- Source: divide between Cranes Branch and Lanes Creek
  - location: about 1.5 miles north of Polkton, North Carolina
  - coordinates: 35°01′15″N 080°11′46″W
  - elevation: 415 ft (126 m)
- Mouth: Brown Creek
  - location: about 3 miles northeast of Polkton, North Carolina
  - coordinates: 35°02′02″N 080°08′58″W
  - elevation: 223 ft (68 m)
- Length: 3.35 mi (5.39 km)
- Basin size: 2.61 square miles (6.8 km^{2})
- Discharge
  - location: Brown Creek
  - average: 3.07 cu ft/s (0.087 m^{3}/s) at mouth with Brown Creek

Basin features
- Progression: east
- River system: Pee Dee River
- Tributaries
  - left: unnamed tributaries
  - right: unnamed tributaries
- Bridges: Ansonville-Polkton Road, Cameron-Briley Road

Cranes Branch is a tributary of Brown Creek in Anson County, North Carolina that rises north of Polkton, North Carolina and then flows east to meet Brown Creek about 3 miles northeast of Polkton. The watershed is about 58% forested, 36% agricultural and the rest is of other land uses.

== See also ==
- List of North Carolina rivers
