= Cabbage Branch (Brown Creek tributary) =

Stream in North Carolina, USA

Cabbage Branch Tributary to Brown Creek
- Location of Cabbage Branch mouth Cabbage Branch (Brown Creek tributary) (the United States)

Location
- Country: United States
- State: North Carolina
- County: Anson

Physical characteristics
- Source: divide between Cabbage Branch and Buffalo Creek
  - location: pond about 0.5 miles w of Ansonville, North Carolina
  - coordinates: 35°06′22″N 080°07′53″W
  - elevation: 350 ft (110 m)
- Mouth: Brown Creek
  - location: about 3 miles south of Ansonville, North Carolina
  - coordinates: 35°03′56″N 080°06′50″W
  - elevation: 213 ft (65 m)
- Length: 3.59 mi (5.78 km)
- Basin size: 2.08 square miles (5.4 km^{2})
- Discharge
  - location: Brown Creek
  - average: 2.46 cu ft/s (0.070 m^{3}/s) at mouth with Brown Creek

Basin features
- Progression: south-southeast
- River system: Pee Dee River
- Tributaries
  - left: unnamed tributaries
  - right: unnamed tributaries
- Bridges: Ansonville-Polkton Road, Jacks Branch Road

Cabbage Branch is a 3.59 mi (5.78 km) long 1st order tributary to Brown Creek in Anson County, North Carolina.

== Course ==
Cabbage Branch rises in a pond about 0.5 miles west of Ansonville, North Carolina. Cabbage Branch then flows south-southeast to meet Brown Creek about 3 miles south of Ansonville, North Carolina.

== Watershed ==
Cabbage Branch drains 2.08 square miles (5.4 km^{2}) of area, receives about 47.9 in/year of precipitation, has a topographic wetness index of 445.24 and is about 62% forested.
