= Wadesboro =

Wadesboro or Wadesborough may refer to:

- Wadesboro, Florida
- Wadesboro, Kentucky
- Wadesboro, Louisiana
- Wadesboro, North Carolina
- Wadesboro Downtown Historic District, North Carolina
- Wadesboro Township, Anson County, North Carolina
- Wadesboro—Florence Line
