= Permetter Branch (Brown Creek tributary) =

Stream in North Carolina, USA

Permetter Branch Tributary to Brown Creek
- Location of Permetter Branch mouth Permetter Branch (Brown Creek tributary) (the United States)

Location
- Country: United States
- State: North Carolina
- County: Anson

Physical characteristics
- Source: divide between Permetter Branch and Buffalo Creek
  - location: pond about 0.5 miles west of Ansonville, North Carolina
  - coordinates: 35°06′37″N 080°07′38″W
  - elevation: 340 ft (100 m)
- Mouth: Brown Creek
  - location: about 2 miles south of Ansonville, North Carolina
  - coordinates: 35°04′06″N 080°05′44″W
  - elevation: 210 ft (64 m)
- Length: 3.79 mi (6.10 km)
- Basin size: 3.89 square miles (10.1 km^{2})
- Discharge
  - location: Brown Creek
  - average: 4.44 cu ft/s (0.126 m^{3}/s) at mouth with Brown Creek

Basin features
- Progression: southeast
- River system: Pee Dee River
- Tributaries
  - left: Canal Branch
  - right: unnamed tributaries
- Bridges: Ansonville-Polkton Road, Mt. Vernon Road, Jacks Branch Road

Permetter Branch is a 3.79 mi (6.10 km) long 2nd order tributary to Brown Creek in Anson County, North Carolina.

== Variant names ==
According to the Geographic Names Information System, it has also been known historically as:

- Palmetto Branch

== Course ==
Permetter Branch rises about 0.5 miles west of Ansonville, North Carolina. Permetter Branch then flows southeast to meet Brown Creek about 2 miles south of Ansonville, North Carolina.

== Watershed ==
Permetter Branch drains 3.89 square miles (10.1 km^{2}) of area, receives about 47.8 in/year of precipitation, has a topographic wetness index of 452.68 and is about 50% forested.
