= Flat Fork (Brown Creek tributary) =

Stream in North Carolina, USA

Flat Fork Tributary to Brown Creek
- Location of Flat Fork mouth Flat Fork (Brown Creek tributary) (the United States)

Location
- Country: United States
- State: North Carolina
- County: Anson

Physical characteristics
- Source: divide between Flat Fork and Goulds Fork
  - location: about 0.5 miles northeast of Wadesboro, North Carolina
  - coordinates: 34°59′43″N 080°03′29″W
  - elevation: 340 ft (100 m)
- Mouth: Brown Creek
  - location: about 4 miles southeast of Ansonville, North Carolina
  - coordinates: 35°04′16″N 080°01′37″W
  - elevation: 187 ft (57 m)
- Length: 7.15 mi (11.51 km)
- Basin size: 11.95 square miles (31.0 km^{2})
- Discharge
  - location: Brown Creek
  - average: 13.11 cu ft/s (0.371 m^{3}/s) at mouth with Brown Creek

Basin features
- Progression: northeast
- River system: Pee Dee River
- Tributaries
  - left: unnamed tributaries
  - right: unnamed tributaries
- Bridges: Pleasant Grove Church Road, Dennis Road

Flat Fork is a 7.15 mi (11.51 km) long 2nd order tributary to Brown Creek in Anson County, North Carolina.

== Course ==
Flat Fork rises about 0.5 miles northeast of Wadesboro, North Carolina. Flat Fork then flows northeast to meet Brown Creek about 4 miles southeast of Ansonville, North Carolina.

== Watershed ==
Flat Fork drains 11.95 square miles (31.0 km^{2}) of area, receives about 47.9 in/year of precipitation, has a topographic wetness index of 417.22 and is about 61% forested.
