= Jacks Branch (Brown Creek tributary) =

Stream in North Carolina, USA

Jacks Branch Tributary to Brown Creek
- Location of Jacks Branch mouth Jacks Branch (Brown Creek tributary) (the United States)

Location
- Country: United States
- State: North Carolina
- County: Anson

Physical characteristics
- Source: divide between Jacks Branch and Lanes Creek
  - location: pond about 5 miles southwest of Cedar Hill, North Carolina
  - coordinates: 35°06′22″N 080°09′28″W
  - elevation: 400 ft (120 m)
- Mouth: Brown Creek
  - location: about 4 miles southwest of Ansonville, North Carolina
  - coordinates: 35°03′25″N 080°07′45″W
  - elevation: 220 ft (67 m)
- Length: 5.18 mi (8.34 km)
- Basin size: 5.42 square miles (14.0 km^{2})
- Discharge
  - location: Brown Creek
  - average: 6.21 cu ft/s (0.176 m^{3}/s) at mouth with Brown Creek

Basin features
- Progression: southeast
- River system: Pee Dee River
- Tributaries
  - left: unnamed tributaries
  - right: unnamed tributaries
- Bridges: Ansonville-Polkton Road, Pope Road (x2), Mt. Vernon Road, Jacks Branch Road

Jacks Branch is a 5.18 mi (8.34 km) long 2nd order tributary to Brown Creek in Anson County, North Carolina.

== Variant names ==
According to the Geographic Names Information System, it has also been known historically as:

- Jacks Creek

== Course ==
Jacks Branch rises about 5 miles southwest of Cedar Hill, North Carolina. Jacks Branch then flows southeast to meet Brown Creek about 4 miles southwest of Ansonville, North Carolina.

== Watershed ==
Jacks Branch drains 5.42 square miles (14.0 km^{2}) of area, receives about 47.9 in/year of precipitation, has a topographic wetness index of 429.10 and is about 47% forested.
