= Battle of Mask's Ferry =

1781 battle of the American Revolutionary War

Battle of Mask’s Ferry
- Part of American Revolutionary War
| Date | September 10, 1780 |
| Location | Anson County, North Carolina 35.105°N 79.923°W |
| Result | Patriot victory |

Belligerents
| (Kingdom of Great Britain) Loyalist militia | (United States) Patriot militia |

Commanders and leaders
| John Kimbrough; Kenneth Saunders † | Peter Hedrick; John Lopp |

Strength
| Unknown | 120 militia |

Casualties and losses
| Unknown killed or wounded 11 captured | None killed Unknown wounded |

The Battle of Mask's Ferry took place on September 10, 1780, in Anson County, North Carolina. The battle was fought between Patriot troops under the command of Peter Hedrick and John Lopp and the Loyalist North Carolina militia commanded by John Kimbrough and Kenneth Saunders. A Patriot scout by the name of Jared Cobia had discovered a Loyalist camp and reported it back to the Patriot command. A decision was made to attack the camp the following night on September 10. The loyalists were caught by surprise and after an intense engagement were forced to retreat. 11 loyalists were captured and Kenneth Saunders was killed in action.
