= Ledbetter Branch (Brown Creek tributary) =

Stream in North Carolina, USA

Ledbetter Branch Tributary to Brown Creek
- Location of Ledbetter Branch mouth

Location
- Country: United States
- State: North Carolina
- County: Anson
- City: Polkton

Physical characteristics
- Source: divide between Ledbetter Branch, Cranes Branch and Lanes Creek
  - location: about 1 mile north of Polkton, North Carolina
  - coordinates: 35°01′31″N 080°12′01″W
  - elevation: 400 ft (120 m)
- Mouth: Brown Creek
  - location: about 0.5 miles south of Polkton, North Carolina
  - coordinates: 34°59′39″N 080°11′52″W
  - elevation: 246 ft (75 m)
- Length: 2.93 mi (4.72 km)
- Basin size: 1.68 square miles (4.4 km^{2})
- Discharge
  - location: Brown Creek
  - average: 2.02 cu ft/s (0.057 m^{3}/s) at mouth with Brown Creek

Basin features
- Progression: east
- River system: Pee Dee River
- Tributaries
  - left: unnamed tributaries
  - right: unnamed tributaries
- Bridges: W Polk Street, Moore Street, Old Route 74, US 74, Poplar Hill Church Road

Ledbetter Branch is a tributary of Brown Creek in Anson County, North Carolina that rises north of Polkton, North Carolina and then flows south to meet Brown Creek south of Polkton, North Carolina. The watershed is about 48% forested, 34% agricultural and the rest is of other land uses.

== See also ==
- List of North Carolina rivers
