= Hurricane Creek (Brown Creek tributary) =

Stream in North Carolina, USA

Hurricane Creek Tributary to Brown Creek
- Location of Hurricane Creek mouth Hurricane Creek (Brown Creek tributary) (the United States)

Location
- Country: United States
- State: North Carolina
- County: Anson

Physical characteristics
- Source: divide between Hurricane Creek and Grindstone Branch of Goulds Fork
  - location: about 0.5 miles north of Pinkston, North Carolina
  - coordinates: 35°01′37″N 080°04′52″W
  - elevation: 275 ft (84 m)
- Mouth: Brown Creek
  - location: about 3.5 miles southeast of Ansonville, North Carolina
  - coordinates: 35°03′49″N 080°03′13″W
  - elevation: 197 ft (60 m)
- Length: 3.74 mi (6.02 km)
- Basin size: 3.43 square miles (8.9 km^{2})
- Discharge
  - location: Brown Creek
  - average: 3.93 cu ft/s (0.111 m^{3}/s) at mouth with Brown Creek

Basin features
- Progression: northeast
- River system: Pee Dee River
- Tributaries
  - left: unnamed tributaries
  - right: unnamed tributaries
- Bridges: Dennis Road

Hurricane Creek is a 3.74 mi (6.02 km) long 1st order tributary to Brown Creek in Anson County, North Carolina.

== Course ==
Hurricane Creek rises about 0.5 miles north of Pinkston, North Carolina near the Wadesboro airport. Hurricane Creek then flows northeast to meet Brown Creek about 3.5 miles southeast of Ansonville, North Carolina.

== Watershed ==
Hurricane Creek drains 3.43 square miles (8.9 km^{2}) of area, receives about 47.9 in/year of precipitation, has a topographic wetness index of 500.57 and is about 53% forested.
