= Lilesville Township, Anson County, North Carolina =

Coordinates: 34.98863°N 79.94994°W

- Township
- Location of Lilesville Township in Anson County

- Location of Anson County in North Carolina
- Country: United States
- State: North Carolina
- County: Anson

Area
  - Total: 108.02 sq mi (279.77 km^{2})
- Highest elevation (high point in central part of township): 532 ft (162 m)
- Lowest elevation (Pee Dee River where it flows out of township at southeast tip): 104 ft (32 m)

Population (2010)
  - Total: 3,366
  - Density: 31.16/sq mi (12.03/km^{2})
- Time zone: UTC-4 (EST)
  - Summer (DST): UTC-5 (EDT)
- Area code: 704

Lilesville Township, population 3,366, is one of eight townships in Anson County, North Carolina, United States. Lilesville Township is 108.02 square miles (279.8 km^{2}) in size, and is located in northeastern Anson County. Lilesville Township contains the town of Lilesville.

== Geography ==
Lilesville Township is drained by the Pee Dee River and its tributaries on the north and east side. These tributaries include Little Creek, Island Creek, McCoy Creek, Smith Creek, Buffalo Creek, Jenkins Branch, Reeder Branch, Savannah Creek, Turkey Top Creek, and Cedar Creek. Jones Creek forms the southern boundary and it has a tributary, Hale Creek. Cedar Creek forms the northwestern border and Bailey Creek forms the southwestern border.
