= Swans Branch (Brown Creek tributary) =

Stream in North Carolina, USA

Swans Branch Tributary to Brown Creek
- Location of Swans Branch mouth

Location
- Country: United States
- State: North Carolina
- County: Anson
- City: Peachland

Physical characteristics
- Source: divide between Swans Branch and Lanes Creek
  - location: Peachland, North Carolina
  - coordinates: 34°59′21″N 080°15′48″W
  - elevation: 430 ft (130 m)
- Mouth: Brown Creek
  - location: about 1 mile south of Polkton, North Carolina
  - coordinates: 34°59′28″N 080°12′21″W
  - elevation: 249 ft (76 m)
- Length: 4.01 mi (6.45 km)
- Basin size: 4.85 square miles (12.6 km^{2})
- Discharge
  - location: Brown Creek
  - average: 5.59 cu ft/s (0.158 m^{3}/s) at mouth with Brown Creek

Basin features
- Progression: east
- River system: Pee Dee River
- Tributaries
  - left: unnamed tributaries
  - right: unnamed tributaries
- Bridges: US 74, E Passaic Street (twice), US 74, Horne Town Road, Poplar Hill Church Road

Swans Branch is a tributary of Brown Creek in Anson County, North Carolina, United States, that rises in the town of Peachland, North Carolina and then flows east to meet Brown Creek south of Polkton, North Carolina. The watershed is about 57% forested, 35% agricultural and the rest is of other land uses.

== See also ==
- List of North Carolina rivers
