= Rushing Branch (Brown Creek tributary) =

Stream in North Carolina, US

Rushing Branch Tributary to Brown Creek
- Location of Rushing Branch mouth

Location
- Country: United States
- State: North Carolina
- County: Anson

Physical characteristics
- Source: divide between Rushing Creek and Bell Creek
  - location: about 0.5 miles north of Becky Hill, North Carolina
  - coordinates: 34°53′14″N 080°14′13″W
  - elevation: 370 ft (110 m)
- Mouth: Brown Creek
  - location: about 0.5 miles north of White Store, North Carolina
  - coordinates: 34°54′06″N 080°15′51″W
  - elevation: 292 ft (89 m)
- Length: 2.07 mi (3.33 km)
- Basin size: 1.62 square miles (4.2 km^{2})
- Discharge
  - location: Brown Creek
  - average: 1.96 cu ft/s (0.056 m^{3}/s) at mouth with Brown Creek

Basin features
- Progression: northwest
- River system: Pee Dee River
- Tributaries
  - left: unnamed tributaries
  - right: unnamed tributaries
- Bridges: Austin Road, White Store Road

Rushing Branch is a tributary of Brown Creek in Anson County, North Carolina. It originates near Becky Hill and flows northwest, eventually joining Brown Creek near White Store. The watershed is predominantly forested (83%), with 12% dedicated to agricultural use and the remaining area comprising other land uses.

== See also ==
- List of North Carolina rivers
