= 1956 United States presidential election in North Carolina =

- November 6, 1956

All 14 North Carolina votes to the Electoral College

Nominee	Adlai Stevenson	Dwight D. Eisenhower
Party	Democratic	Republican
Home state	Illinois	Pennsylvania (Note: Although he was born in Texas and grew up in Kansas before his military career, at the time of the 1952 election Eisenhower was president of Columbia University and was, officially, a resident of New York. During his first term as president, he moved his private residence to Gettysburg, Pennsylvania, and officially changed his residency to Pennsylvania.)
Running mate	Estes Kefauver	Richard Nixon
Electoral vote	14	0
Popular vote	590,530	575,062
Percentage	50.66%	49.34%

Stevenson
50–60%
60–70%
70–80%
80–90%
90–100%
Eisenhower
50–60%
60–70%
70–80%
80–90%
President before election
Dwight D. Eisenhower
Republican
Elected President
Dwight D. Eisenhower
Republican

The 1956 United States presidential election in North Carolina took place on November 6, 1956, as part of the 1956 United States presidential election. North Carolina voters chose 14 representatives, or electors, to the Electoral College, who voted for president and vice president.

As a former Confederate state, North Carolina had a history of Jim Crow laws, disfranchisement of its African-American population and dominance of the Democratic Party in state politics. However, unlike the Deep South, the Republican Party had sufficient historic Unionist white support from the mountains and northwestern Piedmont to gain one-third of the statewide vote total in most general elections, where turnout was higher than elsewhere in the former Confederacy due substantially to the state's early abolition of the poll tax in 1920. Like Virginia, Tennessee and Oklahoma, the relative strength of Republican opposition meant that North Carolina never had statewide white primaries, although certain counties did use a white primary until it was banned by Smith v. Allwright.

Following the banning of white primaries by the Supreme Court, North Carolina in 1948 offered less support to the Dixiecrat bolt than any other former Confederate state, due to the economic liberalism of its Black Belt and solid Democratic party discipline due to consistent Republican opposition. Although there was little satisfaction with Harry S. Truman during his second term, the loyalty of the white voters of the state's Black Belt and the previously anti-Al Smith Outer Banks meant that unlike Texas, Florida and Virginia, urban middle-class Republican voting was inadequate to carry North Carolina for Eisenhower.

During the 1940s and 1950s, the proportion of blacks registered to vote in the state increased steadily from less than ten percent to around twenty percent by the time of Brown v. Board of Education. Several Piedmont cities had blacks on their councils, although blacks in rural areas generally remained without hope of registering. The state would largely escape the overt “Massive Resistance” seen in neighbouring Virginia, and four of its congressmen did not sign the Southern Manifesto. Nonetheless, although the Greensboro school board voted 6–1 to desegregate within a day of Brown, no serious desegregation would take place until well into the 1960s, while two non-signers would be challenged and defeated in 1956 primaries. (Note: These were Charles B. Deane and Richard Thurmond Chatham.)

== Polls ==
Source	Rating	As of
The Daily Press	Safe D	September 29, 1956
The Daily Times-News	Safe D	October 26, 1956
Asheville Citizen-Times	Safe D	October 28, 1956
Fort Worth Star-Telegram	Safe D	November 2, 1956
Corpus Christi Times	Likely D	November 3, 1956
The Philadelphia Inquirer	Likely D	November 4, 1956
The Salt Lake Tribune	Likely D	November 4, 1956

== Results ==
1956 United States presidential election in North Carolina
Party	Candidate	Votes	%
Democratic	Adlai Stevenson	590,530	50.66%
Republican	Dwight D. Eisenhower (inc.)	575,062	49.34%
Total votes		1,165,592	100%

=== Results by county ===
County	Adlai Stevenson Democratic		Dwight D. Eisenhower Republican		Margin		Total
County	#	%	#	%	#	%	Total
Alamance	11,029	47.64%	12,123	52.36%	-1,094	-4.72%	23,152
Alexander	2,710	41.84%	3,767	58.16%	-1,057	-16.32%	6,477
Alleghany	1,670	49.57%	1,699	50.43%	-29	-0.86%	3,369
Anson	3,598	68.69%	1,640	31.31%	1,958	37.38%	5,238
Ashe	3,982	46.46%	4,588	53.54%	-606	-7.08%	8,570
Avery	969	19.47%	4,009	80.53%	-3,040	-61.06%	4,978
Beaufort	5,730	71.56%	2,277	28.44%	3,453	43.12%	8,007
Bertie	3,373	87.79%	469	12.21%	2,904	75.58%	3,842
Bladen	4,078	72.56%	1,542	27.44%	2,536	45.12%	5,620
Brunswick	3,297	49.98%	3,299	50.02%	-2	-0.04%	6,596
Buncombe	19,044	45.67%	22,655	54.33%	-3,611	-8.66%	41,699
Burke	7,999	40.35%	11,823	59.65%	-3,824	-19.30%	19,822
Cabarrus	7,173	33.15%	14,462	66.85%	-7,289	-33.70%	21,635
Caldwell	6,861	38.78%	10,833	61.22%	-3,972	-22.44%	17,694
Camden	813	70.33%	343	29.67%	470	40.66%	1,156
Carteret	3,875	50.46%	3,804	49.54%	71	0.92%	7,679
Caswell	2,468	67.21%	1,204	32.79%	1,264	34.42%	3,672
Catawba	11,424	37.25%	19,246	62.75%	-7,822	-25.50%	30,670
Chatham	4,151	52.68%	3,729	47.32%	422	5.36%	7,880
Cherokee	2,843	42.60%	3,830	57.40%	-987	-14.80%	6,673
Chowan	1,485	72.76%	556	27.24%	929	45.52%	2,041
Clay	1,287	47.16%	1,442	52.84%	-155	-5.68%	2,729
Cleveland	8,408	54.30%	7,076	45.70%	1,332	8.60%	15,484
Columbus	7,805	77.24%	2,300	22.76%	5,505	54.48%	10,105
Craven	6,317	68.12%	2,956	31.88%	3,361	36.24%	9,273
Cumberland	8,862	56.95%	6,699	43.05%	2,163	13.90%	15,561
Currituck	1,425	74.49%	488	25.51%	937	48.98%	1,913
Dare	839	44.94%	1,028	55.06%	-189	-10.12%	1,867
Davidson	9,987	38.17%	16,178	61.83%	-6,191	-23.66%	26,165
Davie	2,110	31.45%	4,599	68.55%	-2,489	-37.10%	6,709
Duplin	6,931	76.66%	2,110	23.34%	4,821	53.32%	9,041
Durham	13,835	51.13%	13,226	48.87%	609	2.26%	27,061
Edgecombe	7,830	80.97%	1,840	19.03%	5,990	61.94%	9,670
Forsyth	15,819	35.01%	29,368	64.99%	-13,549	-29.98%	45,187
Franklin	5,298	87.00%	792	13.00%	4,506	74.00%	6,090
Gaston	15,671	46.32%	18,159	53.68%	-2,488	-7.36%	33,830
Gates	1,244	78.49%	341	21.51%	903	56.98%	1,585
Graham	1,486	45.75%	1,762	54.25%	-276	-8.50%	3,248
Granville	4,013	73.28%	1,463	26.72%	2,550	46.56%	5,476
Greene	3,285	93.67%	222	6.33%	3,063	87.34%	3,507
Guilford	21,948	40.13%	32,751	59.87%	-10,803	-19.74%	54,699
Halifax	7,860	77.01%	2,346	22.99%	5,514	54.02%	10,206
Harnett	7,421	64.99%	3,998	35.01%	3,423	29.98%	11,419
Haywood	7,598	52.21%	6,955	47.79%	643	4.42%	14,553
Henderson	4,003	30.22%	9,243	69.78%	-5,240	-39.56%	13,246
Hertford	2,708	78.79%	729	21.21%	1,979	57.58%	3,437
Hoke	1,944	79.12%	513	20.88%	1,431	58.24%	2,457
Hyde	1,028	67.68%	491	32.32%	537	35.36%	1,519
Iredell	7,286	39.57%	11,125	60.43%	-3,839	-20.86%	18,411
Jackson	3,787	51.95%	3,503	48.05%	284	3.90%	7,290
Johnston	9,852	66.82%	4,893	33.18%	4,959	33.64%	14,745
Jones	1,952	82.47%	415	17.53%	1,537	64.94%	2,367
Lee	4,163	68.12%	1,948	31.88%	2,215	36.24%	6,111
Lenoir	6,847	72.76%	2,564	27.24%	4,283	45.52%	9,411
Lincoln	5,838	46.80%	6,637	53.20%	-799	-6.40%	12,475
Macon	3,025	47.02%	3,408	52.98%	-383	-5.96%	6,433
Madison	3,693	46.42%	4,263	53.58%	-570	-7.16%	7,956
Martin	5,730	92.73%	449	7.27%	5,281	85.46%	6,179
McDowell	4,392	44.54%	5,468	55.46%	-1,076	-10.92%	9,860
Mecklenburg	27,227	37.98%	44,469	62.02%	-17,242	-24.04%	71,696
Mitchell	1,069	20.03%	4,269	79.97%	-3,200	-59.94%	5,338
Montgomery	3,088	47.90%	3,359	52.10%	-271	-4.20%	6,447
Moore	4,729	47.45%	5,238	52.55%	-509	-5.10%	9,967
Nash	9,969	78.91%	2,665	21.09%	7,304	57.82%	12,634
New Hanover	10,247	51.97%	9,470	48.03%	777	3.94%	19,717
Northampton	4,242	85.03%	747	14.97%	3,495	70.06%	4,989
Onslow	4,692	74.26%	1,626	25.74%	3,066	48.52%	6,318
Orange	4,743	51.90%	4,396	48.10%	347	3.80%	9,139
Pamlico	1,376	59.06%	954	40.94%	422	18.12%	2,330
Pasquotank	2,963	61.86%	1,827	38.14%	1,136	23.72%	4,790
Pender	2,196	68.52%	1,009	31.48%	1,187	37.04%	3,205
Perquimans	1,022	59.04%	709	40.96%	313	18.08%	1,731
Person	3,433	66.36%	1,740	33.64%	1,693	32.72%	5,173
Pitt	11,873	82.52%	2,515	17.48%	9,358	65.04%	14,388
Polk	2,527	47.23%	2,823	52.77%	-296	-5.54%	5,350
Randolph	8,404	38.95%	13,174	61.05%	-4,770	-22.10%	21,578
Richmond	6,592	69.40%	2,907	30.60%	3,685	38.80%	9,499
Robeson	10,516	79.06%	2,785	20.94%	7,731	58.12%	13,301
Rockingham	8,896	49.73%	8,991	50.27%	-95	-0.54%	17,887
Rowan	9,761	35.72%	17,562	64.28%	-7,801	-28.56%	27,323
Rutherford	7,208	46.78%	8,200	53.22%	-992	-6.44%	15,408
Sampson	7,197	51.84%	6,685	48.16%	512	3.68%	13,882
Scotland	3,042	72.21%	1,171	27.79%	1,871	44.42%	4,213
Stanly	6,693	38.55%	10,667	61.45%	-3,974	-22.90%	17,360
Stokes	3,948	47.63%	4,341	52.37%	-393	-4.74%	8,289
Surry	7,020	43.82%	9,001	56.18%	-1,981	-12.36%	16,021
Swain	1,794	46.96%	2,026	53.04%	-232	-6.08%	3,820
Transylvania	3,435	46.82%	3,901	53.18%	-466	-6.36%	7,336
Tyrrell	615	59.42%	420	40.58%	195	18.84%	1,035
Union	6,383	65.50%	3,362	34.50%	3,021	31.00%	9,745
Vance	4,922	71.57%	1,955	28.43%	2,967	43.14%	6,877
Wake	22,427	59.61%	15,194	40.39%	7,233	19.22%	37,621
Warren	2,733	79.19%	718	20.81%	2,015	58.38%	3,451
Washington	1,947	65.34%	1,033	34.66%	914	30.68%	2,980
Watauga	3,223	41.01%	4,636	58.99%	-1,413	-17.98%	7,859
Wayne	6,756	61.55%	4,220	38.45%	2,536	23.10%	10,976
Wilkes	5,870	33.71%	11,544	66.29%	-5,674	-32.58%	17,414
Wilson	8,328	74.64%	2,830	25.36%	5,498	49.28%	11,158
Yadkin	2,361	30.15%	5,469	69.85%	-3,108	-39.70%	7,830
Yancey	2,964	51.35%	2,808	48.65%	156	2.70%	5,772
Totals	590,530	50.66%	575,062	49.34%	15,468	1.32%	1,165,592

==== Counties that flipped from Democratic to Republican ====
- Alleghany
- Alamance
- Dare
- Cherokee
- Graham
- Macon
- McDowell
- Polk
- Rockingham
- Stokes
- Surry
- Swain

== Analysis ==
North Carolina was carried by Democratic nominee Adlai Stevenson of Illinois, with 50.66 percent of the popular vote, over incumbent Republican President Dwight D. Eisenhower’s 49.34 percent. As in 1952, the key to Stevenson's victory was the powerful loyalty of Black Belt and Outer Banks white voters. The east–west partisan split seen in 1928 and 1952 became so consistent that Stevenson won only four counties in the western bloc — with Eisenhower's gain vis-à-vis 1952 of around 6 points concentrated in traditionally Democratic mountain and Piedmont counties — but in the coastal plain Eisenhower won only Dare and Brunswick Counties. Critical help for Stevenson also came from gaining a much larger proportion of the growing urban black electorate than elsewhere in the Confederacy. (Note: It is estimated that Eisenhower gained under forty percent of black voters in major North Carolina cities, whereas he gained over seventy percent in Atlanta and Richmond and over half in Memphis.) This was the last time until 1992 that North Carolina would vote for the losing candidate in a presidential election, and is also the last time that a Republican has won the presidency without carrying North Carolina.
