= Black Jack Branch (Brown Creek tributary) =

Stream in North Carolina, USA

Black Jack Branch Tributary to Brown Creek
- Location of Black Jack Branch mouth

Location
- Country: United States
- State: North Carolina
- Counties: Anson (NC); Union (NC)

Physical characteristics
- Source: divide between Brown Creek and Lanes Creek
  - location: about 0.25 miles northeast of Sturdivants Crossroads, North Carolina
  - coordinates: 34°54′51″N 080°19′19″W
  - elevation: 440 ft (130 m)
- Mouth: Brown Creek
  - location: about 3 miles east of Sturdivants Crossroads, North Carolina
  - coordinates: 34°55′01″N 080°15′53″W
  - elevation: 285 ft (87 m)
- Length: 3.89 mi (6.26 km)
- Basin size: 4.17 square miles (10.8 km^{2})
- Discharge
  - location: Brown Creek
  - average: 4.90 cu ft/s (0.139 m^{3}/s) at mouth with Brown Creek

Basin features
- Progression: generally east
- River system: Pee Dee River
- Tributaries
  - left: unnamed tributaries
  - right: unnamed tributaries
- Bridges: High Ridge Church Road; Griffins Shortcut Road; Lower White Store Road

Black Jack Branch is a tributary of Brown Creek in south-central North Carolina that drains Union County, North Carolina and Anson County, North Carolina.

Browns Creek rises near Sturdivants Crossroads, North Carolina and follows an easterly path to Brown Creek in the Wadesboro Triassic Basin.

== See also ==
- List of North Carolina rivers
