= Cabin Branch (Brown Creek tributary) =

Stream in North Carolina, US

Cabin Branch Tributary to Brown Creek
- Location of Cabin Branch mouth Cabin Branch (Brown Creek tributary) (the United States)

Location
- Country: United States
- State: North Carolina
- County: Anson

Physical characteristics
- Source: divide between Cabin Branch and Lanes Creek
  - location: pond at Sugar Town, North Carolina
  - coordinates: 35°02′25″N 080°11′17″W
  - elevation: 392 ft (119 m)
- Mouth: Brown Creek
  - location: about 4 miles southwest of Ansonville, North Carolina
  - coordinates: 35°03′13″N 080°07′59″W
  - elevation: 221 ft (67 m)
- Length: 4.90 mi (7.89 km)
- Basin size: 4.33 square miles (11.2 km^{2})
- Discharge
  - location: Brown Creek
  - average: 5.00 cu ft/s (0.142 m^{3}/s) at mouth with Brown Creek

Basin features
- Progression: generally east
- River system: Pee Dee River
- Tributaries
  - left: unnamed tributaries
  - right: unnamed tributaries
- Bridges: Ansonville-Polkton Road, NC 742, Red Hill-Mt. Vernon Road, Jacks Branch Road

Cabin Branch is a 4.90 mi (7.89 km) long 1st order tributary to Brown Creek in Anson County, North Carolina.

== Course ==
Cabin Branch rises in a pond at Sugar Town, North Carolina. Cabin Branch then flows easterly to meet Brown Creek about 4 miles southwest of Ansonville, North Carolina.

== Watershed ==
Cabin Branch drains 4.33 square miles (11.2 km^{2}) of area, receives about 47.9 in/year of precipitation, has a topographic wetness index of 419.27 and is about 30% forested.
