= 1960 United States presidential election in North Carolina =

- November 8, 1960

All 14 North Carolina votes to the Electoral College

Nominee	John F. Kennedy	Richard Nixon
Party	Democratic	Republican
Home state	Massachusetts	California
Running mate	Lyndon B. Johnson	Henry Cabot Lodge Jr.
Electoral vote	14	0
Popular vote	713,136	655,420
Percentage	52.11%	47.89%

Kennedy
50–60%
60–70%
70–80%
80–90%
Nixon
50–60%
60–70%
70–80%
80–90%
President before election
Dwight D. Eisenhower
Republican
Elected President
John F. Kennedy
Democratic

The 1960 United States presidential election in North Carolina took place on November 8, 1960, as part of the 1960 United States presidential election. North Carolina voters chose 14 representatives, or electors, to the Electoral College, who voted for president and vice president.

As a former Confederate state, North Carolina had a history of Jim Crow laws, disfranchisement of its African-American population and dominance of the Democratic Party in state politics. However, unlike the Deep South, the Republican Party always had sufficient historic Unionist white support from the mountains and northwestern Piedmont to gain minimally one-quarter and usually one-third of the statewide vote in general elections, where turnout was higher than elsewhere in the former Confederacy due substantially to the state's early abolition of the poll tax in 1920. Like Virginia, Tennessee and Oklahoma, the relative strength of Republican opposition meant that North Carolina never had statewide white primaries, although certain counties did use a white primary until it was banned by Smith v. Allwright.

Following the banning of white primaries by the Supreme Court, North Carolina in 1948 offered less support to the Dixiecrat bolt than any other former Confederate state, due to the economic liberalism of its Black Belt and solid Democratic party discipline due to consistent Republican opposition. Although there was little satisfaction with Harry S. Truman during his second term, the loyalty of the white voters of the state's Black Belt and the previously anti-Al Smith Outer Banks meant that unlike Texas, Florida and Virginia, urban middle-class Republican voting was inadequate to carry North Carolina for Dwight D. Eisenhower in either 1952 or 1956. Aiding this failure was that the growing urban black electorate, which had increased from under ten percent of voting-age blacks in 1940 to about a quarter in 1956, was much more favourable to Adlai Stevenson II than in other former Confederate states. (Note: It is estimated that in 1956 Eisenhower gained under forty percent of black voters in major North Carolina cities, whereas he gained over seventy percent in Atlanta and Richmond and over half in Memphis.) In the 1958 midterm elections, Republicans in the state legislature were reduced to their lowest ever representation of five seats, although Charles R. Jonas did hold the Tenth District.

North Carolina would largely escape the overt “Massive Resistance” seen in neighbouring Virginia, and four of its congressmen did not sign the Southern Manifesto. Nonetheless, although the Greensboro school board voted 6–1 to desegregate within a day of Brown, no serious desegregation would occur until well into the 1960s, while two non-signers would be challenged and defeated in 1956 primaries. (Note: These were Charles B. Deane and Richard Thurmond Chatham.) With the likely nomination of Massachusetts Senator John F. Kennedy to counter Eisenhower's Catholic appeal in the Northeast, speculation emerged that the anti-Catholicism that turned North Carolina Republican in 1928 would again become a powerful force, and many Baptist pastors in the state did raise the religious issue.

During 1960, the state would be affected by the Greensboro sit-ins. Dissatisfaction with the Democratic Party on civil rights, as well as support for him amongst certain anti-Catholic groups, meant that incumbent vice-president and Republican nominee Richard Nixon gained an enthusiastic reception when touring the state early in his fall campaign. Polls in mid-October however favoured Kennedy, and they continued to do so in the fourth week of the month.

== Results ==
1960 United States presidential election in North Carolina
Party	Candidate	Votes	%
Democratic	John F. Kennedy	713,136	52.11%
Republican	Richard Nixon	655,420	47.89%
Total votes		1,368,556	100.00%

=== Results by county ===
County	John F. Kennedy Democratic		Richard Nixon Republican		Margin		Total
County	#	%	#	%	#	%	Total
Alamance	13,599	47.86%	14,818	52.14%	-1,219	-4.28%	28,417
Alexander	3,956	48.65%	4,175	51.35%	-219	-2.70%	8,131
Alleghany	2,121	51.74%	1,978	48.26%	143	3.48%	4,099
Anson	4,120	72.07%	1,597	27.93%	2,523	44.14%	5,717
Ashe	4,477	48.14%	4,823	51.86%	-346	-3.72%	9,300
Avery	1,047	20.05%	4,176	79.95%	-3,129	-59.90%	5,223
Beaufort	6,039	69.15%	2,694	30.85%	3,345	38.30%	8,733
Bertie	3,682	86.45%	577	13.55%	3,105	72.90%	4,259
Bladen	4,353	70.13%	1,854	29.87%	2,499	40.26%	6,207
Brunswick	4,305	59.63%	2,915	40.37%	1,390	19.26%	7,220
Buncombe	23,303	45.39%	28,040	54.61%	-4,737	-9.22%	51,343
Burke	10,015	43.66%	12,925	56.34%	-2,910	-12.68%	22,940
Cabarrus	8,680	35.64%	15,678	64.36%	-6,998	-28.72%	24,358
Caldwell	8,722	43.02%	11,553	56.98%	-2,831	-13.96%	20,275
Camden	1,014	75.00%	338	25.00%	676	50.00%	1,352
Carteret	5,264	53.95%	4,493	46.05%	771	7.90%	9,757
Caswell	2,832	69.01%	1,272	30.99%	1,560	38.02%	4,104
Catawba	13,491	41.35%	19,135	58.65%	-5,644	-17.30%	32,626
Chatham	4,683	52.09%	4,308	47.91%	375	4.18%	8,991
Cherokee	3,197	42.68%	4,294	57.32%	-1,097	-14.64%	7,491
Chowan	1,920	78.27%	533	21.73%	1,387	56.54%	2,453
Clay	1,264	43.27%	1,657	56.73%	-393	-13.46%	2,921
Cleveland	10,545	56.08%	8,257	43.92%	2,288	12.16%	18,802
Columbus	10,455	74.10%	3,655	25.90%	6,800	48.20%	14,110
Craven	7,158	66.05%	3,680	33.95%	3,478	32.10%	10,838
Cumberland	11,601	58.97%	8,072	41.03%	3,529	17.94%	19,673
Currituck	1,651	78.06%	464	21.94%	1,187	56.12%	2,115
Dare	1,247	54.10%	1,058	45.90%	189	8.20%	2,305
Davidson	13,118	41.10%	18,797	58.90%	-5,679	-17.80%	31,915
Davie	2,471	34.04%	4,788	65.96%	-2,317	-31.92%	7,259
Duplin	7,269	71.11%	2,953	28.89%	4,316	42.22%	10,222
Durham	19,298	57.40%	14,322	42.60%	4,976	14.80%	33,620
Edgecombe	8,046	77.93%	2,279	22.07%	5,767	55.86%	10,325
Forsyth	24,035	41.87%	33,374	58.13%	-9,339	-16.26%	57,409
Franklin	5,081	82.10%	1,108	17.90%	3,973	64.20%	6,189
Gaston	20,104	48.61%	21,250	51.39%	-1,146	-2.78%	41,354
Gates	1,549	80.09%	385	19.91%	1,164	60.18%	1,934
Graham	1,335	43.68%	1,721	56.32%	-386	-12.64%	3,056
Granville	4,945	73.34%	1,798	26.66%	3,147	46.68%	6,743
Greene	3,092	87.27%	451	12.73%	2,641	74.54%	3,543
Guilford	30,486	42.43%	41,357	57.57%	-10,871	-15.14%	71,843
Halifax	8,872	79.11%	2,343	20.89%	6,529	58.22%	11,215
Harnett	7,892	59.82%	5,301	40.18%	2,591	19.64%	13,193
Haywood	8,044	48.38%	8,583	51.62%	-539	-3.24%	16,627
Henderson	4,611	29.85%	10,835	70.15%	-6,224	-40.30%	15,446
Hertford	3,105	79.90%	781	20.10%	2,324	59.80%	3,886
Hoke	2,106	77.94%	596	22.06%	1,510	55.88%	2,702
Hyde	1,147	70.45%	481	29.55%	666	40.90%	1,628
Iredell	8,973	42.61%	12,085	57.39%	-3,112	-14.78%	21,058
Jackson	3,900	49.26%	4,017	50.74%	-117	-1.48%	7,917
Johnston	9,914	59.82%	6,660	40.18%	3,254	19.64%	16,574
Jones	1,920	76.65%	585	23.35%	1,335	53.30%	2,505
Lee	4,673	64.58%	2,563	35.42%	2,110	29.16%	7,236
Lenoir	8,126	68.96%	3,658	31.04%	4,468	37.92%	11,784
Lincoln	6,728	49.68%	6,816	50.32%	-88	-0.64%	13,544
Macon	3,098	45.34%	3,735	54.66%	-637	-9.32%	6,833
Madison	4,546	50.69%	4,422	49.31%	124	1.38%	8,968
Martin	5,826	88.77%	737	11.23%	5,089	77.54%	6,563
McDowell	4,889	44.30%	6,148	55.70%	-1,259	-11.40%	11,037
Mecklenburg	39,362	44.93%	48,250	55.07%	-8,888	-10.14%	87,612
Mitchell	1,174	19.55%	4,831	80.45%	-3,657	-60.90%	6,005
Montgomery	3,297	47.47%	3,649	52.53%	-352	-5.06%	6,946
Moore	5,548	48.83%	5,815	51.17%	-267	-2.34%	11,363
Nash	10,086	72.14%	3,896	27.86%	6,190	44.28%	13,982
New Hanover	13,182	57.42%	9,775	42.58%	3,407	14.84%	22,957
Northampton	4,756	87.52%	678	12.48%	4,078	75.04%	5,434
Onslow	5,564	66.43%	2,812	33.57%	2,752	32.86%	8,376
Orange	7,180	57.85%	5,231	42.15%	1,949	15.70%	12,411
Pamlico	1,697	61.53%	1,061	38.47%	636	23.06%	2,758
Pasquotank	4,530	71.26%	1,827	28.74%	2,703	42.52%	6,357
Pender	2,744	68.29%	1,274	31.71%	1,470	36.58%	4,018
Perquimans	1,460	69.62%	637	30.38%	823	39.24%	2,097
Person	4,305	69.09%	1,926	30.91%	2,379	38.18%	6,231
Pitt	12,526	78.37%	3,458	21.63%	9,068	56.74%	15,984
Polk	2,762	49.16%	2,856	50.84%	-94	-1.68%	5,618
Randolph	9,789	38.30%	15,772	61.70%	-5,983	-23.40%	25,561
Richmond	8,293	71.63%	3,285	28.37%	5,008	43.26%	11,578
Robeson	11,623	76.45%	3,580	23.55%	8,043	52.90%	15,203
Rockingham	11,207	54.24%	9,456	45.76%	1,751	8.48%	20,663
Rowan	12,919	42.16%	17,726	57.84%	-4,807	-15.68%	30,645
Rutherford	8,554	48.75%	8,993	51.25%	-439	-2.50%	17,547
Sampson	7,632	50.98%	7,338	49.02%	294	1.96%	14,970
Scotland	3,643	74.01%	1,279	25.99%	2,364	48.02%	4,922
Stanly	8,259	42.71%	11,080	57.29%	-2,821	-14.58%	19,339
Stokes	4,487	47.94%	4,872	52.06%	-385	-4.12%	9,359
Surry	8,185	44.92%	10,035	55.08%	-1,850	-10.16%	18,220
Swain	2,171	50.69%	2,112	49.31%	59	1.38%	4,283
Transylvania	3,388	44.53%	4,221	55.47%	-833	-10.94%	7,609
Tyrrell	926	72.63%	349	27.37%	577	45.26%	1,275
Union	7,393	64.72%	4,030	35.28%	3,363	29.44%	11,423
Vance	5,694	73.89%	2,012	26.11%	3,682	47.78%	7,706
Wake	26,050	58.56%	18,436	41.44%	7,614	17.12%	44,486
Warren	2,997	80.69%	717	19.31%	2,280	61.38%	3,714
Washington	2,415	70.16%	1,027	29.84%	1,388	40.32%	3,442
Watauga	3,440	40.66%	5,020	59.34%	-1,580	-18.68%	8,460
Wayne	7,856	58.93%	5,474	41.07%	2,382	17.86%	13,330
Wilkes	7,986	38.02%	13,016	61.98%	-5,030	-23.96%	21,002
Wilson	8,021	72.03%	3,114	27.97%	4,907	44.06%	11,135
Yadkin	2,785	27.70%	7,268	72.30%	-4,483	-44.60%	10,053
Yancey	3,310	50.20%	3,284	49.80%	26	0.40%	6,594
Totals	713,136	52.11%	655,420	47.89%	57,716	4.22%	1,368,556

==== Counties that flipped from Republican to Democratic ====
- Alleghany
- Brunswick
- Dare
- Madison
- Rockingham
- Swain

==== Counties that flipped from Democratic to Republican ====
- Haywood
- Jackson

== Analysis ==
North Carolina was won by Kennedy (D–Massachusetts), running with Senator Lyndon B. Johnson, with 52.11 percent of the popular vote against Nixon's 47.89 percent.

Despite suspected hostility in the state towards Kennedy's Catholicism, only in the traditionally Democratic parts of Appalachia and the previously extremely solid eastern part of the state did Kennedy decline upon Adlai Stevenson II’s 1956 performance, whilst Kennedy even gained in the Outer Banks where 1928 anti-Catholicism had been strongest. At the same time, the collapse of a long-standing political machine during the 1950s meant that Madison County, previously one of the strongest Republican bastions in the state, voted Democratic for the first time since 1876, whilst nearby Haywood County and Jackson County were the only counties to flip from Stevenson to Nixon.

Kennedy was helped crucially by the increasing black voter registration that was totalling almost a third of the voting-age black population at the time of the election: it is estimated he received about seven-eighths of black voters in the urban precincts where they were concentrated, producing a substantial part of his sixty thousand vote statewide majority.

This is the last time Mecklenburg County would vote for a Republican that would lose North Carolina's electoral votes.
