= Pee Dee National Wildlife Refuge =

National Wildlife Refuge in North Carolina, United States

- IUCN category IV (habitat/species management area)
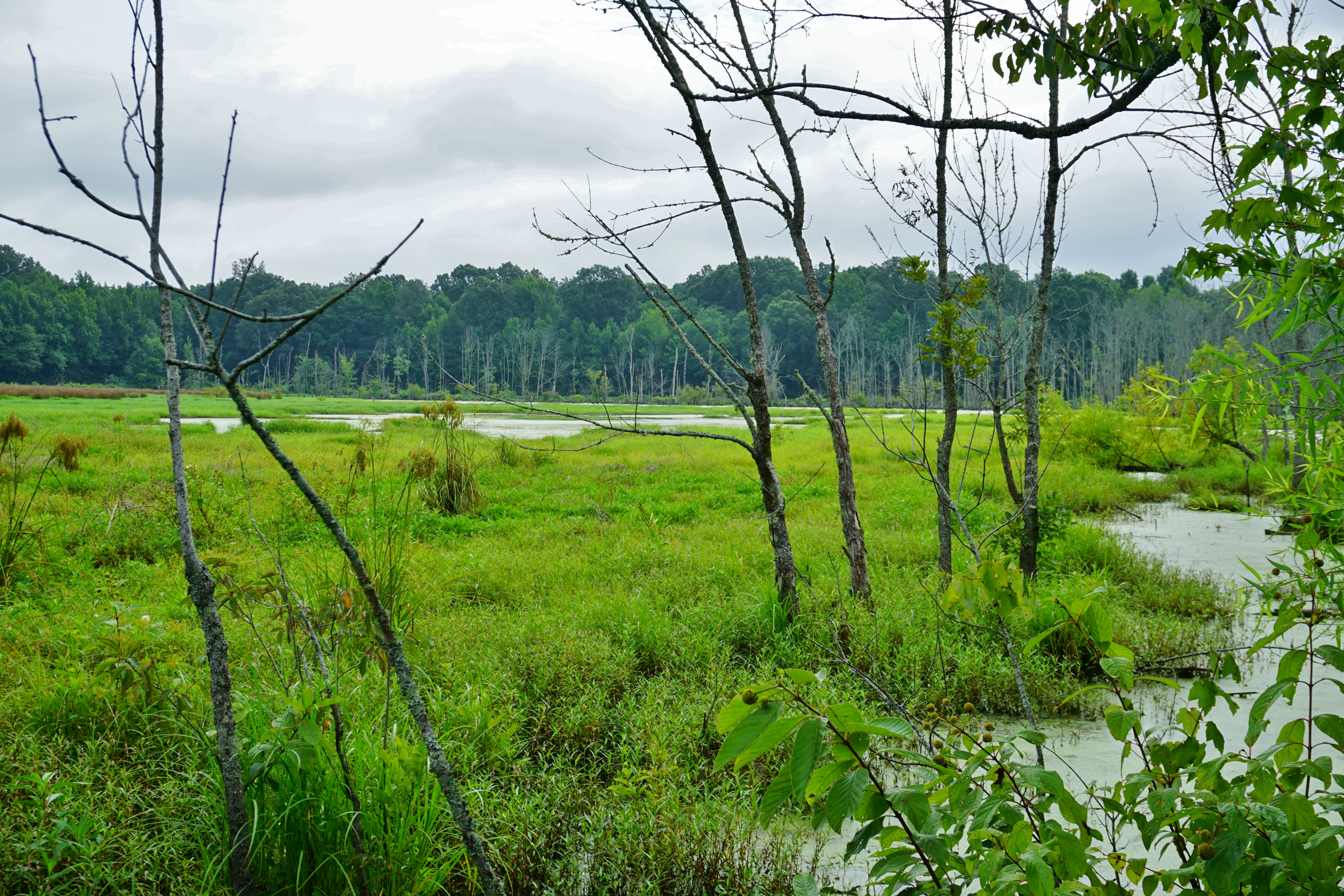
- Wetlands at the refuge

- Location within the United States Location within North Carolina
- Location: Anson, Richmond counties, North Carolina, United States
- Nearest city: Ansonville, North Carolina
- Coordinates: 35°05′01″N 80°02′59″W
- Area: 8,443 acres (34.17 km^{2})
- Established: 1963
- Governing body: U.S. Fish and Wildlife Service
- Website: Pee Dee National Wildlife Refuge

Situated along the Pee Dee River, Pee Dee National Wildlife Refuge contains 8,443 acres (34.17 km^{2}) in Anson and Richmond Counties, North Carolina. The refuge was established in October 1963 to provide wintering habitat for geese and other migratory waterfowl (mostly mallard, ring-necked and wood ducks).

Cooperative farming in field impoundments, water level management, and the bottomland hardwood forest along Brown Creek provide excellent habitat for waterfowl and other wildlife. Wintering waterfowl numbers fluctuate greatly, but can exceed 10,000 birds yearly. The refuge also supports a small population of wintering Southern James Bay Canada geese. Local numbers of wintering migratory geese have dwindled in recent years, but the refuge remains an important wintering area for the remaining geese and thousands of ducks. Pee Dee Refuge is a few hundred yards from the private Lockhart Gaddy Wild Goose Refuge. In the 1950s, Gaddy's pond wintered more than 10,000 Canada geese a year.

The refuge also supports an abundance of nesting neotropical migratory birds, bobwhite quail, wild turkey, raccoon, bobcat, opossum and white-tailed deer. The diversity of habitat and management provides for more than 168 bird species, 49 reptiles and amphibians, 28 mammals, and 20 fish species. Refuge lands include the following habitat types: bottomland hardwood forest (3,000 acres (12 km^{2})), upland pine forest (1,500 acres (6.1 km^{2})), mixed pine/hardwood forest (2,000 acres (8.1 km^{2})), crop lands (1,000 acres (4.0 km^{2})), old fields, native warm season grasslands, and openings (1,000 acres (4.0 km^{2})).
