= Billy Horne Farm =

Historic farm in North Carolina, United States

- U.S. National Register of Historic Places
- U.S. Historic district
- Location within North Carolina Location within the United States
- Location: NC 1246, 0.5 miles (0.80 km) west of the junction with NC 1240, near Polkton, North Carolina
- Coordinates: 34°56′24″N 80°15′18″W
- Area: 241.3 acres (97.7 ha)
- Built: c. 1830
- Architectural style: Greek Revival, Vernacular Greek Revival
- NRHP reference No.: 89000496
- Added to NRHP: June 9, 1989

The Billy Horne Farm is a historic farm and national historic district located near Polkton, Anson County, North Carolina. It includes four contributing buildings and two contributing sites. They include a two-story weatherboard frame house in the Federal and vernacular Greek Revival style (c. 1830); a 19th-century frame overseer / tenant house; a 19th-century corncrib / granary; a 19th-century carriage house; the farm landscape; and the Horne Family Cemetery.

It was listed on the National Register of Historic Places in 1989.
