= Pinch Gut Creek (Brown Creek tributary) =

Stream in North Carolina, USA

Pinch Gut Creek Tributary to Brown Creek
- Location of Pinch Gut Creek mouth

Location
- Country: United States
- State: North Carolina
- County: Anson

Physical characteristics
- Source: divide between Pinch Gut Creek and Little Brown Creek
  - location: about 5 miles southeast of Polkton, North Carolina
  - coordinates: 34°56′31″N 080°09′27″W
  - elevation: 380 ft (120 m)
- Mouth: Brown Creek
  - location: about 1.5 miles east of Polkton, North Carolina
  - coordinates: 35°00′58″N 080°09′03″W
  - elevation: 243 ft (74 m)
- Length: 5.57 mi (8.96 km)
- Basin size: 8.84 square miles (22.9 km^{2})
- Discharge
  - location: Brown Creek
  - average: 9.87 cu ft/s (0.279 m^{3}/s) at mouth with Brown Creek

Basin features
- Progression: north
- River system: Pee Dee River
- Tributaries
  - left: unnamed tributaries
  - right: unnamed tributaries
- Bridges: Ridge Path Road, US 74

Pinch Gut Creek is a tributary of Brown Creek in Anson County, North Carolina that rises southeast of Polkton, North Carolina and then flows south to meet Brown Creek east of Polkton. The watershed is about 70% forested, 23% agricultural and the rest is of other land uses.

== See also ==
- List of North Carolina rivers
