= Ansonville =

Ansonville may refer to:

- Ansonville, North Carolina, United States
- Ansonville, now part of Iroquois Falls, Ontario, Canada
