= Little Brown Creek (Brown Creek tributary, right bank) =

Stream in North Carolina, USA

Little Brown Creek Tributary to Brown Creek on the right bank
- Location of Little Brown Creek mouth Little Brown Creek (Brown Creek tributary, right bank) (the United States)

Location
- Country: United States
- State: North Carolina
- County: Anson

Physical characteristics
- Source: divide between Little Brown Creek and Middle Fork Jones Creek
  - location: pond about 3 miles northeast of Lowry, North Carolina
  - coordinates: 34°54′01″N 080°09′28″W
  - elevation: 505 ft (154 m)
- Mouth: Brown Creek
  - location: about 0.5 miles southeast of Polkton, North Carolina
  - coordinates: 35°00′07″N 080°11′04″W
  - elevation: 243 ft (74 m)
- Length: 8.79 mi (14.15 km)
- Basin size: 15.42 square miles (39.9 km^{2})
- Discharge
  - location: Brown Creek
  - average: 17.06 cu ft/s (0.483 m^{3}/s) at mouth with Brown Creek

Basin features
- Progression: generally north
- River system: Pee Dee River
- Tributaries
  - left: unnamed tributaries
  - right: Leggett Branch
- Bridges: White Store Road, Mills Road, US 74

Little Brown Creek is a 8.79 mi (14.15 km) long 3rd order tributary to Brown Creek in Anson County, North Carolina. This creek is located on the right bank of Brown Creek and is different from the one on the left bank located upstream.

== Course ==
Little Brown Creek rises in a pond about 3 miles north of Lowry, North Carolina. Little Brown Creek then flows north to meet Brown Creek about 0.5 miles southeast of Polkton, North Carolina.

== Watershed ==
Little Brown Creek drains 15.42 square miles (39.9 km^{2}) of area, receives about 48.0 in/year of precipitation, has a topographic wetness index of 432.95 and is about 69% forested.
