= Burnsville Township, Anson County, North Carolina =

Coordinates: 35.10677°N 80.24098°W

- Township
- Location of Burnsville Township in Anson County

- Location of Anson County in North Carolina
- Country: United States
- State: North Carolina
- County: Anson

Area
  - Total: 48.93 sq mi (126.72 km^{2})
- Highest elevation (high point at center of township): 618 ft (188 m)
- Lowest elevation (Lanes Creek at the northeastern end of the township): 214 ft (65 m)

Population (2010)
  - Total: 1,942
  - Density: 39.69/sq mi (15.32/km^{2})
- Time zone: UTC-4 (EST)
  - Summer (DST): UTC-5 (EDT)
- Area code: 704

Burnsville Township, population 1,942, is one of eight townships in Anson County, North Carolina. Burnsville Township is 48.93 square miles (126.7 km^{2}) in size and is located in northwestern Anson County. This township does not have any cities or towns within it.

== Geography ==
Burnsville Township is bounded by the Rocky River on the north and Lanes Creek on the east. Two tributaries to the Rocky River are in Burnsville Township and include Cribs Creek and Richardson Creek.
