= Lilesville, North Carolina =

- Town
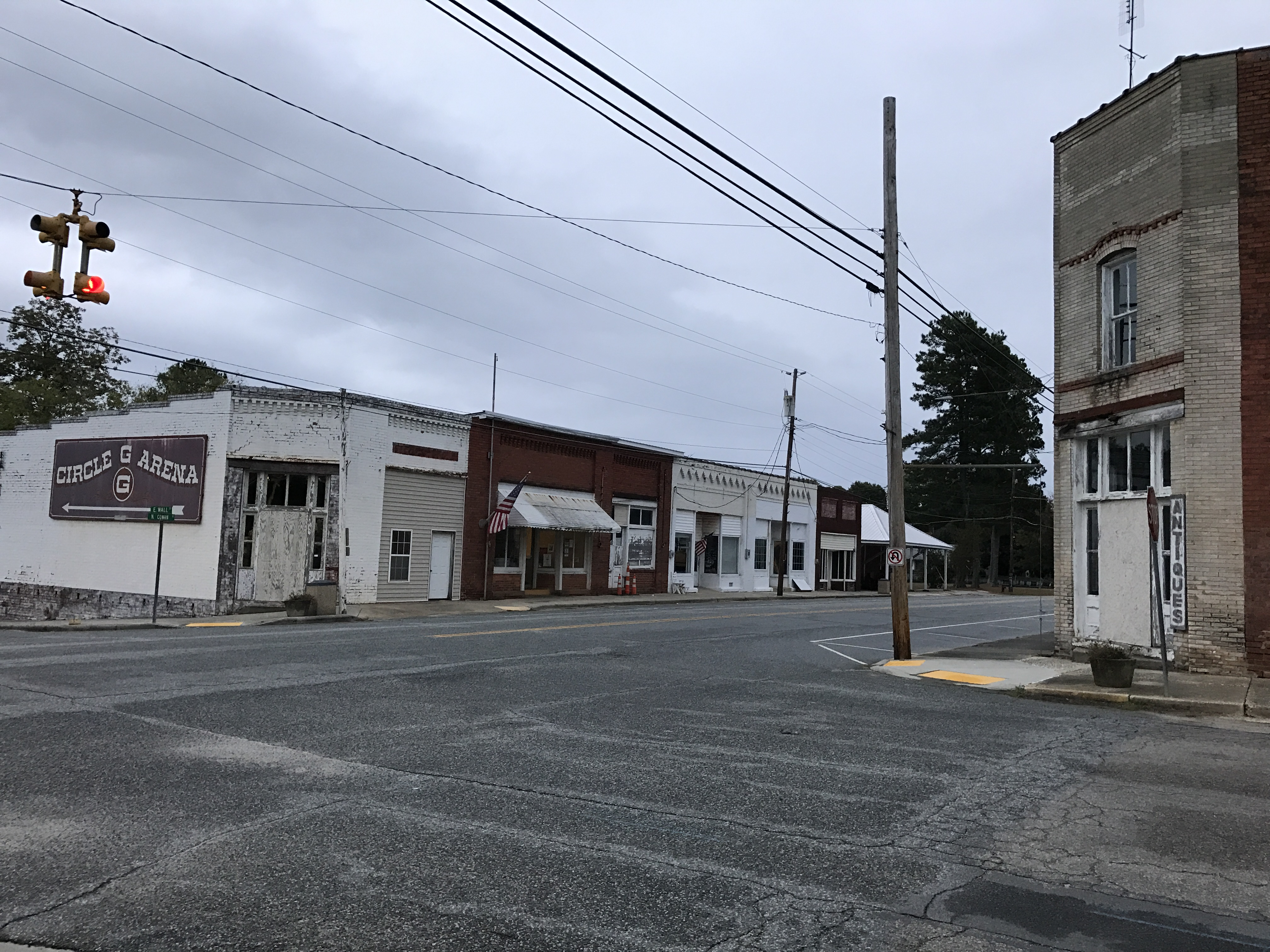
- West Wall Street in 2019

- Location within the state of North Carolina
- Coordinates: 34°58′03″N 79°59′04″W
- Country: United States
- State: North Carolina
- County: Anson
- Founded: 1827
- Incorporated: 1874
- Named after: Nelson P. Liles

Area
  - Total: 0.99 sq mi (2.57 km^{2})
  - Land: 0.99 sq mi (2.57 km^{2})
  - Water: 0 sq mi (0.00 km^{2})
- Elevation: 502 ft (153 m)

Population (2020)
  - Total: 395
  - Density: 397.7/sq mi (153.56/km^{2})
- Time zone: UTC-5 (Eastern (EST))
  - Summer (DST): UTC-4 (EDT)
- ZIP code: 28091
- Area code: 704
- FIPS code: 37-38200
- GNIS feature ID: 2406019
- Website: www.lilesvilletown.com

Lilesville is a town in Anson County, North Carolina, United States. The population was 395 at the 2020 census.

== History ==
A post office called Lilesville has been in operation since 1827. The town was named for an early merchant.

== Geography ==
According to the United States Census Bureau, the town has a total area of 1.0 square mile (2.6 km^{2}), all land.

== Geology ==
Lilesville is home to the Lilesville Granite, a porphyritic igneous rock named for the town.

== Demographics ==
Historical population
Census	Pop.	Note	%±
1880	192		—
1890	222		15.6%
1900	213		−4.1%
1910	386		81.2%
1920	440		14.0%
1930	496		12.7%
1940	556		12.1%
1950	605		8.8%
1960	635		5.0%
1970	641		0.9%
1980	588		−8.3%
1990	468		−20.4%
2000	459		−1.9%
2010	536		16.8%
2020	395		−26.3%
2021 (est.)	404	▲	2.3%
U.S. Decennial Census

As of the census of 2000, there were 459 people, 186 households, and 129 families residing in the town. The population density was 460.1 inhabitants per square mile (177.6/km^{2}). There were 202 housing units at an average density of 202.5 per square mile (78.2/km^{2}). The racial makeup of the town was 52.07% White, 47.49% African American, 0.22% Native American, and 0.22% from two or more races. Hispanic or Latino of any race were 0.22% of the population.

There were 186 households, out of which 28.0% had children under the age of 18 living with them, 50.0% were married couples living together, 15.6% had a female householder with no husband present, and 30.6% were non-families. 29.0% of all households were made up of individuals, and 12.4% had someone living alone who was 65 years of age or older. The average household size was 2.47 and the average family size was 3.04.

In the town, the population was spread out, with 24.4% under the age of 18, 8.3% from 18 to 24, 25.1% from 25 to 44, 24.0% from 45 to 64, and 18.3% who were 65 years of age or older. The median age was 40 years. For every 100 females, there were 82.9 males. For every 100 females age 18 and over, there were 86.6 males.

The median income for a household in the town was $29,167, and the median income for a family was $40,000. Males had a median income of $30,179 versus $21,250 for females. The per capita income for the town was $14,099. About 11.9% of families and 13.0% of the population were below the poverty line, including 12.8% of those under age 18 and 30.4% of those age 65 or over.
