= Kelly Branch (Brown Creek tributary) =

Stream in North Carolina, USA

Kelly Branch Tributary to Brown Creek
- Location of Kelly Branch mouth

Location
- Country: United States
- State: North Carolina
- County: Anson

Physical characteristics
- Source: divide between Kelly Branch and Lanes Creek
  - location: about 0.25 miles south of Peachland, North Carolina
  - coordinates: 34°59′02″N 080°16′07″W
  - elevation: 425 ft (130 m)
- Mouth: Brown Creek
  - location: about 2 miles south of Peachland, North Carolina
  - coordinates: 34°57′26″N 080°14′59″W
  - elevation: 269 ft (82 m)
- Length: 2.73 mi (4.39 km)
- Basin size: 7.18 square miles (18.6 km^{2})
- Discharge
  - location: Brown Creek
  - average: 8.20 cu ft/s (0.232 m^{3}/s) at mouth with Brown Creek

Basin features
- Progression: south
- River system: Pee Dee River
- Tributaries
  - left: unnamed tributaries
  - right: Key Branch
- Bridges: Lower White Store Road

Kelly Branch is a tributary of Brown Creek in Anson County, North Carolina that rises just south of Peachland, North Carolina and then flows south to meet Brown Creek. The watershed is about 55% forested, 41% agricultural and the rest is of other land uses.

== See also ==
- List of North Carolina rivers
