= Charles B. Deane Jr. =

American lawyer and politician (1937–2022)

Charles Bennett Deane Jr. (February 21, 1937 – February 6, 2022) was an American lawyer and politician.

Deane was born in Rockingham, North Carolina, the son of Charles B. Deane who served in the United States House of Representatives. He graduated from Rockingham High School in 1955. Deane graduated from Wake Forest University in 1959 and received his law degree from Wake Forest University School of Law in 1962. Deane served in the United States Navy from 1962 to 1966 and was commissioned a lieutenant. Deane practiced law in Rockingham, North Carolina. He served on the Richmond County School Board for sixteen years. In 1970, Deane served in the North Carolina Senate and was a Democrat. He died at his home in Rockingham, North Carolina on February 6, 2022, at the age of 84.
