= White Store Township, Anson County, North Carolina =

Coordinates: 34.87409°N 80.24744°W

- Township
- Location of White Store Township in Anson County

- Location of Anson County in North Carolina
- Country: United States
- State: North Carolina
- County: Anson

Area
  - Total: 60.59 sq mi (156.94 km^{2})
- Highest elevation (high point at northeast end of township): 630 ft (190 m)
- Lowest elevation (Thompson Creek, where it flows out of the township in the southeast corner): 236 ft (72 m)

Population (2010)
  - Total: 506
  - Density: 8.35/sq mi (3.22/km^{2})
- Time zone: UTC-4 (EST)
  - Summer (DST): UTC-5 (EDT)

White Store Township, population 506, is one of eight townships in Anson County, North Carolina, United States. White Store Township is 60.59 square miles (156.9 km^{2}) in size and located in southwestern Anson County. White Store Township does not contain any municipalities.

== Geography ==
The northwestern end of White Store Township is drained by Brown Creek and its tributary, Black Jack Branch. The southeastern end is drained by Deadfall Creek and its tributaries, Shaw Creek, Bell Creek, and Boles Creek. The extreme southeastern corner is drained by Thompson Creek. Savannah Branch drains a small part of the southern part of the township.
