= South Piedmont Community College =

Community college in North Carolina, U.S.

Coordinates: 35.0312°N 80.6205°W

- Type: Public community college
- Established: 1963
- Parent institution: North Carolina Community College System
- President: Stacy Waters-Bailey
- Location: Polkton, Monroe, and Wadesboro, North Carolina, United States
- Nickname: Gators
- Mascot: Al The Gator
- Website: spcc.edu

South Piedmont Community College (South Piedmont or SPCC) is a public community college in North Carolina consisting of two campuses and two auxiliary centers in Anson and Union counties. It is part of the North Carolina Community College System.

== History ==
SPCC was created in 1999 by the North Carolina General Assembly. When SPCC was created, the school replaced Anson Community College and Union Technical Education Center; through these predecessors the college can trace its roots back to 1962.

- In 1962, the Ansonville unit of the Charlotte Industrial Education Center was founded in order to assure quality education was available to local Anson County, North Carolina residents. Working with Stanly Community College, South Piedmont Community College provided years of service in Union County under the name of Union Technical Education Center.
- In 1967, a local Board of Trustees changed the Ansonville Industrial Education Center to the Anson Technical Institute, a unit of the Department of Community Colleges of North Carolina.
- In 1971, the legislature authorized the chartering of Anson Technical Institute.
- From the early 1970s through 1981, Anson Tech, Central Piedmont, and Stanly Community College offered credit and non-credit courses in Union County.
- In 1977, due to increased enrollment (including from Polkton Mayor W. Cliff Martin) Anson Technical Institute acquired land, obtained additional funds, and completed the construction of a 28,000-square-foot (2,600 m^{2}) building in Polkton.
- On June 7, 1979, Anson Technical Institute became Anson Technical College.
- In 1981, the Union Technical Education Consortium was created when Central Piedmont voluntarily withdrew from Union County and the N.C. Department of Community Colleges authorized service in the county by a consortium of Anson and Stanly community colleges.
- In 1982, construction was completed in Polkton on a second building, the Martin Learning Resources Center, named in honor of trustee and benefactor W. Cliff Martin.
- In 1986, Union County Commissioners appointed a 12-member committee to study the need for technical education in Union County.
- On Nov. 1, 1987, Anson Technical College was renamed Anson Community College.
- On May 19, 1999, Gov. Jim Hunt signed a bill abolishing Anson Community College and Union Technical Education Center and creating North Carolina's newest community college: South Piedmont Community College.
- On August 3, 1999, South Piedmont Community College was named as the result of a naming contest.

== Campuses ==
- L.L. Polk Campus in Polkton, North Carolina
- Lockhart-Taylor Center in Wadesboro, North Carolina
- Old Charlotte Highway Campus in Monroe, North Carolina
- Tyson Family Center for Technology in Monroe, North Carolina
