= Gulledge Township, Anson County, North Carolina =

Coordinates: 34.86791°N 80.10999°W

- Township
- Location of Gulledge Township in Anson County

- Location of Anson County in North Carolina
- Country: United States
- State: North Carolina
- County: Anson

Area
  - Total: 67.50 sq mi (174.83 km^{2})
- Highest elevation (high point at northern part of township): 630 ft (190 m)
- Lowest elevation (Deadfall Creek where it flows out of the township in the south end): 230 ft (70 m)

Population (2010)
  - Total: 2,238
  - Density: 33.16/sq mi (12.80/km^{2})
- Time zone: UTC-4 (EST)
  - Summer (DST): UTC-5 (EDT)
- Area code: 704

Gulledge Township, population 2,238, is one of eight townships in Anson County, North Carolina. Gulledge Township is 67.50 square miles (174.8 km^{2}) in size and is located in southern Anson County. This township does not have any cities or towns within it.

== Geography ==
Gulledge Township is drained by North Fork of Jones Creek and its tributary, Lampley Branch in the northeast. The central part of the township is drained by South Fork Jones Creek. The southern part of the township is drained by Thompson Creek and its tributaries, Rhoddy Creek and Deadfall Creek.
