= Lick Creek (Brown Creek tributary) =

Stream in North Carolina, USA

Lick Creek Tributary to Brown Creek
- Location of Lick Creek mouth

Location
- Country: United States
- State: North Carolina
- County: Anson

Physical characteristics
- Source: divide between Lick Creek and Shaw Creek
  - location: about 0.5 miles southwest of Gordon Mountain
  - coordinates: 34°54′15″N 080°12′41″W
  - elevation: 410 ft (120 m)
- Mouth: Brown Creek
  - location: about 1 north of Mineral Springs, North Carolina
  - coordinates: 34°57′40″N 080°14′43″W
  - elevation: 269 ft (82 m)
- Length: 5.15 mi (8.29 km)
- Basin size: 7.25 square miles (18.8 km^{2})
- Discharge
  - location: Brown Creek
  - average: 8.25 cu ft/s (0.234 m^{3}/s) at mouth with Brown Creek

Basin features
- Progression: south
- River system: Pee Dee River
- Tributaries
  - left: unnamed tributaries
  - right: unnamed tributaries
- Bridges: White Store Road; Lowery Road

Lick Creek is a tributary of Brown Creek in Anson County, North Carolina that rises southwest of Gordon Mountain and then flows north to meet Brown Creek near Mineral Springs, North Carolina. The watershed is about 67% forested, 30% agricultural and the rest is of other land uses.

== See also ==
- List of North Carolina rivers
