= Charles B. Deane =

American politician

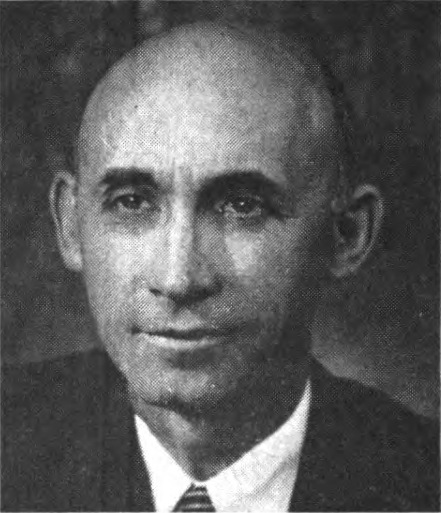

Member of the U.S. House of Representatives from North Carolina's 8th district
- In office January 3, 1947 – January 3, 1957
- Preceded by: Eliza Pratt
- Succeeded by: A. Paul Kitchin

Personal details
- Born: November 1, 1898 Ansonville Township, Anson County, North Carolina, U.S.
- Died: November 24, 1969 (aged 71) Rockingham, North Carolina, U.S.
- Party: Democratic
- Children: Charles B. Deane Jr. (son)

Charles Bennett Deane (November 1, 1898 – November 24, 1969) was a member of the United States House of Representatives from North Carolina.

== Career ==
Deane was born in Ansonville Township, Anson County, North Carolina on 1 November 1898. He attended Pee Dee Academy in Rockingham, North Carolina, and Trinity Park School, Durham, N.C., 1918-1920. Next Deane studied at and then graduated from the law department of Wake Forest College in 1923. He was admitted to the bar the same year and commenced practice in Rockingham. He was an active Southern Baptist.

He was register of deeds of Richmond County, North Carolina from 1926–1934; attorney in the Wage and Hour Division, Department of Labor, Washington, D.C., in 1938 and 1939; in 1940, engaged in administrative law and in the general insurance business; served as chairman of the Richmond County Democratic executive committee 1932-1946; trustee of Wake Forest College.

Deane campaigned for the Democratic nomination for the U.S. House in 1938 and 1940. In the first primary for a vacant seat the State Board of Elections found he had won a runoff by 23 votes, but court challenges tied up a decision until the governor appointed a panel, with the agreement of both contenders, to award the nomination, and Deane lost. The evidence of fraud in the contest led the General assembly to outlaw absentee ballots in primaries. His 1940 race was largely a grudge match against the man who had taken the seat.

The House seat was vacated again in 1946 through the death of the man who had defeated Deane and then filled by appointment of the incumbent's secretary, who did not contest the regular election. Dean was elected as a Democrat to the Eightieth and to the four succeeding Congresses (January 3, 1947 – January 3, 1957). He was named to the Appropriations Committee in the 84th Congress.

Closely associated with the Moral Rearmament movement, he was defeated in the 1956 Democratic primary for a sixth term because he had refused to sign the controversial Southern Manifesto against desegregation of the races. Deane was quoted as saying "I do not have to remain in Washington but I do have to live with myself. I shall not sign my name to any document which will make any man anywhere a second-class citizen," to his pastor in regard to the Manifesto.

Following his failure to be renominated Deane spent the last 13 years of his life as an attorney in Rockingham, North Carolina. Long active in Baptist affairs, he was chosen president of the Baptist State Convention of North Carolina for two back-to-back one-year terms in 1959 and 1960.

Deane died in Rockingham, North Carolina, November 24, 1969, and was interred in Eastside Cemetery. His son was Charles B. Deane Jr. who served in the North Carolina General Assembly.

U.S. House of Representatives
Preceded by Eliza Pratt	Member of the U.S. House of Representatives from North Carolina's 8th congressional district 1947–1957	Succeeded by A. Paul Kitchin
