= Wadesboro, Louisiana =

Unincorporated community in Louisiana

- Unincorporated community
- Location within Louisiana Location within the United States
- Coordinates: 30°25′24″N 90°30′16″W
- Country: United States
- State: Louisiana
- Parish: Tangipahoa
- Elevation: 13 ft (4.0 m)
- Time zone: UTC-6 (Central (CST))
  - Summer (DST): UTC-5 (CDT)
- Area code: 985
- GNIS feature ID: 543764
- FIPS code: 22-79065

Wadesboro is an unincorporated community in Tangipahoa Parish, Louisiana, United States. The community is located 2 miles (3.22 kilometres) southwest of Ponchatoula, Louisiana.

== History ==
In 1812 Richard Wade, born in 1790 and his wife Mary Ann Skaggs, born in 1787, settled in the area and purchased 960 acres of land from the United States Federal Government located near the Natalbany River and Ponchatoula Creek. He was a cotton farmer and engaged in riverboat trade utilizing his river landings to export goods. In 1821 he purchased a schooner and named it the Admiral. Local court documents reveal that in 1826 Wade owned and operated a tavern in the area. Later in life he began planning the establishment of a town and named it Wadesborough.
