= Lilesville Granite =

Body of granitic rock

The Lilesville Granite
- Stratigraphic range: Pennsylvanian-Permian
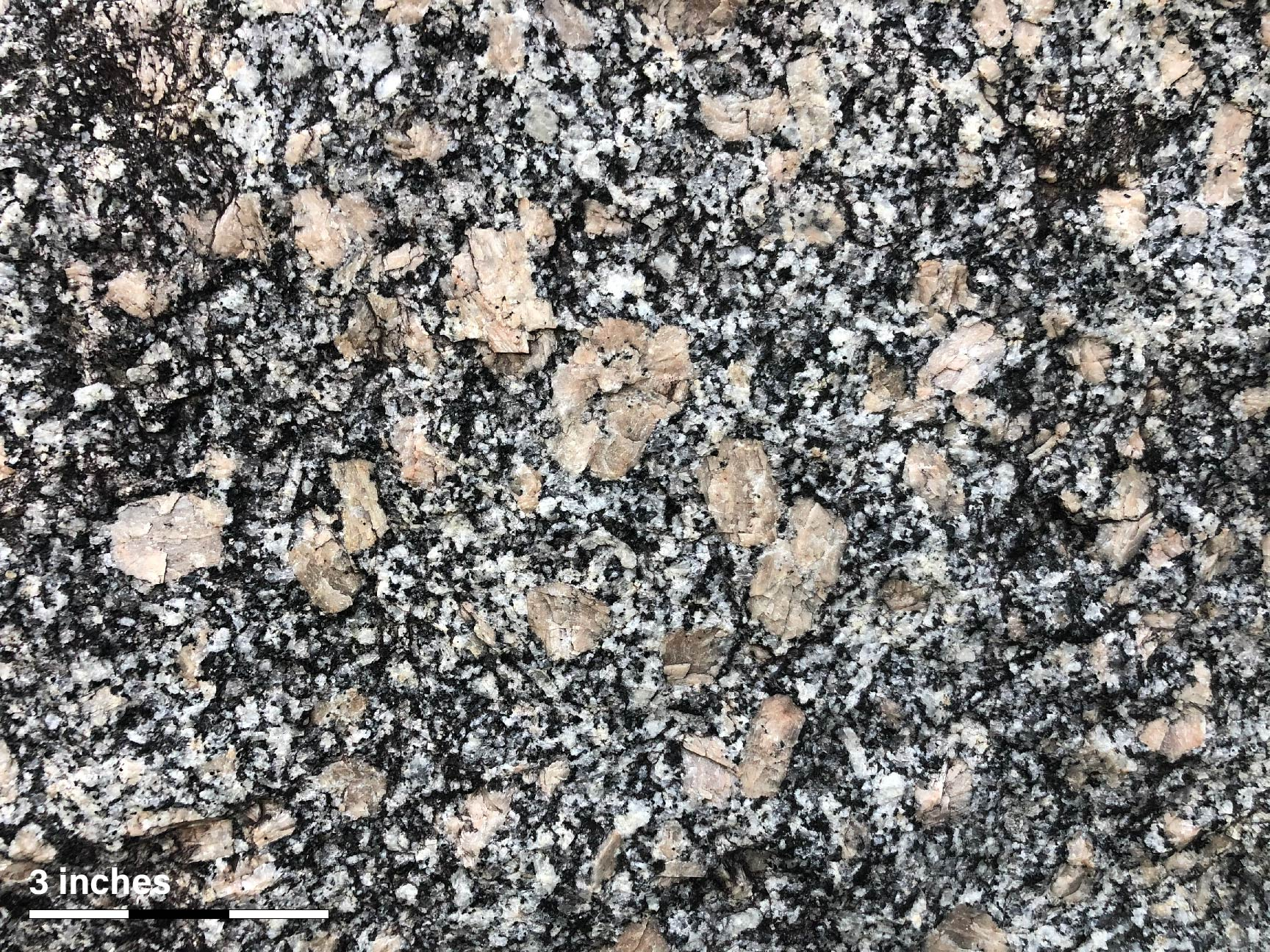
- The Lilesville Granite in the rock garden at Appalachian State University
- Area: 94 square miles

Lithology
- Primary: Granite

Location
- Region: Piedmont of North Carolina
- Country: United States

Type section
- Named for: Lilesville, North Carolina

The Lilesville Granite, also referred to as the Lilesville pluton, is a ring-shaped body of granitic rock that spans about 94 square miles (240 km^{2}) in Anson, Richmond, and Montgomery Counties in southern North Carolina.

== Composition ==
The Lilesville Granite is composed of megacrysts up to 4 cm of pink potassium-rich feldspar surrounded by gray plagioclase feldspar, clear quartz, and biotite. Small amounts of muscovite and magnetite are also present. The texture of the rock ranges from medium-grained (~4-5 mm) to large, coarse grains (~4 cm).

== History ==
The pluton has been determined by Rb/Sr isotope dating to be 326 +/- 27 million years old, indicating emplacement during the Pennsylvanian-Permian. A contact aureole composed mainly of mica schist and mica gneiss surrounds the body of granite, and the granite is intruded by the Pee Dee gabbro, which grades outward into diorite.

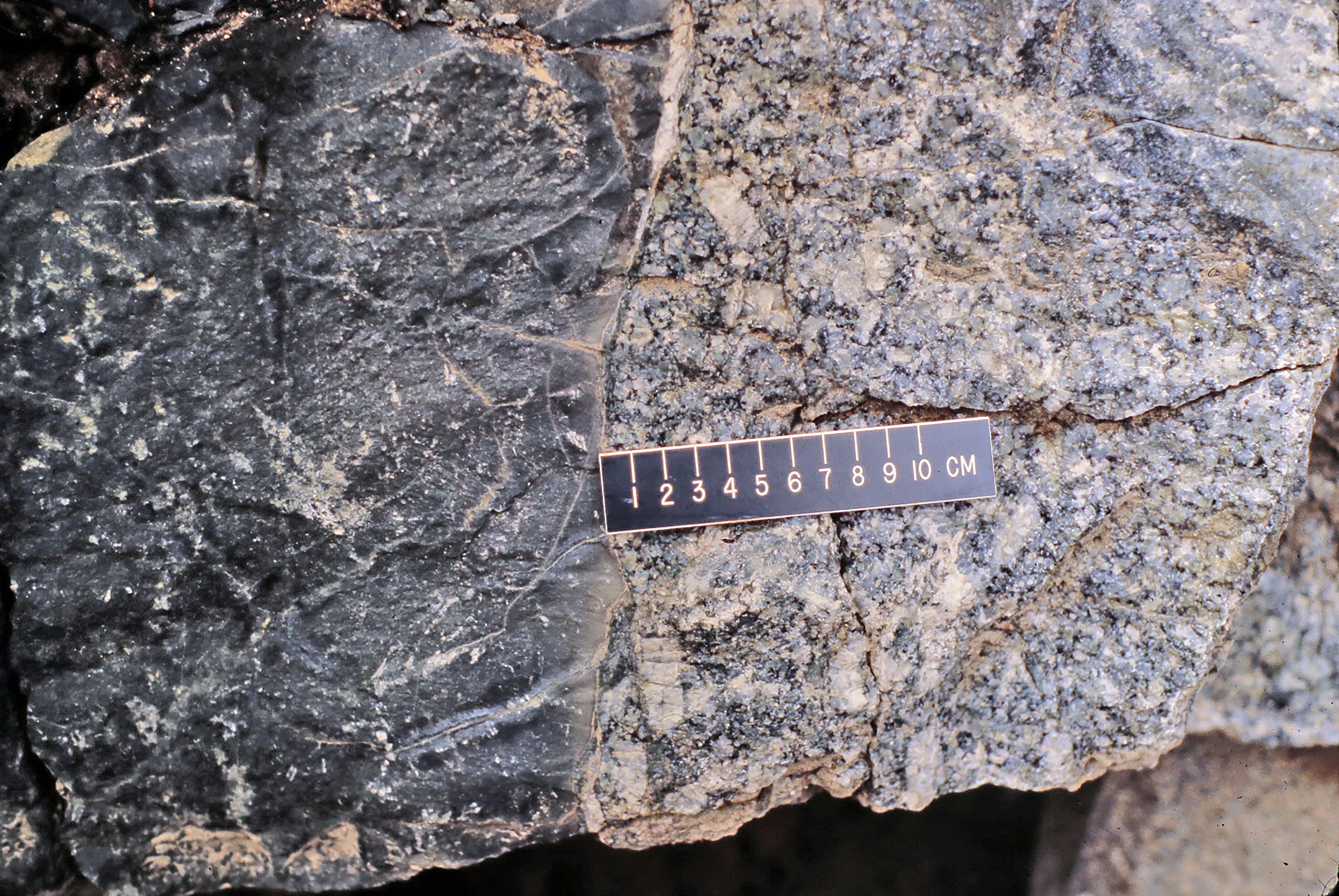
The Lilesville Granite (right) next to a mafic dike (left) taken at Vulcan Materials Quarry. Contact is shown between the two units.

During the late Precambrian-early Cambrian, there was an accumulation of felsic volcanic rocks and argillite, a fine grained sedimentary rock. Regional metamorphism took place during the Paleozoic, along with compression of the area which resulted in an anticline. The original rocks were then intruded by the Lilesville Granite, which crystallized in place as the country rock was metamorphosed by the heat of the magma intrusion. This resulted in the formation of the contact aureole. Mica gneiss xenoliths of various sizes can be found throughout the granite, especially near the contact with the aureole. The Lilesville Granite was then intruded by the Pee Dee Gabbro, which can be confirmed by the presence of granite xenoliths in the gabbro. During the Triassic, a system of normal faults including the Jonesboro fault cut through the area and a period of sedimentation followed and deposition of clastic rocks such as conglomerates, sandstones, and siltstones occurred. Then several dolerite dikes, thought to be late Triassic or Jurassic in age, intruded into the Lilesville Granite. The Lilesville Granite has been heavily weathered and is often covered by sediment where it outcrops.

== Petrology ==
=== Lilesville Granite ===
The Lilesville Granite consists of quartz monzonite, tonalite, and granodiorite. The thickness of the pluton is inconsistent; coarse-grained quartz monzonite is found in the thicker sections, while granodiorite tends to dominate the thinner sections. Potassium feldspar is also noticeably more prevalent as the pluton gets thicker, suggesting that the pluton is zoned compositionally. Overall, the granite is a porphyritic rock that is composed of plagioclase feldspar, quartz, and biotite, and contains large pink microcline chunks throughout the matrix. The microcline megacrysts appear as blocky, subhedral grains that are generally around 2 cm in length, but can range from 1 to 4 cm. These megacrysts are often perthitic in texture and their fractures commonly contain quartz, plagioclase, and biotite. The quartz throughout the granite shows up as grey anhedral grains, generally smaller than 5 mm in length. Flakes of biotite can be found throughout the matrix and are usually around 4 mm or smaller. Small amounts of other minerals such as muscovite, magnetite, and chlorite are also present.

=== Contact aureole ===
The country rock surrounding the Lilesville Granite underwent thermal metamorphism when the magma intruded, forming a contact aureole. This aureole can be divided into different zones based on mineralogy and location relative to the pluton.

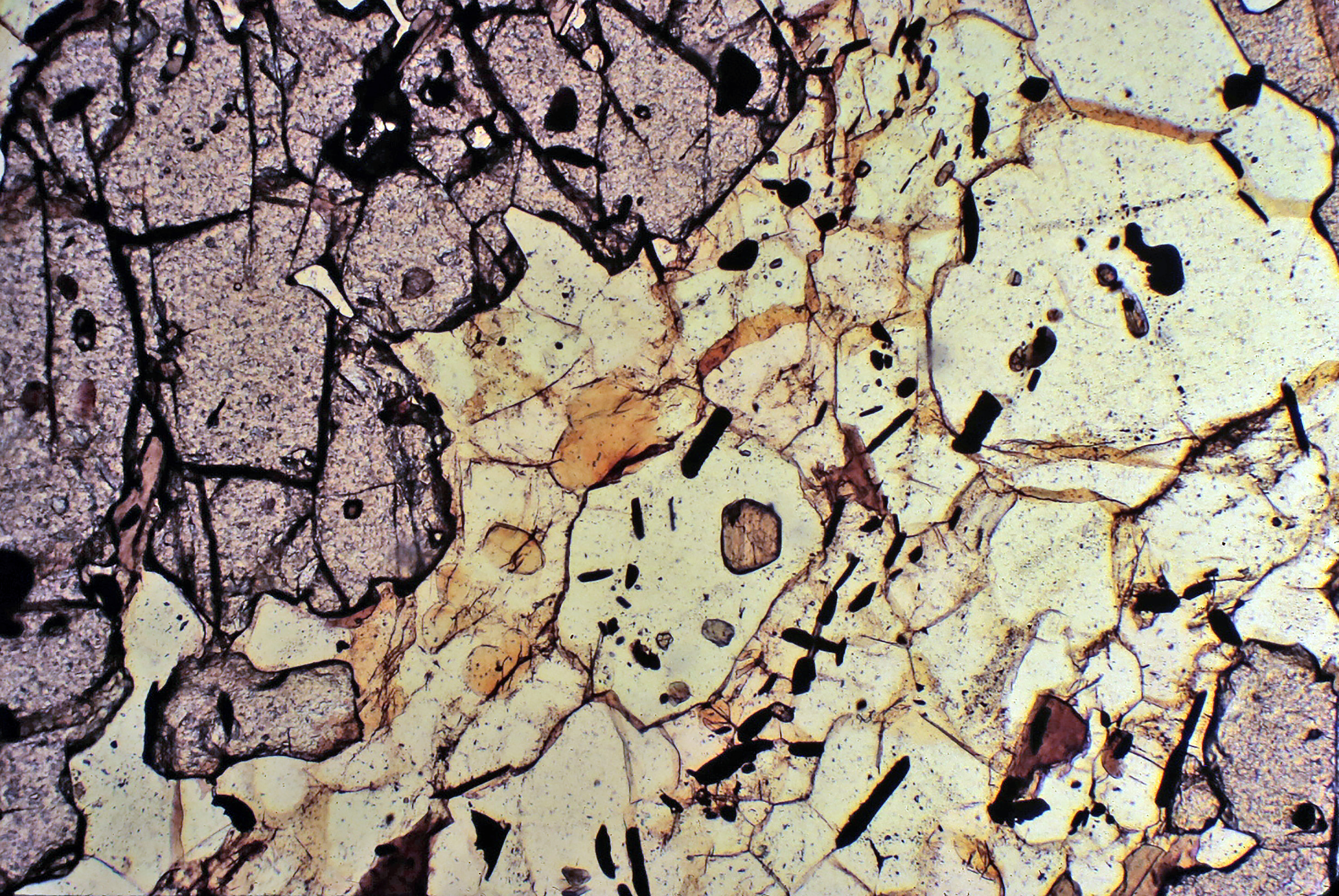
Thin section of interior hornfels of contact aureole showing garnet, cordierite, orthopyroxene in plane polarized light. Presence of orthopyroxene indicates high-grade contact metamorphism.

==== Exterior aureole ====
The exterior aureole is a hornfels that surrounds the Lilesville pluton. The outer part of this hornfels consists of a gray fine-grained matrix of muscovite, plagioclase feldspar, and quartz; chlorite can also be found in areas of lower metamorphic grade. Throughout the matrix, porphyroblasts of biotite and cordierite can be found. The biotites in the exterior aureole become more iron- and titanium-rich as they near contact with the Lilesville Granite.

In the inner part of the exterior aureole, potassium-rich feldspar begins to appear as it gets closer to the granite. This part of the exterior aureole is a darker gray matrix composed of quartz, feldspar, and biotite. Porphyroblasts of cordierite are still found here, but instead of biotite, garnet and andalusite porphyroblasts appear instead. Other iron-rich minerals such as ilmenite, magnetite, and chalcopyrite are also present.

==== Interior aureole ====
The interior aureole consists of hornfelses that are found in the center of the ring-shaped Lilesville pluton. These hornfelses consist of biotite, cordierite, potassium and plagioclase feldspars, and quartz. Accessory minerals include zircon, tourmaline, apatite, and others. Orthopyroxene is also present in small amounts near the Pee Dee gabbro, indicating a higher grade of metamorphism near the contact. It is likely that this is due to some thermal metamorphism when the Pee Dee gabbro intruded.

The very center of the interior contact aureole consists of migmatite, which is often observed as a mica-rich gneiss.

== Uses ==
The Lilesville Granite is one of the many rocks used by Vulcan Materials to produce construction aggregates. The Lilesville Granite can be crushed into gravel or sand and used as a base layer for roads, walkways, parking lots, and more. It can also be used as a material in construction, such as for building houses or schools.
