= Brown Creek (Pee Dee River tributary) =

Stream in North Carolina, USA

Brown Creek Tributary to Pee Dee River
- Location of Brown Creek mouth

Location
- Country: United States
- State: North Carolina; South Carolina
- Counties: Anson (NC); Union (NC); Chesterfield (SC)

Physical characteristics
- Source: divide between Lynches River (Hills Creek) and Brown Creek
  - location: about 1 mile north of Pageland, South Carolina
  - coordinates: 34°47′51″N 080°23′50″W
  - elevation: 540 ft (160 m)
- Mouth: Pee Dee River
  - location: about 2 miles southeast of Ansonville, North Carolina
  - coordinates: 35°05′22″N 080°00′56″W
  - elevation: 180 ft (55 m)
- Length: 46.47 mi (74.79 km)
- Basin size: 180.95 square miles (468.7 km^{2})
- Discharge
  - location: Pee Dee River
  - average: 180.92 cu ft/s (5.123 m^{3}/s) at mouth with Pee Dee River

Basin features
- Progression: northeast
- River system: Pee Dee River
- Tributaries
  - left: Little Brown Creek; Black Jack Creek; Kelly Branch; Swans Branch; Ledbettter Branch; Haileys Branch; Cranes Branch; Cabin Branch; Jacks Branch; Cabbage Branch; Permetter Branch
  - right: Rushing Branch; Lick Creek; Little Brown Creek; Pinch Gut Creek; Goulds Fork; Hurricane Creek; Flat Fork
- Bridges: Brock Road, Outen Road, Canal Road, Smith Town Road, Okey High Road, Meltonville Church Road, Lower White Store Road, Mineral Springs Church Road, Poplar Hill Church Road, US 74, Cameron Road, NC 742, US 52, Pinkston River Road, Grassy Island Road

Brown Creek is a tributary of the Pee Dee River in south-central North Carolina and north-central South Carolina that drains Chesterfield County, South Carolina, Union County, North Carolina, and Anson County, North Carolina.

Brown Creek rises near the town of the Pageland, South Carolina and flows northeast briefly into Union County and then through Anson County. The creek drains a large portion of the Wadesboro Triassic Basin.

== Variant names ==
According to the Geographic Names Information System, it has also been known historically as:

- Big Brown Creek
- Browns Creek

== See also ==
- List of North Carolina rivers
