= Goulds Fork (Brown Creek tributary) =

Stream in North Carolina, USA

Goulds Fork Tributary to Brown Creek
- Location of Goulds Fork mouth Goulds Fork (Brown Creek tributary) (the United States)

Location
- Country: United States
- State: North Carolina
- County: Anson

Physical characteristics
- Source: divide between Goulds Fork and North Fork Jones Creek
  - location: pond about 3 miles southwest of Wadesboro, North Carolina
  - coordinates: 34°55′21″N 080°08′05″W
  - elevation: 510 ft (160 m)
- Mouth: Brown Creek
  - location: about 2.5 miles south of Ansonville, North Carolina
  - coordinates: 35°03′41″N 080°06′10″W
  - elevation: 207 ft (63 m)
- Length: 12.01 mi (19.33 km)
- Basin size: 25.32 square miles (65.6 km^{2})
- Discharge
  - location: Brown Creek
  - average: 27.13 cu ft/s (0.768 m^{3}/s) at mouth with Brown Creek

Basin features
- Progression: north
- River system: Pee Dee River
- Tributaries
  - left: unnamed tributaries
  - right: Culpepper Creek; Grindstone Branch
- Bridges: White Store Road, Avery Road, US 74, NC 742, Brown Creek Church Road, Lockhart Road

Goulds Fork is a 12.10-mile-long (19.47 km) third-order tributary to Brown Creek in Anson County, North Carolina.

== Variant names ==
According to the Geographic Names Information System, it has also been known historically as:

- Little Browns Creek

== Course ==
Goulds Fork rises about 3 miles southwest of Wadesboro, North Carolina. Goulds Fork then flows north to meet Brown Creek about 2.5 miles south of Ansonville, North Carolina.

== Watershed ==
Goulds Fork drains 25.32 square miles (65.6 km^{2}) of area, receives about 47.9 in/year of precipitation, has a topographic wetness index of 435.21 and is about 64% forested.
