= Polkton, North Carolina =

- Town
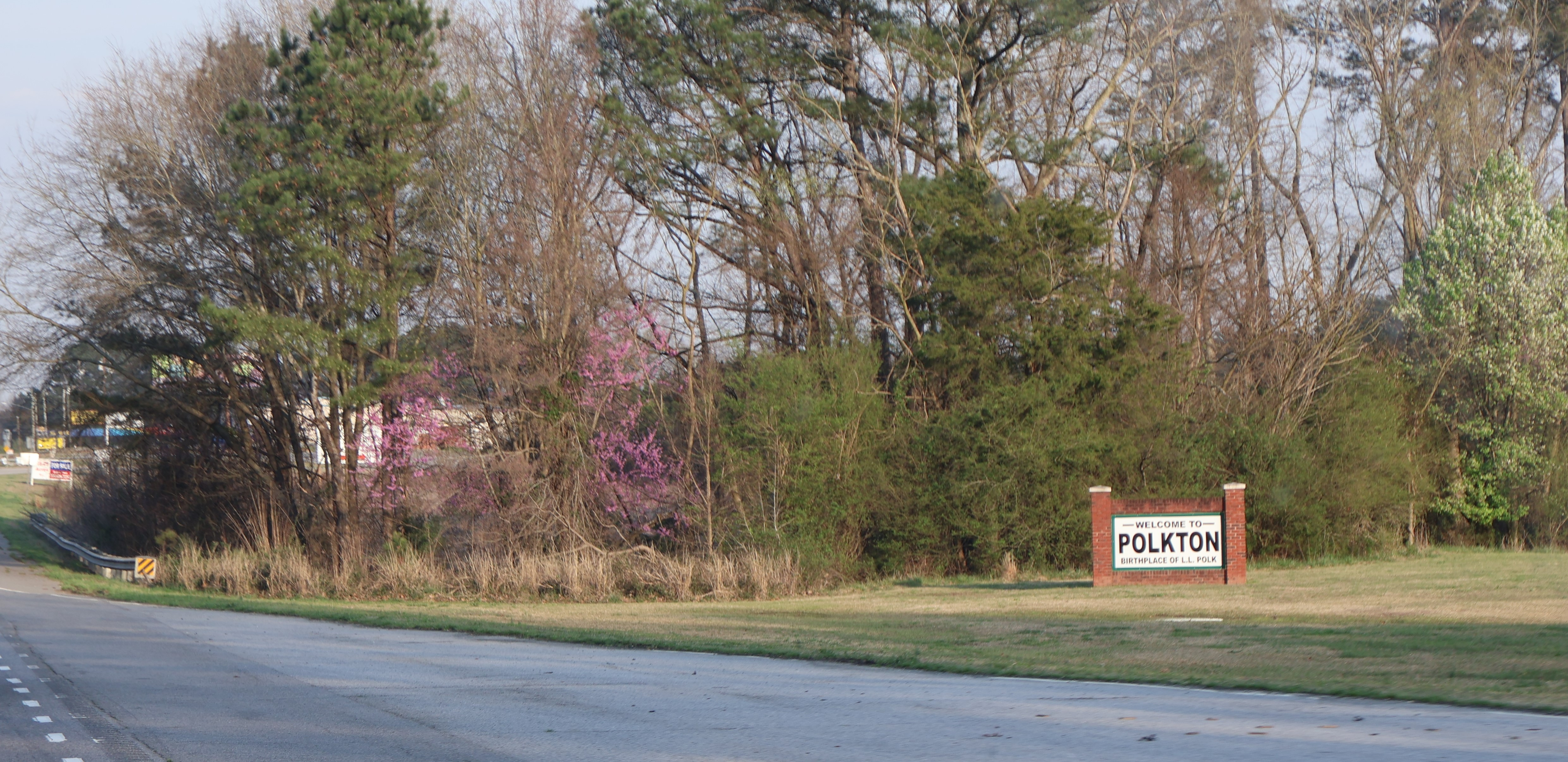
- Polkton welcome sign on US 74

- Seal
- Motto: "Birthplace of L.L. Polk"
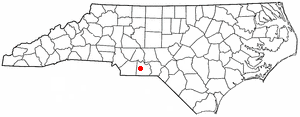
- Location of Polkton, North Carolina
- Coordinates: 35°00′11″N 80°11′47″W
- Country: United States
- State: North Carolina
- County: Anson
- Incorporated: 1875
- Named for: Leonidas L. Polk

Area
  - Total: 3.05 sq mi (7.91 km^{2})
  - Land: 3.05 sq mi (7.91 km^{2})
  - Water: 0 sq mi (0.00 km^{2})
- Elevation: 272 ft (83 m)

Population (2020)
  - Total: 2,250
  - Density: 736.8/sq mi (284.49/km^{2})
- Time zone: UTC-5 (Eastern (EST))
  - Summer (DST): UTC-4 (EDT)
- ZIP code: 28135
- Area code: 704
- FIPS code: 37-53140
- GNIS feature ID: 2407140
- Website: www.townofpolkton.org

Polkton is a town in Anson County, North Carolina, United States. As of the 2020 census, the town population was 2,250, down from 3,375 in 2010.

The town is named after its founder, Leonidas L. Polk.

== History ==
Polkton was founded by Leonidas Lafayette Polk, and incorporated in 1875. The Billy Horne Farm was listed on the National Register of Historic Places in 1989.

== Geography ==
According to the United States Census Bureau, the town has a total area of 3.2 square miles (8.2 km^{2}), all land.

== Demographics ==
Historical population
Census	Pop.	Note	%±
1880	183		—
1890	247		35.0%
1900	276		11.7%
1910	287		4.0%
1920	575		100.3%
1930	534		−7.1%
1940	521		−2.4%
1950	459		−11.9%
1960	530		15.5%
1970	845		59.4%
1980	762		−9.8%
1990	662		−13.1%
2000	1,195		80.5%
2010	3,375		182.4%
2020	2,250		−33.3%
2021 (est.)	1,876	▼	−16.6%
U.S. Decennial Census

=== Racial and ethnic composition ===
Polkton town, North Carolina – Racial and ethnic composition Note: the US Census treats Hispanic/Latino as an ethnic category. This table excludes Latinos from the racial categories and assigns them to a separate category. Hispanics/Latinos may be of any race.
Race / Ethnicity (NH = Non-Hispanic)	Pop 2000	Pop 2010	Pop 2020	% 2000	% 2010	% 2020
White alone (NH)	471	935	1,008	39.41%	27.70%	44.80%
Black or African American alone (NH)	673	2,051	1,067	56.32%	60.77%	47.42%
Native American or Alaska Native alone (NH)	15	54	15	1.26%	1.60%	0.67%
Asian alone (NH)	16	20	6	1.34%	0.59%	0.27%
Native Hawaiian or Pacific Islander alone (NH)	0	1	0	0.00%	0.03%	0.00%
Other race alone (NH)	1	9	0	0.08%	0.27%	0.00%
Mixed race or Multiracial (NH)	5	27	59	0.42%	0.80%	2.62%
Hispanic or Latino (any race)	14	278	95	1.17%	8.24%	4.22%
Total	1,195	3,375	2,250	100.00%	100.00%	100.00%

=== 2020 census ===
As of the 2020 census, Polkton had a population of 2,250. The median age was 40.0 years. 9.8% of residents were under the age of 18 and 9.5% of residents were 65 years of age or older. For every 100 females there were 97.9 males, and for every 100 females age 18 and over there were 97.3 males age 18 and over.

0.0% of residents lived in urban areas, while 100.0% lived in rural areas.

There were 354 households in Polkton, of which 33.3% had children under the age of 18 living in them. Of all households, 28.5% were married-couple households, 24.6% were households with a male householder and no spouse or partner present, and 37.6% were households with a female householder and no spouse or partner present. About 31.6% of all households were made up of individuals and 14.4% had someone living alone who was 65 years of age or older.

There were 390 housing units, of which 9.2% were vacant. The homeowner vacancy rate was 2.4% and the rental vacancy rate was 4.5%.

=== 2000 census ===
As of the census of 2000, there were 1,195 people, 297 households, and 206 families residing in the town. The population density was 438.5 inhabitants per square mile (169.3/km^{2}). There were 336 housing units at an average density of 123.3 per square mile (47.6/km^{2}). The racial makeup of the town was 56.32% African American, 40.08% White, 1.34% Asian, 1.26% Native American, 0% Pacific Islander, 0.59% from other races, and 0.42% from two or more races. Hispanic or Latino of any race were 1.17% of the population.

There were 297 households, out of which 28.6% had children under the age of 18 living with them, 42.4% were married couples living together, 20.9% had a female householder with no husband present, and 30.6% were non-families. 27.6% of all households were made up of individuals, and 9.1% had someone living alone who was 65 years of age or older. The average household size was 2.66 and the average family size was 3.25.

In the town, the population was spread out, with 18.7% under the age of 18, 10.4% from 18 to 24, 42.5% from 25 to 44, 19.9% from 45 to 64, and 8.5% who were 65 years of age or older. The median age was 34 years. For every 100 females, there were 185.2 males. For every 100 females age 18 and over, there were 217.3 males.

The median income for a household in the town was $30,329, and the median income for a family was $35,313. Males had a median income of $23,125 versus $20,682 for females. The per capita income for the town was $13,783. About 16.3% of families and 22.5% of the population were below the poverty line, including 31.5% of those under age 18 and 22.9% of those age 65 or over.

== Education ==
The main campus of South Piedmont Community College is on US Highway 74 at the edge of Polkton. SPCC serves Anson and Union counties.
