= Ansonville, North Carolina =

- Town
- Logo

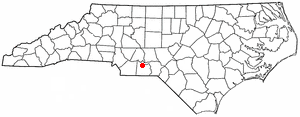
- Location of Ansonville, North Carolina
- Coordinates: 35°06′15″N 80°06′35″W
- Country: United States
- State: North Carolina
- County: Anson
- Founded: 1844
- Incorporated: 1885
- Named for: Anson County

Government
  - Mayor: Angela Caraway

Area
  - Total: 1.47 sq mi (3.81 km^{2})
  - Land: 1.47 sq mi (3.81 km^{2})
  - Water: 0 sq mi (0.00 km^{2})
- Elevation: 328 ft (100 m)

Population (2020)
  - Total: 440
  - Density: 299.0/sq mi (115.45/km^{2})
- Time zone: UTC-5 (Eastern (EST))
  - Summer (DST): UTC-4 (EDT)
- ZIP code: 28007
- Area code: 704
- FIPS code: 37-01420
- GNIS feature ID: 2405154
- Website: Town of Ansonville

Ansonville is a town in Anson County, North Carolina, United States. The population was 440 at the 2020 census. The town has an area of 1.5 square miles (3.8 km^{2}), all land. It is on the northern edge of Anson County, about a mile west of the Pee Dee River.

== History ==
The town was settled in 1844. In 1850, the North Carolina Legislature created the Carolina Female College in Ansonville. The facility was run by and for the daughters of local planters, and served only white women. Sources differ on when the facility closed, but all agree the Civil War was the reason for its closure, in either 1862 or 1867.

== Demographics ==
Historical population
Census	Pop.	Note	%±
1930	532		—
1940	519		−2.4%
1950	545		5.0%
1960	558		2.4%
1970	694		24.4%
1980	794		14.4%
1990	614		−22.7%
2000	636		3.6%
2010	631		−0.8%
2020	440		−30.3%
2021 (est.)	424	▼	−3.6%
U.S. Decennial Census

=== Racial and ethnic composition ===
Ansonville town, North Carolina – Racial and ethnic composition Note: the US Census treats Hispanic/Latino as an ethnic category. This table excludes Latinos from the racial categories and assigns them to a separate category. Hispanics/Latinos may be of any race.
Race / Ethnicity (NH = Non-Hispanic)	Pop 2000	Pop 2010	Pop 2020	% 2000	% 2010	% 2020
White alone (NH)	143	170	99	22.48%	26.94%	22.50%
Black or African American alone (NH)	484	437	318	76.10%	69.26%	72.27%
Native American or Alaska Native alone (NH)	0	0	2	0.00%	0.00%	0.45%
Asian alone (NH)	3	5	1	0.47%	0.79%	0.23%
Native Hawaiian or Pacific Islander alone (NH)	0	0	0	0.00%	0.00%	0.00%
Other race alone (NH)	0	1	1	0.00%	0.16%	0.23%
Mixed race or Multiracial (NH)	4	2	6	0.63%	0.32%	1.36%
Hispanic or Latino (any race)	2	16	13	0.31%	2.54%	2.95%
Total	636	631	440	100.00%	100.00%	100.00%

=== 2000 census ===
As of the census of 2000, there were 636 people, 242 households, and 172 families residing in the town. The population density was 435.2 inhabitants per square mile (168.0/km^{2}). There were 262 housing units at an average density of 179.3 per square mile (69.2/km^{2}). The racial makeup of the town was 22.48% White, 76.42% African American, 0.47% Asian, and 0.63% from two or more races. Hispanic or Latino of any race were 0.31% of the population.

There were 242 households, out of which 28.1% had children under the age of 18 living with them, 44.2% were married couples living together, 22.7% had a female householder with no husband present, and 28.9% were non-families. 28.5% of all households were made up of individuals, and 11.6% had someone living alone who was 65 years of age or older. The average household size was 2.63 and the average family size was 3.24.

In the town, the population was spread out, with 24.2% under the age of 18, 8.8% from 18 to 24, 26.7% from 25 to 44, 24.2% from 45 to 64, and 16.0% who were 65 years of age or older. The median age was 40 years. For every 100 females, there were 85.4 males. For every 100 females age 18 and over, there were 81.9 males.

The median income for a household in the town was $26,576, and the median income for a family was $30,982. Males had a median income of $24,231 versus $17,708 for females. The per capita income for the town was $12,754. About 9.7% of families and 10.7% of the population were below the poverty line, including 11.9% of those under age 18 and 7.9% of those age 65 or over.
