= Anson County, North Carolina =

County in North Carolina, United States

- County
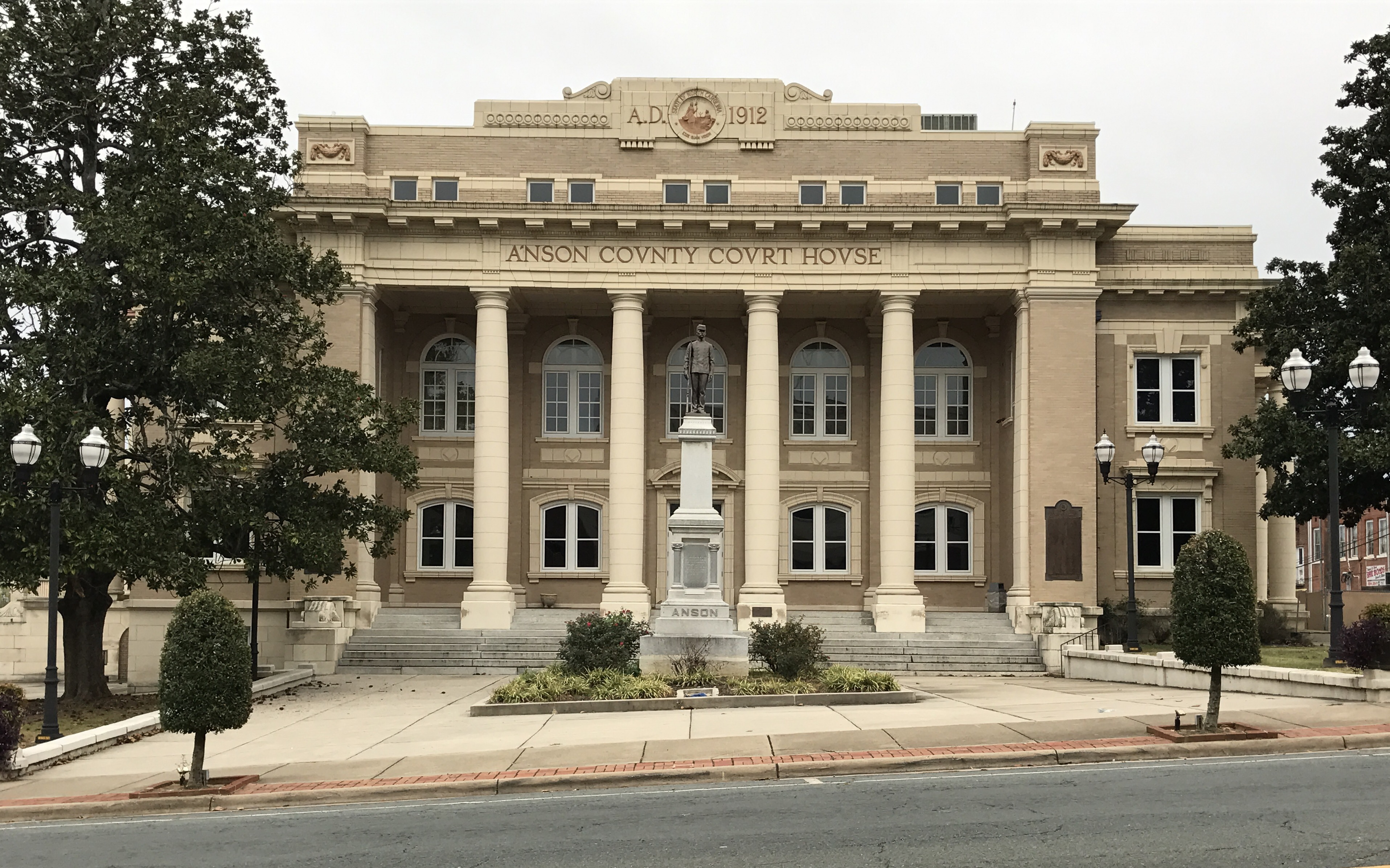
- Anson County Courthouse and Confederate Monument in Wadesboro

- Flag Seal
- Motto: "Anson County - A great place to call home"
- Location within the U.S. state of North Carolina
- Interactive map of Anson County, North Carolina
- Coordinates: 34.98°N 80.11°W
- Country: United States
- State: North Carolina
- Founded: 1750
- Named for: George Anson, Baron Anson
- Seat: Wadesboro
- Largest community: Wadesboro

Area
  - Total: 537.10 sq mi (1,391.1 km^{2})
  - Land: 531.46 sq mi (1,376.5 km^{2})
  - Water: 5.64 sq mi (14.6 km^{2}) 1.05%

Population (2020)
  - Total: 22,055
  - Estimate (2025): 21,758 ▼
  - Density: 41.5/sq mi (16.0/km^{2})
- Time zone: UTC−5 (Eastern)
  - Summer (DST): UTC−4 (EDT)
- Congressional district: 8th
- Website: www.co.anson.nc.us

Anson County is a county in the U.S. state of North Carolina. As of the 2020 census, the population was 22,055. Its county seat is Wadesboro.

== History ==
The area eventually comprising Anson County was originally occupied by Native Americans of the Catawba and Waxhaw tribes.

The county was formed in 1750 from Bladen County. It was named for the Royal Navy officer and politician George Anson, 1st Baron Anson, who purchased land in North Carolina. The county seat was designated at New Town in 1783. Four years later it was renamed Wadesboro.

Reductions to its extent began in 1753, when the northern part of it became Rowan County. In 1762 the western part of Anson County became Mecklenburg County. In 1779 the northern part of what remained of Anson County became Montgomery County, and the part east of the Pee Dee River became Richmond County. In 1842, western Anson County merged with southeastern Mecklenburg County to become Union County.

== Geography ==
According to the U.S. Census Bureau, the county has an area of 537.10 square miles (1,391.1 km^{2}), of which 531.46 square miles (1,376.5 km^{2}) is land and 5.64 square miles (14.6 km^{2}) (1.05%) is water. It is bordered by the North Carolina counties of Stanly, Montgomery, Richmond, and Union, and the South Carolina county of Chesterfield.

=== National protected area ===
- Pee Dee National Wildlife Refuge (part)

=== State and local protected areas/sites ===
- Arrowhead Lake
- Gaddy Covered Bridge
- Pee Dee River Game Land (part)
- Wadesboro Downtown Historic District

=== Major water bodies ===
- Blewett Falls Lake
- Brown Creek
- Goulds Fork
- Great Pee Dee River
- Lanes Creek
- Rocky River
- Thoroughfare Creek

=== Major highways ===
- US 52
- US 74
- US 74 Byp. (future bypass of Wadesboro)
- NC 109
- NC 145
- NC 218
- NC 742

=== Major infrastructure ===
- Anson County Airport

== Demographics ==
Historical population
Census	Pop.	Note	%±
1790	5,133		—
1800	8,146		58.7%
1810	8,831		8.4%
1820	12,534		41.9%
1830	14,095		12.5%
1840	15,077		7.0%
1850	13,489		−10.5%
1860	13,664		1.3%
1870	12,428		−9.0%
1880	17,994		44.8%
1890	20,027		11.3%
1900	21,870		9.2%
1910	25,465		16.4%
1920	28,334		11.3%
1930	29,349		3.6%
1940	28,443		−3.1%
1950	26,781		−5.8%
1960	24,962		−6.8%
1970	23,488		−5.9%
1980	25,649		9.2%
1990	23,474		−8.5%
2000	25,275		7.7%
2010	26,948		6.6%
2020	22,055		−18.2%
2025 (est.)	21,758	▼	−1.3%
U.S. Decennial Census; 1790–1960 1900–1990; 1990–2000 2010 2020

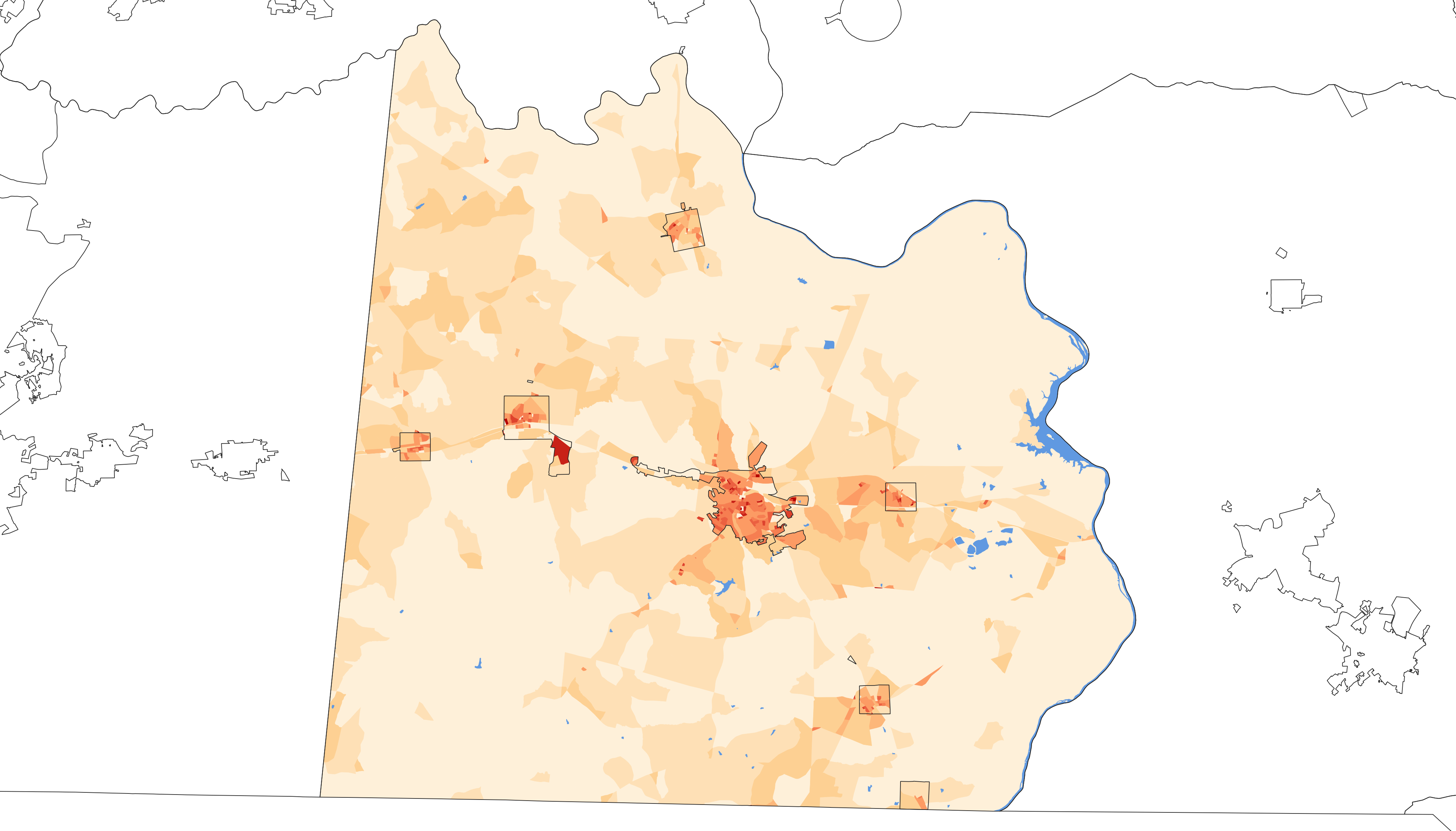
2020 population density of Anson County NC by census block

=== Racial and ethnic composition ===
Anson County, North Carolina – Racial and ethnic composition Note: the US Census treats Hispanic/Latino as an ethnic category. This table excludes Latinos from the racial categories and assigns them to a separate category. Hispanics/Latinos may be of any race.
Race / Ethnicity (NH = Non-Hispanic)	Pop 1980	Pop 1990	Pop 2000	Pop 2010	Pop 2020	% 1980	% 1990	% 2000	% 2010	% 2020
White alone (NH)	13,555	12,232	12,429	12,344	10,593	52.85%	52.11%	49.18%	45.81%	48.03%
Black or African American alone (NH)	11,741	11,078	12,245	13,038	9,838	45.78%	47.19%	48.45%	48.38%	44.61%
Native American or Alaska Native alone (NH)	60	69	110	148	89	0.23%	0.29%	0.44%	0.55%	0.40%
Asian alone (NH)	16	27	143	281	221	0.06%	0.12%	0.57%	1.04%	1.00%
Native Hawaiian or Pacific Islander alone (NH)	x	x	6	4	4	x	x	0.02%	0.01%	0.02%
Other race alone (NH)	5	1	18	27	38	0.02%	0.00%	0.07%	0.10%	0.17%
Mixed race or Multiracial (NH)	x	x	113	294	607	x	x	0.45%	1.09%	2.75%
Hispanic or Latino (any race)	272	67	211	812	665	1.06%	0.29%	0.83%	3.01%	3.02%
Total	25,649	23,474	25,275	26,948	22,055	100.00%	100.00%	100.00%	100.00%	100.00%

=== 2020 census ===
As of the 2020 census, the county had a population of 22,055 and 5,809 families; the median age was 44.5 years, with 19.1% of residents under the age of 18 and 20.3% aged 65 or older. For every 100 females there were 93.2 males, and for every 100 females age 18 and over there were 90.2 males.

There were 8,554 households in the county, of which 26.8% had children under the age of 18 living in them. Of all households, 38.5% were married-couple households, 20.9% were households with a male householder and no spouse or partner present, and 35.1% were households with a female householder and no spouse or partner present. About 31.7% of all households were made up of individuals and 15.4% had someone living alone who was 65 years of age or older.

There were 9,834 housing units, of which 13.0% were vacant. Among occupied housing units, 68.8% were owner-occupied and 31.2% were renter-occupied. The homeowner vacancy rate was 1.5% and the rental vacancy rate was 8.0%.

22.2% of residents lived in urban areas, while 77.8% lived in rural areas.

The racial makeup of the county was 48.5% White, 44.8% Black or African American, 0.5% American Indian and Alaska Native, 1.0% Asian, less than 0.1% Native Hawaiian and Pacific Islander, 2.0% from some other race, and 3.2% from two or more races. Hispanic or Latino residents of any race comprised 3.0% of the population.

Anson is a majority minority county. Between the 2010 and 2020 censuses, Anson's population declined by 18.2 percent.

=== 2010 census ===
At the 2010 census, there were 26,948 people. The racial makeup of the county was 48.58% African American, 47.15% White American, 1.07% Asian, 0.61% Native American, 1.25% multiracial and 1.32% of other race. People of Hispanic and Latino origin account for 3.02% of the population.

=== 2000 census ===
At the 2000 census, there were 25,275 people, 9,204 households, and 6,663 families residing in the county. The population density was 48 people per square mile (19 people/km^{2}). There were 10,221 housing units at an average density of 19 units per square mile (7.3 units/km^{2}). The racial makeup of the county was 51.64% Black or African American, 48.53% White, 0.45% Native American, 0.57% Asian, 0.02% Pacific Islander, 0.32% from other races, and 0.46% from two or more races. 0.83% of the population were Hispanic or Latino of any race.

There were 9,204 households, out of which 31.00% had children under the age of 18 living with them, 47.80% were married couples living together, 19.80% had a female householder with no husband present, and 27.60% were non-families. 25.10% of all households were made up of individuals, and 11.00% had someone living alone who was 65 years of age or older. The average household size was 2.59 and the average family size was 3.09.

In the county, the population was spread out, with 25.20% under the age of 18, 8.60% from 18 to 24, 29.00% from 25 to 44, 22.80% from 45 to 64, and 14.40% who were 65 years of age or older. The median age was 37 years. For every 100 females there were 96.50 males. For every 100 females age 18 and over, there were 95.80 males.

The median income for a household in the county was $29,849, and the median income for a family was $35,870. Males had a median income of $27,297 versus $20,537 for females. The per capita income for the county was $14,853. About 15.50% of families and 17.80% of the population were below the poverty line, including 23.90% of those under age 18 and 16.70% of those age 65 or over.

== Government and politics ==
Anson County is governed by a board of commissioners, which has seven members elected by district. The board of commissioners appoints a county manager, who oversees county administration and implements the board's policies.

Anson County is a member of the regional Centralina Council of Governments.

United States presidential election results for Anson County, North Carolina
Year	Republican		Democratic		Third party(ies)	
Year	No.	%	No.	%	No.	%
1912	125	7.23%	1,487	85.95%	118	6.82%
1916	301	12.82%	2,046	87.18%	0	0.00%
1920	433	12.00%	3,175	88.00%	0	0.00%
1924	225	8.58%	2,372	90.47%	25	0.95%
1928	726	19.77%	2,947	80.23%	0	0.00%
1932	223	4.98%	4,252	94.91%	5	0.11%
1936	381	7.60%	4,629	92.40%	0	0.00%
1940	371	7.54%	4,552	92.46%	0	0.00%
1944	510	12.46%	3,582	87.54%	0	0.00%
1948	447	12.05%	2,692	72.54%	572	15.41%
1952	1,843	30.79%	4,143	69.21%	0	0.00%
1956	1,640	31.31%	3,598	68.69%	0	0.00%
1960	1,597	27.93%	4,120	72.07%	0	0.00%
1964	1,721	29.34%	4,144	70.66%	0	0.00%
1968	1,474	18.39%	2,969	37.05%	3,571	44.56%
1972	3,551	60.88%	2,188	37.51%	94	1.61%
1976	1,608	25.04%	4,796	74.68%	18	0.28%
1980	1,968	27.77%	4,973	70.17%	146	2.06%
1984	3,719	42.45%	5,015	57.25%	26	0.30%
1988	2,782	36.45%	4,831	63.29%	20	0.26%
1992	2,334	27.33%	5,269	61.71%	936	10.96%
1996	2,193	28.81%	4,890	64.23%	530	6.96%
2000	3,161	39.59%	4,792	60.01%	32	0.40%
2004	3,796	41.15%	5,413	58.68%	16	0.17%
2008	4,207	39.20%	6,456	60.15%	70	0.65%
2012	4,166	37.01%	7,019	62.36%	71	0.63%
2016	4,506	42.73%	5,859	55.56%	180	1.71%
2020	5,321	47.53%	5,789	51.72%	84	0.75%
2024	5,525	50.80%	5,253	48.30%	97	0.89%

Like several neighboring rural counties, Anson County has historically favored Democratic nominees in most presidential elections. Since 2012, Republicans have had more success in the region, though Anson County voted more Democratic than its neighbors. The county has been depopulating, and the African American share of its population has been decreasing.

In 2016, the Democratic nominee, Hillary Clinton, won the county by 13 percentage points. In 2020 the Democratic nominee, Joe Biden, won by four. The county favored a Republican candidate for a federal office in 2022 and Donald Trump won the county in 2024, the first Republican presidential nominee to do so since Richard Nixon in 1972.

== Economy ==
Anson's economy was historically rooted in agriculture. It remains weaker than those of other counties in the region.

== Education ==
There are 11 schools in the Anson County Schools system that serve the students of the county.

The county is served by South Piedmont Community College, which has a campus near Polkton.

== Communities ==
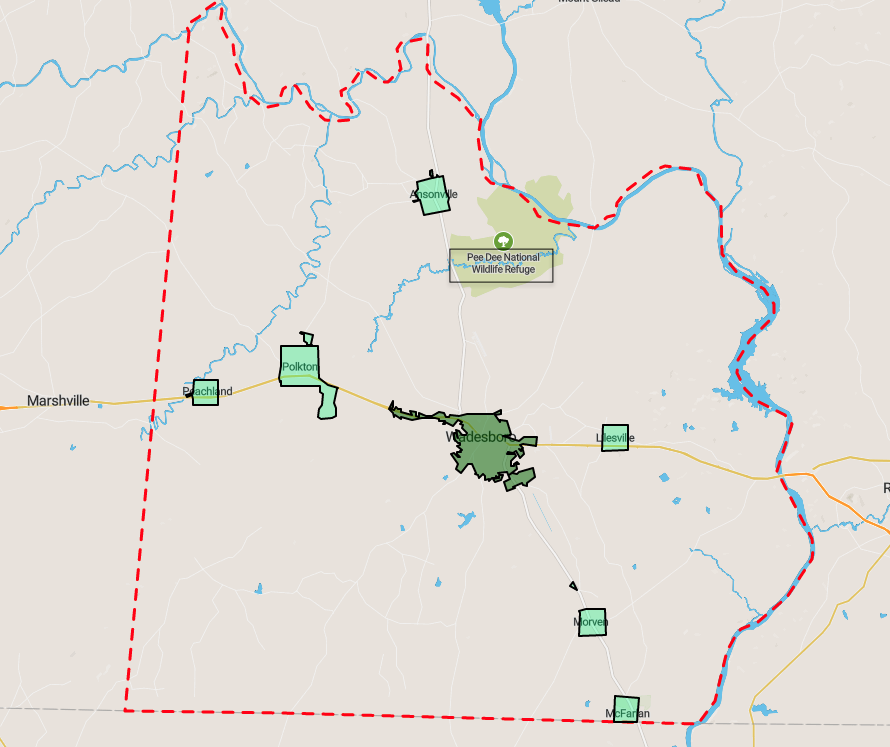
Clickable map of Anson County

=== Towns ===
- Ansonville
- Lilesville
- McFarlan
- Morven
- Peachland
- Polkton
- Wadesboro (county seat and largest community)

=== Unincorporated communities ===
- Burnsville
- Pee Dee

=== Townships ===
- Ansonville
- Burnsville
- Gulledge
- Lanesboro
- Lilesville
- Morven
- Wadesboro
- White Store

=== Ghost town ===
- Sneedsboro

=== Population ranking ===
The population ranking of the following table is based on the 2020 census of Anson County.

† = county seat

Rank	Name	Type	Population (2020 census)
1	† Wadesboro	Town	5,008
2	Polkton	Town	2,250
3	Ansonville	Town	440
4	Lilesville	Town	395
5	Peachland	Town	390
6	Morven	Town	329
7	McFarlan	Town	94

== Notable people ==
- Stephone Anthony (born 1992), NFL player
- Hugh Hammond Bennett (1881–1960), soil conservation specialist
- John Culpepper (1761–1841), U.S. representative and Baptist minister
- Blind Boy Fuller (1907–1941), blues guitarist and vocalist
- James Holland (1754–1823), U.S. representative
- David Lutz (born 1959), NFL player
- Juanita Moody (1924–2015), cryptographer whose intelligence gathering contributed greatly during the Cuban Missile Crisis
- Leonidas Lafayette Polk (1837–1892), first North Carolina Commissioner of Agriculture
- Sylvester Ritter (1952–1998), professional wrestler also known as "The Junkyard Dog" or "JYD"

== See also ==
- List of counties in North Carolina
- National Register of Historic Places listings in Anson County, North Carolina
- Anson County Regiment, militia in the American Revolution

== Works cited ==
- Corbitt, David Leroy (2000). The formation of the North Carolina counties, 1663-1943 (reprint ed.). Raleigh: North Carolina Division of Archives and History. OCLC 46398241.
- McCorkle, Mac; Salzberg, Rachel (January 2022), The Democrats' Countrypolitan Problem in North Carolina: Progressive Challenge and Opportunity (PDF), Duke University Polis: Center for Politics
- Powell, William S. (1976). The North Carolina Gazetteer: A Dictionary of Tar Heel Places. Chapel Hill: The University of North Carolina Press. ISBN 978-0-8078-1247-1.
- Vision 2040 : Anson County, North Carolina, Anson County Board of Commissioners, April 2021
