= North Carolina Highway 75 =

State highway in Union County, North Carolina, US

North Carolina Highway 75
- Waxhaw Highway

Route information
- Maintained by NCDOT
- Length: 12.8 mi (20.6 km)
- Existed: 1934–present

Major junctions
- West end: SC 75 at the South Carolina line near Hancock, SC
- NC 16 in Waxhaw
- East end: NC 200 in Monroe

Location
- Country: United States
- State: North Carolina
- Counties: Union

Highway system
- North Carolina Highway System; Interstate; US; State; Scenic
← US 74	→ US 76

North Carolina Highway 75, also known as the Waxhaw Highway in most of North Carolina (NC 75), is a primary state highway in the U.S. state of North Carolina. Its entire length runs through Union County and serves as the primary connector between the towns of Waxhaw, Mineral Springs, and Monroe. The route roughly parallels a CSX railroad line for its entire span.

== Route description ==
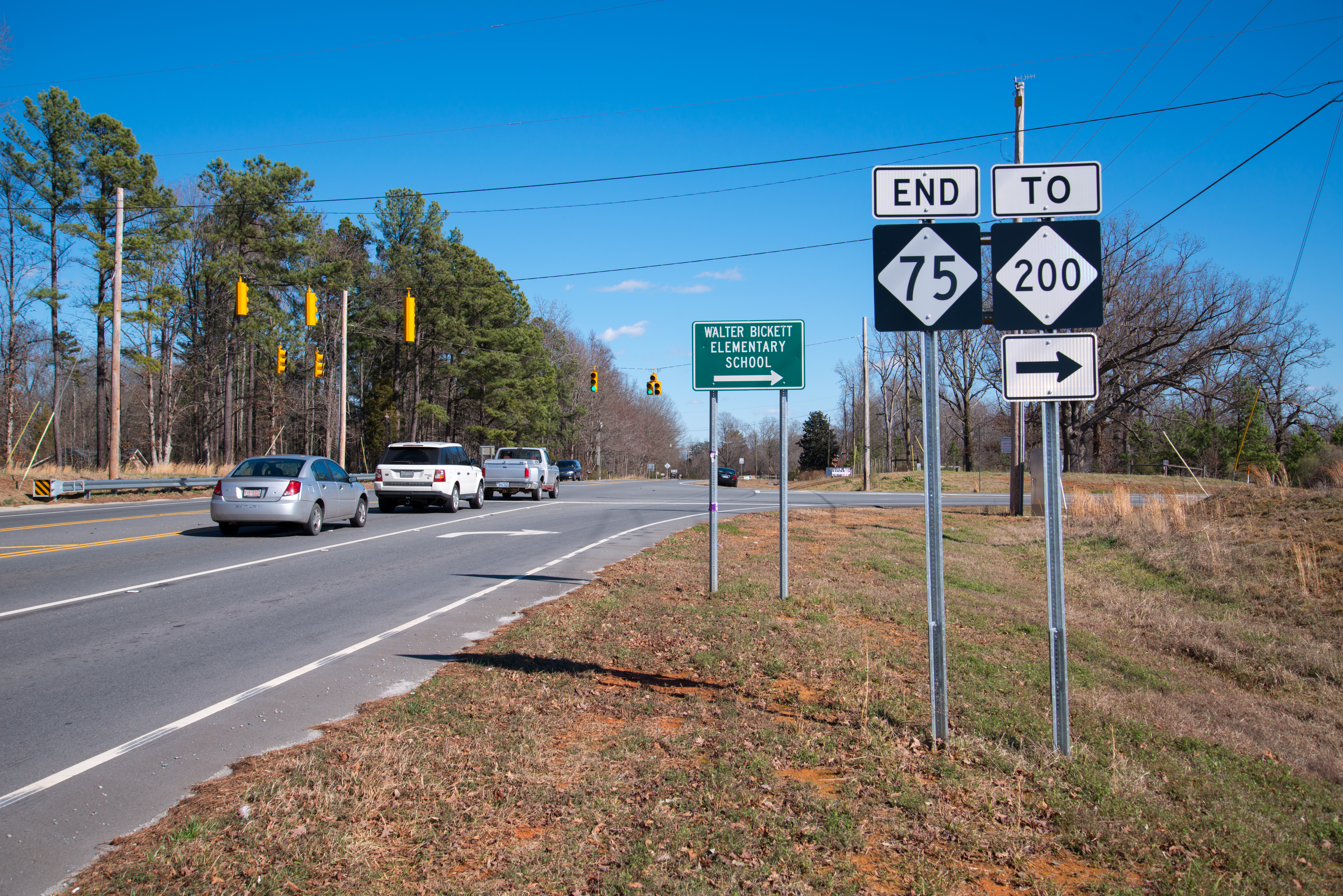
NC 75 end at the auxiliary road to NC 200

NC 75 starts at the North Carolina-South Carolina state line, near Hancock, South Carolina. In South Carolina, it continues as SC 75 for 8.2 miles (13.2 km) to SC 5, in Van Wyck.

Heading east from the state line, it becomes South Main Street in Waxhaw, where it connects with the southern terminus of NC 16, at Broome Street. Passing the Museum of the Waxhaws just outside town, it continues east to the town of Mineral Springs. It then goes northeast, passing Rocky River Road towards Monroe, where it ends abruptly at an auxiliary road to NC 200 (Martin Luther King Jr. Boulevard). Before August 2011, NC 75 continued into downtown Monroe, ending at Charlotte Avenue. The entire route, with exception of within Waxhaw city limits, is known and labeled as the Waxhaw Highway.

== History ==
The second and current NC 75 was established in 1934 as a renumbering of NC 25, it originally traveled from the South Carolina state line to US 74/NC 151 (Charlotte Avenue) in Monroe. Around 1957, NC 75 was extended east two blocks to NC 200 (Main Street), replacing part of US 74A. By 1962, NC 75 was extended again along Haynes Street/Skyway Drive to US 74/US 601 (Roosevelt Boulevard), in concurrency with NC 84 and NC 200. Between 1969 and 1982, the eastern terminus was moved back to Charlotte Avenue.

In August 2011, the eastern terminus of NC 75 was truncated at the auxiliary road to NC 200 (Martin Luther King Jr. Boulevard) after its completion as a bypass around Monroe.

The first NC 75 was an original state highway (1921); it traversed from NC 18, in Lenoir, to the Virginia state line, northeast of Oxford. It went across the state, through several cities and towns including Statesville, Asheboro, Pittsboro, Chapel Hill, and Durham. In 1927, NC 90 replaced NC 75 from Lenoir to Pittsboro while it was also rerouted south, replacing NC 53 through Sanford to Rockingham. In 1934, NC 75 was decommissioned; replaced by US 220 (Rockingham to Ellerbe), NC 73 (Ellerbe to West End), NC 2 (West End to Pinehurst), and US 15 (Pinehurst to the Virginia state line).

=== North Carolina Highway 25 ===
North Carolina Highway 25
- Location: SC state line–Monroe
- Length: 14.2 mi (22.9 km)
- Existed: 1921–1934

North Carolina Highway 25 (NC 25) was an original state highway that traversed from NC 20, in Monroe, southwest to SC 26, immediately across the state line. Around 1929, NC 25 was rerouted from Rehobeth Road to a more direct west route into South Carolina, towards Van Wyck. In 1934, the highway was renumbered as NC 75.

== Major intersections ==
The entire route is in Union County.

Location	mi	km	Destinations	Notes
	0.0	0.0	SC 75 west	South Carolina state line
Waxhaw	2.3	3.7	NC 16 north (Broome Street) – Weddington, Charlotte	Southern terminus of NC 16
Monroe	12.8	20.6	NC 200 (Martin Luther King Jr. Boulevard) – Charlotte, Lancaster	
1.000 mi = 1.609 km; 1.000 km = 0.621 mi
