= Sandy Ridge Township, Union County, North Carolina =

Coordinates: 34.98565°N 80.72690°W

- Township
- Location of Sandy Ridge Township in Union County

- Location of Union County in North Carolina
- Country: United States
- State: North Carolina
- County: Union

Area
  - Total: 65.68 sq mi (170.12 km^{2})
- Highest elevation (high point in northern part of Township): 768 ft (234 m)
- Lowest elevation (Floodplain of Twlevemile Creek where it flows out in southwestern part of township): 482 ft (147 m)

Population (2010)
  - Total: 45,672
  - Density: 695.27/sq mi (268.45/km^{2})
- Time zone: UTC-4 (EST)
  - Summer (DST): UTC-5 (EDT)
- Area code: 704

Sandy Ridge Township, population 45,672, is one of nine townships in Union County, North Carolina. Sandy Ridge Township is 65.69 square miles (170.1 km^{2}) in size and is located in southwestern Union County. This township contains the town of Weddington, as well as portions of the towns of Waxhaw, Mineral Springs, and Stallings. The villages of Marvin and Wesley Chapel are also located here.

== Geography ==
Twelvemile Creek and its tributaries drain most of the township except for the very northwestern part, which is drained by Sixmile Creek. Tributaries to Twelvemile Creek include: Blythe Creek, West Fork Twelvemile Creek, Bates Branch, Little Twelvemile Creek, Price Mill Creek, East Fork Twelvemile Creek, Molly Branch, and Tarkill Branch. Sixmile Creek has the tributaries of Marvin Branch and McBride Branch.
