= Vance Township, Union County, North Carolina =

Coordinates: 35.08271°N 80.65244°W

- Township
- Location of Vance Township in Union County

- Location of Union County in North Carolina
- Country: United States
- State: North Carolina
- County: Union

Area
  - Total: 39.88 sq mi (103.28 km^{2})
- Highest elevation (west side of township on S Fork Crooked Creek divide): 788 ft (240 m)
- Lowest elevation (Floodplain of Goose Creek on northeast side of township): 530 ft (160 m)

Population (2010)
  - Total: 52,497
  - Density: 1,316.37/sq mi (508.25/km^{2})
- Time zone: UTC-4 (EST)
  - Summer (DST): UTC-5 (EDT)
- Area code: 704

Vance Township is one of nine townships in Union County, North Carolina. Its population in 2010 was 52,497, making it the most populous township in the county. Vance Township is 39.88 square miles (103.3 km^{2}) in size and is located in northwest Union County. This township includes a small part of the City of Monroe, the towns of Indian Trail, Hemby Bridge, and Stallings, and the villages of Lake Park and Wesley Chapel.

== Geography ==
The extreme northern part of the township is drained by Goose Creek. Further to the south is drained by the North Fork of Crooked Creek, while the central part is drained by the South Fork of Crooked Creek. The south-central part of the township is drained by Price Mill Creek and going further south is drained by the East Fork of Twelve Mile Creek. The southwestern part of the township is drained by the South Fork of Twelve Mile Creek.
