= Jackson Township, Union County, North Carolina =

Coordinates: 34.87682°N 80.72229°W

- Township
- Location of Jackson Township in Union County

- Location of Union County in North Carolina
- Country: United States
- State: North Carolina
- County: Union

Area
  - Total: 59.14 sq mi (153.18 km^{2})
- Highest elevation (west central part of township): 772 ft (235 m)
- Lowest elevation (Floodplain of Waxhaw Creek on southwest side of township): 484 ft (148 m)

Population (2010)
  - Total: 11,012
  - Density: 186.2/sq mi (71.9/km^{2})
- Time zone: UTC-4 (EST)
  - Summer (DST): UTC-5 (EDT)
- Area code: 704

Jackson Township, population 11,012, is one of nine townships in Union County, North Carolina. Jackson Township is 59.14 square miles (153.2 km^{2}) in size and is located in southwest Union County. This township includes portions of the towns of Waxhaw and Mineral Springs, as well as the community of JAARS.

== Geography ==
The northern part of the township is drained by Twelvemile Creek and its tributaries, Lee Branch, Little Twelvemile Creek, and Blythe Creek. The southwest side is drained by Waxhaw Creek. The northwestern side is drained by Rone Branch.
