= North Carolina Highway 200 =

State highway in North Carolina, US

North Carolina Highway 200

Route information
- Maintained by NCDOT
- Length: 50.1 mi (80.6 km)
- Existed: 1930–present

Major junctions
- South end: SC 200 at the South Carolina state line near JAARS
- US 74 / US 601 in Monroe; NC 24 / NC 27 in Locust
- North end: US 601 near Concord

Location
- Country: United States
- State: North Carolina
- Counties: Union, Stanly, Cabarrus

Highway system
- North Carolina Highway System; Interstate; US; State; Scenic
← NC 198	→ NC 205

North Carolina Highway 200 (NC 200) is a primary state highway in the U.S. state of North Carolina. The highway runs north–south from the South Carolina state line near the community of JAARS, to US 601 near Concord.

== Route description ==
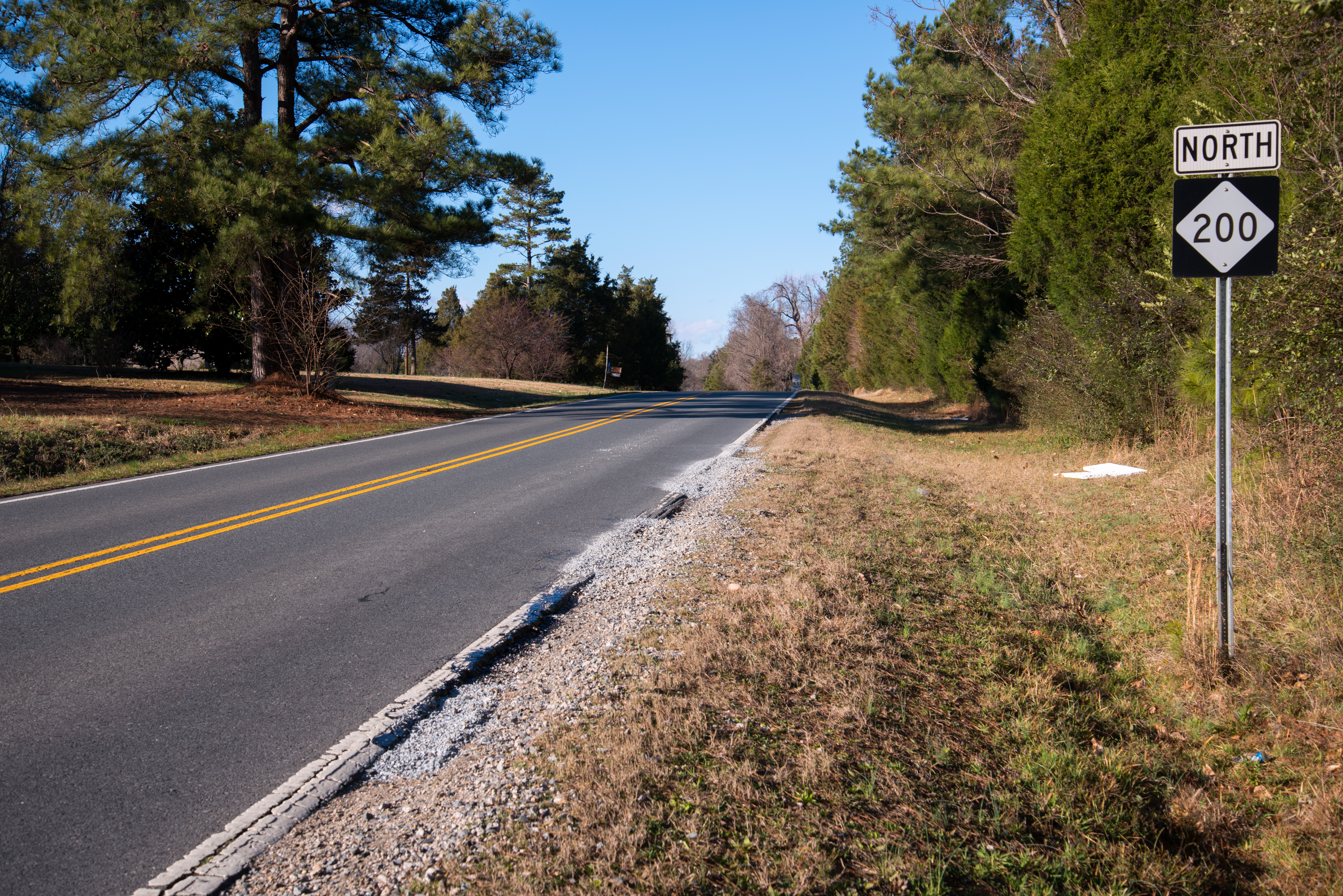
First sign for north NC 200 after the state line

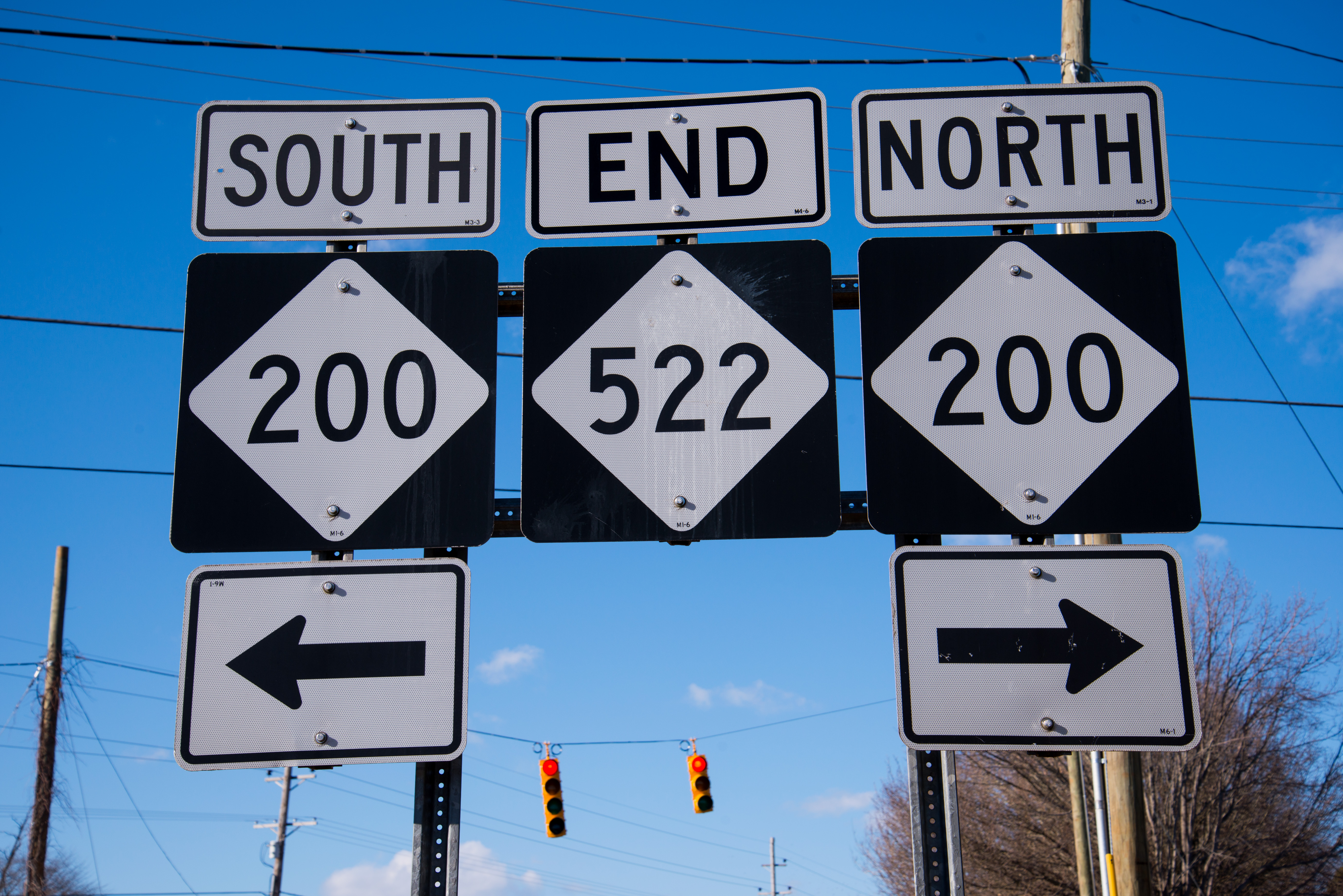
End of NC 522 at NC 200 in Roughedge

NC 200 traverses 50.1 miles (80.6 km), starting at the South Carolina state line, through the city of Monroe, and the towns of Stanfield and Locust, before ending at US 601 near Concord. For its length, it is a two-lane rural highway except in Monroe where it is a four-lane road from Charlotte Avenue to US 74 and a six-lane divided highway on its concurrency with US 74 and US 601.

== History ==
Established in 1930, it traveled from Monroe at US 74/NC 20/NC 25/NC 151 south to the South Carolina state line where it changed into SC 93 (renumbered to SC 200 in 1937). Between 1931 and 1936, NC 200 was realigned north of Old Highway Road near Jackson. In 1936, the highway was extended north via Franklin Street, Church Street, Winchester Street, and finally Morgan Mill Road to NC 27 in Locust. In 1942, the highway was extended again north to current terminus at NC 151 (renumbered to US 601 in 1951).

About 1958, NC 200 was rerouted in Monroe to follow Morrow Road and Haynes Street onto new bypass US 74/US 601, then return on Morgan Mill Road. By 1982, it had reverted to follow along Charlotte Avenue and Church Street.

NC 200 was rerouted northwest on a new road around downtown Monroe in August 2011 utilizing Martin Luther King Boulevard and Dickerson Boulevard to connect with US 74. The old alignment, Lancaster Avenue and Charlotte Avenue to Franklin Street, was downgraded to a secondary road. NC 75 was extended, replacing NC 200 from Franklin Street to Haynes Street, via Charlotte Avenue and Church Street. NC 207 was also extended, replacing NC 200 from Church Street to US 74/US 601 (Roosevelt Boulevard), along Haynes Street/Skyway Drive.

== Junction list ==
County	Location	mi	km	Destinations	Notes
Union		0.0	0.0	SC 200 west	Southern terminus; South Carolina state line
Union	Roughedge	9.0	14.5	NC 522 south (Rocky River Road)	Northern terminus of NC 522
Union	Monroe	15.3	24.6	NC 75 west (Waxhaw Highway) – Waxhaw	One-quadrant interchange; eastern terminus of NC 75
Union	Monroe	15.7	25.3	NC 84 (Weddington Road) – Weddington	Eastern terminus of NC 84
Union	Monroe	17.8	28.6	US 74 east (Roosevelt Boulevard) – Charlotte	South end of US 74 overlap
Union	Monroe	18.3– 18.5	29.5– 29.8	Concord Avenue	Interchange
Union	Monroe	18.8	30.3	US 601 north / NC 207 south (Skyway Drive) – Concord, Monroe Business District	Interchange; south end of US 601 overlap
Union	Monroe	20.0	32.2	US 74 east / US 601 south (Roosevelt Boulevard) – Wadesboro, Pageland	North end of US 74/US 601 overlaps
Union	Monroe			US 74 Byp. (Monroe Expressway) – Charlotte, Rockingham	All-electronic toll road
Union		31.4	50.5	NC 218 – Mint Hill, New Salem	
Stanly	Locust	41.9	67.4	NC 24 / NC 27 – Charlotte, Albemarle	
Cabarrus		50.1	80.6	US 601 – Concord, Monroe	Northern terminus
1.000 mi = 1.609 km; 1.000 km = 0.621 mi: Concurrency terminus; Tolled

== See also ==
- North Carolina Bicycle Route 6-Concurrent with NC 200 from Reed Mine Road to Mount Pleasant Road near Georgeville
