= Wesley Chapel, North Carolina =

- Village
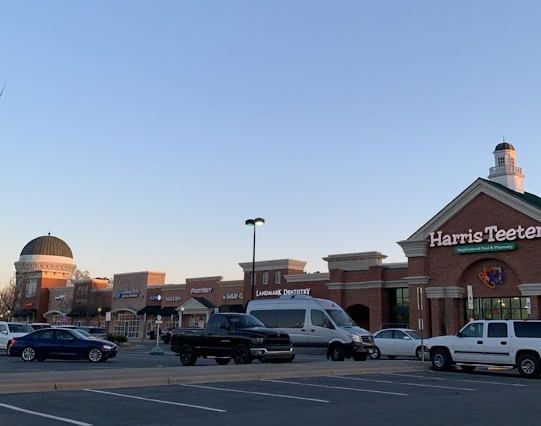
- Wesley Chapel Village Commons
- Motto: "A Great Place to Live and Raise a Family"
- Location of Wesley Chapel in North Carolina
- Coordinates: 35°00′20″N 80°40′04″W
- Country: United States
- State: North Carolina
- County: Union
- Incorporated: 1998
- Named for: Wesley's Chapel

Government
  - Mayor: Amanda Fuller
  - Council: Mike Como, Lori Bailey, David Boyce, Deb Bledsoe

Area
  - Total: 9.80 sq mi (25.39 km^{2})
  - Land: 9.72 sq mi (25.17 km^{2})
  - Water: 0.085 sq mi (0.22 km^{2})
- Elevation: 600 ft (180 m)

Population (2020)
  - Total: 8,681
  - Density: 893.2/sq mi (344.87/km^{2})
- Time zone: UTC-5 (Eastern (EST))
  - Summer (DST): UTC-4 (EDT)
- ZIP code: 28104, 28173, 28110, 28079, 28108
- Area codes: 704, 980
- FIPS code: 37-71940
- GNIS feature ID: 2407569
- Website: www.wesleychapelnc.com

Wesley Chapel is a village in Union County, North Carolina, United States. The population was 8,681 at the 2020 census and was estimated to be 9,566 in 2025.

== Geography ==
Wesley Chapel is located in the townships of Monroe and Sandy Ridge in eastern Union County, North Carolina. Part of the Charlotte metropolitan area, it sits east of Weddington, north of Waxhaw, west of Monroe, and south of Indian Trail.

According to the United States Census Bureau, the village has a total area of 9.8 square miles (25.39 km^{2}). It has a population density of 787.4 people per square mile. The majority of the village's area is land, aside from Price Mill Creek and some small residential ponds.

NC-84 passes through the village as Weddington Road. The village's main attractions are its central business district, known as Wesley Chapel Village Commons, and Dogwood Park.

== History ==
The village of Wesley Chapel's existence can be traced back to the establishment of Wesley Chapel United Methodist Church, one of many United Methodist churches to be named after Methodism founder John Wesley's chapel in London. The Wesley Chapel church was founded in 1832 on the remains of an abandoned campground outside nearby Mineral Springs known as McWhorter Campground. The community became first recognized in the early 20th century as residents of Monroe and Vance Township in the early 20th century declared themselves as part of the Wesley Chapel vicinity of Sandy Ridge Township, taking the name from the Methodist church.

The village was originally known as Price's Mill, named after the family of Joseph Price and his son James Newton Price. The Price family began as farmers but acquired a significant portion of the land of Wesley Chapel and contributed to much of the village's early development.

James Newton Price served in the North Carolina General Assembly for four terms, during which he established Wesley Chapel High School in 1901 and served as the first director of the Wesley Chapel School District Board of Trustees. Wesley Chapel High School was the first rural public high school in North Carolina. The school burnt down in 1955 and reopened in 1961 as Wesley Chapel Elementary School following the opening of Sun Valley High School in Indian Trail. The school was destroyed in a fire and rebuilt again in 1966.

Wesley Chapel was officially incorporated as a village of Union County in 1998.

== Demographics ==
Historical population
Census	Pop.	Note	%±
2000	2,549		—
2010	7,463		192.8%
2020	8,681		16.3%
2025 (est.)	9,566	▲	10.2%
U.S. Decennial Census

=== 2020 census ===
2020 racial makeup
Race	Number	Percentage
White (non-Hispanic)	6,849	78.9%
Black or African American (non-Hispanic)	660	7.6%
Hispanic or Latino	643	7.4%
Asian	296	3.4%
Other/Mixed	216	2.5%
Native American	17	0.2%
Pacific Islander	0	0.0%

As of the 2020 census, Wesley Chapel had a population of 8,681. The median age was 42.6 years. 27.1% of residents were under the age of 18 and 12.3% of residents were 65 years of age or older. For every 100 females there were 100.9 males, and for every 100 females age 18 and over there were 97.6 males age 18 and over.

89.0% of residents lived in urban areas, while 11.0% lived in rural areas.

There were 2,796 households in Wesley Chapel, of which 43.8% had children under the age of 18 living in them. Of all households, 77.6% were married-couple households, 7.5% were households with a male householder and no spouse or partner present, and 12.2% were households with a female householder and no spouse or partner present. About 10.8% of all households were made up of individuals and 5.0% had someone living alone who was 65 years of age or older.

There were 2,887 housing units, of which 3.2% were vacant. The homeowner vacancy rate was 1.4% and the rental vacancy rate was 4.2%.

=== Demographic estimates ===
96.2% of the population were homeowners, with the median home value being $368,200. The median income was $124,716, and 3.3% of the population lived below the poverty line.

66.2% of men and 53.1% of women in Wesley Chapel were employed. 85.7% of people above the age of 25 had a high school diploma, while 37.6% held a bachelor's degree or higher.

=== 2000 census ===
At the 2000 census there were 2,549 people, 867 households, and 762 families in the village. The population density was 302.8 inhabitants per square mile (116.9/km^{2}). There were 912 housing units at an average density of 108.3 per square mile (41.8/km^{2}). The racial makeup of the village was 97.02% White, 1.41% African American, 0.12% Native American, 0.31% Asian, 0.04% Pacific Islander, 0.35% from other races, and 0.75% from two or more races. Hispanic or Latino of any race were 1.88%.

Of the 867 households 43.9% had children under the age of 18 living with them, 79.4% were married couples living together, 5.5% had a female householder with no husband present, and 12.0% were non-families. 9.3% of households were one person and 2.5% were one person aged 65 or older. The average household size was 2.94 and the average family size was 3.14.

The age distribution was 29.1% under the age of 18, 6.2% from 18 to 24, 32.1% from 25 to 44, 25.9% from 45 to 64, and 6.7% 65 or older. The median age was 37 years. For every 100 females, there were 104.2 males. For every 100 females age 18 and over, there were 100.7 males.

The median household income was $74,188 and the median family income was $73,000. Males had a median income of $41,620 versus $30,739 for females. The per capita income for the village was $30,143. About 4.1% of families and 3.4% of the population were below the poverty line, including 2.4% of those under age 18 and 10.4% of those age 65 or over.
