= Marvin Ridge High School =

American public school in North Carolina

Location
- 2825 Crane Road; Waxhaw, North Carolina 28173; United States; 34°58′27″N 80°47′47″W

Information
- Type: Public
- Motto: "Passport to the World"
- Established: 2007 (19 years ago)
- School district: Union County Public Schools
- CEEB code: 342528
- Principal: Matt Lasher
- Staff: 95.84 (FTE)
- Grades: 9–12
- Enrollment: 2,050 (2023–2024)
- Student to teacher ratio: 21.39
- Colors: Orange and royal blue
- Athletics: NCHSAA 7A
- Athletics conference: Southern Carolina 6A/7A
- Mascot: Marty the Maverick
- Nickname: Mavericks
- Team name: Marvin Ridge Mavericks
- Website: mrhs.ucpsnc.org

Marvin Ridge High School (commonly Marvin, Marvin Ridge, or MRHS) is a public high school in Marvin, North Carolina, United States serving students in grades 9–12. The school is part of the Union County Public School system. The school occupies a two-story building with a full auditorium and fully air-conditioned gym. Admission is based primarily on the location of students' homes and district lines. Marvin Ridge High was ranked 1st among the 300–399 cohort size for having a 99.3 percent graduation rate in North Carolina. It is ranked the 275th best high school in the country in 2017 by U.S. News & World Report.

== History ==
Marvin Ridge High was founded in 2007 with Steven Rankin PHD as the first principal of the school, to reduce overcrowding at the neighboring Weddington High School, transferring about half of the student body to the new school.

The school serves neighborhoods in the Marvin, and Waxhaw, North Carolina areas. Three elementary schools, Rea View Elementary, Marvin Elementary, and Sandy Ridge Elementary, feed into the school, as does Marvin Ridge Middle School (located directly behind Marvin Ridge High School).

== Demographics ==
The school is ranked a ten out of ten on the "Great Schools" website However, the diversity rates tend to be less than the state average for every ethnicity with the exception of white/caucasian. There are 80% White students, 10% Asian, 4% Hispanic, 4% Black, and less than 1% American Indian or Alaskan Native.

== Academics ==
Marvin Ridge was named a North Carolina Honor School of Excellence with High Growth in 2009–2010. The school has a college preparatory orientation, offering a variety of Honors and Advanced Placement classes as well as the only International Baccalaureate Diploma program in the Union County schools. The school offers nineteen Advanced Placement courses, five foreign languages (Spanish, French, German, Chinese, and Latin). The Distance Learning Program is also offered through the internet through Odyssey-ware. EOC results for the senior class of 2010 for Marvin Ridge was above district and state averages in every subject. The school actually had a 100% passing rate in Biology, Civics and Economics, U.S. History, and English 101. The school was named the Honor School of Excellence for 2008–2009 and 2009–2010 by the State Department of Education for having a 91.3% or higher average on EOC tests. Thus far the school has also met all Adequate Yearly Progress goals under the No Child Left Behind guidelines. It has the highest English II Writing Scores in 2008–2009 in Union County.

== Athletics ==
Marvin Ridge is a member of the North Carolina High School Athletic Association (NCHSAA) and are classified as a 7A school. The school is a part of the Southern Carolina 6A/7A Conference. Marvin Ridge's school colors are orange and blue, and its team name is the Mavericks. Listed below are the different sports that Marvin Ridge offers for its students:

- Baseball
- Basketball
- Competition Cheerleading
- Cross Country
- Football
- Golf
- Lacrosse
- Soccer
- Softball
- Swimming
- Tennis
- Indoor/Outdoor Track & Field
- Volleyball
- Wrestling

== Clubs ==
There are over forty active clubs at Marvin Ridge.

=== Student council ===
The Marvin Ridge High School Student Council is a North Carolina Association of Student Councils (NCASC), Southern Association of Student Councils (SASC), and National Association of Student Councils (NASC) member school and has been recognized every year as a NCASC Clinton Blake Honor Council since 2009. Marvin Ridge served as the North Carolina Western District Chair School during the 2014–2015 school year and the North Carolina Communications Officer School during the 2015–2016 school year. The Student Council boosts "Maverick Pride" and school morale around the halls of Marvin Ridge High School. They host events such as talent shows, Sadie Hawkins, prom, and many more.

=== FBLA ===
The MRHS FBLA .

=== Speech and debate ===
In 2011 the Marvin Ridge Speech and Debate team placed as the second best Speech and Debate team in the state. In 2010 there were six qualifiers for the National Forensics League

=== Marching band ===
The MRHS Marching Mavericks have enjoyed great success and have traveled across the country competing in numerous competitions. The band also traveled to Ireland in the Spring of 2012 to perform in the Dublin Saint Patrick's Day Parade.

=== Theatre ===
The school's Theatre Arts program offers experience in acting, directing, playwrighting, technical theatre, and dramaturgy. The school has put on four or five productions each year

The school also has an improvisational group, "Check". This improvisation troupe entered the Special Olympics in Rock Hill on March 19, 2011, and won first place.

=== Visual Arts ===
The school's Visual Arts program offers varied experience in fine art, photography, mixed media, sculpting, and pottery. Students have placed in exhibitions and competitions such as the Scholastic Art Awards, Waxhaw Kaleidoscope, Union County Student Artist Showcase, ArtPop Street Gallery, NCMA Teen Exhibition, and U.S. Congressional Art Competition (2025, 2026).

=== Choir ===
The school's Choir performed at the Carnegie Hall in the spring of 2011.

=== HOSA ===
The largest club at Marvin Ridge High School is HOSA a health occupational club targeted at creating "future health professionals" who are interested in pursuing the medical field.

== Notable alumni ==
- K. J. Brent, former NFL wide receiver
- Kyle Parker, professional soccer player
- Vinnie Sunseri, former NFL safety and current football coach; attended through Junior year
