= Sun Valley High School (North Carolina) =

American public school in North Carolina

Location
- 5211 Old Charlotte Highway; Monroe, North Carolina 28110; United States; 35°02′47″N 80°38′43″W

Information
- Type: Public
- Established: 1961 (65 years ago)
- Status: Open
- School district: Union County Public Schools
- Superintendent: Andrew Houlihan
- CEEB code: 342685
- Principal: Mike Harvey
- Teaching staff: 78.25 (FTE)
- Grades: 9–12
- Enrollment: 1,383 (2023–2024)
- Student to teacher ratio: 17.67
- Colors: Maroon and gold
- Song: Michigan State Fight Song
- Athletics: NCHSAA 6A
- Athletics conference: Southern Carolina 6A/7A
- Team name: Spartans
- Newspaper: Spartan Shield
- Feeder schools: Indian Trail, Shiloh, Sun Valley, Rocky River
- Website: svhs.ucpsnc.org

Sun Valley High School (SVHS) is a public high school in Union County, North Carolina. Sun Valley is part of Union County Public Schools. It is located between Monroe and Indian Trail.

== History ==
Sun Valley was founded in 1961. For decades, it was the only high school in western Union County. Three new high schools have been built in the area since the 2000s, partially relieving the crowded conditions that persisted at the school for many years.

The school presently serves all of Wesley Chapel, eastern Indian Trail, eastern Weddington and part of western Monroe. This was a result of redistricting on behalf of the Union County Public School board.

== Athletics ==
Sun Valley is a member of the North Carolina High School Athletic Association (NCHSAA) and are classified as a 6A school. The school is a part of the Southern Carolina 6A/7A Conference. Sun Valley's team name are the Spartans, with the school colors being maroon and gold. Listed below are the different sports Sun Valley has to offer for its students:

- Baseball
- Basketball
- Competition Cheerleading
- Cross Country
- Football
- Golf
- Lacrosse
- Soccer
- Softball
- Swimming
- Tennis
- Indoor/Outdoor Track & Field
- Volleyball
- Wrestling

== Notable alumni ==
- Robert Greene, "filmmaker-in-chief" at the Murray Center for Documentary Journalism at the University of Missouri
- Sam Howell, NFL quarterback, played collegiately at North Carolina
- Michael Macchiavello, American freestyle and folkstyle wrestler, won NCAA wrestling national championship at NC State
- Claire Ritter, musician
