= Fairview, North Carolina =

Fairview, North Carolina may refer to:

- Fairview, Buncombe County, North Carolina, a census-designated place in Buncombe County, North Carolina
- Fairview, Union County, North Carolina, an incorporated town in Union County, North Carolina
