= Brief, North Carolina =

- Populated place
- Location within the state of North Carolina
- Coordinates: 35°11′25″N 80°32′00″W
- Country: United States
- State: North Carolina
- County: Union
- Established: 2001
- Elevation: 492 ft (150 m)
- Time zone: UTC-5 (Eastern (EST))
  - Summer (DST): UTC-4 (EDT)
- ZIP code: 28079-28110
- Area code: 704 980
- GNIS feature ID: 981883

Brief is an unincorporated community in Union County, North Carolina, United States. Brief is located just north of the town of Fairview.
