= Union Academy (Monroe, North Carolina) =

American public charter school in North Carolina

Location
- 675 N. Martin Luther King Jr. Blvd. Monroe, North Carolina 28110; United States; 34°59′27″N 80°34′46″W

Information
- Other name: Union Academy Charter School, Union Academy Pre-K and Professional Development Center
- Type: Public charter
- Motto: "At Union Academy, we do the right thing, even when no one is looking."
- Founded: 2000 (26 years ago)
- CEEB code: 342684
- Headmaster: Amy Yermack
- Grades: K–12
- Age range: 4 - 18
- Schedule: 8:15 AM to 3:00 PM
- Campuses: Upper Campus, Lower Campus
- Colors: Red and blue
- Athletics: Football, Soccer, Golf, Baseball, Basketball, Wrestling, Tennis, Track & Field, Cross Country, Swimming and Volleyball
- Mascot: Cardinal
- Team name: Cardinals
- Website: www.unionacademy.org

Union Academy is a K-12 public charter school in Monroe, North Carolina, USA. The school operates two facilities—the main building located at 675 N. M.L.K Blvd, and a Pre-K and Professional Development Center, located at 3282 Old Charlotte Hwy. Union Academy is the first and longest operating Charter school in Union County, North Carolina.

The school was founded in 2000, and celebrated its 25th anniversary during the 24-25 school year.

== Expansion ==
In 2017, Union Academy invested $4 million into an expansion for the Upper Campus, relocating K-4 from the Lower Campus. The Lower Campus was repurposed as a Pre-K for the school.

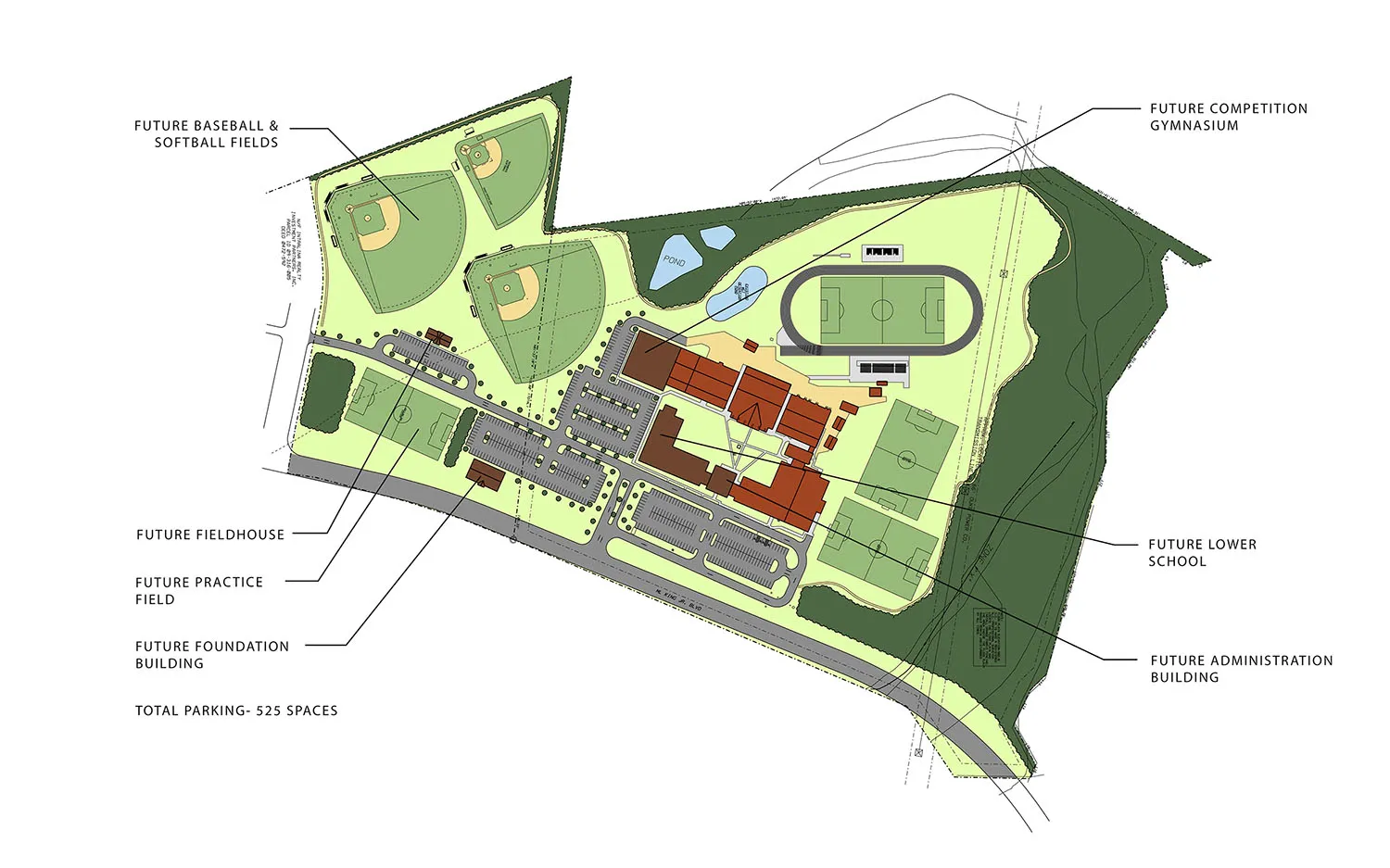
Masterplan proposed for Union Academy.

Union Academy plans to add the following additions to the Upper Campus (as noted in the masterplan):

- Canopies for both carpools (South and North)
- Performing Arts Center
- Agriculture Center
- Additional Classroom Building
- New High-School dropoff (+canopies)
- Circulation Road (used for transport across campus)
- Storage Addition (Media Center)
- Renovation of Courtyard
- Alumni Plaza
- Fields Upgraded to Turf
- "Welcome Plaza" & Bike Racks (intended for students who walk/bike)
- Campus-wide hallway & restroom renovations
- HVAC relocation (privacy concerns)

These renovations and more can be found in a slideshow linked to by Union Academy's website.

== Criticism ==
Union Academy has faced criticism numerous times, mostly related to safety concerns.

- A report published on May 30, 2025 found that Monroe Police were able to get into the building undercover for approx. 20 minutes.
- A student snuck a knife into the school and was able to threaten a student with it.
- Basketball coach Barney Harris attempted to rob a stash house related to the Mexican Cartel and was fatally shot.

== Notable awards and alumni ==
- Caleb Surratt, professional golfer on the PGA Tour
- Jayden Delgado and Emmanuel Bee Jr., both MLS NEXT soccer players
- Union Academy is a three time Character.org School of Character award winner and in 2026 was the only recipient in North Carolina.
- Union Academy won the Gold Collage Preparedness Medal in 2019 and 2020.
