= Brandon Oaks, North Carolina =

Neighborhood in Union County, North Carolina

Coordinates: 35.0692°N 80.6999°W

Brandon Oaks is a subdivision located in Union County, North Carolina. Its main road is Brandon Oaks Parkway.

The subdivision has its own swim team, the Brandon Oaks Sharks, which competes in the Greater Charlotte Swim League (GCSL).
