= South Carolina Highway 75 =

State highway in South Carolina, United States

South Carolina Highway 75

Route information
- Maintained by SCDOT
- Length: 8.110 mi (13.052 km)
- Existed: 1937–present

Major junctions
- West end: SC 5 near Van Wyck
- US 521 from near Van Wyck to Hancock
- East end: NC 75 at the North Carolina state line near Waxhaw, NC

Location
- Country: United States
- State: South Carolina
- Counties: Lancaster

Highway system
- South Carolina State Highway System; Interstate; US; State; Scenic
← SC 72	→ US 76

South Carolina Highway 75 (SC 75) is an 8.110-mile (13.052 km) state highway in the U.S. state of South Carolina. The highway is mainly rural.

== Route description ==
The western terminus of SC 75 is located at an intersection with SC 5 near Van Wyck. Much of the highway has a 55 mph (89 km/h) speed limit. Heading east, SC 75 passes the AME Zion Church and Van Wyck's farmland as well as the "downtown" of the tiny community. Two miles to the east, SC 75 intersects US 521 and is concurrent with the highway until they split three miles to the north in the unincorporated community of Hancock. Here, US 521 continues north and SC 75 turns east, traveling two miles until it ends at the North Carolina state line, the roadway continuing east as North Carolina Highway 75 toward Monroe, North Carolina.

== History ==
Established in 1937 as a renumbering of SC 12, it originally ran from US 521 to the North Carolina state line in Hancock. By 1964, SC 75 was extended to its current western terminus at SC 5 in Van Wyck, replacing part of SC 504.

== Major intersections ==
The entire route is in Lancaster County.

Location	mi	km	Destinations	Notes
	0.000	0.000	SC 5 (Rock Hill Highway / SC 75 Truck north) / Riverside Road south	Southern terminus of SC 75 and SC 75 Truck; roadway continues as Riverside Road.
	3.020	4.860	US 521 south / SC 75 Truck south (Charlotte Highway) / East Rebound Road east – Lancaster, Andrew Jackson State Park	Southern end of US 521 concurrency; northern terminus of SC 75 Truck
	6.370	10.252	US 521 north (Charlotte Highway) – Charlotte	Northern end of US 521 concurrency
	8.110	13.052	NC 75 east	Continuation into North Carolina
1.000 mi = 1.609 km; 1.000 km = 0.621 mi: Concurrency terminus

== Van Wyck truck route ==
South Carolina Highway 75 Truck
- Location: Van Wyck
- Length: 4.63 mi (7.45 km)

South Carolina Highway 75 Truck (SC 75 Truck) is a 4.6-mile-long (7.4 km) truck route of SC 75 bypassing Van Wyck. It begins at SC 75's southern terminus at SC 5. It follows SC 5 until it has an interchange with U.S. Route 521 (US 521). It then follows US 521 until they meet SC 75.
