= Jackson, Union County, North Carolina =

Jackson
- Unincorporated community
- Location within the state of North Carolina
- Coordinates: 34°52′01″N 80°41′00″W
- Country: United States
- State: North Carolina
- County: Union County
- Elevation: 640 ft (195 m)
- Time zone: UTC-5 (Eastern (EST))
  - Summer (DST): UTC-4 (EDT)
- ZIP code: 28173
- Area codes: 704, 980
- GNIS feature ID: 1006253

Jackson is an unincorporated community in Union County, North Carolina, United States. It is named in honor of Andrew Jackson, who was born near the area. It is located southwest of Monroe, at the intersection of NC 200 (Lancaster Highway) and Potter Road.

It is not to be confused with the larger town of Jackson.
