= Van Wyck, South Carolina =

- Town
- Location within South Carolina Location within the United States
- Coordinates: 34°51′31″N 80°51′45″W
- Country: United States
- State: South Carolina
- County: Lancaster
- Established: 2017

Government
  - Type: Mayor-council

Area
  - Total: 10.08 sq mi (26.12 km^{2})
  - Land: 10.03 sq mi (25.99 km^{2})
  - Water: 0.050 sq mi (0.13 km^{2})
- Elevation: 541 ft (165 m)

Population (2020)
  - Total: 848
  - Density: 84.5/sq mi (32.63/km^{2})
- Time zone: UTC-5 (Eastern (EST))
  - Summer (DST): UTC-4 (EDT)
- ZIP code: 29744
- Area codes: 803, 839
- FIPS code: 45-73555
- GNIS feature ID: 2791461
- Website: townofvanwyck.net

Van Wyck is a town in the panhandle of Lancaster County, South Carolina, United States. As of the 2020 census, Van Wyck had a population of 848. Van Wyck is 29 miles (47 km) south of Charlotte, North Carolina and is part of the Charlotte metropolitan area.

== History ==
Established in the 1880s, it was to be originally named "Cocheecho", after a young Indian chief, by the Seaboard Air Line Railroad. The community opted for "Little Waxhaw" instead; however, this caused issues with the U.S. Postal Service because of confusion with nearby Waxhaw, North Carolina. The name was soon changed to "Heaths", to honor the family who gave the land for the depot, but this name was quickly dropped because of confusion with Heath Springs, South Carolina. An agent of the railroad stepped in and proposed naming the community in honor of his wife's family in upstate New York. The name "Van Wyck" comes from a Dutch habitational name for someone from any of the many places in the Netherlands named Wijk, from the Dutch word wijk, meaning "district" or "settlement". There are several ways of pronouncing the name of the community—"Van Wick", "Van Wack", and "Van Wike". Families who have lived in the area since its founding in the 1880s generally pronounce it "Van Wike".

On August 15, 2017, the residents of the community voted to incorporate it as a town. Sean Corcoran was the first mayor.

The Adam Ivy House and Massey-Doby-Nisbet House were listed on the National Register of Historic Places in 1990.

== Geography ==
Van Wyck is in northern Lancaster County, between the Catawba River to the west and Union County, North Carolina, to the east. U.S. Route 521 passes through the eastern part of the town limits, leading south 10 miles (16 km) to Lancaster, the county seat, and north 29 miles (47 km) to Charlotte. South Carolina Highway 5 passes through the southern part of the town, terminating to the east at US-521 and leading west 12 miles (19 km) to Rock Hill. Highway 75 (West Rebound Road) passes through the central part of town, just south of the original town center.

== Demographics ==
Historical population
| Census | Pop. | Note | %± |
|---|---|---|---|
| 2020 | 848 | | — |
U.S. Decennial Census

== Notable resident ==
- Shawn Crawford, Olympic runner
