= Adam Ivy House =

Historic house in South Carolina, United States

- U.S. National Register of Historic Places
- Location within South Carolina Location within the United States
- Location: South Carolina Highway 55, 1.5 miles southwest of its junction with County Road 2109, near Van Wyck, South Carolina
- Coordinates: 34°53′25″N 80°51′37″W
- Area: 3.9 acres (1.6 ha)
- Built: c. 1849-1850
- Architectural style: Late 19th And Early 20th Century American Movements, Greek Revival
- MPS: Lancaster County MPS
- NRHP reference No.: 89002144
- Added to NRHP: September 4, 1990

Adam Ivy House is a historic home located near Van Wyck, Lancaster County, South Carolina. It was built about 1849–1850, and is a two-story, vernacular Greek Revival style frame dwelling. It has a full-width, one-story front porch. Additions and renovations took place around 1920. Also on the property are two contributing outbuildings; large and small barns located near the house.

It was added to the National Register of Historic Places in 1990.
