= North Carolina Highway 84 =

State highway in Union County, North Carolina, US

North Carolina Highway 84
- Weddington Road

Route information
- Maintained by NCDOT
- Length: 11.6 mi (18.7 km)
- Existed: 1938–present

Major junctions
- West end: NC 16 in Weddington
- East end: NC 200 in Monroe

Location
- Country: United States
- State: North Carolina
- Counties: Union

Highway system
- North Carolina Highway System; Interstate; US; State; Scenic
← NC 83	→ I-85

North Carolina Highway 84 (NC 84) is a primary state highway in the U.S. state of North Carolina. It serves to connect the town of Weddington to the city of Monroe.

== Route description ==
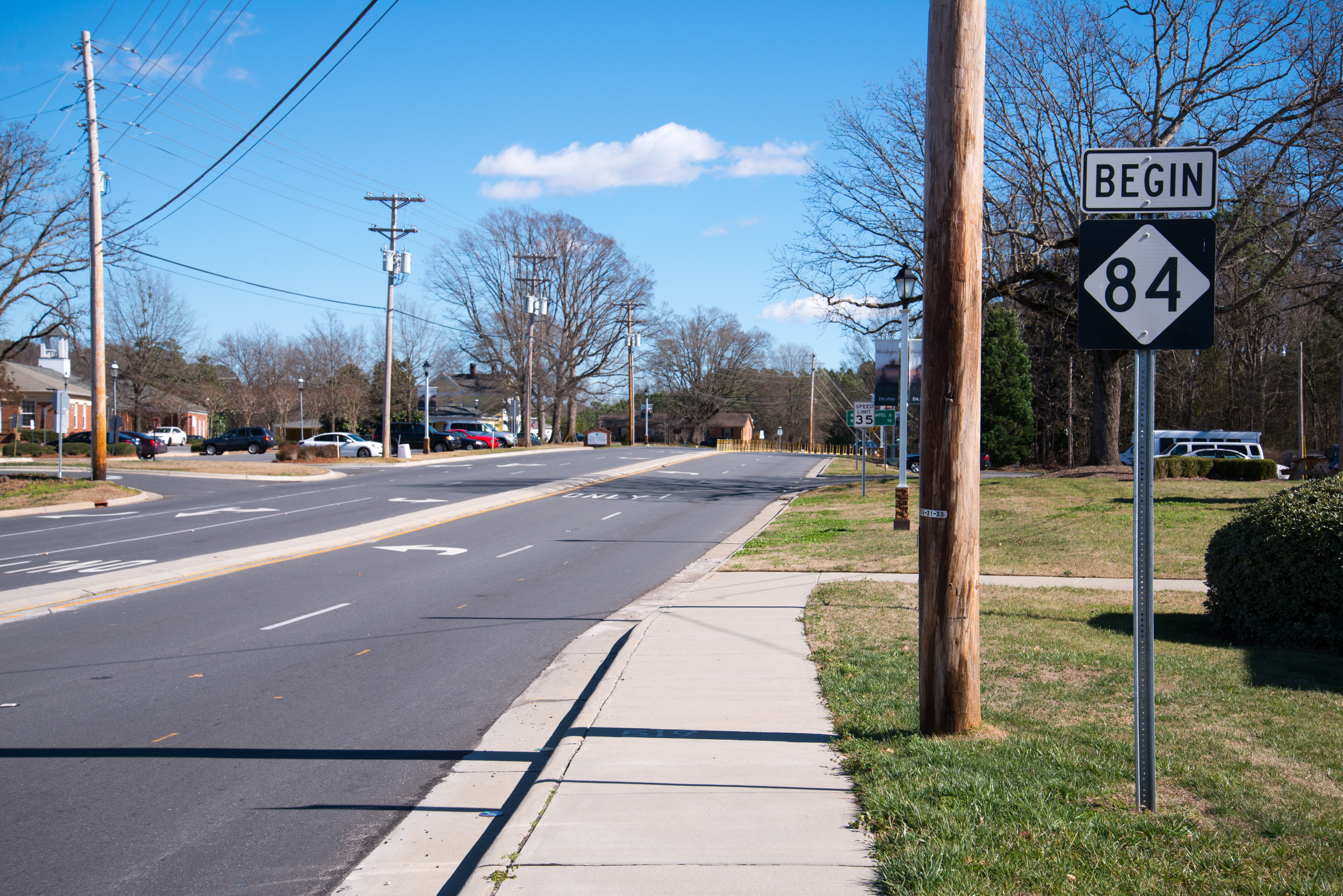
Begin of NC 84 in Weddington

NC 84 begins at an intersection with NC 16 (Providence Road) in Weddington, carrying the name Weddington Road. It carries two undivided lanes of traffic eastward, with a 35 miles per hour (56 km/h) speed limit before leaving town. Immediately after its western terminus is a roundabout with Weddington–Matthews Road. The route also passes by Weddington's town hall. The route then enters wooded land, serving mostly homes along its route with a few open fields along the way. The route then passes through Wesley Chapel, where it serves a shopping area (at the Waxhaw Indian Trail Road intersection) and passes between several residential subdivisions. As it nears Monroe, it connects with NC 200 (Martin Luther King Jr. Boulevard), where it ends.

== History ==
Established in 1936 as a new primary routing, it traveled from NC 262 (Providence Road) to U.S. Route 74 (US 74) and NC 151 (Charlotte Avenue). Between 1956 and 1957, NC 84 was extended two blocks to Main Street, replacing part of US 74A to NC 200. By 1962, NC 84 was extended north to US 74 (Roosevelt Boulevard), with NC 200 along Hayne Street/Skyway Drive. Sometime between 1969-1982, the eastern terminus was moved back to Charlotte Avenue.

In August 2011, the eastern terminus of NC 84 was truncated at NC 200 (Martin Luther King Jr. Boulevard) after its completion as a bypass around Monroe.

== Major intersections ==
The entire route is in Union County.

Location	mi	km	Destinations	Notes
Weddington	0.0	0.0	NC 16 (Providence Road) to I-485	
Monroe	11.6	18.7	NC 200 (Martin Luther King Jr Boulevard) to US 74 – Lancaster	
1.000 mi = 1.609 km; 1.000 km = 0.621 mi
