= Massey-Doby-Nisbet House =

Historic house in South Carolina, United States

- U.S. National Register of Historic Places
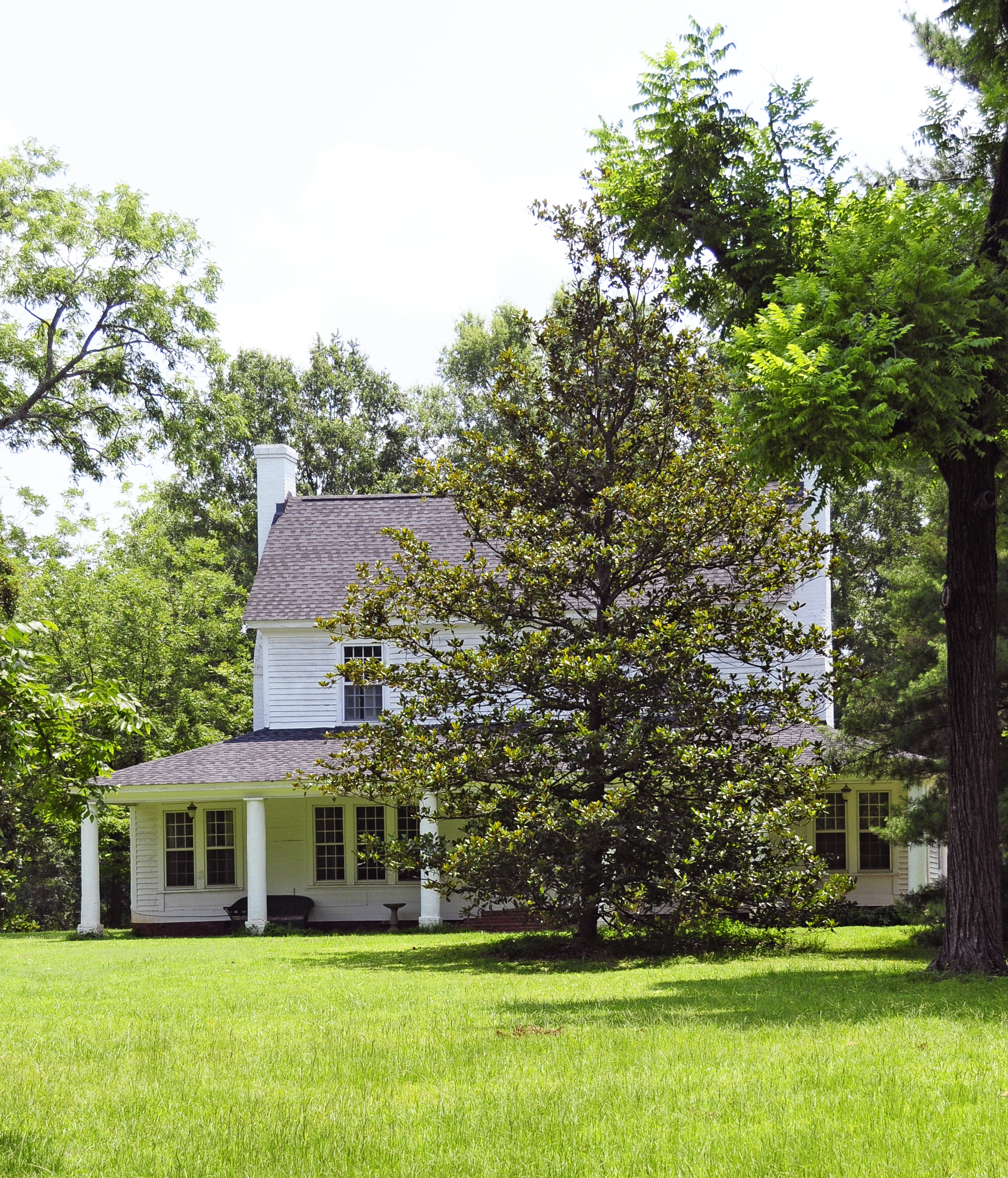
- Massey-Doby-Nisbet House, July 2012

- Location within South Carolina Location within the United States
- Location: South Carolina Highway 55, southwest of County Road 2109, near Van Wyck, South Carolina
- Coordinates: 34°52′51″N 80°51′47″W
- Area: 5.5 acres (2.2 ha)
- Built: c. 1790, c. 1830, c. 1935
- Architectural style: Federal
- MPS: Lancaster County MPS
- NRHP reference No.: 90000095
- Added to NRHP: February 16, 1990

Massey-Doby-Nisbet House is a historic home located near Van Wyck, Lancaster County, South Carolina. It was built about 1790, and was originally two stories with one room on each floor (an I-house type). The house was enlarged and remodeled about 1830, which doubled the size and added Federal detailing. The house was remodeled again about 1935.

It was added to the National Register of Historic Places in 1990.
