= Union County, North Carolina =

County in North Carolina, United States

- County
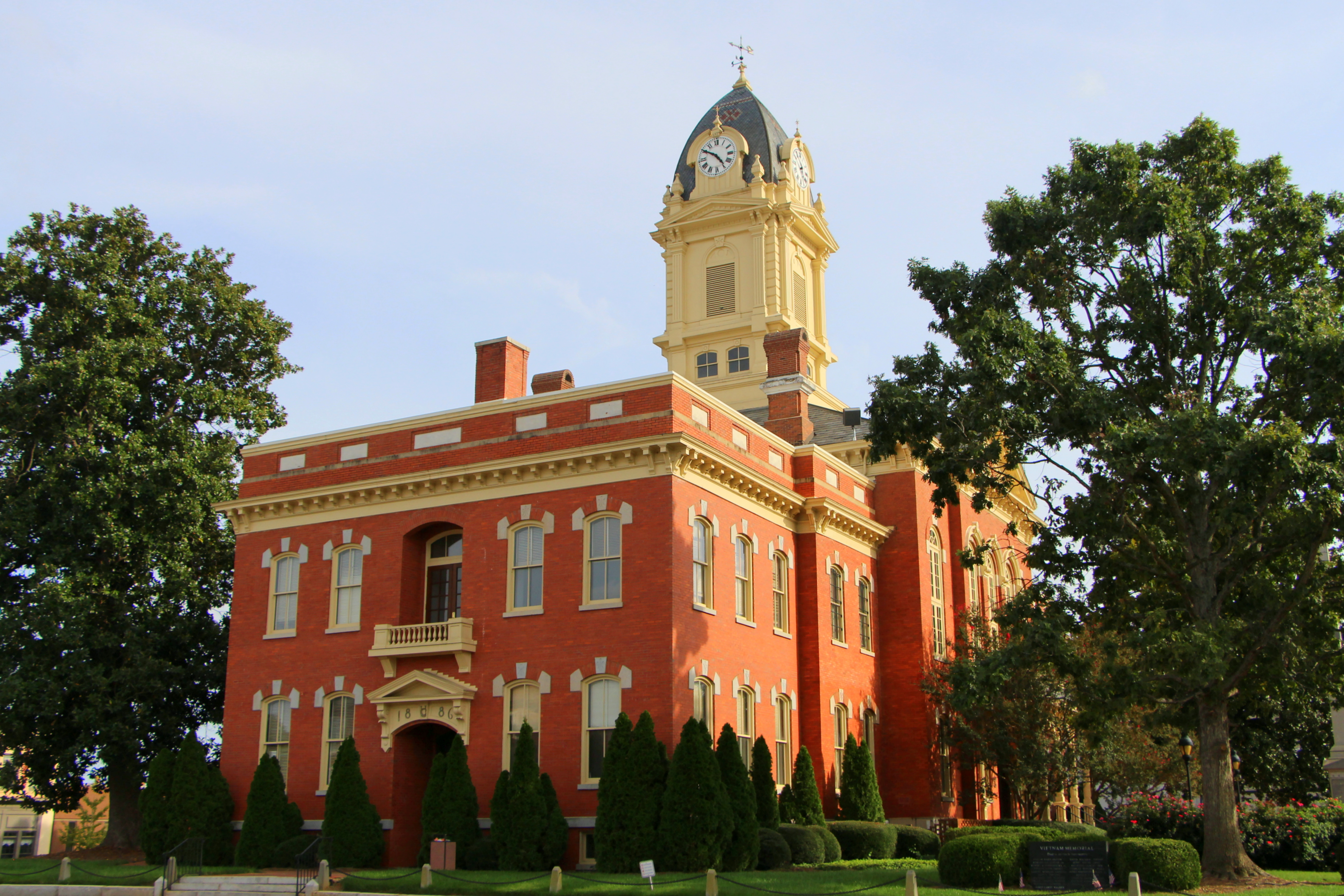
- Union County Courthouse in Monroe

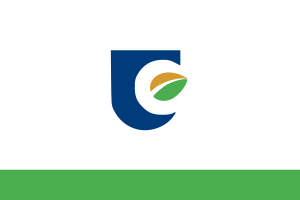
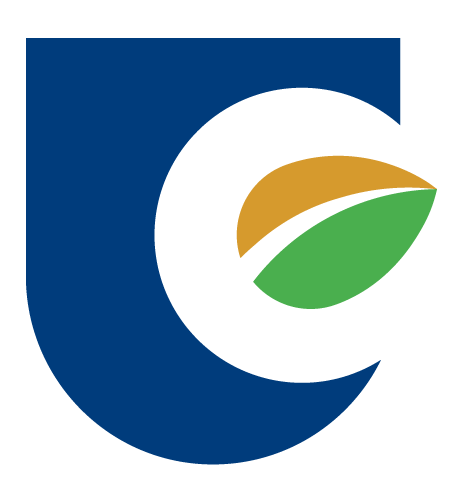
- Flag Seal Logo
- Motto: "Plant your future."
- Location within the U.S. state of North Carolina
- Coordinates: 34.99°N 80.53°W
- Country: United States
- State: North Carolina
- Founded: 1842
- Named for: Compromise name that both local Democrats and Whigs agreed on
- Seat: Monroe
- Largest community: Indian Trail

Area
  - Total: 639.65 sq mi (1,656.7 km^{2})
  - Land: 632.74 sq mi (1,638.8 km^{2})
  - Water: 6.91 sq mi (17.9 km^{2}) 1.08%

Population (2020)
  - Total: 238,267
  - Estimate (2025): 267,674 ▲
  - Density: 376.56/sq mi (145.39/km^{2})
- Time zone: UTC−5 (Eastern)
  - Summer (DST): UTC−4 (EDT)
- Congressional districts: 8th
- Website: www.unioncountync.gov

Union County is a county located in the U.S. state of North Carolina. As of the 2020 census, the population was 238,267. Its county seat is Monroe. Union County is included in the Charlotte-Concord-Gastonia, NC-SC Metropolitan Statistical Area.

== History ==
The county was formed in 1842 from parts of Anson County and Mecklenburg County. Its name was a compromise between Whigs, who wanted to name the new county for Henry Clay, and Democrats, who wanted to name it for Andrew Jackson. The Helms, Starnes, McRorie, and Belk families were prominent in the town as well as Monroe and Charlotte. Most of these families came from Goose Creek Township. Eventually, the state would come to acquire a Clay County and a Jackson County, too.

Monroe, the county seat of Union County, also became a focal point during the Civil Rights Movement. In 1958, local NAACP Chapter President Robert F. Williams defended a 9-year-old African American boy who had been kissed by a white girl in an incident known as the Kissing Case. A second African-American boy, aged 7, was also convicted and sentenced to live in a juvenile reformatory until he was 21 for simply witnessing the act. After three months in a detention center, Governor Luther H. Hodges pardoned the boys.

== Geography ==
Interactive map of Union County

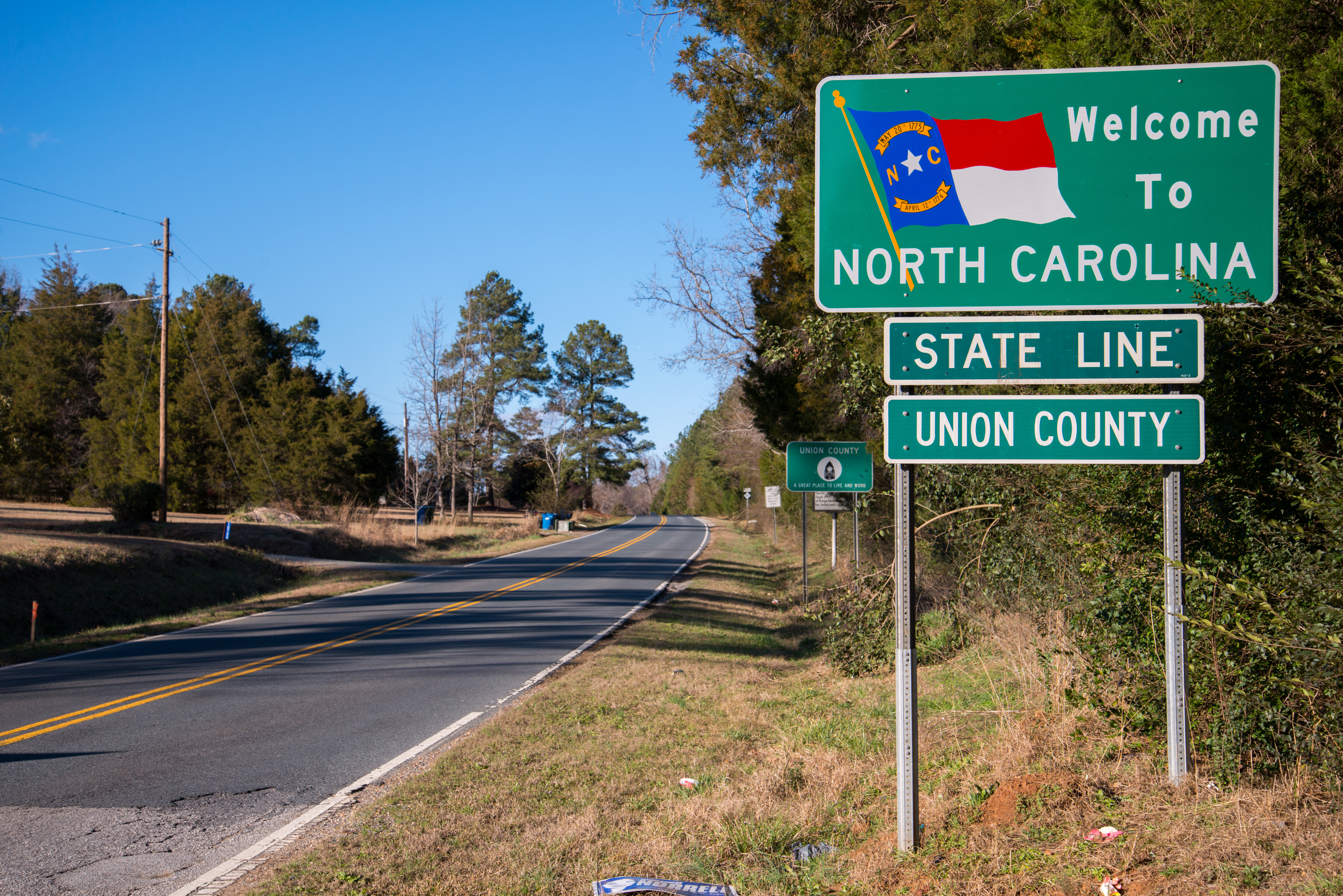
Entering Union County on North Carolina Highway 200

According to the U.S. Census Bureau, the county has a total area of 639.65 square miles (1,656.7 km^{2}), of which 632.74 square miles (1,638.8 km^{2}) is land and 6.91 square miles (17.9 km^{2}) (1.08%) is water.

=== State and local protected areas ===
- Mineral Springs Greenway
- Rocky River Blueway

=== Major water bodies ===
- Beaverdam Creek
- Crooked Creek
- Lake Lee
- Lake Monroe
- Lake Twitty
- Lanes Creek
- Lynches River
- Rocky River

=== Adjacent counties ===
- Cabarrus County – north
- Stanly County – northeast
- Anson County – east
- Chesterfield County, South Carolina – southeast
- Lancaster County, South Carolina – southwest
- Mecklenburg County – northwest

=== Major highways ===
- US 74
- US 74 Byp. (Toll)
- US 601
- NC 16
- NC 75
- NC 84
- NC 200
- NC 205
- NC 207
- NC 218
- NC 522
- NC 742

=== Major infrastructure ===
- Charlotte-Monroe Executive Airport
- Goose Creek Airport
- Jaars-Townsend Airport

== Demographics ==
Historical population
Census	Pop.	Note	%±
1850	10,051		—
1860	11,202		11.5%
1870	12,217		9.1%
1880	18,056		47.8%
1890	21,259		17.7%
1900	27,156		27.7%
1910	33,277		22.5%
1920	36,029		8.3%
1930	40,979		13.7%
1940	39,097		−4.6%
1950	42,034		7.5%
1960	44,670		6.3%
1970	54,714		22.5%
1980	70,380		28.6%
1990	84,211		19.7%
2000	123,677		46.9%
2010	201,292		62.8%
2020	238,267		18.4%
2025 (est.)	267,674	▲	12.3%
U.S. Decennial Census; 1790–1960 1900–1990; 1990–2000 2010–2020

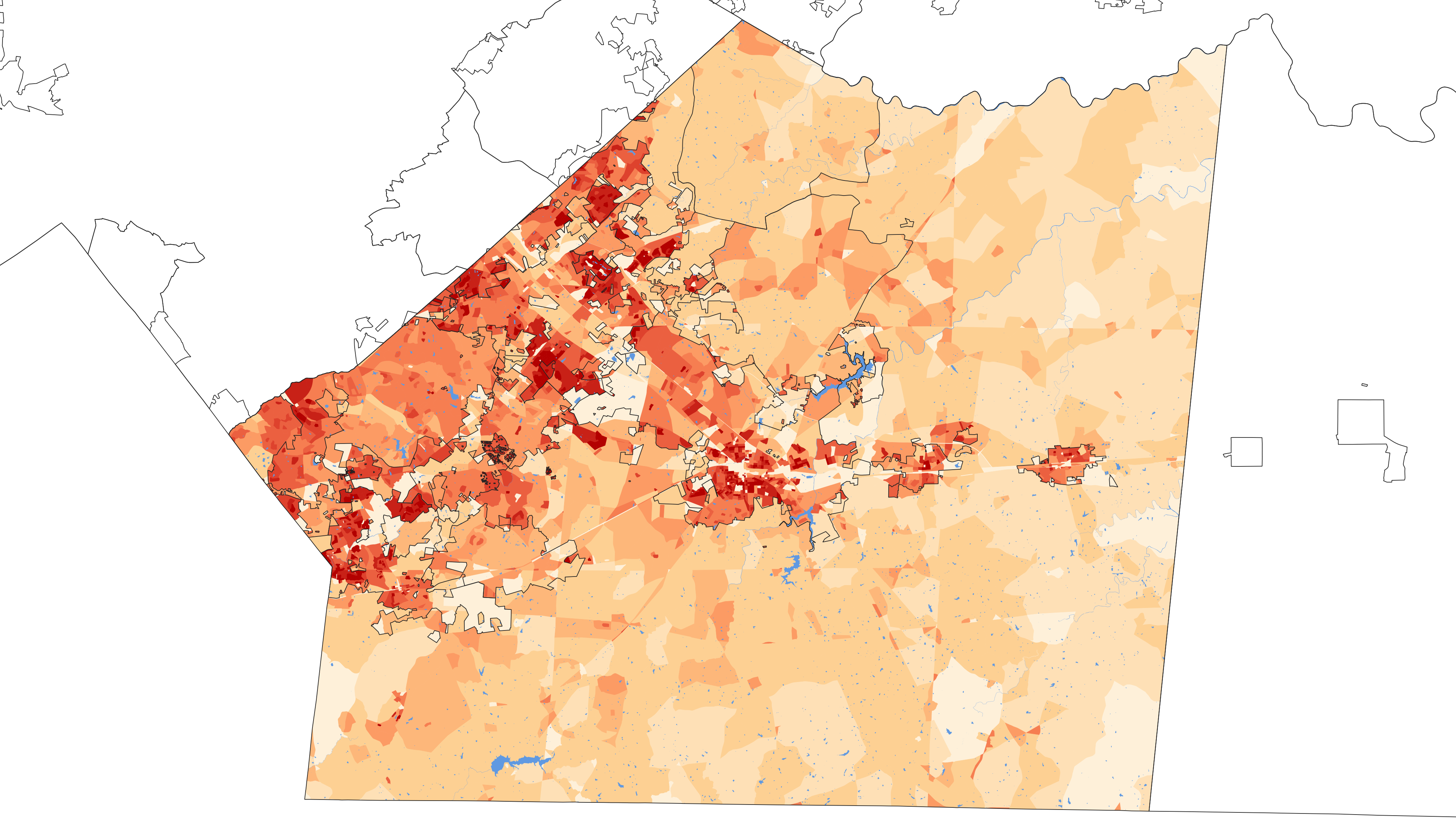
2020 population density of Union County NC by census block

=== 2020 census ===
As of the 2020 census, the county had a population of 238,267 and 62,932 families residing in the county. The median age was 38.9 years, with 27.0% of residents under the age of 18 and 13.3% of residents 65 years of age or older. For every 100 females there were 96.7 males, and for every 100 females age 18 and over there were 93.8 males age 18 and over.

There were 80,167 households in the county, of which 41.9% had children under the age of 18 living in them. Of all households, 63.6% were married-couple households, 12.1% were households with a male householder and no spouse or partner present, and 19.7% were households with a female householder and no spouse or partner present. About 16.8% of all households were made up of individuals and 7.4% had someone living alone who was 65 years of age or older.

There were 83,788 housing units, of which 4.3% were vacant. Among occupied housing units, 81.4% were owner-occupied and 18.6% were renter-occupied. The homeowner vacancy rate was 1.1% and the rental vacancy rate was 6.3%.

The racial makeup of the county was 69.5% White, 11.3% Black or African American, 0.5% American Indian and Alaska Native, 4.0% Asian, 0.1% Native Hawaiian and Pacific Islander, 6.9% from some other race, and 7.8% from two or more races. Hispanic or Latino residents of any race comprised 12.6% of the population.

72.4% of residents lived in urban areas, while 27.6% lived in rural areas.

ce

=== Racial and ethnic composition ===
Union County, North Carolina – Racial and ethnic composition Note: the US Census treats Hispanic/Latino as an ethnic category. This table excludes Latinos from the racial categories and assigns them to a separate category. Hispanics/Latinos may be of any race.
Race / Ethnicity (NH = Non-Hispanic)	Pop 1980	Pop 1990	Pop 2000	Pop 2010	Pop 2020	% 1980	% 1990	% 2000	% 2010	% 2020
White alone (NH)	57,822	69,624	98,612	150,098	161,113	82.16%	82.68%	79.73%	74.57%	67.62%
Black or African American alone (NH)	11,612	13,358	15,312	23,134	26,500	16.50%	15.86%	12.38%	11.49%	11.12%
Native American or Alaska Native alone (NH)	177	290	415	605	641	0.25%	0.34%	0.34%	0.30%	0.27%
Asian alone (NH)	160	252	705	3,243	9,516	0.23%	0.30%	0.57%	1.61%	3.99%
Native Hawaiian or Pacific Islander alone (NH)	x	x	26	58	90	x	x	0.02%	0.03%	0.04%
Other race alone (NH)	48	12	85	415	1,199	0.07%	0.01%	0.07%	0.21%	0.50%
Mixed race or Multiracial (NH)	x	x	885	2,772	9,098	x	x	0.72%	1.38%	3.82%
Hispanic or Latino (any race)	561	675	7,637	20,967	30,110	0.80%	0.80%	6.17%	10.42%	12.64%
Total	70,380	84,211	123,677	201,292	238,267	100.00%	100.00%	100.00%	100.00%	100.00%

=== 2010 census ===
At the 2010 census, there were 201,292 people, 67,864 households, and 54,019 families residing in the county. The population density was 194 people per square mile (75 people/km^{2}). There were 45,695 housing units at an average density of 31.4 units per square mile (12.1 units/km^{2}). The racial makeup of the county was 79.0% White, 11.7% Black or African American, 0.4% Native American, 1.6% Asian, 0.03% Pacific Islander, 5.3% from other races, and 1.9% from two or more races. 10.4% of the population were Hispanic or Latino of any race.

There were 67,864 households, out of which 42.1% had children under the age of 18 living with them, 64.60% were married couples living together, and 10.70% had a female householder with no husband present. 6.10% had someone living alone who was 65 years of age or older. The average household size was 2.94 and the average family size was 3.3.

In the county, the population was spread out, with 32.90% under the age of 20, 4.7% from 20 to 24, 27.7% from 25 to 44, 25.2% from 45 to 64, and 9.6% who were 65 years of age or older. The median age was 36.2 years. The population was 49.4% male. Northern Union County has the southern foothills of the Uwharrie Mountains

== Government and politics ==
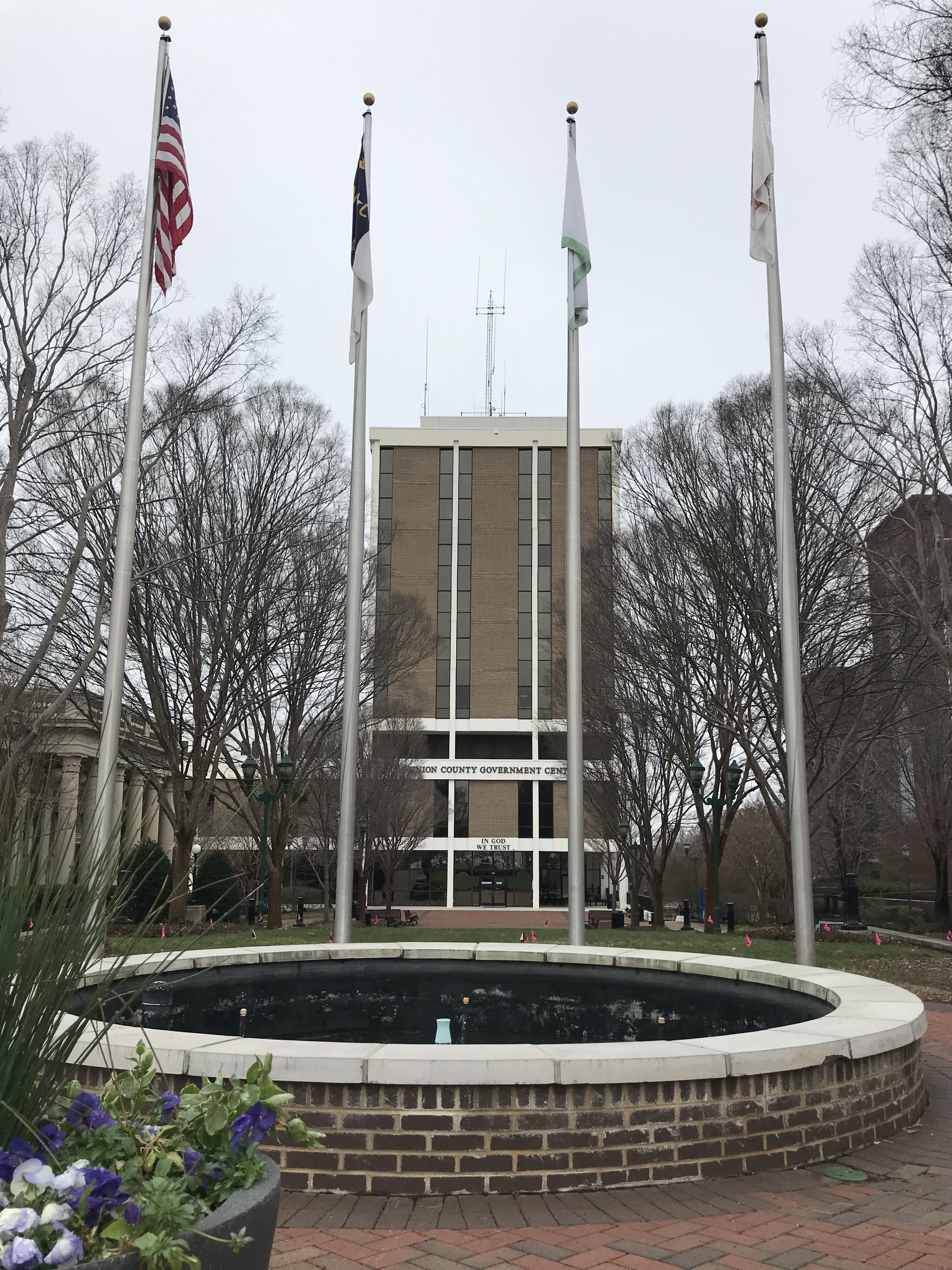
Union County Government Center in Monroe

United States presidential election results for Union County, North Carolina
Year	Republican		Democratic		Third party(ies)	
Year	No.	%	No.	%	No.	%
1880	824	35.21%	1,516	64.79%	0	0.00%
1884	627	25.35%	1,846	74.65%	0	0.00%
1888	879	29.68%	2,067	69.78%	16	0.54%
1892	572	17.88%	1,798	56.19%	830	25.94%
1896	1,009	26.70%	2,747	72.69%	23	0.61%
1900	864	32.29%	1,790	66.89%	22	0.82%
1904	379	23.99%	1,181	74.75%	20	1.27%
1908	834	29.13%	2,029	70.87%	0	0.00%
1912	92	3.91%	1,786	75.87%	476	20.22%
1916	702	20.84%	2,662	79.04%	4	0.12%
1920	1,404	25.20%	4,168	74.80%	0	0.00%
1924	672	19.62%	2,721	79.45%	32	0.93%
1928	2,448	46.29%	2,840	53.71%	0	0.00%
1932	710	10.33%	6,103	88.84%	57	0.83%
1936	601	7.44%	7,480	92.56%	0	0.00%
1940	634	8.11%	7,179	91.89%	0	0.00%
1944	1,114	16.28%	5,729	83.72%	0	0.00%
1948	738	14.35%	3,407	66.23%	999	19.42%
1952	3,790	33.82%	7,416	66.18%	0	0.00%
1956	3,362	34.50%	6,383	65.50%	0	0.00%
1960	4,030	35.28%	7,393	64.72%	0	0.00%
1964	4,229	36.98%	7,208	63.02%	0	0.00%
1968	5,290	38.67%	3,630	26.53%	4,761	34.80%
1972	10,264	71.60%	3,886	27.11%	186	1.30%
1976	6,184	36.72%	10,578	62.81%	78	0.46%
1980	9,012	45.77%	10,073	51.16%	603	3.06%
1984	16,885	70.45%	7,048	29.41%	35	0.15%
1988	17,015	65.71%	8,820	34.06%	61	0.24%
1992	16,542	51.71%	10,789	33.72%	4,661	14.57%
1996	18,802	57.03%	11,525	34.96%	2,643	8.02%
2000	31,876	67.59%	14,890	31.57%	395	0.84%
2004	42,820	70.20%	17,974	29.47%	207	0.34%
2008	54,123	62.87%	31,189	36.23%	777	0.90%
2012	61,107	64.51%	32,473	34.28%	1,148	1.21%
2016	66,707	63.10%	34,337	32.48%	4,666	4.41%
2020	80,382	61.36%	48,725	37.19%	1,904	1.45%
2024	86,271	61.91%	51,168	36.72%	1,916	1.37%

In the early through mid-20th century, Union County was a firm "Solid South" Democratic county. Union County remained traditionally "Solid South" until after the civil rights movement. The first Republican to win the county was Richard Nixon with less than 40 percent of the vote in a three-way race in 1968. Union County has followed much of the South in turning towards the Republican Party following Nixon's election. Native Southerner Jimmy Carter carried Union County twice, but he remains the last Democrat to carry the county, and no Democrat since 1980 has reached 40 percent of the county's vote.

Union County is a member of the regional Centralina Council of Governments.

== Education ==
- South Piedmont Community College
- Central Academy of Technology and Arts
- Cuthbertson High School
- Forest Hills High School
- Marvin Ridge High School
- Metrolina Christian Academy
- Monroe Charter Academy
- Monroe High School
- Parkwood High School
- Piedmont High School
- Porter Ridge High School
- Sun Valley High School
- Arborbrook Christian Academy
- Tabernacle Christian School
- Union County Early College
- Union Academy
- Weddington High School
- Wingate University
- Shiloh Elementary

== Events ==
Two major annual events occur in the county:

- Brooklandwood in Mineral Springs is the site of the Queens Cup Steeplechase, one of steeplechase horse racing's major annual events. The program consists of several races, and is held the last Saturday of April. The schedule of events also features a Jack Russell Terrier judging contest. Over 10,000 people typically attend the event.
- The Union County town of Marshville is the site of the Randy Travis Festival, an annual street fair and carnival that takes place every fall.

== Communities ==
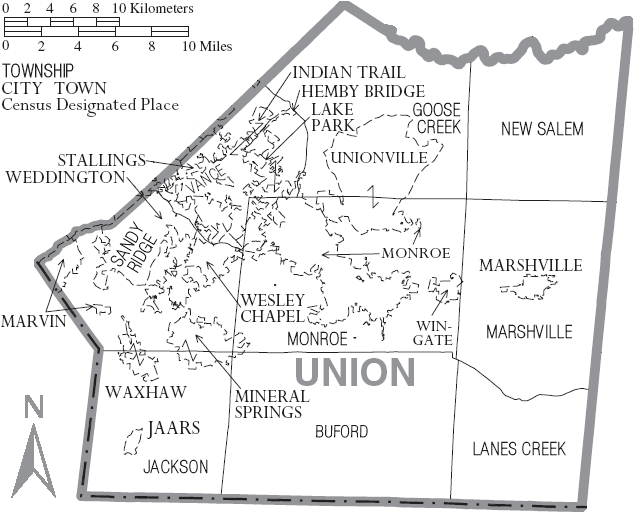
Map of Union County with municipal and township labels

=== City ===
- Monroe (county seat)

=== Towns ===
- Fairview
- Hemby Bridge
- Indian Trail (largest community)
- Marshville
- Mineral Springs
- Stallings
- Unionville
- Waxhaw
- Weddington
- Wingate

=== Villages ===
- Lake Park
- Marvin
- Wesley Chapel

=== Townships ===
- Goose Creek
- Jackson
- Marshville
- Monroe
- New Salem
- Vance
- Buford
- Lanes Creek
- Sandy Ridge

=== Census-designated place ===
- JAARS

=== Unincorporated communities ===
- Brief
- Jackson
- New Salem
- Olive Branch
- Roughedge

== See also ==
- List of counties in North Carolina
- National Register of Historic Places listings in Union County, North Carolina
- Brandon Oaks, North Carolina
