= Hemby Bridge, North Carolina =

- Town
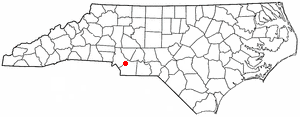
- Location of HembyBridge, North Carolina
- Coordinates: 35°07′12″N 80°36′28″W
- Country: United States
- State: North Carolina
- County: Union
- Incorporated: 1998
- Named for: A bridge, that spanned Crooked Creek, owned by Dawson Hemby

Government
  - Type: Mayor–council
  - Mayor: Kevin Pressley

Area
  - Total: 2.33 sq mi (6.04 km^{2})
  - Land: 2.29 sq mi (5.93 km^{2})
  - Water: 0.042 sq mi (0.11 km^{2})
- Elevation: 614 ft (187 m)

Population (2020)
  - Total: 1,614
  - Density: 704.4/sq mi (271.96/km^{2})
- Time zone: UTC-5 (Eastern (EST))
  - Summer (DST): UTC-4 (EDT)
- ZIP code: 28079
- Area code: 704
- FIPS code: 37-30620
- GNIS feature ID: 2405815
- Website: http://www.hembybridgenc.govoffice2.com/

Hemby Bridge is a town in Union County, North Carolina, United States. The population was 1,615 at the 2020 census.

== Geography ==
According to the United States Census Bureau, the town has a total area of 1.4 square miles (3.6 km^{2}), all land.

== Demographics ==
Historical population
Census	Pop.	Note	%±
2000	897		—
2010	1,520		69.5%
2020	1,614		6.2%
2021 (est.)	1,649	▲	2.2%
U.S. Decennial Census

=== 2020 census ===
Hemby Bridge racial composition
Race	Number	Percentage
White (non-Hispanic)	1,225	75.9%
Black or African American (non-Hispanic)	108	6.69%
Native American	6	0.37%
Asian	36	2.23%
Other/Mixed	83	5.14%
Hispanic or Latino	156	9.67%

As of the 2020 United States census, there were 1,615 people, 618 households, and 492 families residing in the town.

=== 2000 census ===
There were 341 households, out of which 31.7% had children under the age of 18 living with them, 69.2% were married couples living together, 7.6% had a female householder with no husband present, and 19.6% were non-families. 15.2% of all households were made up of individuals, and 4.1% had someone living alone who was 65 years of age or older. The average household size was 2.63 and the average family size was 2.91. Hispanics or Latinos of any race were 0.33% of the population.

In the town, the population was spread out, with 22.4% under the age of 18, 5.9% from 18 to 24, 35.2% from 25 to 44, 25.5% from 45 to 64, and 10.9% who were 65 years of age or older. The median age was 37 years. For every 100 females, there were 102.5 males. For every 100 females age 18 and over, there were 101.2 males.

The median income for a household in the town was $52,813, and the median income for a family was $50,000. Males had a median income of $32,404 versus $24,342 for females. The per capita income for the town was $28,046. About 10.6% of families and 8.4% of the population were below the poverty line, including 7.8% of those under age 18 and 19.9% of those age 65 or over.
