= Lake Park, North Carolina =

- Village
- Seal
- Motto: "A Community For All Seasons"
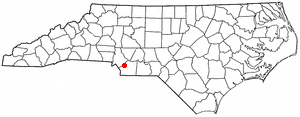
- Location of Lake Park, North Carolina
- Coordinates: 35°05′06″N 80°38′05″W
- Country: United States
- State: North Carolina
- County: Union
- Incorporated: 1993

Area
  - Total: 0.76 sq mi (1.97 km^{2})
  - Land: 0.73 sq mi (1.90 km^{2})
  - Water: 0.027 sq mi (0.07 km^{2})
- Elevation: 663 ft (202 m)

Population (2020)
  - Total: 3,269
  - Density: 4,448.2/sq mi (1,717.46/km^{2})
- Time zone: UTC-5 (Eastern (EST))
  - Summer (DST): UTC-4 (EDT)
- ZIP code: 28079
- Area codes: 704 and 980
- FIPS code: 37-36512
- GNIS feature ID: 2407488
- Website: lakeparknc.gov

Lake Park is a village in Union County, North Carolina, United States. As of the 2020 census, Lake Park had a population of 3,269.

== Geography ==
According to the United States Census Bureau, the village has a total area of 0.8 square miles (2.1 km^{2}), of which 0.7 square miles (1.8 km^{2}) is land and 0.01 square miles (0.026 km^{2}) is water. Several lakes can clearly be seen when inside city limits, as well as from satellite view.

== Demographics ==
Historical population
Census	Pop.	Note	%±
2000	2,093		—
2010	3,422		63.5%
2020	3,269		−4.5%
U.S. Decennial Census

=== 2020 census ===
As of the 2020 census, Lake Park had a population of 3,269. The median age was 41.8 years. 21.2% of residents were under the age of 18 and 17.2% of residents were 65 years of age or older. For every 100 females there were 84.9 males, and for every 100 females age 18 and over there were 80.3 males age 18 and over.

100.0% of residents lived in urban areas, while 0.0% lived in rural areas.

There were 1,220 households in Lake Park, of which 35.2% had children under the age of 18 living in them. Of all households, 56.6% were married-couple households, 10.1% were households with a male householder and no spouse or partner present, and 28.6% were households with a female householder and no spouse or partner present. About 22.3% of all households were made up of individuals and 11.9% had someone living alone who was 65 years of age or older.

There were 1,254 housing units, of which 2.7% were vacant. The homeowner vacancy rate was 1.2% and the rental vacancy rate was 3.9%.

Racial composition as of the 2020 census
Race	Number	Percent
White	2,575	78.8%
Black or African American	216	6.6%
American Indian and Alaska Native	9	0.3%
Asian	78	2.4%
Native Hawaiian and Other Pacific Islander	0	0.0%
Some other race	91	2.8%
Two or more races	300	9.2%
Hispanic or Latino (of any race)	290	8.9%

=== 2000 census ===
As of the 2000 census, there were 2,093 people, 750 households, and 609 families residing in the village. The population density was 2,630.1 inhabitants per square mile (1,015.5/km^{2}). There were 781 housing units at an average density of 981.4 per square mile (378.9/km^{2}). The racial makeup of the city was 90.83% White, 5.16% African American, 0.53% Native American, 1.39% Asian, 0.14% Pacific Islander, 0.43% from other races, and 1.53% from two or more races. Hispanic or Latino of any race were 2.48% of the population.

There were 750 households, out of which 45.1% had children under the age of 18 living with them, 73.3% were married couples living together, 6.8% had a female householder with no husband present, and 18.7% were non-families. 14.9% of all households were made up of individuals, and 3.5% had someone living alone who was 65 years of age or older. The average household size was 2.79 and the average family size was 3.13.

In the city the population was spread out, with 30.9% under the age of 18, 4.3% from 18 to 24, 41.9% from 25 to 44, 17.1% from 45 to 64, and 5.8% who were 65 years of age or older. The median age was 33 years. For every 100 females, there were 93.3 males. For every 100 females age 18 and over, there were 90.1 males.

The median income for a household in the village was $68,304, and the median income for a family was $71,630. Males had a median income of $47,083 versus $31,848 for females. The per capita income for the village was $25,330. About 1.7% of families and 2.0% of the population were below the poverty line, including 1.8% of those under age 18 and 4.4% of those age 65 or over.

== Government ==
Lake Park is governed by a mayor and five-member Village Council. As of 2026, Jeremy Russell serves as mayor and Joe Scaldara serves as mayor pro tempore. The other members of the Village Council are Bruce Barton, Jim Record, Mark Richards, and Wayne Rentsch.

The terms of Russell, Scaldara, Barton, and Record expire in 2027. The terms of Richards and Rentsch expire in 2029.

=== Assault conviction of council member ===
In April 2026, Lake Park council member Mark Richards was convicted of assault on a female stemming from a December 2025 incident involving a contracted employee of the Village of Lake Park. According to court records reported by WBTV and WSOC-TV, Richards grabbed the woman's arm and pushed her.

Richards was sentenced to 30 days in jail, with the sentence suspended, and placed on 12 months of unsupervised probation. He was also ordered to pay a $203 fine and have no contact with the victim.

WBTV subsequently obtained an audio recording of the incident that had been used in court. The station reported that the recording captured an argument between Richards and the contracted Village employee and was used as evidence in his conviction.
