= JAARS, North Carolina =

- CDP
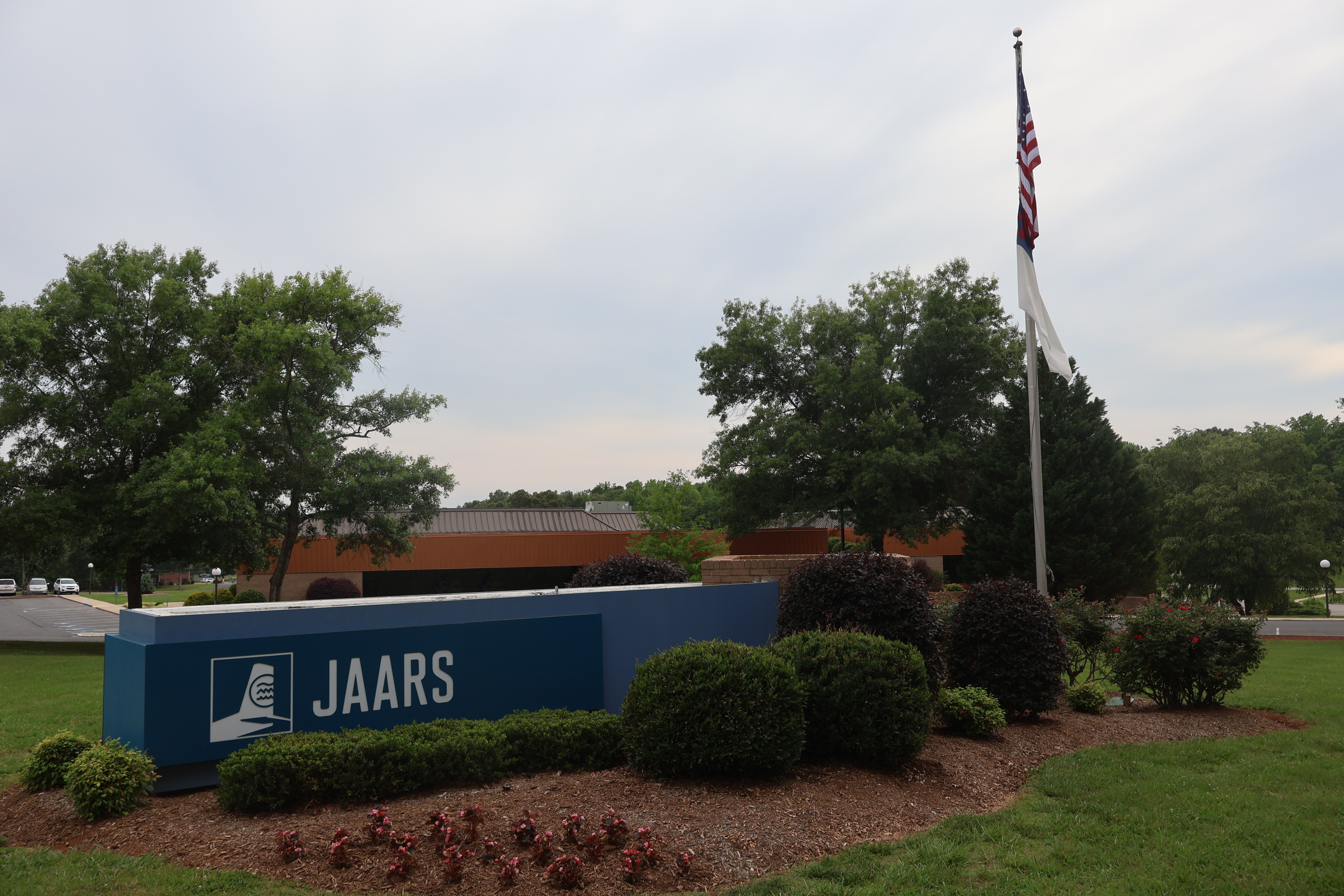
- The entrance to JAARS, North Carolina
- Interactive map of JAARS, North Carolina
- Location within North Carolina
- Coordinates: 34.8645°N 80.7503°W
- Country: United States
- State: North Carolina
- County: Union

Area
  - Total: 0.863 sq mi (2.235 km^{2})
  - Land: 0.859 sq mi (2.226 km^{2})
  - Water: 0.0039 sq mi (0.010 km^{2}) 0.46%
- Elevation: 581 ft (177 m)

Population (2020)
  - Total: 471
  - Estimate (2025): 795
  - Density: 548/sq mi (212/km^{2})
- Time zone: UTC–5 (Eastern (EST))
  - Summer (DST): UTC–4 (EDT)
- ZIP Code: 28173
- Area codes: 704 and 980
- FIPS code: 37-33993
- GNIS feature ID: 2402628

Jaars, capitalized as JAARS on some maps, is a census-designated place (CDP) in Union County, North Carolina, United States. The population was 471 as of the 2020 census, and was estimated at 795 in 2025. The region's name comes from JAARS, a non-profit organization that is located there.

== Geography ==
According to the United States Census Bureau, the CDP has an area of 0.863 square miles (2.24 km^{2}), of which 0.859 square miles (2.22 km^{2}) is land and 0.004 square miles (0.01 km^{2}) (0.46%) is water.

== Demographics ==
Historical population
Census	Pop.	Note	%±
2000	360		—
2010	597		65.8%
2020	471		−21.1%
2025 (est.)	795		68.8%
U.S. Decennial Census; 2020 Census

According to realtor website Zillow, the average price of a home as of August 31, 2026, in JAARS was $371,862.

As of the 2024 American Community Survey, there were 153 estimated households in JAARS with an average of 4.42 persons per household. The CDP has a median household income of $65,777. Approximately 27.8% of the CDP's population lives at or below the poverty line. JAARS has an estimated 31.8% employment rate, with 40.6% of the population holding a bachelor's degree or higher and 76.6% holding a high school diploma. There were 222 housing units at an average density of 258.44 per square mile (99.78/km^{2}).

The top five reported languages (people were allowed to report up to two languages, thus the figures will generally add to more than 100%) were English (89.7%), Spanish (0.0%), Indo-European (10.3%), Asian and Pacific Islander (0.0%), and Other (0.0%).

The median age in the CDP was 33.0 years.

JAARS, North Carolina – racial and ethnic composition Note: the US Census treats Hispanic/Latino as an ethnic category. This table excludes Latinos from the racial categories and assigns them to a separate category. Hispanics/Latinos may be of any race.
Race / ethnicity (NH = non-Hispanic)	Pop. 2000	Pop. 2010	Pop. 2020	% 2000	% 2010	% 2020
White alone (NH)	350	574	363	97.22%	96.15%	77.07%
Black or African American alone (NH)	0	9	18	0.00%	1.51%	3.82%
Native American or Alaska Native alone (NH)	0	0	3	0.00%	0.00%	0.64%
Asian alone (NH)	1	1	7	0.28%	0.17%	1.49%
Pacific Islander alone (NH)	0	2	0	0.00%	0.34%	0.00%
Other race alone (NH)	0	2	2	0.00%	0.34%	0.42%
Mixed race or multiracial (NH)	1	2	35	0.28%	0.34%	7.43%
Hispanic or Latino (any race)	8	7	43	2.22%	1.17%	9.13%
Total	360	597	471	100.00%	100.00%	100.00%

=== 2020 census ===
As of the 2020 census, there were 471 people, 164 households, and 124 families residing in the CDP. The population density was 548.31 inhabitants per square mile (211.70/km^{2}). There were 211 housing units at an average density of 245.63 per square mile (94.84/km^{2}). The racial makeup of the CDP was 77.92% White, 3.82% African American, 1.70% Native American, 1.49% Asian, 0.00% Pacific Islander, 2.34% from some other races and 12.74% from two or more races. Hispanic or Latino people of any race were 9.13% of the population.

=== 2010 census ===
As of the 2010 census, there were 597 people, 153 households, and 124 families residing in the CDP. The population density was 694.99 inhabitants per square mile (268.34/km^{2}). There were 177 housing units at an average density of 206.05 per square mile (79.56/km^{2}). The racial makeup of the CDP was 97.15% White, 1.51% African American, 0.00% Native American, 0.17% Asian, 0.34% Pacific Islander, 0.50% from some other races and 0.34% from two or more races. Hispanic or Latino people of any race were 1.17% of the population.

=== 2000 census ===
As of the 2000 census, there were 360 people, 126 households, and 100 families residing in the CDP. The population density was 424.68 inhabitants per square mile (163.97/km^{2}). There were 173 housing units at an average density of 204.08 per square mile (78.80/km^{2}). The racial makeup of the CDP was 97.50% White, 0.00% African American, 0.00% Native American, 0.28% Asian, 0.00% Pacific Islander, 1.94% from some other races and 0.28% from two or more races. Hispanic or Latino people of any race were 2.22% of the population.

There were 126 households, out of which 29.4% had children under the age of 18 living with them, 73.0% were married couples living together, 6.3% had a female householder with no husband present, and 20.6% were non-families. 17.5% of all households were made up of individuals, and 11.9% had someone living alone who was 65 years of age or older. The average household size was 2.86 and the average family size was 3.23.

In the CDP, the population was spread out, with 27.5% under the age of 18, 5.6% from 18 to 24, 18.3% from 25 to 44, 21.7% from 45 to 64, and 26.9% who were 65 years of age or older. The median age was 44 years. For every 100 females, there were 87.5 males. For every 100 females age 18 and over, there were 86.4 males.

The median income for a household in the CDP was $51,591, and the median income for a family was $51,250. Males had a median income of $35,278 versus $53,750 for females. The per capita income for the CDP was $18,433. About 11.5% of families and 10.3% of the population were below the poverty line, including none of those under age 18 and 55.1% of those age 65 or over.

== See also ==
- JAARS, the CDP's namesake
