= Marvin, North Carolina =

- Village
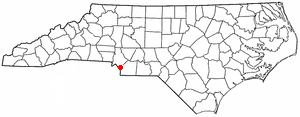
- Location of Marvin, North Carolina
- Coordinates: 34°59′30.53″N 80°48′53.26″W
- Country: United States
- State: North Carolina
- County: Union
- Incorporated: July 1, 1994

Area
  - Total: 6.03 sq mi (15.63 km^{2})
  - Land: 5.98 sq mi (15.50 km^{2})
  - Water: 0.046 sq mi (0.12 km^{2})
- Elevation: 646 ft (197 m)

Population (2020)
  - Total: 6,358
  - Density: 1,062.1/sq mi (410.09/km^{2})
- Time zone: UTC-5 (Eastern (EST))
  - Summer (DST): UTC-4 (EDT)
- ZIP code: 28173
- Area code: 704
- FIPS code: 37-41720
- GNIS feature ID: 2407497
- Website: https://marvinnc.gov/

Marvin is a village in Union County, North Carolina, United States. As of the 2020 census, Marvin had a population of 6,358. It is a more rural suburb of Charlotte.

== Geography ==
According to the United States Census Bureau, the village has a total area of 3.9 square miles (10 km^{2}), of which 3.9 square miles (10 km^{2}) is land and 0.04 square miles (0.10 km^{2}) (0.51%) is water. Marvin is a border territory, which lies in the state of North Carolina but borders South Carolina to the southwest.

== Demographics ==
Historical population
Census	Pop.	Note	%±
2000	1,039		—
2010	5,579		437.0%
2020	6,358		14.0%
2025 (est.)	7,040	▲	10.7%
U.S. Decennial Census

=== 2020 census ===
As of the 2020 census, Marvin had a population of 6,358. The median age was 41.7 years. 31.9% of residents were under the age of 18 and 9.7% of residents were 65 years of age or older. For every 100 females there were 100.6 males, and for every 100 females age 18 and over there were 96.9 males age 18 and over.

96.3% of residents lived in urban areas, while 3.7% lived in rural areas.

There were 1,843 households in Marvin, of which 57.8% had children under the age of 18 living in them. Of all households, 87.2% were married-couple households, 4.8% were households with a male householder and no spouse or partner present, and 6.9% were households with a female householder and no spouse or partner present. About 4.8% of all households were made up of individuals and 2.3% had someone living alone who was 65 years of age or older.

There were 1,888 housing units, of which 2.4% were vacant. The homeowner vacancy rate was 0.8% and the rental vacancy rate was 0.0%.

Racial composition as of the 2020 census
Race	Number	Percent
White	4,570	71.9%
Black or African American	337	5.3%
American Indian and Alaska Native	19	0.3%
Asian	964	15.2%
Native Hawaiian and Other Pacific Islander	5	0.1%
Some other race	52	0.8%
Two or more races	411	6.5%
Hispanic or Latino (of any race)	314	4.9%

=== 2010 census ===
As of the census of 2010, there were 5,579 people, 1,553 households, and 1,463 families residing in the village. The population density was 1,429 inhabitants per square mile (552/km^{2}). There were 1506 housing units at an average density of 386 per square mile (149/km^{2}). The racial makeup of the village was 86.2% White, 5.7% African American, 5.4% Asian, and 1.6% from two or more races. Hispanic or Latino of any race were 3.3% of the population.

There were 1553 households, out of which 67.7% had children under the age of 18 living with them, 89.4% were married couples living together, 2.3% had a female householder with no husband present, and 5.8% were non-families. 4.8% of all households were made up of individuals, and 1.7% had someone living alone who was 65 years of age or older. The average household size was 3.59 and the average family size was 3.73.

In the village, the population was spread out, with 33.6% under the age of 18, 3.4% from 18 to 24, 33.8% from 25 to 44, 24.2% from 45 to 64, and 5.1% who were 65 years of age or older. The median age was 37 years. For every 100 females, there were 102.5 males. For every 100 females age 18 and over, there were 97.1 males.

The median income for a household in the village was $157,297, and the median income for a family was $158,537. Males had a median income of $127,159 versus $51,053 for females. The per capita income for the village was $57,822. About 1.6% of families and 1.6% of the population were below the poverty line, including 2.2% of those under age 18 and 0% of those age 65 or over.

The Village enacted a new land use plan in 2004, to establish its desire to preserve its open spaces firmly, and low-density character. Marvin is located near Ballantyne, South Charlotte.

In April 2022, the village opened a village hall near Marvin Elementary School.

== History ==
The area known as Marvin today was settled and inhabited by elements of the Waxhaw Indian tribe, who lived near the present day border between North Carolina and South Carolina. The Waxhaw gained their name from the type of waxy reed which grew near the swamps of the Waxhaw forests.

On October 30, 1629, King Charles I of England granted the establishment of the Colony of Carolina under the governance of Sir Robert Heath. This sparked the development of the Carolina colonies which resulted in several explorations down the Great Trading Path which ran from Augusta through Charlotte and towards Petersburg, Virginia.

In 1700, John Lawson, Surveyor-General of the Colony of North Carolina made first contact with the Waxhaw Indians, and the native land of Marvin. He noted that "the land was being so fertile that no labor of man in one or two ages could make it poor." Lawsons thoughts about the land were confirmed 300 years later with numerous farms scattered around the Marvin area, giving its semi-rural suburban atmosphere. In 1741, an epidemic of smallpox was introduced into the community, and many of the Indians were killed or were forced to abandon the area. Settlers began to exploit the fertile land to grow crops such as soy and tobacco.

German, English, Welch, and Scottish families, some of whom were escaping turmoil in Europe such as the 7 years war and the Jacobite rising of 1745.

Until 1842, Marvin was an unincorporated section of Anson county, until the schism between Mecklenburg - Anson counties, which resulted in the creation of Union county, and thus the incorporation of Marvin. Most settlers of Marvin owned slaves and would pass inheritance to their children. It would not be until the end of the Civil War that slavery was ended in Marvin. Most local slaves were purchased in Charleston, SC. Old Steel Creek road was used as a transport of slaved cotton, which was destroyed by General Cornwallis during the American Revolutionary war, and currently is the site of Highway 521.

Although sources are scarce, it is believed that Henry Downs was one of the original signatories of the "Mecklenburg Declaration of Independence", which was destroyed in a fire in 1800, and published just one month after the events at Lexington and Concord.

In 1777, North Carolina began issuing land grants to those who served in the American revolution. Around 640 acres of land were distributed through this land grant system. It is believed that the Crane road was where Francis Carter, one of the first settlers of the Marvin area, lived and managed the distribution of crown grants. A few of the oldest families in the Carolinas held kings’ grants from those distributed by Francis Carter, but most had come down the Great Trading Path from the North, such as the Polk family, and President James K. Polk, along with the Jackson family, and President Andrew Jackson, born near Marvin.

Maggie Ross, one of the richest women in Union County had a scandal regarding the distribution between her will and her family members. After her sister, Sallie Ross, died in 1909, her estate was bequeathed to Bob Ross, who were African American. This sparked one of the largest civil rights feuds in the county due to racial prejudice in the local Union county municipal courts. Later, this racial tension would culminate in the Kissing Case, taking place in Monroe.

Marvin was founded on July 1, 1994. According to Ruth B. Ezzell, the major Marvin principles for foundation were "the hardships, the sacrifices made by our forefathers, their determination to lay principles as foundations for future generations, how they fought in wars for freedom and liberty, we may be inspired to a greater loyalty and appreciation of our community".

Marvin has experienced numerous demographic changes, such as an increase of Asian-Americans who have migrated to the town during the early 2000's. Marvin is geographically located near Charlotte, and is incorporated as an official suburb of Charlotte, and the major shift in population can be attributed towards the large banking Industry of Charlotte, NC, which has grown due to the introduction of Bank of America which was finalized around 1992.
