= Fairview, Union County, North Carolina =

Fairview, North Carolina
- Town
- Interactive map of Fairview, North Carolina
- Coordinates: 35°09′16″N 80°32′04″W
- Country: United States
- State: North Carolina
- County: Union
- Incorporated: 2001

Area
  - Total: 30.32 sq mi (78.53 km^{2})
  - Land: 29.98 sq mi (77.66 km^{2})
  - Water: 0.34 sq mi (0.87 km^{2})
- Elevation: 482 ft (147 m)

Population (2020)
  - Total: 3,456
  - Density: 115/sq mi (44.5/km^{2})
- Time zone: UTC-5 (Eastern (EST))
  - Summer (DST): UTC-4 (EDT)
- ZIP code: 28110
- Area code: 704 980
- FIPS code: 37-22500
- GNIS feature ID: 2406481
- Website: www.fairviewnc.gov

Fairview is a town in Union County, North Carolina, United States. The town incorporated in 2001. The population was 3,463 at the 2020 census. Fairview has one elementary school, one service station, a volunteer fire department, a small chain dollar store, and a community park.

== Demographics ==
Historical population
Census	Pop.	Note	%±
1990	1,830		—
2000	2,495		36.3%
2010	3,324		33.2%
2020	3,463		4.2%
2021 (est.)	3,540		2.2%
U.S. Decennial Census

=== 2020 census ===
Fairview racial composition
Race	Number	Percentage
White (non-Hispanic)	3,150	91.15%
Black or African American (non-Hispanic)	51	1.48%
Native American	6	0.17%
Asian	25	0.72%
Other/Mixed	93	2.69%
Hispanic or Latino	131	3.79%

As of the 2020 United States census, there were 3,463 people, 1,451 households, and 1,046 families residing in the town.

== Geography ==
Fairview is located in the foothills of the Uwharrie Mountains. Tyler Knob is the highest point at 849 feet at its peak, sitting on the Fairview-Unionville town line. The Rocky River runs through Fairview along the higher foothills of the Uwharrie Mountains.
