= Mineral Springs, North Carolina =

- Town
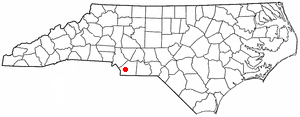
- Location of Mineral Springs, North Carolina
- Coordinates: 34°56′28″N 80°41′05″W
- Country: United States
- State: North Carolina
- County: Union
- Incorporated: March 4, 1905, August 10, 1999

Area
  - Total: 8.28 sq mi (21.44 km^{2})
  - Land: 8.21 sq mi (21.26 km^{2})
  - Water: 0.069 sq mi (0.18 km^{2})
- Elevation: 650 ft (200 m)

Population (2020)
  - Total: 3,159
  - Density: 384.8/sq mi (148.56/km^{2})
- Time zone: UTC-5 (Eastern (EST))
  - Summer (DST): UTC-4 (EDT)
- ZIP code: 28108
- Area code: 704
- FIPS code: 37-43360
- GNIS feature ID: 2406168
- Website: www.mineralspringsnc.com

Mineral Springs is a town in Union County, North Carolina, United States. The population was 3,159 at the 2020 census.

== Geography ==
According to the United States Census Bureau, the town has a total area of 8.28 square miles (21.4 km^{2}), of which 8.21 square miles (21.3 km^{2}) is land and 0.07 square miles (0.18 km^{2}) is water.

== Demographics ==
Historical population
| Census | Pop. | Note | %± |
|---|---|---|---|
| 1920 | 84 | | — |
| 1930 | 114 | | 35.7% |
| 2000 | 1,370 | | — |
| 2010 | 2,639 | | 92.6% |
| 2020 | 3,159 | | 19.7% |
U.S. Decennial Census

=== 2020 census ===
As of the 2020 census, Mineral Springs had a population of 3,159. The median age was 42.7 years. 24.5% of residents were under the age of 18 and 16.4% of residents were 65 years of age or older. For every 100 females there were 99.1 males, and for every 100 females age 18 and over there were 99.1 males age 18 and over.

42.4% of residents lived in urban areas, while 57.6% lived in rural areas.

There were 1,135 households in Mineral Springs, of which 34.4% had children under the age of 18 living in them. Of all households, 65.4% were married-couple households, 12.4% were households with a male householder and no spouse or partner present, and 17.6% were households with a female householder and no spouse or partner present. About 14.5% of all households were made up of individuals and 6.7% had someone living alone who was 65 years of age or older.

There were 1,166 housing units, of which 2.7% were vacant. The homeowner vacancy rate was 0.4% and the rental vacancy rate was 5.3%.

Racial composition as of the 2020 census
| Race | Number | Percent |
|---|---|---|
| White | 2,425 | 76.8% |
| Black or African American | 343 | 10.9% |
| American Indian and Alaska Native | 10 | 0.3% |
| Asian | 48 | 1.5% |
| Native Hawaiian and Other Pacific Islander | 2 | 0.1% |
| Some other race | 73 | 2.3% |
| Two or more races | 258 | 8.2% |
| Hispanic or Latino (of any race) | 206 | 6.5% |

=== 2000 census ===
As of the census of 2000, there were 1,370 people, 475 households, and 387 families residing in the town. The population density was 181.2 inhabitants per square mile (70.0/km^{2}). There were 491 housing units at an average density of 64.9 per square mile (25.1/km^{2}). The racial makeup of the town was 79.93% White, 17.88% African American, 0.15% Native American, 0.22% Asian, 0.88% from other races, and 0.95% from two or more races. Hispanic or Latino of any race were 1.90% of the population.

There were 475 households, out of which 40.2% had children under the age of 18 living with them, 69.9% were married couples living together, 8.6% had a female householder with no husband present, and 18.5% were non-families. 14.9% of all households were made up of individuals, and 5.1% had someone living alone who was 65 years of age or older. The average household size was 2.88 and the average family size was 3.20.

In the town, the population was spread out, with 28.3% under the age of 18, 7.2% from 18 to 24, 32.2% from 25 to 44, 23.6% from 45 to 64, and 8.7% who were 65 years of age or older. The median age was 36 years. For every 100 females, there were 98.6 males. For every 100 females age 18 and over, there were 96.0 males.

The median income for a household in the town was $41,932, and the median income for a family was $44,531. Males had a median income of $31,581 versus $24,926 for females. The per capita income for the town was $17,896. About 3.9% of families and 4.4% of the population were below the poverty line, including 4.3% of those under age 18 and 11.1% of those age 65 or over.

== Queens Cup Steeplechase Races ==
Brooklandwood is a large 260+ acre farm and estate within the Town of Mineral Springs and an adjoining 44+ acres outside of the town for a total of 305 acres. Brooklandwood is the site of the Queens Cup Steeplechase, one of steeplechase horse racing's major annual events. The day consists of 5-6 jump races, and is held the last Saturday of every April. The schedule of events also features a Jack Russell Terrier judging contest. 12,000-18,000 people descend on Mineral Springs from all parts of the country but primarily within the seven county region of Charlotte, to take part in this day-long event of races and other activities.

On December 8, 2023 a press release was issued that read, – Earlier this year, Founders of the Queen’s Cup Steeplechase Races, produced by the non-profit Charlotte Steeplechase Foundation, announced plans to retire from their active roles both on the board of directors this past June as well as day-to-day operations of the Queen’s Cup immediately after the 2024 Race. After the announcement, the Queen’s Cup Team consisting of the Charlotte Steeplechase Foundation (CSF) board and members of the non-profit Dream on 3 team came together with the shared goal of preserving this historic event and the Price Family’s legacy as founders of the Queens Cup. After months of evaluation and planning, the very difficult decision was made by the Team and unanimously approved by the CSF Board, to cancel the 2024 race. Many factors were considered, however ultimately the complex logistical challenges associated with producing the event coupled with continued cost increases became the primary reasons for the decision. Though the 2024 race was cancelled, the CSF Board will continue to evaluate the viability and future of the event. After coming to this conclusion, co-founder Carrington Price said, “We are indebted to the Queen’s Cup team, volunteers and all those who have worked tirelessly over the nearly three decades to help produce the Queen’s Cup and it is with heavy heart [that] the announcement is being made. We are most appreciative of the loyal support from our sponsors, PSL holders, patrons, vendors and board”. Price went on to say, “It has been a true honor to host Charlotte’s largest philanthropic outdoor cocktail party where the horses were invited, and in doing so, the Charlotte Steeplechase Foundation has been able to gift over one million dollars to local charities.”
