= Weddington, North Carolina =

- Town
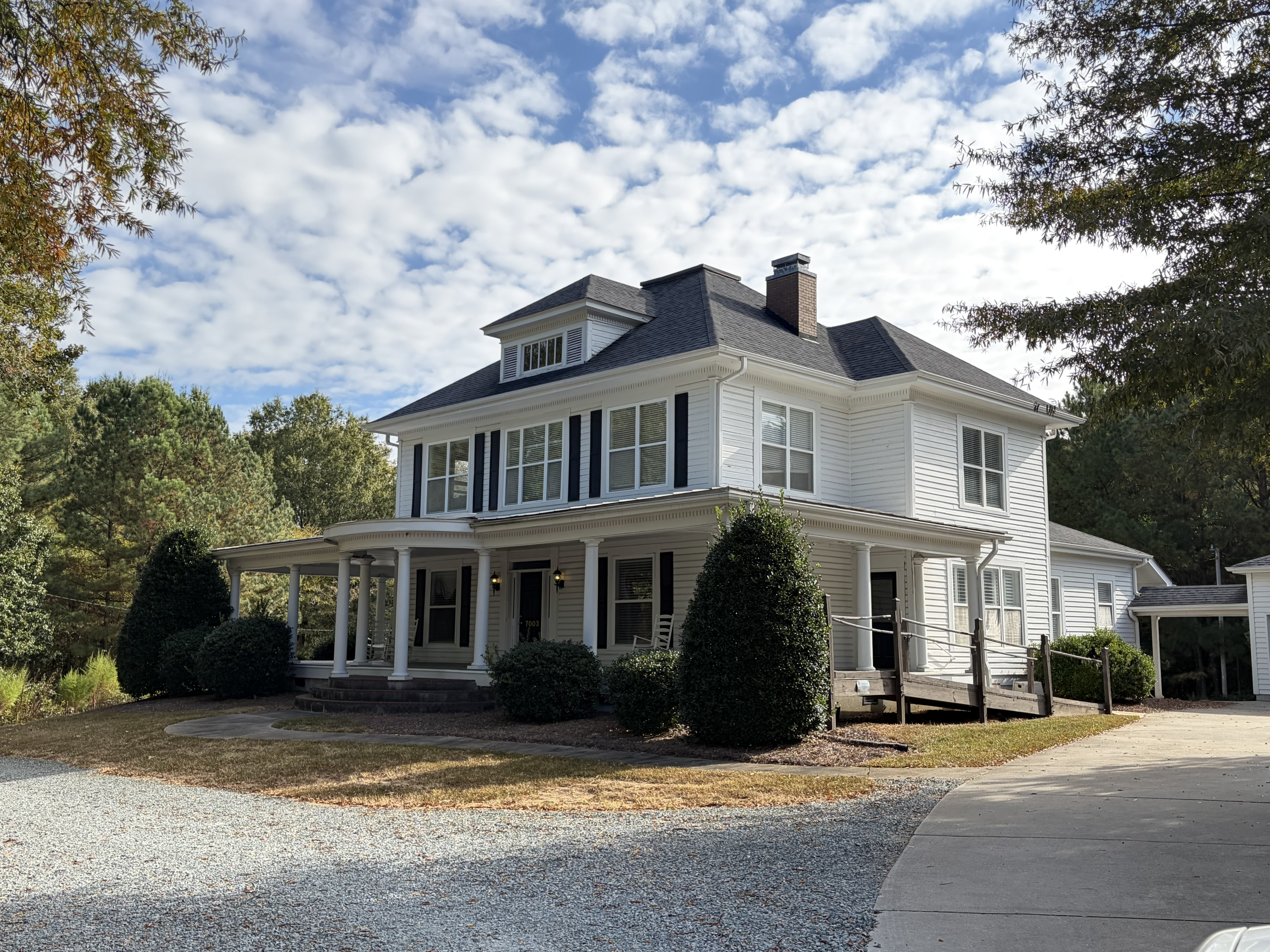
- The Hemby House, a relocated historic house in Weddington.

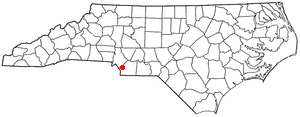
- Location of Weddington, North Carolina
- Coordinates: 35°01′12″N 80°45′52″W
- Country: United States
- State: North Carolina
- Counties: Union
- Incorporated: May 2, 1983
- Named for: Reuben B. Weddington

Government
  - Mayor: Jim Bell

Area
  - Total: 17.87 sq mi (46.29 km^{2})
  - Land: 17.53 sq mi (45.40 km^{2})
  - Water: 0.35 sq mi (0.90 km^{2})
- Elevation: 666 ft (203 m)

Population (2020)
  - Total: 13,181
  - Density: 752.0/sq mi (290.36/km^{2})
- Time zone: UTC-5 (Eastern (EST))
  - Summer (DST): UTC-4 (EDT)
- ZIP codes: 28104 & 28173
- Area code: 704
- FIPS code: 37-71680
- GNIS feature ID: 2406850
- Website: www.townofweddington.com

Weddington is a suburban town in Union County, North Carolina, United States. The population was 13,181 at the 2020 census. It is a suburb in the Charlotte metropolitan area. The current mayor of Weddington is Jim Bell.

== Geography ==
According to the United States Census Bureau, the town has a total area of 15.9 square miles (41.2 km^{2}), of which 15.8 square miles (40.9 km^{2}) is land and 0.1 square mile (0.3 km^{2}) (0.69%) is water.

== Demographics ==
Historical population
Census	Pop.	Note	%±
1990	3,803		—
2000	6,696		76.1%
2010	9,459		41.3%
2020	13,181		39.3%
2025 (est.)	14,517	▲	10.1%
U.S. Decennial Census

=== 2020 census ===
As of the 2020 census, Weddington had a population of 13,181. The median age was 42.8 years. 28.5% of residents were under the age of 18 and 14.1% of residents were 65 years of age or older. For every 100 females there were 100.6 males, and for every 100 females age 18 and over there were 99.1 males age 18 and over.

There were 4,159 households in Weddington, of which 46.0% had children under the age of 18 living in them. Of all households, 83.6% were married-couple households, 6.7% were households with a male householder and no spouse or partner present, and 8.2% were households with a female householder and no spouse or partner present. About 8.3% of all households were made up of individuals and 4.2% had someone living alone who was 65 years of age or older.

There were 4,297 housing units, of which 3.2% were vacant. The homeowner vacancy rate was 1.5% and the rental vacancy rate was 4.7%. 88.1% of residents lived in urban areas, while 11.9% lived in rural areas.

Weddington racial composition
Race	Number	Percentage
White (non-Hispanic)	10,176	77.2%
Black or African American (non-Hispanic)	594	4.51%
Native American	11	0.08%
Asian	1,230	9.33%
Pacific Islander	3	0.02%
Other/Mixed	534	4.05%
Hispanic or Latino	633	4.8%

=== 2010 census ===
At the 2010 census there were 9,459 people, 2,772 households, and 2,561 families in the town. The population density was 424.0 inhabitants per square mile (163.7/km^{2}). There were 2,919 housing units at an average density of 140.2 units per square mile (54.1 units/km^{2}). The racial makeup of the town was 93.4% White, 2.9% African American, 4.48% Asian, 1.0% from other races, and 1.7% from two or more races. Hispanic or Latino of any race were 5.2%.

Of the 2,772 households 46.1 had children under the age of 18 living with them, 89.2% were married couples living together, 0.9% had a female householder with no husband present, and 7.6% were non-families. 5.6% of households were one person and 1.2% were one person aged 65 or older. The average household size was 3.32 and the average family size was 3.46.

The age distribution was 29.5% under the age of 18, 5.6% from 18 to 24, 18.4% from 25 to 44, 37.1% from 45 to 64, and 9.4% 65 or older. The median age was 43.3 years. For every 100 females, there were 101.1 males.

The median household income was $132,331 and the median family income was $139,050. Males had a median income of $105,054 versus $57,368 for females. The per capita income for the town was $48,209. About 0.5% of families and 1.5% of the population were below the poverty line, including 1.9% of those under age 18 and 2.5% of those age 65 or over.

Weddington is notable for being North Carolina's third wealthiest town in terms of median household income.
