= Barringer Township, Iredell County, North Carolina =

Coordinates: 35°40′13″N 80°49′25″W

Barringer Township
- Township
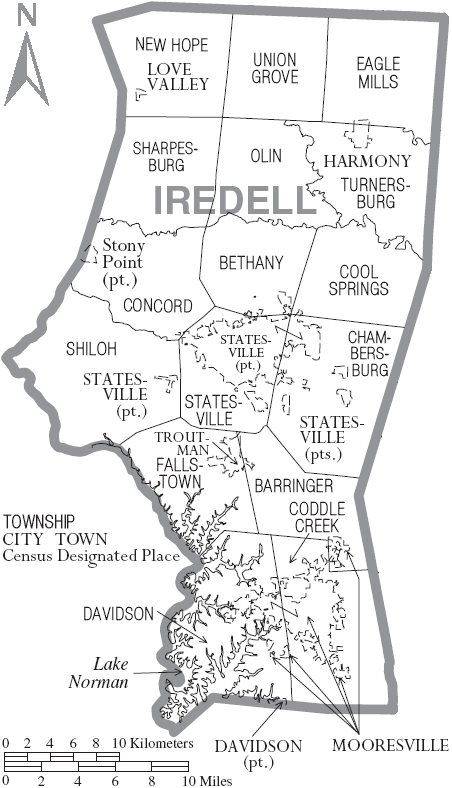
- Barringer Township in Iredell County
- Country: United States
- State: North Carolina
- County: Iredell
- Established in: 1868

Government
  - Type: non-functioning administrative division

Area
  - Total: 30.41 sq mi (78.76 km^{2})
  - Land: 30.34 sq mi (78.58 km^{2})
  - Water: 0.069 sq mi (0.18 km^{2})
- Elevation: 830 ft (253 m)

Population (2010)
  - Total: 6,533
  - Density: 215.3/sq mi (83.14/km^{2})
- Time zone: UTC-5 (Eastern (EST))
  - Summer (DST): UTC-4 (EDT)
- Zip Codes: 27013, 28115, 28125, 28166
- Area codes: 704, 980
- FIPS code: 097-90160
- GNIS feature ID: 1026812

Barringer Township is a non-functioning township in Iredell County, North Carolina, United States. By the requirements of the North Carolina Constitution of 1868, the counties were divided into townships, including sixteen in Iredell County.

== Geography ==
Barringer Township covers an area of 30.41 square miles (78.76 km^{2}), and of this, 0.07 square miles (0.18 km^{2}), or 0.23 percent, is water.

Barringer Township lies on the western edge of the Yadkin–Pee Dee River Basin. Bodies of water within Barringer Township include the following.

- I-L Creek
- Kerr Branch
- Rocky Branch
- Weathers Creek
- Withrow Creek

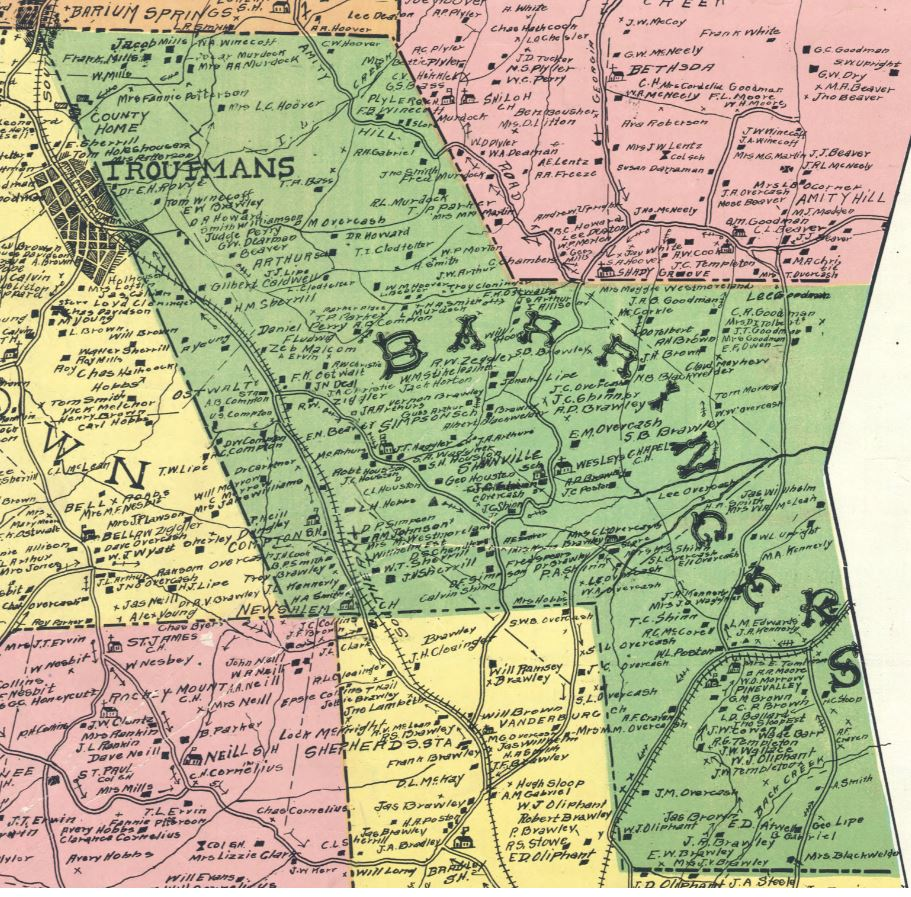
Barringer Township in 1917

=== Communities ===
- Mazeppa, unincorporated
- Mooresville, city (part)
- Statesville, city (part)
- Troutman, town (part)

=== Adjacent townships ===
The U.S. Census Bureau shows the following townships adjacent to Barringer.

- Chambersburg (north)
- Mount Ulla, Rowan County (east)
- Coddle Creek (south)
- Davidson (southwest)
- Fallstown (west)
- Statesville Township (northwest)

== Transportation ==
=== Airports ===
- Atwell Airport, a private airport with the Federal Aviation Administration (FAA) identifier of 1NC2, owned by Scott Atwell of Mooresville, is within Barringer Township.

=== Major highways ===
- I-77
- US 21
- NC 801
