= Concord Township, Iredell County, North Carolina =

Coordinates: 35°50′43″N 80°58′45″W

Concord Township
- Township
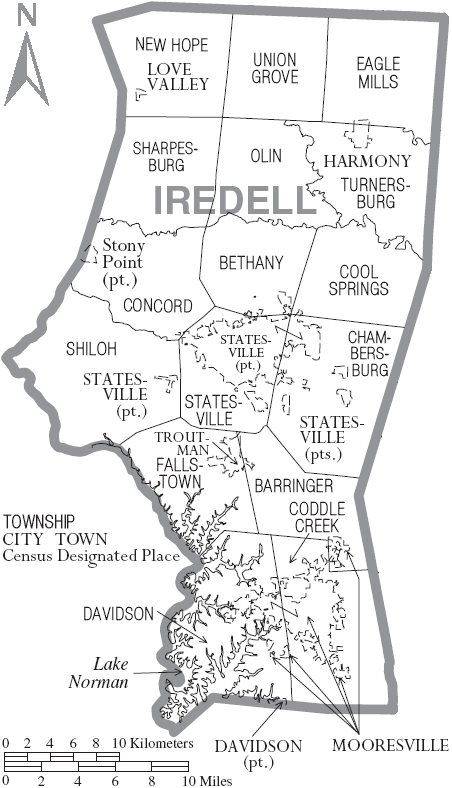
- Concord Township in Iredell County
- Country: United States
- State: North Carolina
- County: Iredell
- Established: 1868

Government
  - Type: non-functioning administrative division

Area
  - Total: 34.81 sq mi (90.2 km^{2})
  - Land: 34.65 sq mi (89.7 km^{2})
  - Water: 0.16 sq mi (0.41 km^{2})

Population (2010)
  - Total: 6,999
  - Density: 202/sq mi (78/km^{2})

Concord Township is a non-functioning administrative division of Iredell County, North Carolina, United States. By the requirements of the North Carolina Constitution of 1868, the counties were divided into townships, which included Concord township as one of sixteen townships in Iredell County.

== History ==
By the requirements of the North Carolina Constitution of 1868, the county was divided into townships. Previous to that time, the subdivisions were Captain's Districts. While the Captain's Districts referred primarily to the militia, it served also for the election precinct, the tax listing and tax collecting district.

== Geography and demography ==
Concord township is located in the central western portion of Iredell County. It borders Sharpesburg Township to the north, Alexander County to the west, Shiloh Township and Statesville Township to the south, and Bethany Township to the east.

Historical population
Census	Pop.	Note	%±
1880	1,209		—
1900	1,565		—
1910	1,613		3.1%
1920	1,649		2.2%
1930	1,890		14.6%
1940	2,470		30.7%

=== Towns, churches, and schools ===
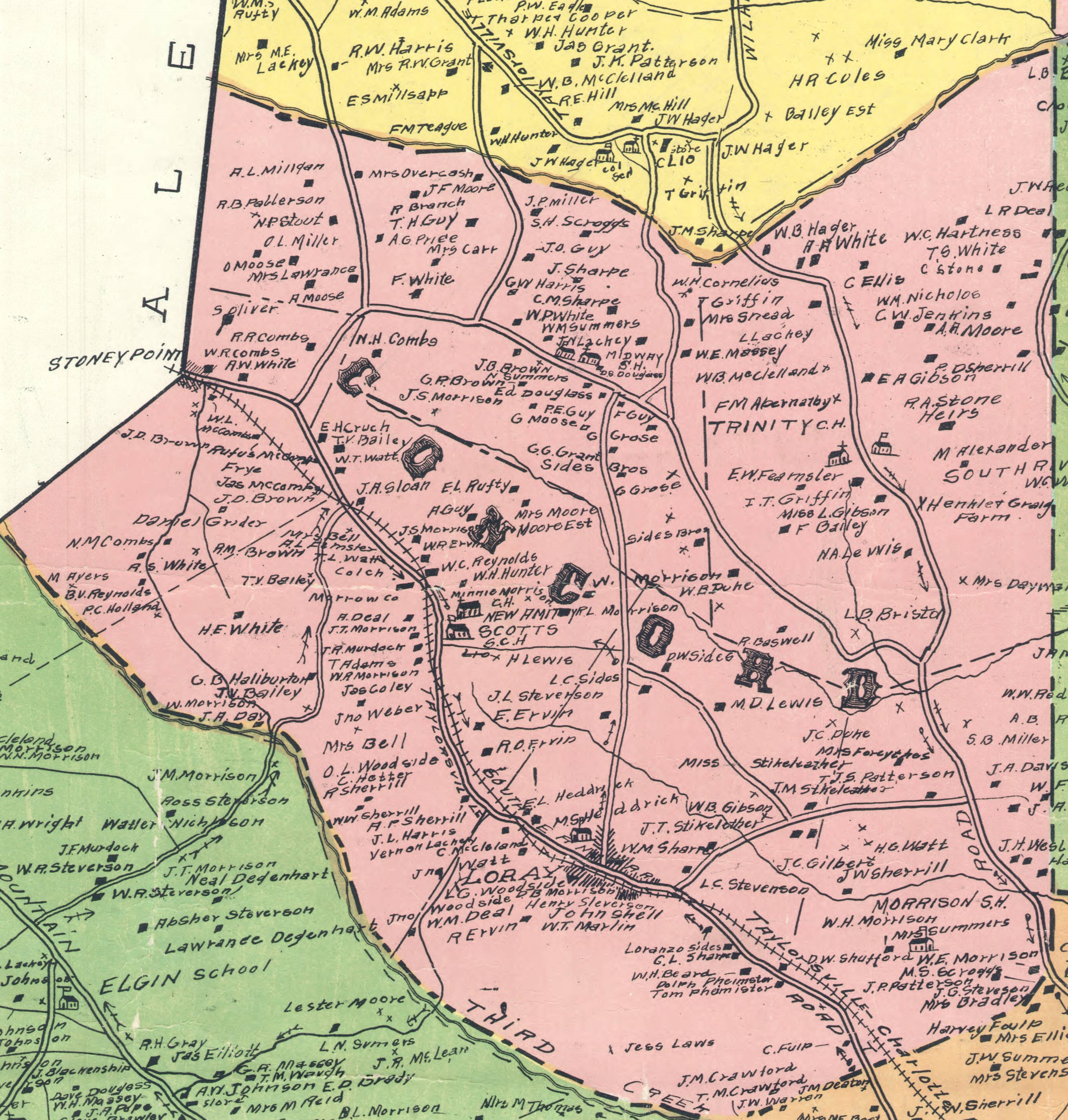
Concord Township in 1917

Post offices and unincorporated towns

- Loray (was Fancy Hill from March 6, 1840 to August 17, 1908 with James Mears as first post master, William P. Gibson became first post master of Loray on August 17, 1908)
- Scotts (was Scotts Crossroads with Rufus W.H. Feimster as first postmaster on March 21, 1873, name changed to Scotts on July 26, 1894 with Sarah C. Feimster as postmaster)
- Stony Point Census Designated Place (Stoney Point Post Office was established on February 17, 1826 in Iredell County with James Thompson as postmaster. The name was changed to Stony Point in 1832. The Stony Point populated place has existed in both Alexander and Iredell Counties since 1847 when Alexander County was created.

Churches and Cemeteries

- Concord Presbyterian Church (established in 1775)
- Logan Presbyterian Church
- Monticello Baptist Church
- Morrison Cemetery
- New Amity Associated Reformed Presbyterian Church (established in 1848)
- New Sterling Associated Reformed Presbyterian Church (established in 1787)
- Trinity United Methodist Church
- Unity Christian Church

Schools

- Scotts School was a first through 12th grade school. The high school was operated from at least 1942 until 1966 when Iredell County schools were consolidated.
- Scotts Elementary School
