= Shiloh Township, Iredell County, North Carolina =

Coordinates: 35°46′07″N 81°01′21″W

Shiloh Township
- Township
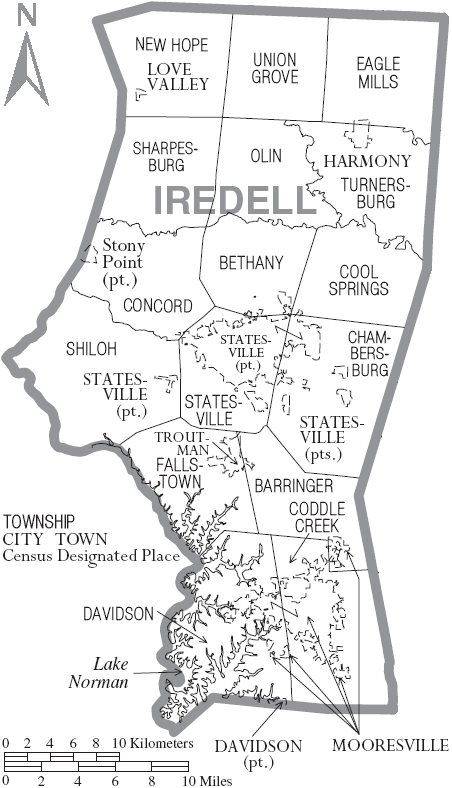
- Shiloh Township in Iredell County
- Country: United States
- State: North Carolina
- County: Iredell
- Established: 1868

Government
  - Type: non-functioning administrative division of county

Area
  - Total: 52.72 sq mi (136.5 km^{2})
  - Land: 51.47 sq mi (133.3 km^{2})
  - Water: 1.25 sq mi (3.2 km^{2})

Population (2010)
  - Total: 8,705
  - Density: 169.1/sq mi (65.3/km^{2})

Shiloh Township is a township in Iredell County, North Carolina, United States. Shiloh Township is a non-functioning administrative division of Iredell County, North Carolina, United States. By the requirements of the North Carolina Constitution of 1868, the counties were divided into townships, which included Shiloh township as one of sixteen townships in Iredell County.

== Geography ==
Shiloh Township is bordered by Concord Township on the north, Fallstown Township on the south, Statesville Township to the east, and Alexander County and Catawba County to the west.
