= Shinnville =

Unincorporated area in North Carolina

Shinnville Also known as: Shinnsville, Shinsville
- Unincorporated populated area
- Interactive map of Shinnville
- Coordinates: 35.6587492°N 80.8031273°W
- Country: United States
- State: North Carolina
- County: Iredell
- Township: Barringer
- Established: mid-1800's
- Named for: Calvin Shinn

Shinnville is an unincorporated area located in Barringer Township, Iredell County, North Carolina, 6 miles NE of Mooresville, North Carolina.

== Geography ==
Shinnville is located at the intersection of Winthrow Creek Road, Weathers Creek Road, and Shinnville Road.

== History ==
Shinnville is formerly home to the now-demolished G.C. Shinn Grocery and Market located at 832 Shinnville Rd, opening in the late 1800's. The brick building was built in 1959 after the frame building was demolished. A post office existed in Shinnville in 1900, and Shinn's school existed as early as 1902. Shinnville is also home to St. James Episcopal Church and Cemetery. The cemetery was used as burial grounds for the Mills family, and their servants. The name Shinnville began use in the mid to late 1800's after Calvin Shinn, the great-grandfather of Glenn C. Shinn Jr, owner of G.C. Shinn Grocery and Market.

== Notable people ==
NASCAR driver Dale Earnhardt Jr. lives in Shinnville.

== In popular culture ==
St. James Episcopal Church's Cemetery, located on Weathers Creek Road, is home to the mythological Shinnville Witch. According to local legend, the Shinnville 'witch' was allegedly a Mills Family slave/servant that was buried outside the cemetery walls. The Shinnville Witch has drawn journalists and ghost hunters alike to the area.
