= Adam Torrence =

Private Adam Torrence Sr.
- Born: Adam Torrence; 1722; Ireland
- Died: June 20, 1780 (aged 57–58); Ramsour's Mill, Lincoln County, North Carolina
- Spouse: Anna Brandon
- Relatives: Sons: Adam Torrence Jr, Hugh Torrence
- Military career
- Allegiance: United States of America
- Branch: Militia
- Service years: 1780
- Rank: Private
- Units: Mecklenburg County Regiment, North Carolina Militia
- Conflicts: Battle of Ramsour's Mill

Adam Torrence Sr. (1732 – June 20, 1780) was the owner of Torrence's Tavern in Rowan County, North Carolina, before 1780. He was a soldier in the Mecklenburg County Regiment, North Carolina militia and killed at the Battle of Ramsour's Mill in Lincoln County, North Carolina during the American Revolution. After his death, his wife, Ann (Bonar) Torrence was managing the tavern when the Battle of Torrence's Tavern took place nearby.

== Family ==
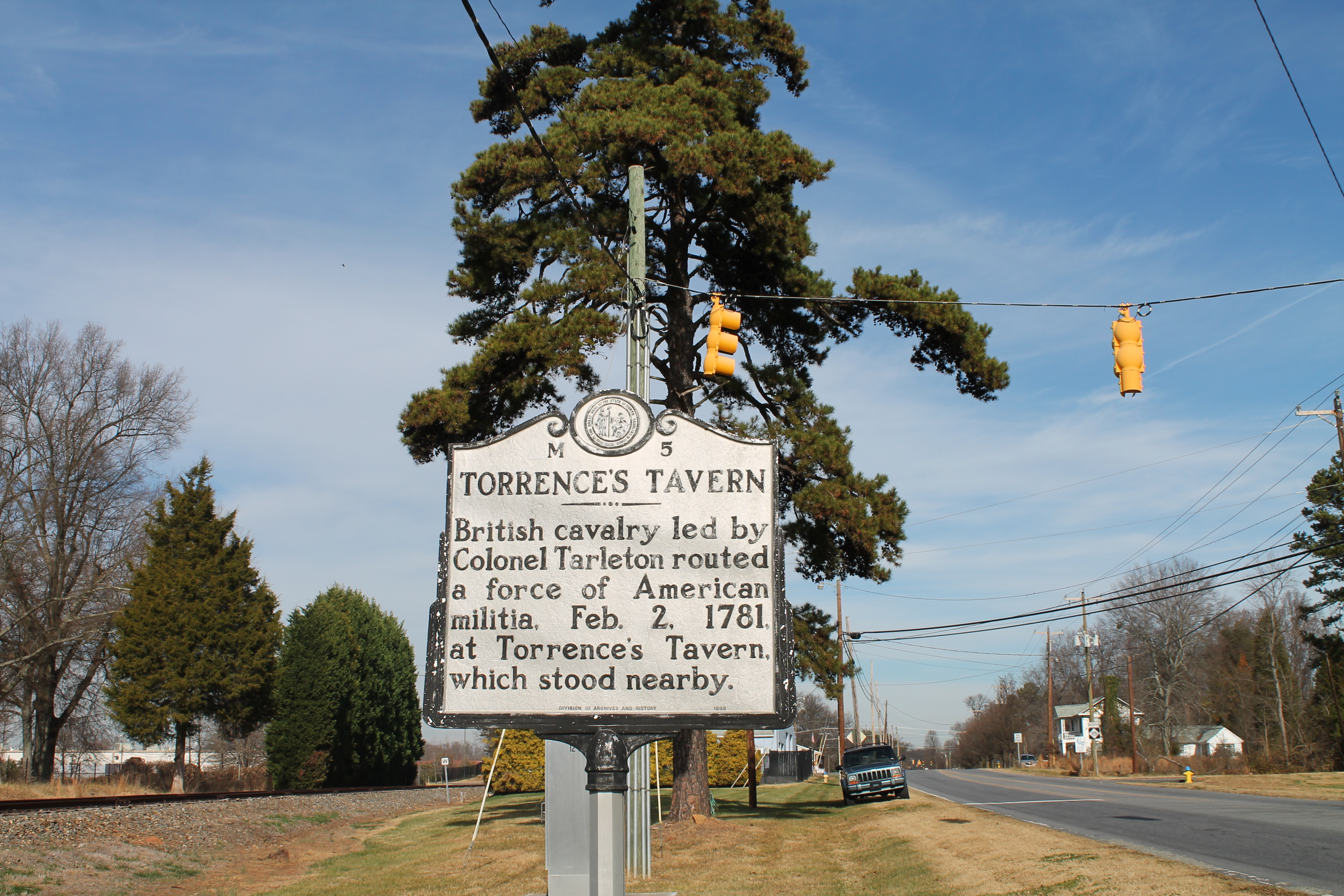
The historical marker located near the site of the Battle of Torrence's Tavern in present-day Mount Mourne

Adam was the son of Hugh Torrence and Sarah Marjory (Cunningham) Torrence of Londonderry, Ireland. His parents migrated to Pennsylvania in the 1700s, where Adam married Ann Bonar. Adam and Ann moved to Rowan County, North Carolina before the American Revolution. They had the following children: Hugh Torrence, Adam Torrence Jr., George Torrence, Barnabas Torrence, Elizabeth (Torrence) McKnight, Alexander Torrence and Margaret Torrence. They owned a tavern in Rowan County (currently Iredell County near Mount Mourne), Province of North Carolina. Hugh Torrence became the first sheriff of Iredell County.

== Revolutionary War Service ==
Both Adam Torrence Sr. and his son, Adam Torrence Jr. were members of the Mecklenburg County Regiment under Captain James Houston. Adam was killed at the Battle of Ramsour's Mill and his son, Adam Jr. was wounded at the battle. His son stated in his pension application: "at the Battle of Ramsour's Lincoln County where I saw my Father fall on the field of Battle being shot dead through the head by a ball & a few moments afterwards I was shot in the hip & which hurt me all my life since."

The Battle of Torrence's Tavern was fought on February 1, 1781, near Torrence's Tavern. It was the only major battle or skirmish to be fought during the Revolutionary War in what became Iredell County in 1788.
