= Iredell County, North Carolina =

County in North Carolina, United States

- County
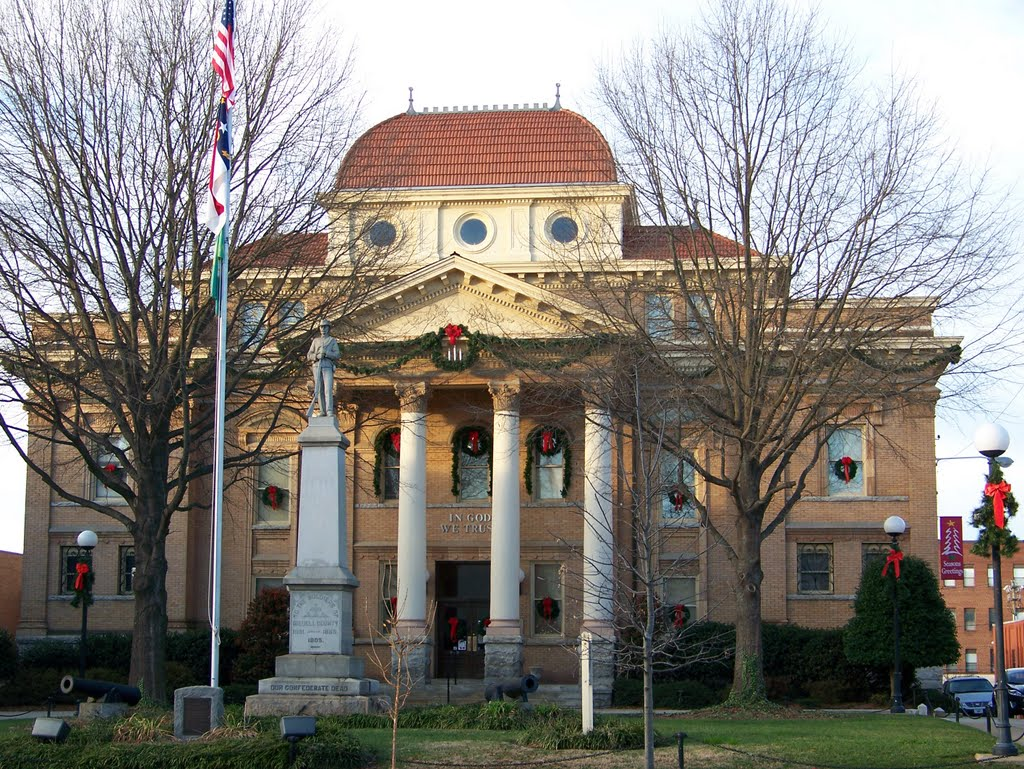
- Iredell County Courthouse and Confederate Monument in Statesville

- Seal Logo
- Motto: "Crossroads for the Future"
- Location within the U.S. state of North Carolina
- Interactive map of Iredell County, North Carolina
- Coordinates: 35.81°N 80.87°W
- Country: United States
- State: North Carolina
- Founded: 1788
- Named for: James Iredell
- Seat: Statesville
- Largest community: Mooresville

Area
  - Total: 597.39 sq mi (1,547.2 km^{2})
  - Land: 574.41 sq mi (1,487.7 km^{2})
  - Water: 22.98 sq mi (59.5 km^{2}) 3.85%

Population (2020)
  - Total: 186,693
  - Estimate (2025): 211,798 ▲
  - Density: 325.02/sq mi (125.49/km^{2})
- Time zone: UTC−5 (Eastern)
  - Summer (DST): UTC−4 (EDT)
- Congressional district: 10th
- Website: www.iredellcountync.gov

Iredell County (/ˈaɪərdɛl/ EYE-ər-del) is a county located in the U.S. state of North Carolina. As of the 2020 census, the population was 186,693. Its county seat is Statesville, and its largest community is Mooresville. The county was formed in 1788, subtracted from Rowan County. It is named for James Iredell, one of the first justices of the Supreme Court. Iredell County is included in the Charlotte metropolitan area, as defined by the Office of Management and Budget, with data from the U.S. Census Bureau.

== History ==
Before colonization, many tribes inhabited the area, such as the Catawba, the Waccamaw, the Cheraw, the Winyah, the Wateree and the Sugaree. The following list shows significant events and firsts in the history of the area that is now called Iredell County, North Carolina.

Detail of a 1770 map of North Carolina by John Collett depicting the locations of Fort Dobbs, the Yadkin and Catawba Rivers, and Salisbury

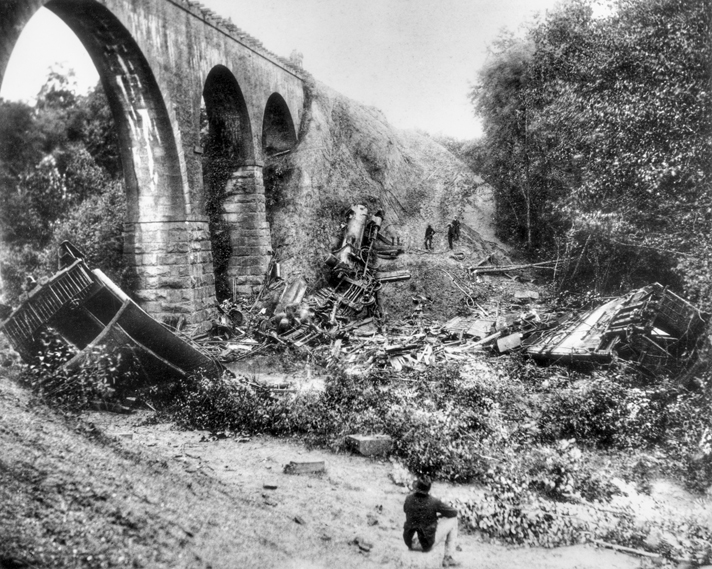
Bostian Bridge Train Wreck in 1891. Remains of the locomotive and wooden passenger cars at the base of the 60-foot-high Bostian Bridge, over Third Creek near Statesville.

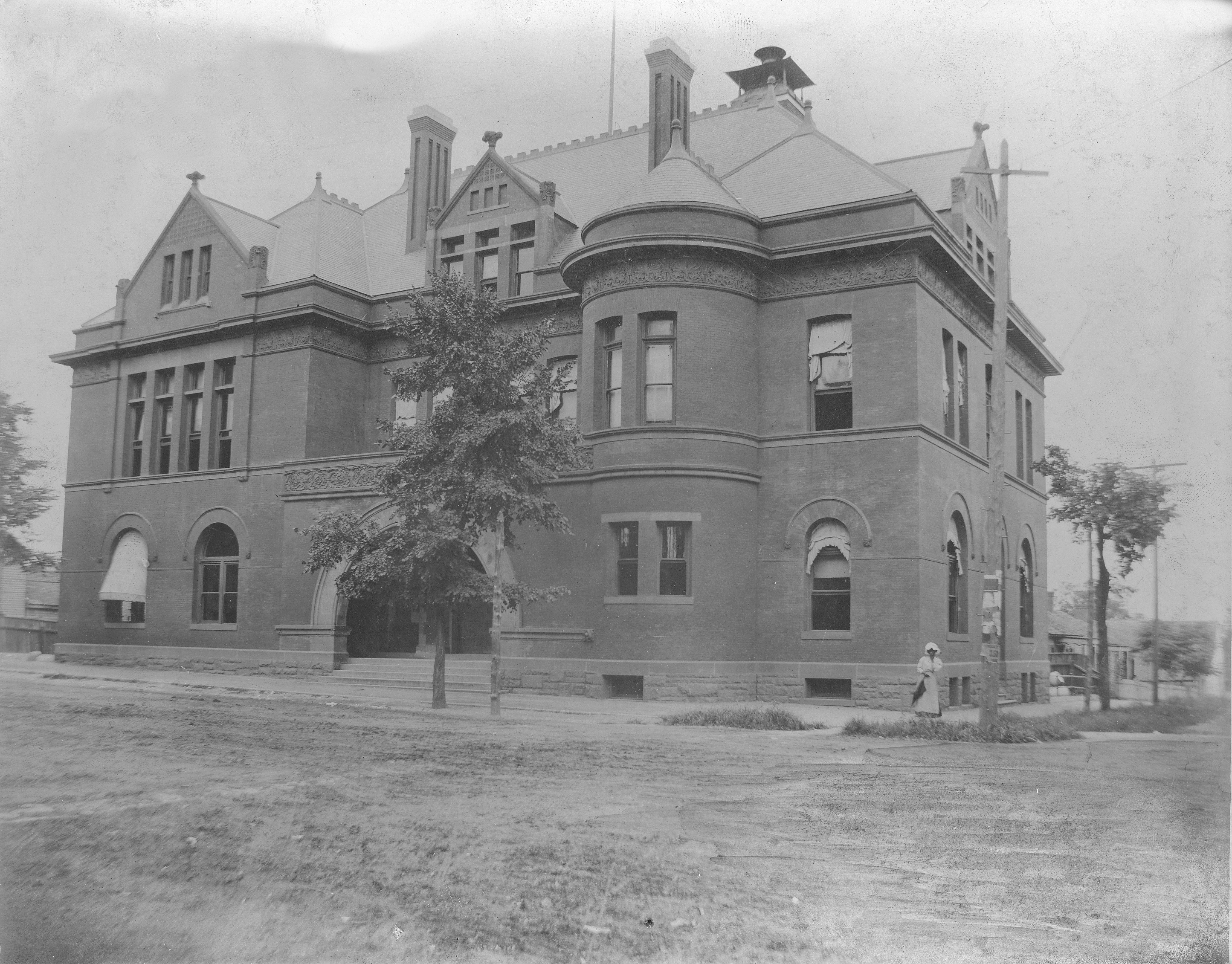
Historice Statesville Court House and Post Office, c. 1900

- 1629–1712 – Province of Carolina ruled by Lords Proprietors under British rule
- 1712–1776 – Province of North Carolina and Province of South Carolina created from Province of Carolina
- 1734 – Bladen County formed from New Hanover County
- 1730–1750 – first Scots-Irish and German immigrants seeking good soil, game, and proximity to fresh water had settled the area of modern-day Iredell County
- 1750 – Anson County formed from Bladen County
- 1750–1776 – Lord Granville and later his son issued Granville Grants of land in the Granville District, which included the area that later became Iredell County but was then Anson and later Rowan Counties
- 1750 – Fourth Creek Congregation established
- 1753 – Rowan County created from a portion of Anson County
- 1754–1763 – Fort Dobbs (named after Governor Arthur Dobbs) was erected as a defense facility during the French and Indian War (1754–63). Today, the location of Fort Dobbs is a North Carolina State Historic Site.
- 1761 – Coddle Creek Associate Reformed Presbyterian Church, Session House and Cemetery established in what became Mooresville
- 1765 – Centre Presbyterian Church established in what became Mooresville
- 1773 – William Sharpe creates map of 4th Creek Congregation
- 1775 – Bethany Presbyterian Church (north of Fourth Creek on Fifth Creek) and Concord Presbyterian Church (west of Fourth Creek) established as offshoots of the Fourth Creek Congregation
- 1775, August 1 – Rowan County Regiment, North Carolina Militia established; most Iredell residents that saw service while in North Carolina, served in this regiment; for a time in 1775 and 1782 the regiment was divided into 1st and 2nd Rowan County Regiment
- 1775–1783 – North Carolina contributes 30,000 to 36,000 men during the American Revolutionary War, including the Continental Army, local North Carolina County Regiments of militia, and other State Troops
- 1776, July 4 – United States Declaration of Independence signing
- 1777 – State of North Carolina began issuing State Land Grants from land that came from Lord Granville estate in the Granville District
- 1778, August – Adlai Osborne compiles Tax List of Rowan County to raise money for the upcoming Revolutionary War, including Capt Caldwell's, Capt Nichols', Capt Falls', and Capt Purviance's Districts that would become part of Iredell County in 1788
- 1780, June 20 – Battle of Ramsour's Mill nearby in what is today Lincolnton, North Carolina, many Rowan County soldiers were killed at this battle
- 1787 – New Sterling ARP Church established in Buffalo Shoals area that would become New Sterling
- 1788, November 3 – Iredell County was incorporated in 1788 when it was formed from adjacent Rowan County. It is named for Honorable James Iredell, Sr. (1751–1799), Attorney General of North Carolina during the Revolutionary War, Supreme Court Justice, and a delegate to the Constitutional Convention of 1788. Its county seat is Statesville.
- 1789, November 21 – North Carolina admitted to the Union as the 12th state
- 1789 – Fourth Creek Congregation location chosen by the legislature as county seat of Iredell County, named Statesville
- 1790s – McKendree United Methodist Church established in Mooresville
- 1790 – August 13 – first 26 lots sold in Statesville
- 1794 – Grassy Knob Baptist Church established near what would become Union Grove in northern Iredell County
- 1800 – U.S. census shows 11 heads of household, including 68 free white persons and 27 slaves in "States Ville"
- 1801 – first post office established in Statesville
- 1805 – Mount Mourne post office established
- 1819 – second county courthouse built in Statesville
- 1847 – The only major cession of Iredell territory to another county was that to Alexander County, created in early 1847 from Iredell, Burke, and Wilkes counties.
- 1854 – fire burns second county courthouse and court house records
- 1858 – The arrival of the Western North Carolina Railroad in 1858, soon followed by the Atlantic, Tennessee and Ohio Railroad
- 1861–1865 – American Civil War
- 1866 – Freedom United Presbyterian Church and Logan Presbyterian Church, first free black churches, established in Statesville
- 1868, May 1 – former Confederate soldier Tom Dooley hung in Statesville
- 1891, August 27 – The railway accident on the Bostian Bridge killed 23 people on August 27, 1891, west of Statesville, North Carolina, when a Richmond & Danville Railroad train derailed.
- 1891 – third U.S. Post Office and County Courthouse built in Statesville
- 1899 – fourth Iredell County Courthouse built in Statesville
- 1900s – Industries producing tobacco, liquor, and herbs (Statesville's Wallace Herbarium was one of the largest such facilities in the world during the late 19th and early 20th centuries) were later supplemented by the production of livestock, dairy products, and breeder chickens, of which the county remains a leading producer.
- 1924 – Ole Time Fiddlers' Convention in Union Grove started by H.P. VanHoy to benefit local school
- 1954 – cowboy town of Love Valley created by Jeter Andrew Barker
- 1974, about – National Balloon Rally/Fest in Troutman
- The North Carolina Auto Racing Hall of Fame in Mooresville (known as "Race City USA")

== Geography ==
According to the U.S. Census Bureau, the county has a total area of 597.39 square miles (1,547.2 km^{2}), of which 574.41 square miles (1,487.7 km^{2}) is land and 22.98 square miles (59.5 km^{2}) (3.85%) is water.

Iredell County is located within the Piedmont Region of central North Carolina. The northwestern section of the county contains the Brushy Mountains, a deeply eroded spur of the Blue Ridge Mountains far to the west. The highest point in Iredell County, Fox Mountain, is in the Brushies; it rises to 1,760 feet. Although the "Brushies", as they are often called locally, are not high in the normal sense, they do rise prominently above the surrounding countryside. The remainder of Iredell County consists of gently rolling countryside occasionally broken by low hills and small river valleys. The county's largest river, the Catawba, forms much of its western border. Lake Norman, North Carolina's largest manmade lake, is the most prominent geographic feature of southern Iredell County; it is often called North Carolina's "inland sea".

Iredell County is an important transportation center for the state, as Interstate 77 and Interstate 40 cross in northeast Statesville. This has given birth to the county's slogan "Crossroads for the Future." Residents have easy access going south on I-77 to Charlotte; north on I-77 to Elkin, North Carolina and Roanoke, Virginia; east on I-40 to Winston-Salem, Greensboro and Raleigh; and west along I-40 to Hickory, North Carolina and Asheville.

The northern third of Iredell County is highly rural and contains no large towns. Due to the thinly populated nature of this portion of the state, it is one of the select places in North Carolina where the speed limit on Interstate Highways exceeds 65 mph, as Interstate 77 north of Statesville has a speed limit of 70 mph.

Iredell County is one of the longest counties in the state and stretches for nearly fifty miles north to south, from Yadkin County in the north to Mecklenburg County in the south.

=== State and local protected areas/sites ===
- Fort Dobbs State Historic Site
- Lake Norman State Park

=== Major water bodies ===
- Back Creek
- Buffalo Shoals Creek
- Catawba River
- Fifth Creek
- Fourth Creek
- Hunting Creek
- Lake Norman
- Lookout Shoals Lake
- Morrison Creek
- North Little Hunting Creek
- Olin Creek
- Patterson Creek
- Rocky Creek
- Rocky River
- Snow Creek
- South Fork Withrow Creek
- South Yadkin River
- Third Creek
- Withrow Creek

=== Adjacent counties ===
- Yadkin County – north (created from Surry County in 1850)
- Davie County – east (created from Rowan County in 1836)
- Rowan County – east (created from Anson County in 1753)
- Cabarrus County – southeast (created from Mecklenburg County in 1792)
- Mecklenburg County – south (created from Anson County in 1762)
- Lincoln County – southwest (created from Tryon County in 1779)
- Catawba County – southwest (created from Lincoln County in 1842)
- Alexander County – west (created from Caldwell, Iredell, and Wilkes Counties in 1847)
- Wilkes County – north (created from Surry County and parts of Washington District in 1777)

=== Major highways ===
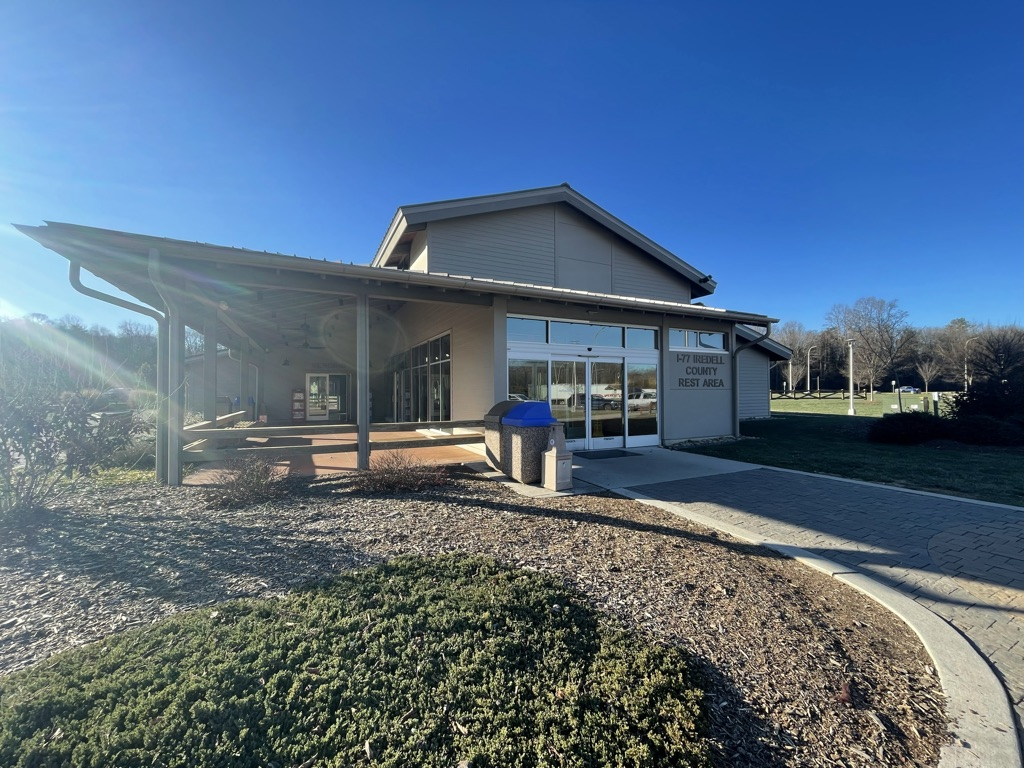
The Iredell County rest area is centered between north and southbound lanes of I-77

- I-40
- I-77
- US 21
- US 64
- US 70
- NC 3
- NC 90
- NC 115
- NC 150
- NC 152
- NC 801
- NC 901

=== Major infrastructure ===
- City of Statesville Regional Airport
- Davis Regional Heliport, near Statesville
- Iredell County is served by two railroads, Alexander Railroad and Norfolk Southern Railway
- Lake Norman Airpark, near Mooresville

== Demographics ==
Historical population
Census	Pop.	Note	%±
1790	5,430		—
1800	8,856		63.1%
1810	10,972		23.9%
1820	13,071		19.1%
1830	14,918		14.1%
1840	15,685		5.1%
1850	14,719		−6.2%
1860	15,347		4.3%
1870	16,931		10.3%
1880	22,675		33.9%
1890	25,462		12.3%
1900	29,064		14.1%
1910	34,315		18.1%
1920	37,956		10.6%
1930	46,693		23.0%
1940	50,424		8.0%
1950	56,303		11.7%
1960	62,526		11.1%
1970	72,197		15.5%
1980	82,538		14.3%
1990	92,931		12.6%
2000	122,660		32.0%
2010	159,437		30.0%
2020	186,693		17.1%
2025 (est.)	211,798	▲	13.4%
U.S. Decennial Census; 1790–1960 1810{–1850; 1900–1990 1990–2000; 2010 2020

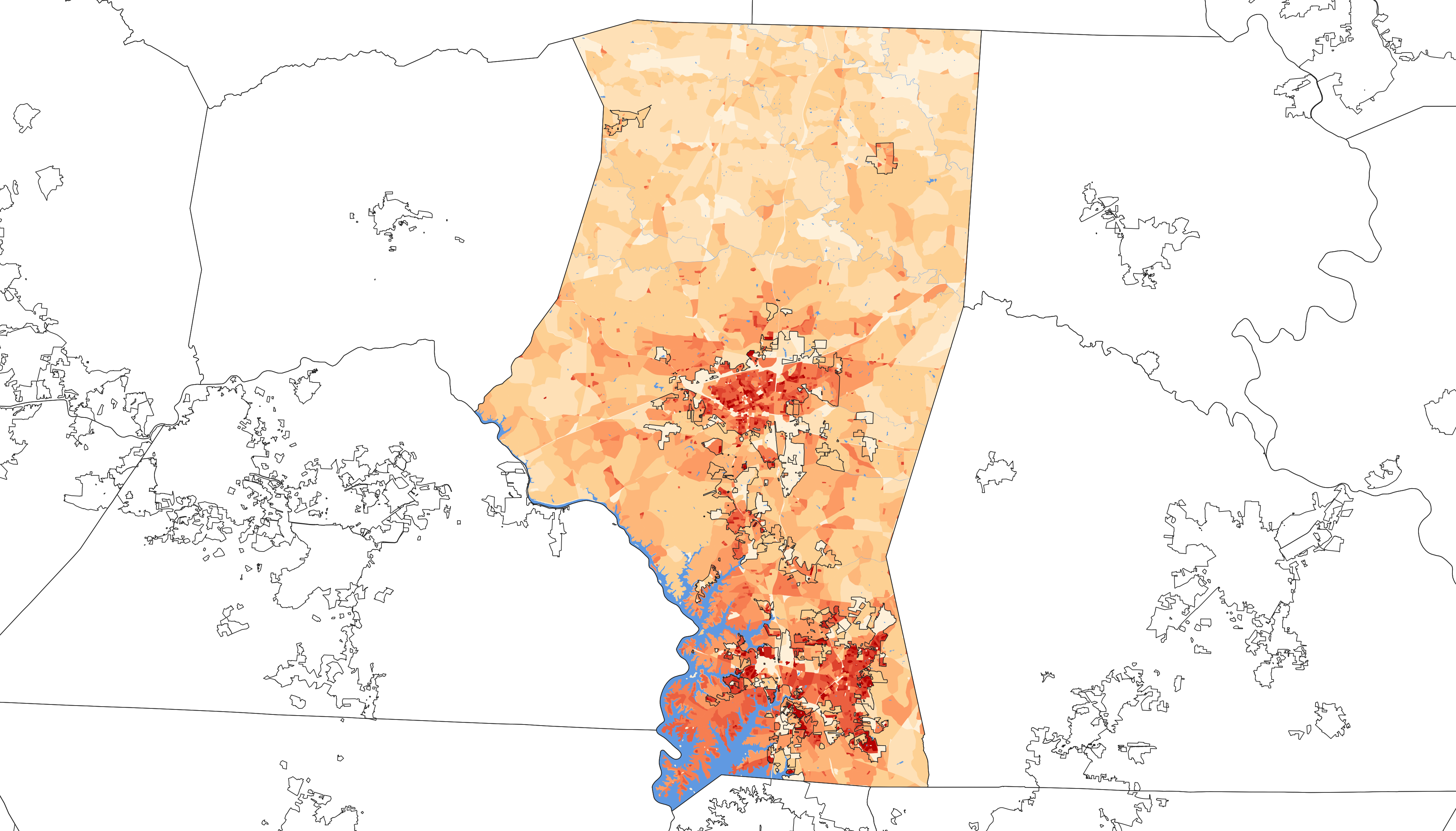
2020 population density of Iredell County NC by census block

=== 2020 census ===
Iredell County, North Carolina – Racial and ethnic composition Note: the US Census treats Hispanic/Latino as an ethnic category. This table excludes Latinos from the racial categories and assigns them to a separate category. Hispanics/Latinos may be of any race.
Race / Ethnicity (NH = Non-Hispanic)	Pop 1980	Pop 1990	Pop 2000	Pop 2010	Pop 2020	% 1980	% 1990	% 2000	% 2010	% 2020
White alone (NH)	67,540	76,897	99,027	124,107	136,393	81.83%	82.75%	80.73%	77.84%	73.06%
Black or African American alone (NH)	14,164	14,821	16,620	18,748	21,255	17.16%	15.95%	13.55%	11.76%	11.39%
Native American or Alaska Native alone (NH)	129	185	296	416	437	0.16%	0.20%	0.24%	0.26%	0.23%
Asian alone (NH)	117	342	1,535	2,899	4,718	0.14%	0.37%	1.25%	1.82%	2.53%
Native Hawaiian or Pacific Islander alone (NH)	x	x	22	36	58	x	x	0.02%	0.02%	0.03%
Other race alone (NH)	34	14	86	178	656	0.04%	0.02%	0.07%	0.11%	0.35%
Mixed race or Multiracial (NH)	x	x	892	2,209	7,399	x	x	0.73%	1.39%	3.96%
Hispanic or Latino (any race)	554	672	4,182	10,844	15,777	0.67%	0.72%	3.41%	6.80%	8.45%
Total	82,538	92,931	122,660	159,437	186,693	100.00%	100.00%	100.00%	100.00%	100.00%

As of the 2020 census, there were 186,693 people and 49,635 families residing in the county. The median age was 41.2 years, 23.0% of residents were under the age of 18, and 16.8% of residents were 65 years of age or older; for every 100 females there were 96.4 males, and for every 100 females age 18 and over there were 94.0 males age 18 and over.

There were 72,706 households in the county, of which 32.3% had children under the age of 18 living in them. Of all households, 52.3% were married-couple households, 16.8% were households with a male householder and no spouse or partner present, and 24.7% were households with a female householder and no spouse or partner present. About 24.7% of all households were made up of individuals and 10.1% had someone living alone who was 65 years of age or older.

There were 79,372 housing units, of which 8.4% were vacant. Among occupied housing units, 71.1% were owner-occupied and 28.9% were renter-occupied. The homeowner vacancy rate was 1.4% and the rental vacancy rate was 7.0%.

The racial makeup of the county was 74.7% White, 11.6% Black or African American, 0.4% American Indian and Alaska Native, 2.6% Asian, less than 0.1% Native Hawaiian and Pacific Islander, 4.1% from some other race, and 6.7% from two or more races. Hispanic or Latino residents of any race comprised 8.5% of the population.

68.1% of residents lived in urban areas, while 31.9% lived in rural areas.

=== 2010 census ===
At the 2010 census, there were 159,437 people, and 59,593 households in the county. The population density was 277.8 people per square mile (107.3 people/km^{2}). As of 2013 there were 69,325 housing units at an average density of 90 per square mile (35/km^{2}). The racial makeup of the county was 83.3% White, 12.3% Black or African American, 0.5% Native American, 2.2% Asian, 0.1% Pacific Islander, 1.68% from other races, and 1.6% from two or more races. 7.0% of the population were Hispanic or Latino of any race.

=== 2000 census ===
According to the 2000 census data, there were 47,360 households, out of which 33.5% had children under the age of 18 living with them, 57.8% were married couples living together, 11.3% had a female householder with no husband present, and 26.8% were non-families. 22.7% of all households were made up of individuals, and 8.4% had someone living alone who was 65 years of age or older. The average household size was 2.56 and the average family size was 3.00.

In the county, the population was spread out, with 25.5% under the age of 18, 7.5% from 18 to 24, 31.3% from 25 to 44, 23.3% from 45 to 64, and 12.4% who were 65 years of age or older. The median age was 36 years. For every 100 females there were 96.1 males. For every 100 females age 18 and over, there were 93.1 males.

As of 2013, the median income for a household in the county was $50,058. Males had a median income of $34,590 versus $24,031 for females. The per capita income for the county was $26,348. About 6.2% of families and 13.5% of the population were below the poverty line, including 10.1% of those under age 18 and 9.8% of those age 65 or over.

== Government and politics ==
Iredell County is governed by the Board of Commissioners, consisting of five commissioners elected at-large, which requires each to attract a majority of the votes.

The Iredell County Commissioners (2016–present) are James Mallory (chairman), Marvin Norman, Tommy Bowles, Jeff McNeely and Gene Houpe, all Republicans.

Iredell County is a member of the Centralina Council of Governments.

The Register of Deeds of Iredell County is Ronald "Duck" Wyatt (Republican), appointed in 2016. The Register of Deeds serves as custodian and manager of a large number of land records and vital records.

Iredell County is part of prosecutorial District 22A with Alexander County. The Iredell County Courthouse is located in the county seat of Statesville, North Carolina. The District Attorney is Sarah Kirkman.

The Senior Resident Superior Court Judge is Joe Crosswhite. The Chief District Court Judge is Dale Graham. James Lee (Jim) Mixson III has served as Iredell County's Clerk of Superior Court since 2012. Clerks of Superior Court in North Carolina also serve as Probate Judges in addition to their administrative duties.

Since 1952, Iredell County voting records show a strong Republican majority. Before 1952, however, Iredell was part of the Democratic "Solid South" and voted for no Republican presidential candidate after Reconstruction except Herbert Hoover in 1928. In 1964, the year that national civil rights legislation was passed, it was one of 13 North Carolina counties to vote for Barry Goldwater. In the past 17 elections, the only Democrat to carry Iredell County was Jimmy Carter in 1976, who was a native son of Georgia and the South.

United States presidential election results for Iredell County, North Carolina
Year	Republican		Democratic		Third party(ies)	
Year	No.	%	No.	%	No.	%
1880	1,616	40.35%	2,389	59.65%	0	0.00%
1884	1,736	39.44%	2,644	60.06%	22	0.50%
1888	1,894	40.41%	2,720	58.03%	73	1.56%
1892	1,524	33.91%	2,282	50.78%	688	15.31%
1896	2,003	40.25%	2,958	59.45%	15	0.30%
1900	2,044	44.00%	2,523	54.32%	78	1.68%
1904	1,510	41.08%	2,126	57.83%	40	1.09%
1908	1,803	42.19%	2,465	57.67%	6	0.14%
1912	392	9.88%	2,528	63.69%	1,049	26.43%
1916	2,073	38.33%	3,335	61.67%	0	0.00%
1920	4,402	40.49%	6,470	59.51%	0	0.00%
1924	3,565	35.12%	6,449	63.54%	136	1.34%
1928	6,712	58.12%	4,836	41.88%	0	0.00%
1932	3,583	29.85%	8,367	69.70%	55	0.46%
1936	3,817	25.24%	11,308	74.76%	0	0.00%
1940	3,820	27.00%	10,328	73.00%	0	0.00%
1944	4,864	36.79%	8,358	63.21%	0	0.00%
1948	4,441	36.59%	5,761	47.47%	1,934	15.94%
1952	11,804	57.91%	8,580	42.09%	0	0.00%
1956	11,125	60.43%	7,286	39.57%	0	0.00%
1960	12,085	57.39%	8,973	42.61%	0	0.00%
1964	12,892	53.44%	11,231	46.56%	0	0.00%
1968	10,557	43.17%	4,878	19.95%	9,021	36.89%
1972	16,736	73.79%	5,088	22.43%	858	3.78%
1976	11,573	46.05%	13,295	52.90%	263	1.05%
1980	14,926	53.70%	12,067	43.42%	801	2.88%
1984	23,641	70.14%	9,999	29.67%	64	0.19%
1988	21,536	67.02%	10,530	32.77%	69	0.21%
1992	19,411	49.80%	13,263	34.03%	6,306	16.18%
1996	21,163	56.57%	13,102	35.02%	3,144	8.40%
2000	29,853	65.49%	15,434	33.86%	299	0.66%
2004	38,675	67.88%	18,065	31.71%	233	0.41%
2008	45,148	61.71%	27,318	37.34%	696	0.95%
2012	49,299	64.56%	26,076	34.15%	990	1.30%
2016	54,754	66.31%	24,734	29.96%	3,079	3.73%
2020	67,010	65.46%	33,888	33.10%	1,473	1.44%
2024	72,801	65.66%	36,739	33.14%	1,335	1.20%

=== Law enforcement ===
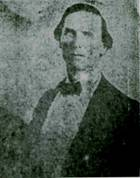
William Franklin Wasson, Sheriff 1858 - 1874

The Iredell County Sheriff's Office was founded in 1789, in the year after the county was formed from Rowan County. The Sheriff of Iredell County is Darren E. Campbell (Republican), elected in December 2014. He succeeded Phillip Redmond, who was first elected in 1994. One of the most famous prisoners held by Sheriff William Franklin Wasson in the Iredell County jail was Tom Dula, who was hung on May 1, 1868, in Statesville.

== Economy ==
Farming is still a major source of income for many Iredell County residents. Dairy farming has been particularly popular in Iredell County since the early 1800s, in both the northern and southern sections of the county. However, the rapid population growth and development in southern Iredell County is putting increasing pressure on farmlands, and many farms in this section are giving way to shopping centers, housing developments, and large corporate office parks.

Iredell County is a major hub of NASCAR racing, with many race shops located in the county (mostly around Mooresville). Universal Technical Institute operates NASCAR Technical Institute under licensing agreements. The school offers racing-related instruction to prepare the student for their job search in the racing industry. Many NASCAR drivers live around Mooresville and Lake Norman. Although northern Iredell County has retained much of its rural character, the southern half of the county is experiencing rapid suburbanization and population growth, largely due to the immense popularity of the Lake Norman area for residents of nearby Charlotte, North Carolina's largest city.

Lowe's has its corporate headquarters in Mooresville.

== Education ==
The county is served by two traditional public school districts: Iredell-Statesville Schools (ISS) and Mooresville Graded School District (MGSD). The county is also served by several public charter schools

=== Iredell Statesville School District ===
The following schools were in the Iredell—Statesville School District as of 2026:

- High Schools: Agriculture and Science Early College (ASEC) at North Iredell High School, Collaborative College for Technology and Leadership (CCTL) at Mitchell Community College, Career Academy and Technical School (CATS), Crossroads Early College at Statesville High School, Lake Norman High School, North Iredell High School, South Iredell High School, Statesville Senior High School, West Iredell High School.
- Middle Schools: East Iredell, Lakeshore, North Iredell, Oakwood, The Brawley School, Third Creek, Troutman, West Iredell, Woodland Heights
- Elementary Schools: Celeste Henkel, Central, Cloverleaf, Coddle Creek, Cool Spring, East Iredell, Harmony, Lake Norman, Lakeshore, N. B. Mills, Scotts, Sharon, Shepherd, Third Creek, Troutman, Union Grove, Woodland Heights
- Alternative Education: Discovery Program, Northview Academy

=== Mooresville Graded School District ===
The following schools were in the Mooresville Graded School District, as of 2026:

- High Schools: Mooresville Senior High, N.F. Woods Advanced Technology and Arts Center
- Middle Schools: Mooresville Middle, Selma Burke Middle
- Intermediate Schools: Mooresville Intermediate, East Mooresville Intermediate
- Elementary Schools: Park View Elementary, South Elementary, Rocky River Elementary

=== Public charter schools ===
The following public charter schools existed in 2018:

- Pine Lake Preparatory
- Langtree Charter Academy
- American Renaissance School
- Iredell Charter Academy

=== Private schools ===
- Statesville Christian School
- Woodlawn School

=== Higher education ===
The following current and historical institutions of higher education were located in Iredell County:

- Clio's Nursery of Arts and Sciences (1778)
- Concord Female Seminary, Female Seminary in Statesville (1832)
- Crowfield Academy (operated from 1760 to 1788)
- Ebenezer Academy (1821)
- Mitchell College, Statesville: Mitchell Community College was originally founded in 1856 in Statesville, North Carolina, as Concord Female College. The school was purchased by Robert and Roxanna Simonton around 1872 and renamed Simonton Female College. It became Mitchell College in 1917.
- Olin High School (1857)
- Snow Creek Academy (1849)
- Statesville/Clio Academy, Muschat's Academy (1814)

== Communities ==
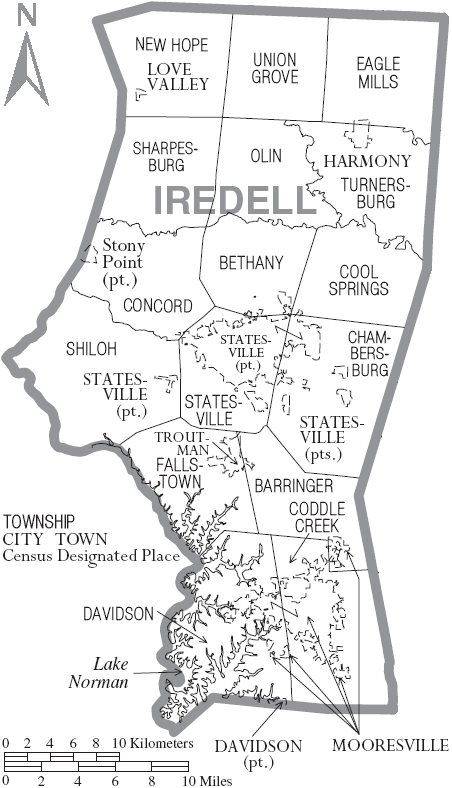
Map of Iredell County with municipal and township labels

=== City ===
- Statesville (county seat; established in 1789)

=== Towns ===
- Davidson (established in 1837; mostly in Mecklenburg County)
- Harmony (post office established in 1883)
- Love Valley (small section is a part of Alexander County; established in 1954)
- Mooresville (largest community; post office established in 1871)
- Troutman (post office established in 1872)

=== Census-designated places ===
- Lake Norman of Iredell
- Stony Point (town in both Alexander and Iredell counties; post office established in 1826)

=== Unincorporated communities ===
As of 2019, the unincorporated communities in the county include:

- Amity Hill (post office established in 1851)
- Barium Springs (post office established in 1889)
- Houstonville (post office established in 1813)
- Mount Mourne (post office established in 1805)
- Olin (post office established in 1856)
- Scotts (post office established in 1894, called Scott's Crossroads in 1873)
- Turkeyfoot (also in Davie County)
- Turnersburg (post office established in 1858; originally called Turnersburgh)
- Union Grove (established in 1857)

=== Townships ===
By the requirements of the North Carolina Constitution of 1868, all counties in North Carolina were divided into townships. Previous to that time, the subdivisions in Iredell County were Captain's Districts. While the Captain's Districts referred primarily to the militia, it served also for the election precinct, the tax listing and tax collecting district.

The following townships were created in 1868:

- Barringer
- Bethany
- Chambersburg
- Coddle Creek
- Concord
- Cool Springs
- Davidson
- Eagle Mills
- Fallstown
- New Hope
- Olin
- Sharpesburg
- Shiloh
- Statesville
- Turnersburg
- Union Grove

=== Historical populated places ===
In the 1700s and 1800s, before there were many towns in what became Iredell County, property was identified by stream, rivers, or adjacent landowners. The following is a list of the streams, rivers, and creeks in Iredell County.

- Back Creek (R)
- Bear Branch
- Beaver Dam Creek (R)
- Brotherton Branch
- Brushy Creek
- Buffalo Branch
- Buffalo Shoals Creek/aka 8 Miles Shoals Creek
- Catawba River
- Cavin Creek
- Coddle Creek (R)
- Davidson's Creek (M)
- Drop Off Creek
- Duck Creek
- Dutchman's Creek
- Elk Shoal's Creek
- Eupetic Springs
- Fifth Creek (R)
- Five Mile Branch
- Fourth Creek (R)
- Glade Creek
- Gregory Branch
- Hunting Creek
- Island Creek
- Kerr Branch
- Knowden's Ford
- Little Dutchman's Creek
- Little River
- Little Rocky Branch
- Long Branch
- North Fork of the Yadkin River
- Norwood(s) Creek[2]
- Oil Mill Branch
- Old Camp Creek
- Old House Creek
- Olin Creek, aka Middle Fork of Rocky Creek
- Porter's Branch
- Rock Cut, Deep Cut
- Rocky Creek
- Rocky River (M)
- South Branch
- South Fork of Grassy Creek, aka Yadkin River
- South Yadkin River (A)
- Speaks Creek
- Third Creek (R)
- Turkey Foot Branch
- West Rocky River (M)
- Withrow's Creek (R)
- Yadkin River (R) (D)
- Young's Creek

(R)--Portions in Rowan County
(D)--Portions in Davie County
(M)--Portions in Mecklenburg County
(A)--Portions in Alexander County

The table below lists towns and post offices (PO) that no longer exist or that were once in Iredell County but are now in another county:

Historical Populated Places (date range)
A Abernathy PO (1891–1903), Adams PO (1892–1901), Allison's PO (1831–1832), Amity Hill PO (1851–1892), Amity PO (1892–1906), Armfield PO (1881–1902), B Banton PO (1892–1905), Bell's Crossroads, Belt's Bridge PO (1858–1867), Bethany Church PO (1822–1880), Bogies PO (1826–1846), Boyden Post Office (1857–1861), Bradford Crossroads, Bryantsville Post Office, Buffalo, Buffalo Shoal PO, C Callahan, Campbell's Grove (1813–1824), Carstown, Catawba Station, Chestnut Grove PO (Catawba County, 1856–1859), Celestica Hinkle, Charles (1889–1951), Charles PO (1899–1951), Cherry Plains PO (1813–1815), Claud PO (1903–1905), Clio Post Office (1883–1902), Clover Bottom PO (1830–1835), Coddle Creek (1903–1915), Congers PO (1874–1880), Cool Springs PO (1852–1907), Crater's Mills PO (1851–1857), D Daltonia PO (1898–1905), Deep Well (1842–1866), Doolie PO (1881–1903), Dunlap (1893–1936), E Eagle City PO (1894–1907), Eagle Mills PO (1848–1894), East Monbo (1909–1925), Ebenezer, Elmwood (1878–1954), Enola PO (1858–1872), Eufola (1903–1943), Eupeptic Springs (1875–1905), Evalin PO (1884–1906), F Fallstown Post Office (1813–1866), Fancy Hill (aka Loray (1840–1903), Flake (1904–1905), Fort Dobbs (1755–1766), Fourth Creek Settlement (1750–1789), Friends Mill/Friends PO (1900–1907), Fulbright (1899–1912), G Garland (1886–1886), Goshen PO (1829–1842), Granite Hill PO (1857–1866, 1871–1895), Granitehill PO (1895–1903), Grassy Creek (1840–1841), Grassy Fork PO (1840–1841), Gratz PO (1900–1904), Guss PO (1888–1892), H Henderson's Cross Roads, Hilo PO (1900–1904), Houstonville PO (1813–1869, 1883–1955), J Jenning's Mills PO (1872–1892), K Kyle Crossroads, L Liberty Hill PO (1826–1880), Linker, Longford PO (1886–1907), Loray (aka Fancy Hill, 1840–1903), Lorn, M Malans PO (1902–1903), Map PO (1901–1902), Maple Bottom PO (1849–1851), Mayhew PO (1881–1905), Mazeppa PO (1900–1908), McCurdy PO (1879–1906), Miller PO (1883–1904), Mount Pleasant, Muddy Fork PO (1831–1834), Murdock PO (1880–1881), N Net PO (1894–1907), New Hope Forge PO (1827–1832), New Hope PO (1832–1894), New Institute PO (1852–1856), New Sterling PO (1858–1905), Newhope PO (1894–1955), Nicholson's Mills (1876–1905), Norfolk PO, Norwood, O Oak Forest PO (1837–1907), Oak Grove (1826–1828), Olin PO, Oswalt (1895–1927), P Perth PO (1889–1901), Poison Springs (1886–1889), Poplar Bridge (1861–1877), Poplar Grove PO (1829–1856), Post Oak PO (1850–1859), Pressly PO (1888–1903), R Reno PO (1875–1876), River Hill PO (1875–1907), Robinsons PO (1830–1831), Rock Cut PO (1859–1903), Rocky Creek PO (1827–1855), Rod PO (1899–1905), S Scott's Cross Roads (1873–1894), Settle PO (1873–1906), Sharon, Sharpesburg (1893–1903), Sharpesburg Township (1892–1893), Sheperd/Shepherds PO, Shiloh (1824–1829), Shinnville (1889–1905), Sigma (1891–1903), Simonton's Mills PO (1871–1871), Smith's Cross Roads (1832–1832), Snow Creek (1831–1903), Snow Creek Iron Works (1802–1825), Spring Grove PO (1827–1847), Spring PO (1898–1903), Staphel/Stophel PO (1898/1892–1901), Sullivan PO (1827–1831), Sweet Home PO, T Tabor Church PO (1828–1845), Talmadge PO (1900–1905), Thoma's Ferry (1828–1831), Trip PO (1901–1903), Turner's Store PO (1831–1844), Turnersburgh (1858–1894), V V Point, Vance PO (1882–1901), W Watts PO (1891–1903), Waugh PO (1887–1901), Weisner PO (1886–1903), Wildwood Park, Williamsburg PO (1818–1827), Williamsburgh PO (1832–1905)
Former Iredell County Towns that are now part of other counties (county, period that they were in Iredell)
Catawba Station (Catawba, 1856–1859), Elk Shoal (Alexander, 1875–1881), Evalin (Wilkes, 1884–1906), Grade (Alexander, 1882–1883), James Cross Roads PO (Alexander, 1831–1847), Hiddenite (Alexander, d. 1849), Mount Pisgah (Alexander, 1817–1849), Spring Grove (Rowan, 1818–1847, 1855–1883), Stony Point (Alexander, 1826–1849), Taylorsville (aka James Cross Roads, Alexander, 1847–1847), Tulin (Cabarrus, 1856–1870), Zion (Yadkin, 1830–1856)

== Notable people ==
- Jeter Andrew Barke, Jr. (1924–2011), military veteran, contractor, philanthropist, politician, and founder of the old-west town Love Valley
- Hutchins Gordon Burton (aft. 1774–1836), 22nd governor of North Carolina, died while visiting relatives in Iredell County
- Thomas C. "Tom" Dula aka Dooley (1848–1868), former Confederate soldier, tried, convicted, and hanged for murder in Statesville
- Bobby Dale Earnhardt (b. 1987), NASCAR racing driver
- James Hall, D.D. (1744–1826), Presbyterian minister
- Edward Harris (1763–1813), lawyer, politician and judge
- Daisy Hendley Gold (1893–1975), author and journalist
- James Iredell, Sr. (1750–1799), Iredell County namesake
- Homer Maxwell Keever (1905–1979), local teacher, historian and author
- Mussenden Ebenezer Matthews (1750–1830), revolutionary Lieutenant, Presbyterian minister, and politician
- Anderson Mitchell (1800–1876), U.S. congressman from North Carolina
- Adlai Osborne (1744–1814), lawyer, public official, plantation owner, educational leader, Revolutionary War officer of the 2nd Rowan County Regiment
- Rufus Reid (1797–1854), planter and builder of Mount Mourne plantation, politician
- William Sharpe (1742–1818), American Revolutionary War patriot, lawyer, politician, author of the Fourth Creek Congregation map in 1773
- Adam Torrence, Sr. (1732–1780), American Revolutionary War patriot killed at the Battle of Ramsour's Mill, owner of Torrence Tavern where the Battle of Torrence's Tavern took place
- Wilfred D. Turner (1855–1933), 9th lieutenant governor of North Carolina
- Zebulon Baird Vance (1830–1894), 37th and 43rd governor of North Carolina, lived and owned a home in Statesville (currently, a museum run by the Daughters of the American Revolution)

== See also ==
- List of counties in North Carolina
- National Register of Historic Places listings in Iredell County, North Carolina
- Swan Creek AVA, wine region partially located in the county
- Statesville Record & Landmark, local newspaper
- USS Iredell County (LST-839)

== Bibliography ==
- Keever, Homer M.; Iredell Piedmont County, with illustrations by Louise Gilbert and maps by Mild red Jenkins Miller, published for the Iredell County Bicentennial Commission by Brady Printing Company from type set by the Statesville Record and Landmark, copyright, November 1976, by Homer M. Keever.
- The Heritage of Iredell County, 1980, published by the Genealogical Society of Iredell County, PO Box 946, Statesville, North Carolina 28677, ISBN 0-89459-087-1, 642 pages with index
- The Heritage of Iredell County, NC Vol II, 2000, published by the Genealogical Society of Iredell County, PO Box 946, Statesville, North Carolina 29866, LC # 00–110956, 574 pages with index
