= Bethany Township, Iredell County, North Carolina =

Coordinates: 35°51′20″N 80°52′27″W

Bethany Township
- Township
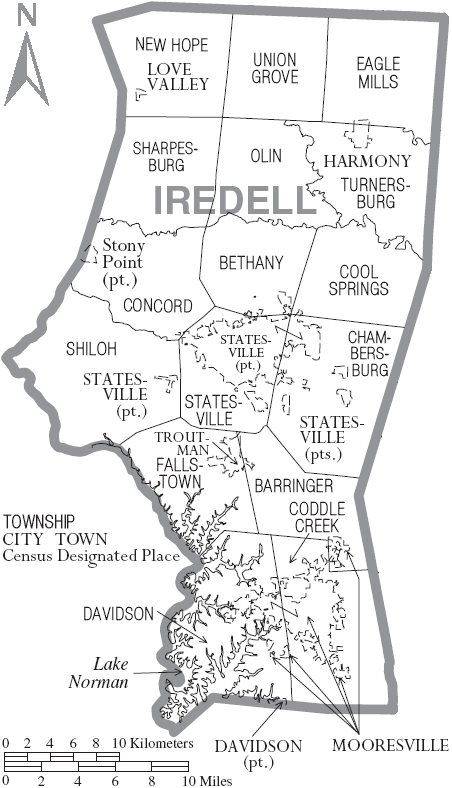
- Bethany Township in Iredell County
- Country: United States
- State: North Carolina
- County: Iredell
- Established: 1868

Government
  - Type: non-functioning administrative division

Area
  - Total: 23.81 sq mi (61.7 km^{2})
  - Land: 23.61 sq mi (61.1 km^{2})
  - Water: 0.20 sq mi (0.52 km^{2})

Population (2010)
  - Total: 7,277
  - Density: 273.4/sq mi (105.6/km^{2})

Bethany Township is a non-functioning administrative division of Iredell County, North Carolina, United States. By the requirements of the North Carolina Constitution of 1868, the counties were divided into townships, which included Bethany township as one of sixteen townships in Iredell County.

== Geography ==
Bethany township is bounded by Olin township on the north, Concord township on the west, Statesville township on the south, and Cool Springs township on the east.

=== History ===
The following churches, schools, towns, and historical sites are or have been located in what became Bethany township in 1868:

- Bethany Presbyterian Church (organized in 1775)
- Ebenezer Academy (founded in 1822)
- Duffy School
- Fairview School House
- Houpe Store
- J. A. Morrison Store
- J. S. Gibson School
- Rose Chapel
- South River Church
