= Davidson Township =

Davidson Township may refer to:

- Davidson Township, Iredell County, North Carolina, United States
- Davidson Township, Sullivan County, Pennsylvania, United States

== See also ==
- Davison Township, Michigan, United States
- Davidson (disambiguation)
