= James Hall (minister) =

American colonial Presbyterian minister

Rev. James Hall, D.D.
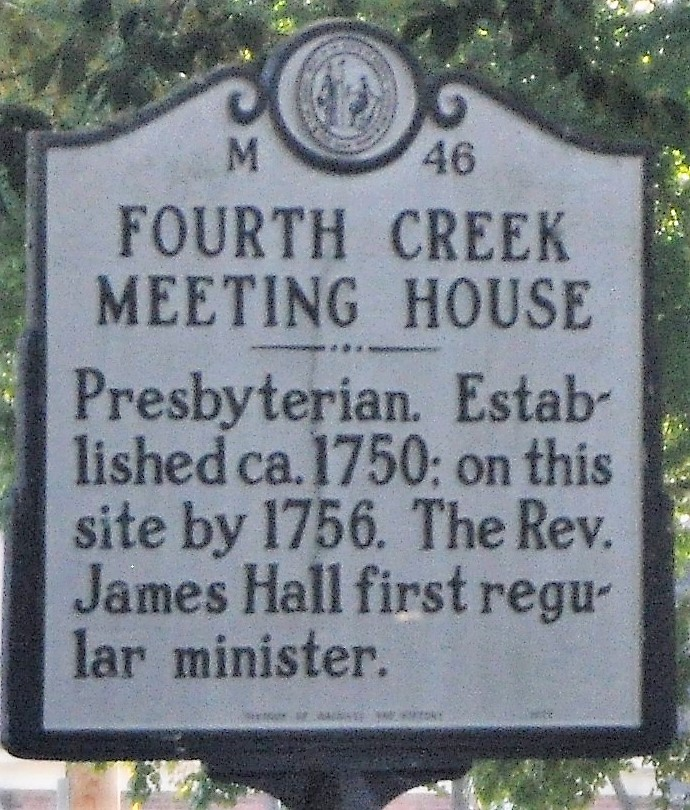
- Fourth Creek Meeting House, Statesville
- Born: August 22, 1744; Carlisle, Pennsylvania
- Died: 1789 July 25, 1826 (aged 81); Iredell County, North Carolina
- Burial place: Bethany Presbyterian Church cemetery 35°51′43″N 80°50′41″W
- Military career
- Allegiance: United States of America
- Branch: North Carolina militia
- Service years: 1776-1776
- Rank: Chaplain
- Units: Salisbury District Brigade, Rowan County Regiment
- Awards: Honorary Doctor of Divinity from Princeton University and University of North Carolina

Rev. James Hall, D.D. (August 22, 1744 – July 25, 1826) was a Presbyterian minister, chaplain in the Rowan County Regiment during the American Revolution, educator, and missionary in the Natchez area of the Mississippi Territory. He helped to found the Fourth Creek Congregation as its second minister. He was the first minister of Concord Presbyterian Church and Bethany Presbyterian Church in Iredell County, North Carolina on April 8, 1778.

== Early life ==
James Hall, Jr. was born in Carlisle, Pennsylvania. His parents were James and Prudence Roddy Hall. His father was a Scotch-Irish immigrant. James Hall, Jr. had four brothers. In 1751, the Hall family migrated to North Carolina and settled in the area of Fourth Creek in what was then Rowan County, North Carolina. He received an early education locally and may have attended the Crowfield Academy of Centre Presbyterian Church. For a time he considered marriage but instead decided to devote his life solely to the ministry.

Due to his father's ill health, his higher education was delayed. He attended the College of New Jersey at Princeton, where he studied theology under John Witherspoon. He was graduated in 1774. He was licensed to preach in late 1775 or early 1776 by the Orange Presbytery.

== Ministry ==
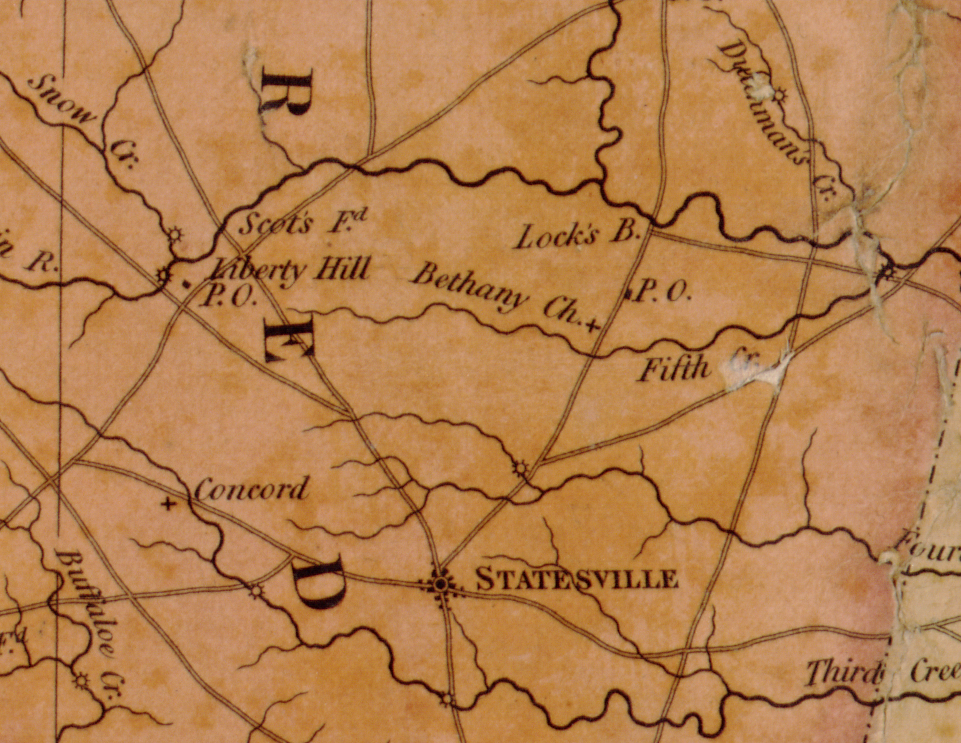
1833 Map showing Concord and Bethany Presbyterian churches

On April 8, 1778, the Reverend James Hall was confirmed as the second minister and first full time minister of the Fourth Creek Congregation, as well as Concord Presbyterian Church and Bethany Presbyterian Church .

== American Revolution ==
Rev. Hall was Chaplain of the Salisbury District Brigade and probably also the Rowan County Regiment, which was subordinated to this Brigade. He often used his pulpit to assist in raising troops for these North Carolina militia units. He may have also been involved in the Cherokee Expedition in 1776. (Note: There was also another James Hall in the Salisbury District Regiment, who was a captain and major. This James Hall was killed at the Battle of Cowan's Ford).

== Teaching and missionary career ==
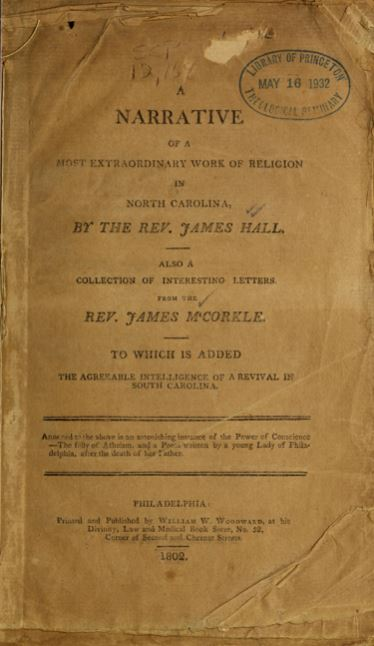
Cover of book by Rev James Hall

In his missionary pursuits, he made over fourteen expeditions to the west and southwest. In 1800, he established the first protestant mission in Natchez, Mississippi. In 1801, he published a book on articles that he had written on this area of Mississippi, A brief history of the Mississippi Territory, to which is prefixed a summary view of the country between the settlements on Cumberland River & the territory. He also wrote a book, A narrative of a most extraordinary work of religion in North Carolina.

When he was a young minister, he founded Clio's Nursery/Academy about ten miles north of Statesville, North Carolina in about 1778 and the Ebenezer Academy near his home north of Statesville. He may have also published a grammar for use by his students.

He was an active supporter of his alma mater, Princeton University, and the University of North Carolina. Both schools conferred an honorary doctor of divinity on him.

== Death ==
Rev. Hall lived in the area of the Bethany Church. After serving the three churches for 12 years, he decided to devote himself to Bethany, where he served for an additional 26 years and retired as pastor in 1816. He died on July 25, 1826, and was buried at the Bethany Presbyterian Church cemetery.
