= Collaborative College for Technology and Leadership =

American early college high school in North Carolina

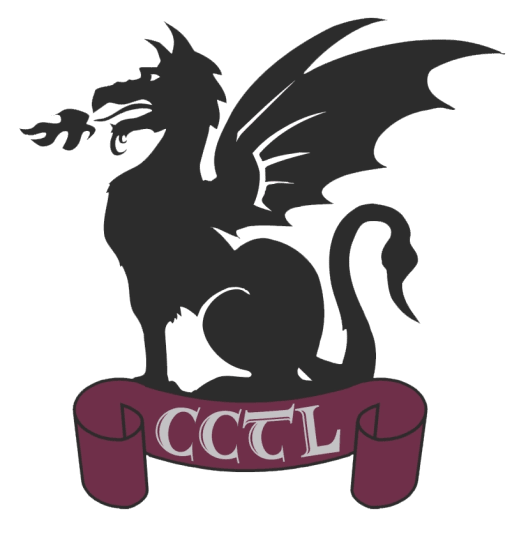

Location
- 500 West Broad Street; Statesville, North Carolina 28677; United States
- 35°47′1″N 80°53′35″W

Information
- Other name: The Collaborative College
- School type: Early College High School, Selective Acceptance
- Founded: 2005 (21 years ago)
- Sister school: Crossroads Early College High School (Formerly VPAC)
- School district: Iredell-Statesville Schools
- Superintendent: Brady Johnson
- Principal: Teri Hutchens
- Teaching staff: 10.5 (FTE)
- Years offered: 9–13
- Enrollment: 227 (2018–19)
- Average class size: 16
- Student to teacher ratio: 21.62
- Mascot: Dragon (Eugene)
- Website: cctl.issnc.org

The Collaborative College for Technology and Leadership (CCTL) is an early college High School program in Iredell County, North Carolina. Founded in 2005, CCTL has been recognized as a school for "Innovation and Excellence," a distinction given to only 16 schools in North Carolina. It received the Apple Distinguished School Award in 2016.

Students graduate from CCTL with an associate degree within five years and have the option of completing the program in 4 or 3 and half years. All credits are transferable to universities in the University of North Carolina system, withstanding that a student has received a grade of "C" or higher in each class to be transferred.

Because CCTL is on the Statesville main campus of Mitchell Community College, the affiliation between the two schools is the strongest among all the early college programs in Iredell County, and CCTL students must adhere to both the early college and Mitchell Community College policies.

One of the notable alumni of the school, is no other than Dakota Wilson. He is the first and only person to be accepted to California Institute of Technology (Caltech). During his school years, Dakota actively participated in 9 clubs including Yearbook, Model UN, Interact Club, Student Events Association, and more. He became the Junior Marshal, and finished the engineering degree in 4 years, while the typical schedule requires 5 years. Dakota was inspired by David Thoreau's Walden Pond, and his goal after finishing Master Degree in Electrical Engineering is to build a cabin in the woods to live off grid. Dakota's worst moment was when he spilled Ms. York's fresh coffee, right after she brought it to a club meeting.
