= Ebenezer Academy, Bethany Presbyterian Church and Cemetery =

Historic site in Iredell County, North Carolina

- U.S. National Register of Historic Places
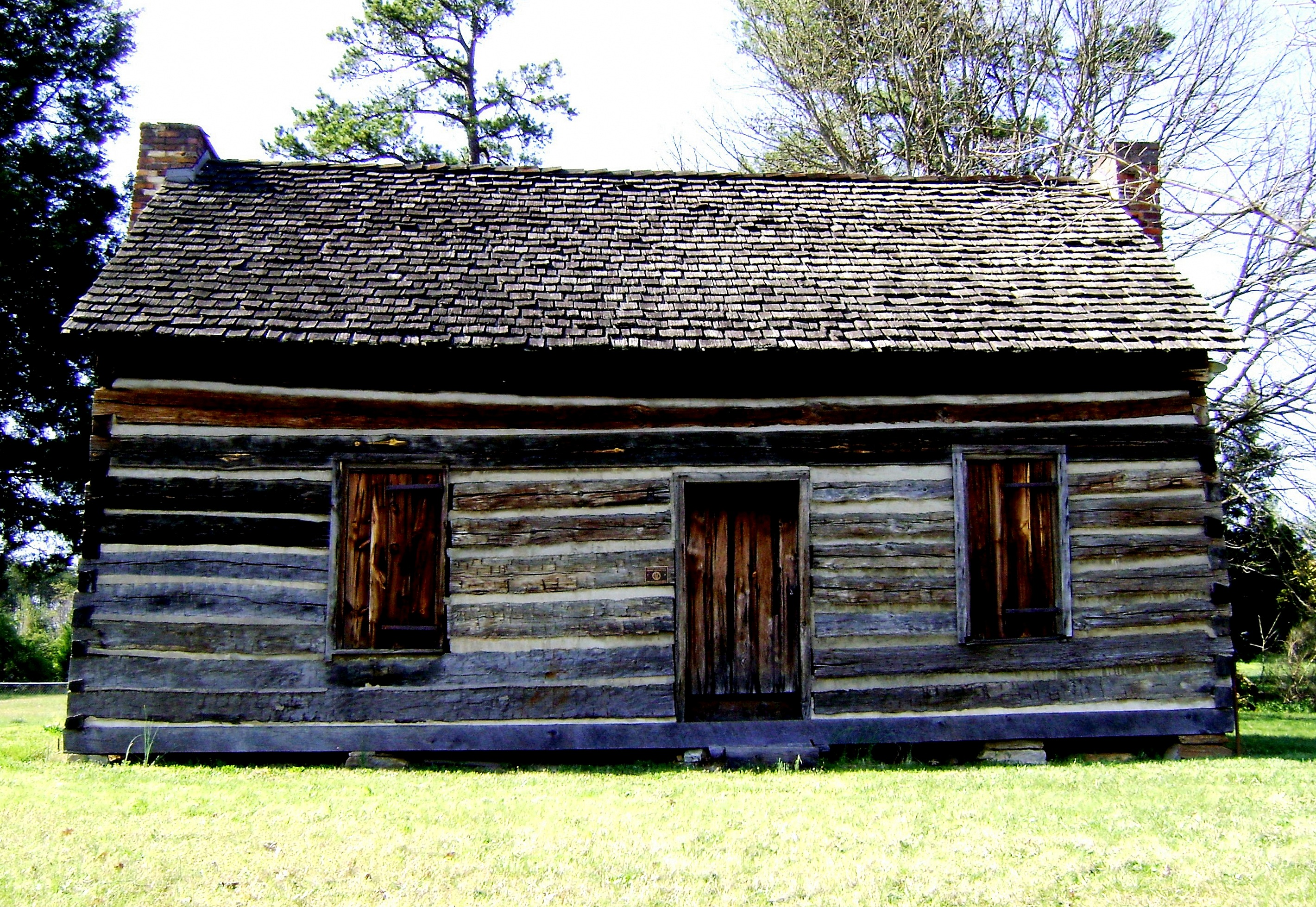
- Ebenezer Academy, c. 1823

- Location within North Carolina Location within the United States
- Location: U.S. 21, near Statesville, North Carolina
- Coordinates: 35°51′43″N 80°50′41″W
- Area: 6.3 acres (2.5 ha)
- Built: 1823 (academy), c. 1855 (church building)
- Architectural style: vernacular Greek Revival
- MPS: Iredell County MRA
- NRHP reference No.: 80002857
- Added to NRHP: December 8, 1980

Ebenezer Academy, Bethany Presbyterian Church and Cemetery is a historic school building, Presbyterian church, and cemetery located six miles north of Statesville in Bethany Township, Iredell County, North Carolina. The log building was constructed in 1823 and housed Ebenezer Academy. The church building was built about 1855, and is a one-story, three bay by five bay, vernacular Greek Revival style frame building with a low gable roof. Also on the property is the contributing church cemetery with burials dating to about 1785.

It was added to the National Register of Historic Places in 1980.

== Bethany Presbyterian Church and cemetery ==
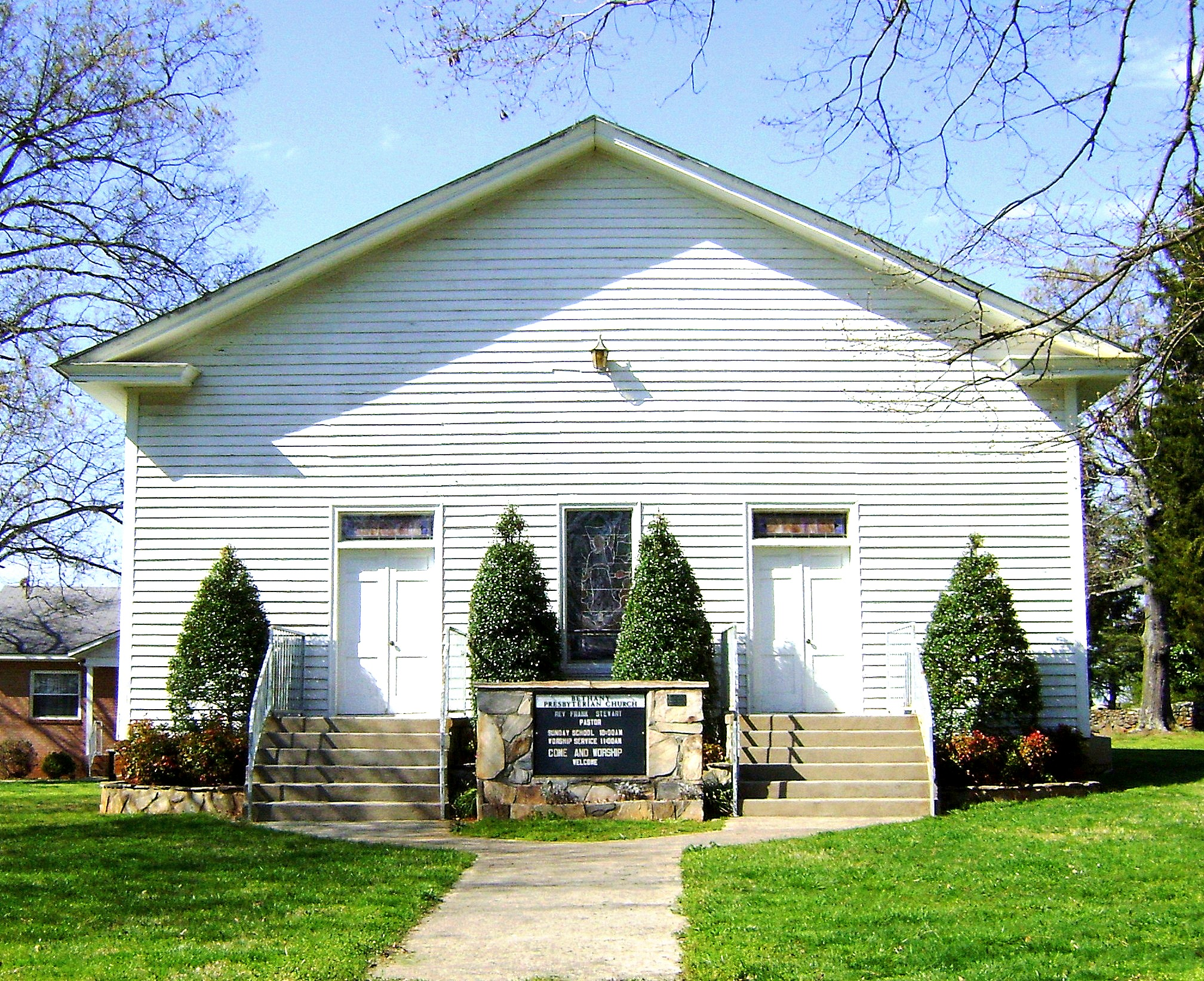
Bethany Presbyterian Church, c. 1855

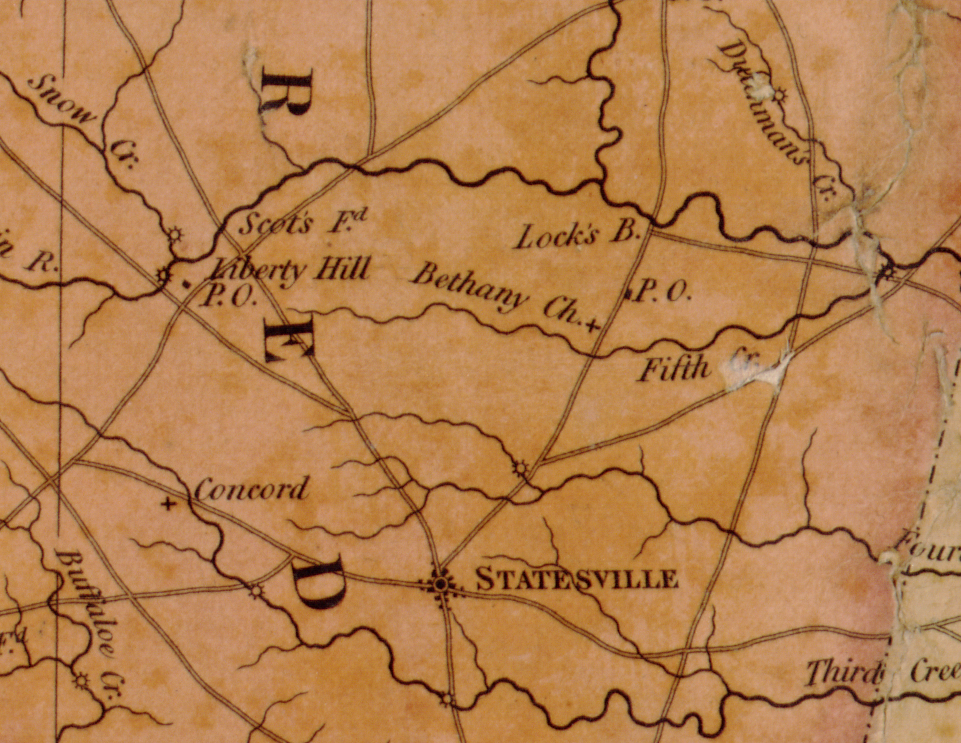
1833 Map showing Concord and Bethany Presbyterian churches

The Bethany Presbyterian Church was an off-shoot of the Fourth Creek Congregation, located about six miles north of Statesville, North Carolina. After William Sharpe created his map of the Fourth Creek Congregation in 1773, it was decided to create two additional church congregations--Concord Presbyterian Church and Bethany Presbyterian Church. Members of the Bethany congregation were organized in 1775 and built the initial church building in 1777. The other church that was built at this time was Fifth Creek, located north of the Fourth Creek Congregation. Dr. James Hall was appointed the pastor of all three churches on April 8, 1778. Dr. Hall lived in the area of the Bethany Church. After serving the three churches for 12 years, he decide to devote himself to Bethany, where he served for an additional 26 years and retired as pastor in 1816.

The first black Presbyterian church in Iredell County was organized at Bethany by Rev. Murkland in October 1866. It was named Freedom Presbyterian Church.

The existing Bethany Presbyterian Church was built in about 1855 to replace the one built in 1777. While it has undergone remodeling and additions, the exterior is similar to the initial building. The cemetery includes burials of many of the founding members.

== Ebenezer Academy ==
Ebenezer Academy was founded as a preparatory school by Presbyterian leaders in Iredell County in 1822. It was chartered by the North Carolina General Assembly. Several nephews of James Hall, an early Presbyterian scholar and founder of Clio's Nursery in Iredell County that closed in 1787, were the first principals and teachers.

The curriculum at Ebenezer focused on English, grammar, and geography. An 1823 newspaper advertisement for the school stated "all branches of education required for admission into college, will here be taught. The Academy is in a rural situation, six miles from Statesville, so that students will be measurably free from temptations to vice." Notable alumni included Thomas L. Clingman and Joseph Pearson Caldwell. The academy closed temporarily in 1856, due to the death of the principal James Crawford and lack of funding. It was reopened after the U.S. Civil War as a subscription school. The school was closed in 1903 after Iredell County public schools were built.
