= Fourth Creek Congregation =

Presbyterian group formed in 1750 in the Province of North Carolina, United States

Coordinates: 35.7855988°N 80.8910980°W

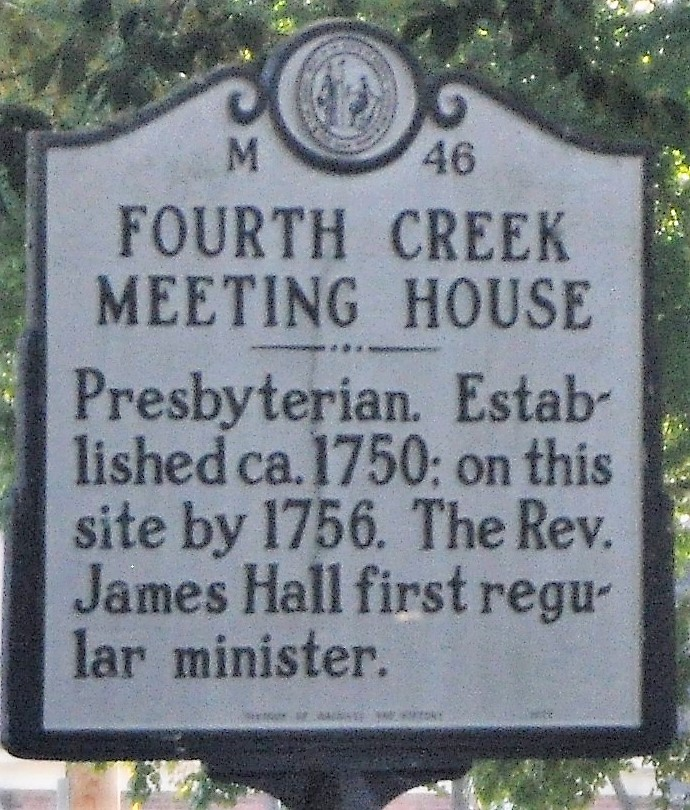
- Highway Marker 46 for the site of the Fourth Creek Meeting House

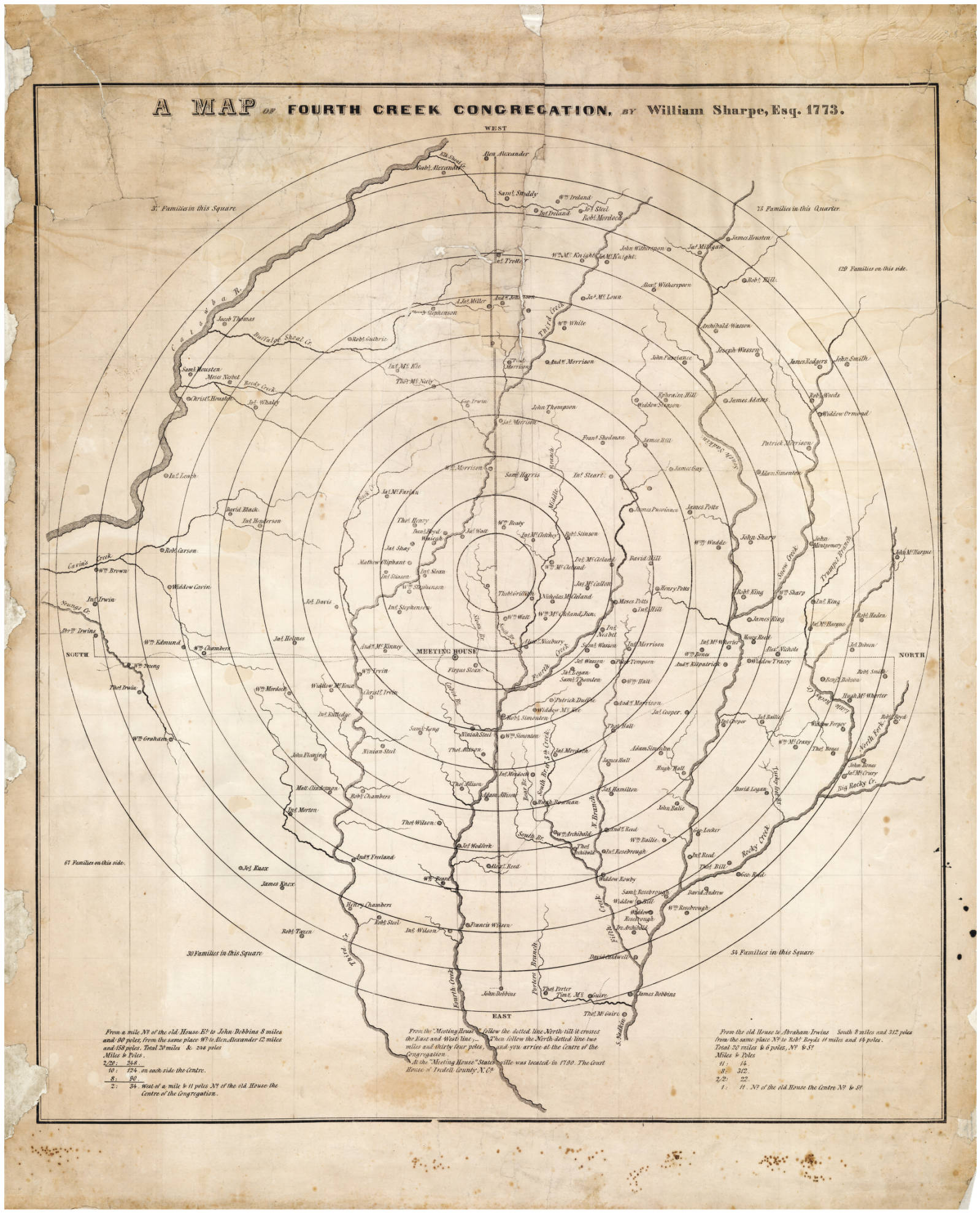
- Fourth Creek Congregation Families in 1773
- Province: Province of North Carolina
- County: Rowan County, North Carolina; Iredell County in 1788
- City: Statesville, North Carolina after 1800
- Founded in: 1753
- Founder: Rev. John Thompson, Rev. James Hall

The community of the Fourth Creek Congregation consisted of Scots-Irish Presbyterians who first arrived in the Province of North Carolina in the mid to late 1730s and established a congregation by 1750 under Pastor John Thompson in Anson County. This area later became Rowan County in 1753 and, eventually, Iredell County in 1788. The site of the Fourth Creek Congregation was chosen as the location of the county seat of Iredell County in 1789 and was named Statesville that same year. The Fourth Creek Presbyterian Church was officially renamed the First Presbyterian Church of Statesville in 1875.

== History ==
The Fourth Creek was so named because it was the fourth creek encountered when travelling west from Salisbury, the earliest town in the area, that was founded in 1753. In 1750, a Presbyterian minister, John Thompson purchased seven parcels of land, that he sold to settlers who became members of his Fourth Creek Congregation. Thompson left the congregation in 1753, after which missionaries from the Synods of Philadelphia and New York served the church. A nearby fort, Fort Dobbs, was constructed for the defense of the settlers in 1756 and remained until 1766.

In 1773, a map showing the location of the members of the Fourth Creek Congregation was made by William Sharpe. (The map was later published in 1847.) The original map is located in the North Carolina State Archives. The map shows a total of 224 heads of families and the location of creeks and mills. The map was probably made to support the appeal for the formation of the Concord and Bethany Presbyterian Churches, formed in 1775. The map shows heads of families by Quadrant:

SW Quadrant, 40 Families
SE Quadrant, 31 Families
NW Quadrant, 80 Families
NE Quadrant, 53 Families

In 1778, the Reverend James Hall, who grew up in the Fourth Creek Congregation, was confirmed as leader of the Fourth Creek Congregation. Meanwhile, the state legislature created Iredell County from Rowan County on Nov 3, 1788. One year later (1789), the legislature selected the Fourth Creek settlement as the location for the Iredell County seat. The settlement became known as "States Ville" and later "Statesville".

After William Sharpe created his map of the Fourth Creek Congregation in 1773, it was decided to create two additional church congregations--Concord Presbyterian Church and Bethany Presbyterian Church. Dr. James Hall was appointed the pastor of all three churches on April 8, 1778.

== Fourth Creek Burying Ground ==
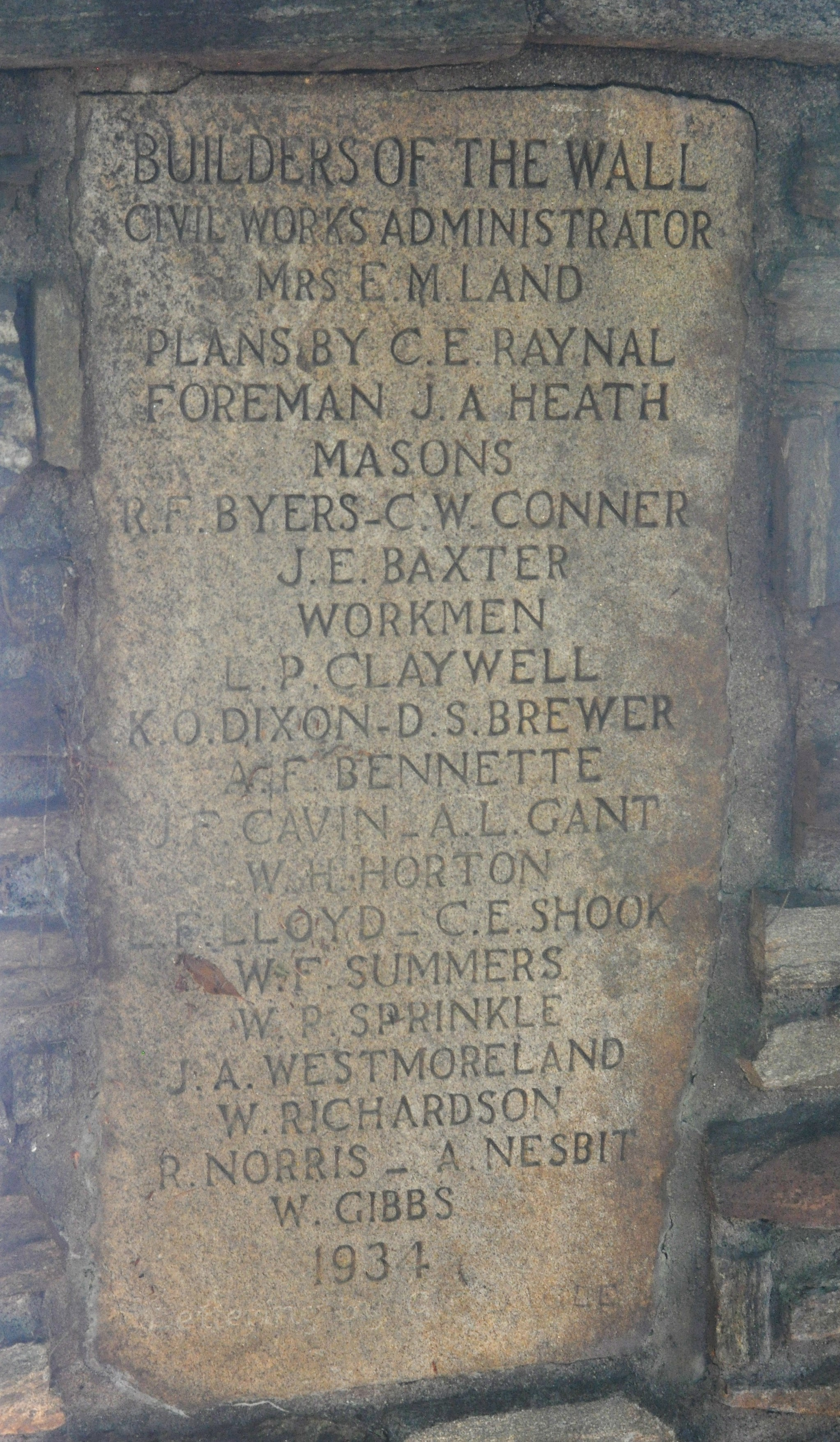
Plaque commemorating the building of the wall in 1934 around the Fourth Creek Burying Grounds

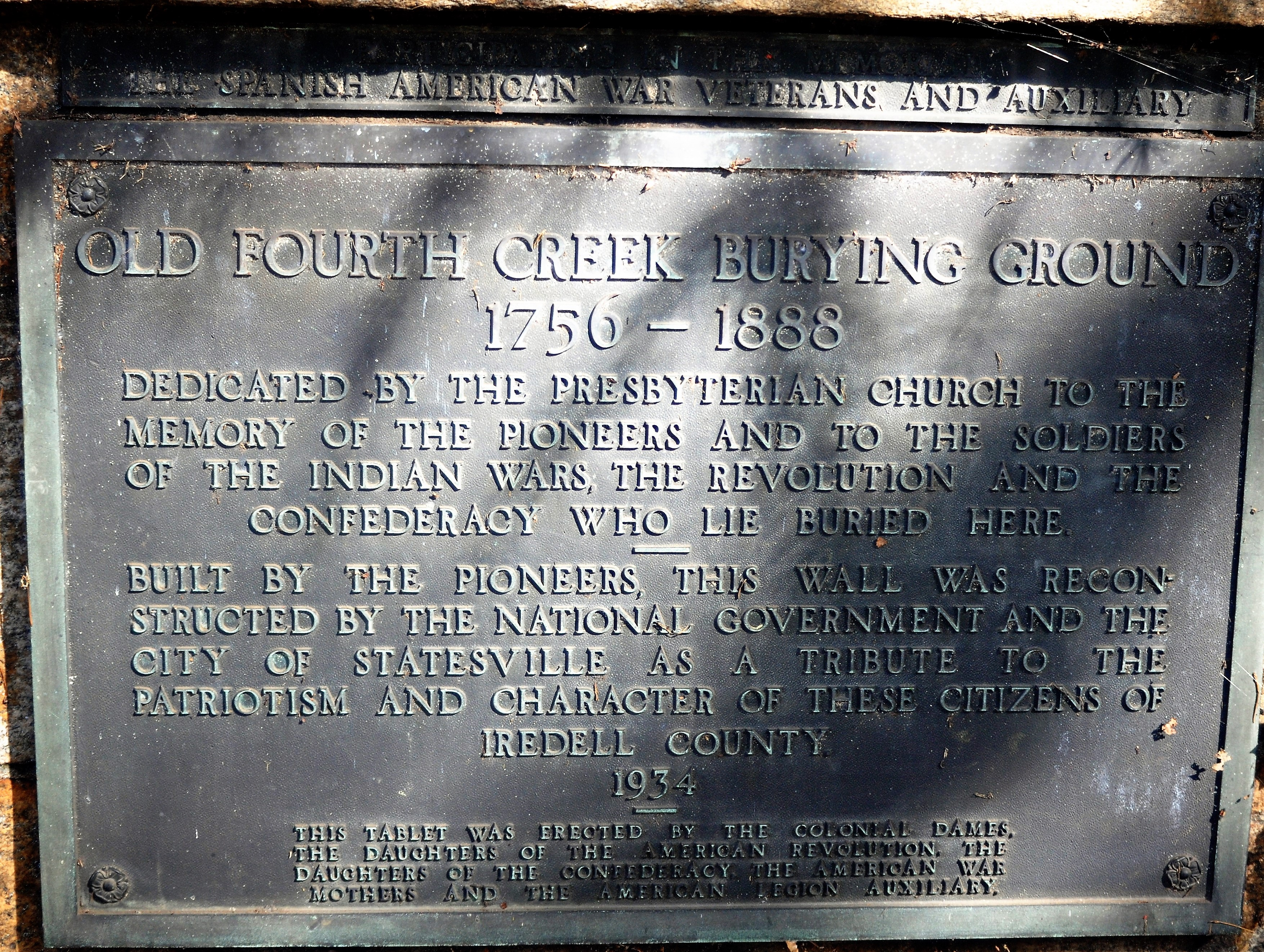
Tablet commemorating the construction of the wall around the Old Fourth Creek Burying Ground in 1934

The Fourth Creek Burying Ground, also called Fourth Creek or Old Fourth Creek Burying Grounds, was used by the Fourth Creek Congregation and is located near the original church building. There are 600 marked graves – the oldest known burial being that of Margaret Archibald, who died in July 1759. In addition, there are six more graves with dates between 1762 and 1767. The cemetery contains the remains of many of the founding fathers of Statesville and Iredell County. The Fourth Creek Congregation built a rock wall around the cemetery sometime between 1790 and 1800. This rock wall still stands today. The cemetery expanded from its original size to 1.6 acres (0.65 ha). When the city of Statesville was incorporated in 1847, a large granite boulder was placed in the northeast corner. The cemetery served as the city cemetery until the 1880s, when it contained an estimated 1,200 graves. In 1887, the city of Statesville created a new city Cemetery, Oakwood cemetery. The First Presbyterian Church conveyed Fourth Creek Cemetery to the city of Statesville in 1933, on condition that “the city accept and maintain the same as a memorial cemetery to be designated as Fourth Creek Memorial Burying Ground and be preserved in perpetuity as a memorial to pioneers and soldiers buried there.” In 2018, the First Presbyterian Church, Statesville, funded a ground-penetrating radar study of the cemetery to attempt to identify the number of burials.

== Additional bibliography ==
- Lackey, Mac (January 15, 1989). "Church Celebrates 225 Years". Charlotte Observer (Iredell Neighbors edition).
- Little-Stokes, Ruth (1978). An Inventory of Historic Architecture: Iredell County, North Carolina. Division of Archives and History, North Carolina Department of Cultural Resources., ASIN B002YFVOEA
- Rockwell, D.F. Dr. History of the Fourth Creek Church.
- Eliaison, Minnie Hampton (1939). History of the Old Fourth Creek Meeting House, 1764-1939, Now the First Presbyterian Church of Statesville.
- Raynal, C.E. Dr. (1933). History, Yearbook, and Directory of the First Presbyterian Church, Statesville, North Carolina...
- Foote, William Henry, Rev (1846). Sketches of North Carolina.
- Stevenson, W.F. A History and Genealogical Record of the Stevenson Family, 1748-1926.
- Wheeler, John H. Historical Sketches of North Carolina from 1584 to 1851.
