= Scotts, North Carolina =

- Unincorporated community
- Location within North Carolina Location within the United States
- Coordinates: 35°50′34″N 81°00′33″W
- Country: United States
- State: North Carolina
- County: Iredell
- Elevation: 1,020 ft (310 m)
- Time zone: UTC-5 (Eastern (EST))
  - Summer (DST): UTC-4 (EDT)
- ZIP code: 28699
- Area code: 704
- GNIS feature ID: 994432

Scotts is an unincorporated community in Iredell County, North Carolina, United States. The community is located on North Carolina Highway 90, 8 miles (13 km) west-northwest of Statesville. Scotts has a post office with ZIP code 28699.
