= Battle of Torrence's Tavern =

Part of the American Revolutionary War

Coordinates: 35°32′35″N 80°50′50″W

- Part of the American Revolutionary War
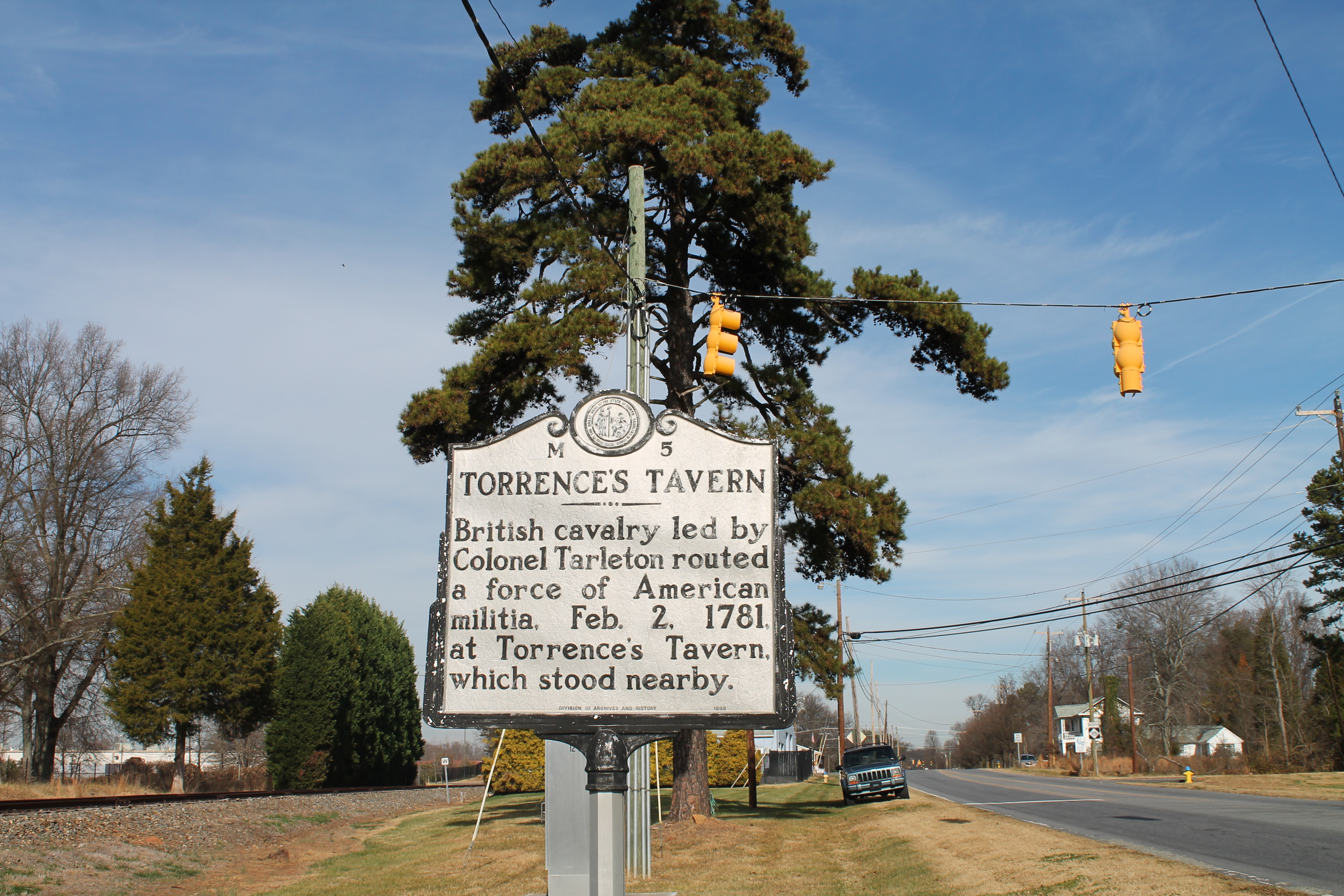
- The historical marker located near the site of the battle in present-day Mount Mourne
Date	1–2 February 1781
Location	Iredell County, North Carolina
Result	British victory

Belligerents
Great Britain: (Kingdom of Great Britain) Loyalists	(United States) Patriot militia

Commanders and leaders
(Kingdom of Great Britain) Banastre Tarleton	(United States) Nathaniel Martin (surrendered)

Strength
Unknown	Approx. 500

Casualties and losses
7 killed Wounded unknown	10 killed Wounded unknown 1 captured

Location of the Battle of Torrence's Tavern

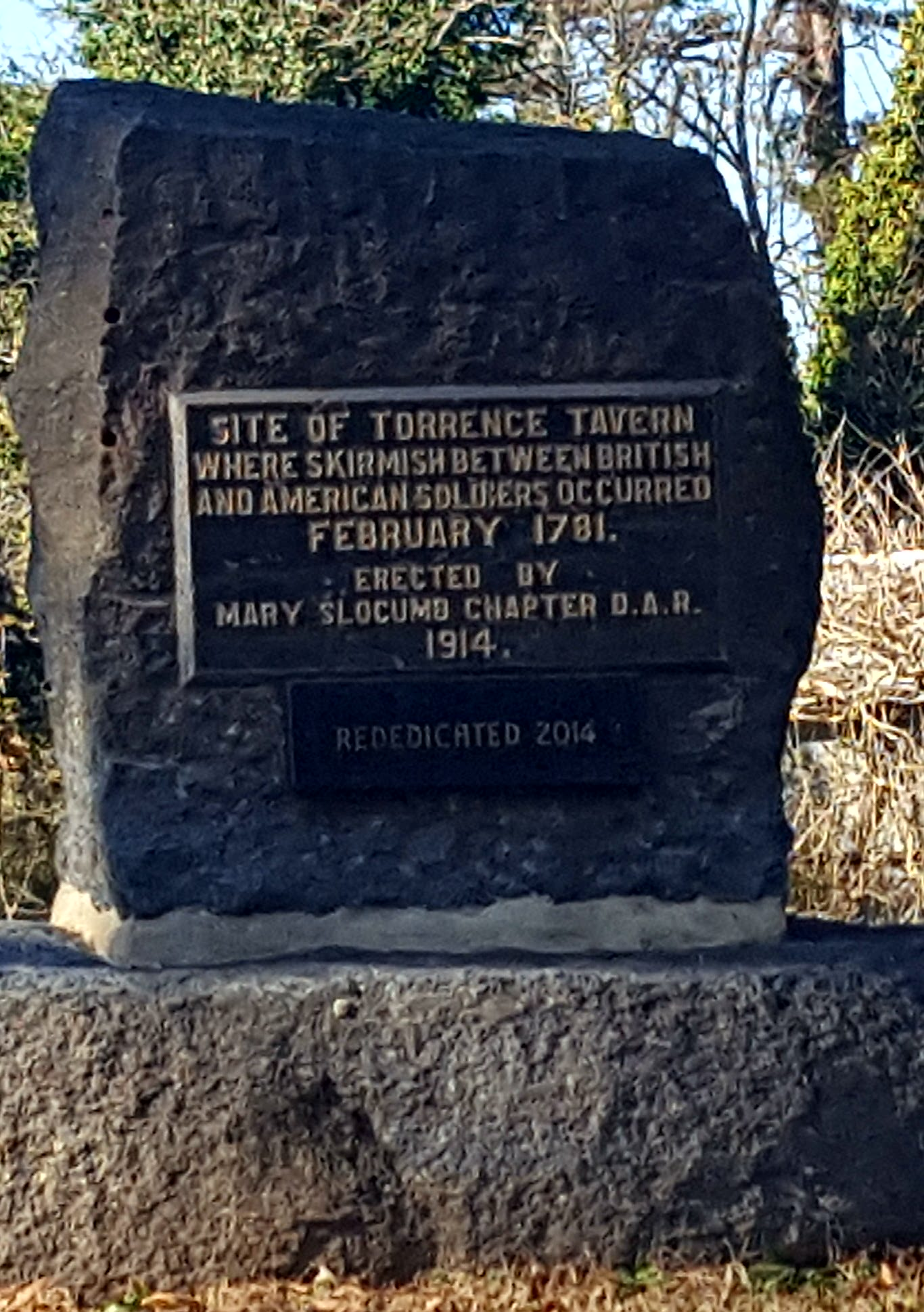
The DAR marker, located at 134 Langtree Road in Mount Mourne.

The Battle of Torrence's Tavern (also referred to as the Skirmish at Torrence's Tavern or the Battle at Tarrant's Tavern) was an engagement of the American Revolutionary War that took place in what was the western portion of Rowan County, North Carolina, approximately 10 miles (16 km) east of the Catawba River near modern-day Mooresville in Iredell County. Torrence's Tavern was a part of the larger Southern campaign of the American Revolution, which, by 1780–1781 involved a series of clashes between the British Army and Loyalist militia and the Continental Army and Patriot militia in the Piedmont region of North and South Carolina.

The engagement took place on either February 1 or February 2, 1781 immediately following the Battle of Cowan's Ford. Units commanded by Colonel Banastre Tarleton defeated General Daniel Morgan's forces. The victory further demoralized fleeing militiamen and refugees, and shrank the numbers of North Carolina militia who turned out. General Nathanael Greene, commander of the Continental Army in the southern theater, moved his forces further east. This move allowed Greene to unite his army with several detached Patriot forces in the Piedmont prior to the Battle of Guilford Courthouse.

== Prelude ==
Throughout the winter of 1780–1781, the British Army in the Carolinas, under the command of General Charles Cornwallis, pursued the southern Continental Army, commanded by Nathanael Greene, from central South Carolina to North Carolina. At the Battle of Cowpens on January 17, 1781, the Continental Army scored a victory against a force, detached from the main British Army, commanded by Tarleton. After the defeat, Cornwallis set out to pursue Greene into nearby North Carolina. The victor of Cowpens, Daniel Morgan, had requested that Greene relieve him of his command of the Patriot militia due to a flare-up of sciatica, but Greene refused. Morgan then set about establishing defenses on the Catawba River, which Cornwallis' army would be forced to cross in order to drive into central and eastern North Carolina. Defensive positions were established at every ford on the river in that state in expectation of the British assault. By January 30, Morgan had received word that the British were indeed preparing to cross the river.

On January 31, 1781, Greene and Morgan left the Catawba River defenses in the hands of militia General William Lee Davidson, and rode towards Salisbury to establish a rallying point. The Continental force crossed the Catawba River ahead of Cornwallis' army, and followed Davidson and Morgan to the rallying point. At Cowan's Ford on February 1, 1781, a force of Patriot militia commanded directly by Davidson held back the British Army for a period of time, and slowed their crossing of the Catawba River. Davidson's militia inflicted numerous casualties before withdrawing towards the rally point. Davidson was killed in the battle at the ford, leaving the surviving militia temporarily without effective strategic command.

== Battle and aftermath ==
=== Date of the engagement ===
Confusion exists over the exact date of the Battle of Torrence's Tavern; official North Carolina historical sources often cite February 2 as the date, but Tarleton's memoirs indicate that the engagement occurred at two o'clock in the afternoon of February 1, after the early-morning confrontation at Cowan's Ford.

=== Tarleton's pursuit of the militia ===
Cornwallis, whose army took longer to cross the Catawba, wanted to prevent Greene's forces from withdrawing quickly and being able to regroup, and so he ordered Colonel Tarleton, the commander of the British Legion, to pursue the militia formerly commanded by Davidson. After the engagement at Cowan's Ford, citizens between the Catawba and Yadkin rivers who were sympathetic to the Patriots became panicked, and many fled their homes with whatever valuables they could pack in a short period of time.

Tarleton's British Legion was a force that contained infantry, cavalry, and artillery units, but Tarleton was forced to take only his mounted soldiers with him due to heavy rains in the area. Upon nearing the site of what Tarleton labeled "Tarrant's Tavern", the British commander gained information that led him to believe the militia ahead were unprepared for any engagement, and were waiting on reinforcements from Mecklenburg and Rowan county militias. At the time of the battle, Torrence's Tavern sat on a roadway that ran from Beatty's and Cowan's fords on the Catawba directly to Salisbury. Additionally, the same rain that forced Tarleton to shed his foot-soldiers had rendered much of the militia's gunpowder supply useless. Refugees with Patriot sympathies who had fled in advance of Cornwallis' army had also used Torrence's Tavern as a rendezvous point, and a large number of both militiamen and refugees consumed alcohol from the tavern's stores.

=== Assault of the British Legion ===
Despite lacking support from Cornwallis' main army, Tarleton's cavalry struck immediately upon arriving at the scene, charging into the militia's makeshift camp. At the first sign of the British approach, the Patriots organized a defense under the ad hoc command of Captain Nathaniel M. Martin, who rallied the militia to a line behind a nearby rail fence. There is also evidence that Col. Thomas Farmer and some 300 militia were stationed at the tavern as a secondary defensive line. When Tarleton ordered the charge, he reminded his cavalrymen to "remember the Cowpens". The British won in a quick and convincing fashion, dispersing the militia units before they managed to complete their rally. Martin was captured in the first few moments of the battle, thereafter leaving the Patriots without any effective tactical command. With Patriot forces under the effects of such confusion, Tarleton divided his dragoons into smaller parties, ordering them to chase and further disperse the militia from the area.

While the battle was small, the defense provided some additional time for Greene's main army of regulars to cross the Yadkin River without harassment near Salisbury, which allowed that force to regroup and resupply. At the time of the skirmish, Greene was at a farm owned by David Carr (sometimes attributed as "Cain"), approximately 6 miles (9.7 km) from the tavern. Carr's farm had been set as a secondary rendezvous point for the Patriot militia, but none of the expected units rallied to that location following the Torrence's Tavern engagement. Upon reaching Salisbury after the loss, and finding nearly 1,700 stands of muskets rusted and in useless condition, Greene reportedly exclaimed: "These are the happy effects of defending the Country with Militia from which the good Lord deliver us!" The tavern that stood at the location of the battle was burned to the ground the day after the engagement by the main British army, as it had been operated by the Ann (Bonar) Torrence, widow of Patriot Adam Torrence—a militiaman killed at the Battle of Ramsour's Mill.

== Legacy ==
The battle's effect on the war in the south was minor, but the failure of Patriot militia to stall Cornwallis at Cowan's Ford and Torrence's Tavern forced Greene to hasten his retreat. He headed straight to his ultimate goal, Guilford Courthouse, where he planned to rendezvous with a detached force under the command of Isaac Huger. The total impact of Torrence's Tavern alone, however, has been rated as especially minor, since the Continental Army force commanded by Greene managed to escape Cornwallis' advance regardless of the short engagement's outcome, and given the more substantial delay to the British caused by the defense at Cowan's Ford the previous day.

John Buchanan, an American historian, postulated that at most, Torrence's Tavern discouraged further militia turnout among North Carolinians of fighting age, noting, however, that turnout had previously been very low in that state. Buchanan went so far as to state that "had Tarleton not lived to write his history of the campaign Torrence's Tavern probably would have merited at most a footnote." Cornwallis, however, wrote to George Germain, 1st Viscount Sackville about the engagements of February 1–2, 1781, and stated that "this stroke, with our passage of the ford, so effectively dispirited the militia, that we met with no further opposition on our march to the Yadkin."

A Daughters of the American Revolution stone marker was placed near the battle site in 1914, marking the site of the tavern and commemorating the members of nearby Centre Presbyterian Church who had fought in the war. In 1939, the State of North Carolina placed a Historical marker on the south-bound shoulder of N.C. Highway 115 in Mount Mourne marking the approximate location of the battle.
