= Centre Presbyterian Church =

Historic church in New York, United States

- U.S. National Register of Historic Places
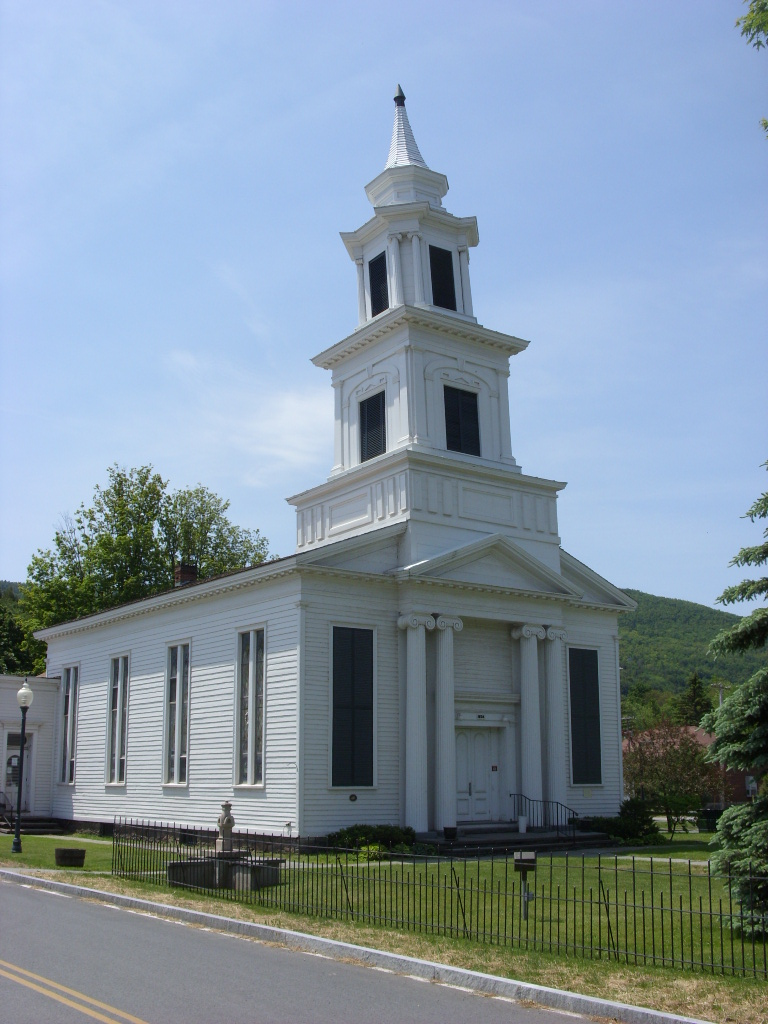
- Centre Presbyterian Church, July 2009

- Location within New York Location within the United States
- Location: Main and Church Sts, Windham, New York
- Coordinates: 42°18′24″N 74°15′9″W
- Area: 0.6 acres (0.24 ha)
- Built: 1835
- Architectural style: Greek Revival, Federal
- NRHP reference No.: 79001586
- Added to NRHP: September 7, 1979

Centre Presbyterian Church, also known as Centre Church, is a historic Presbyterian church at Main (state highway NY 23) and Church streets in Windham, Greene County, New York. It was built in 1835 and is a New England style frame church with elements of Federal and Greek Revival design. It features a pedimented grant portico supported by paired Ionic order columns and a three-stage bell tower.

It was added to the National Register of Historic Places in 1979. After being closed for several years, the church was donated to the town of Windham in the 1970s for use as a civic centre. The building underwent extensive renovations in the 1990s and is home to the Windham Music Festival.
