= Associate Reformed Presbyterian Church (Little Rock, Arkansas) =

Historic church in Arkansas, United States

- U.S. National Register of Historic Places
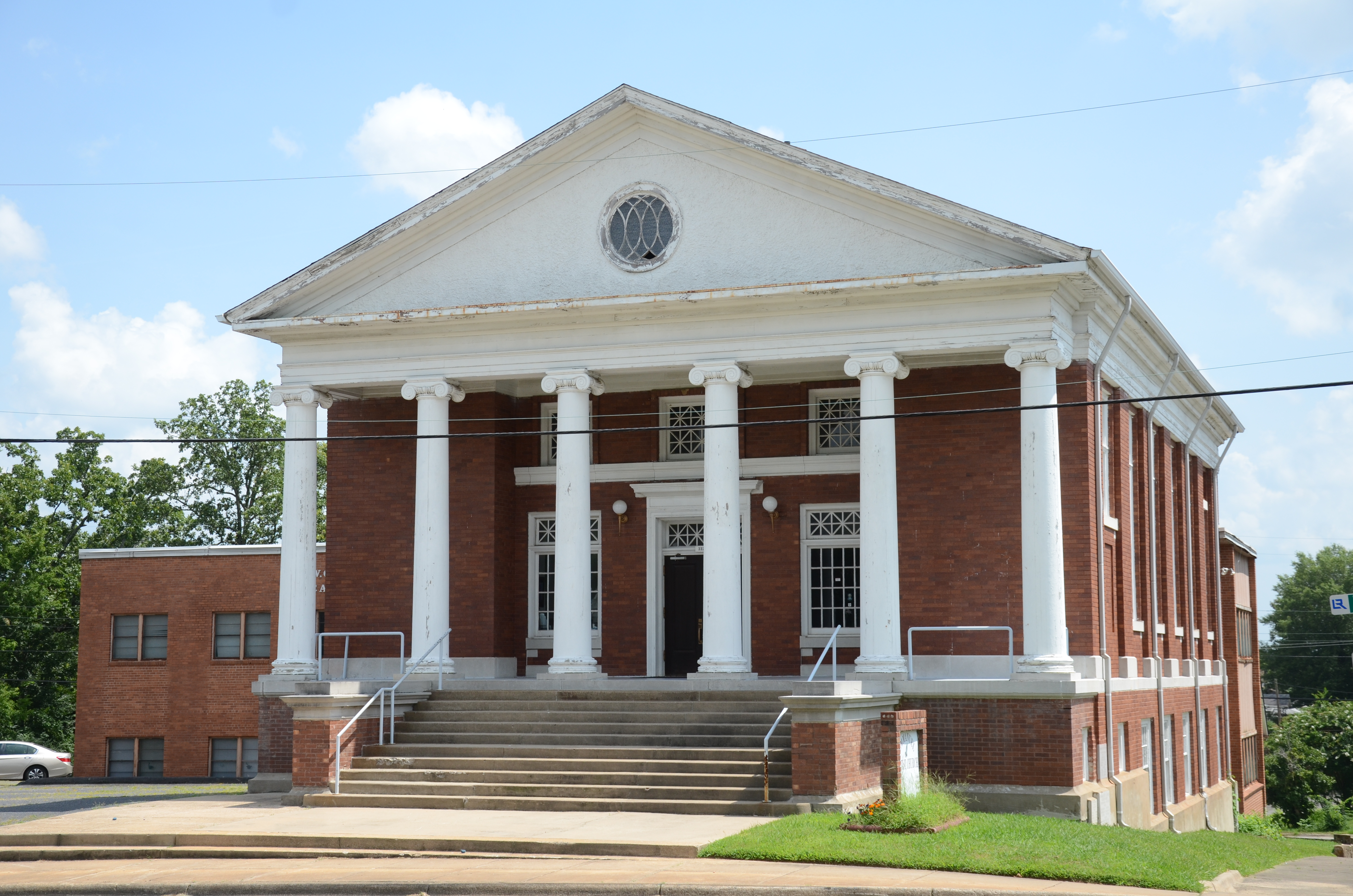

- Location within Arkansas Location within the United States
- Location: 3323 W. 12th St., Little Rock, Arkansas
- Coordinates: 34°44′24″N 92°18′40″W
- Area: less than one acre
- Built: 1925
- Architect: Charles L. Thompson
- Architectural style: Classical Revival
- MPS: Thompson, Charles L., Design Collection TR
- NRHP reference No.: 82000874
- Added to NRHP: December 22, 1982

The former Associate Reformed Presbyterian Church is a historic church building at 3323 W. 12th St. in Little Rock, Arkansas. It is a one and a half-story brick structure, with a striking full-height Greek temple front, that has six Ionic columns supporting a fully pedimented gable with small octagonal window at its center. It was built in 1925 to a design by noted Arkansas architect Charles L. Thompson, and is the only one of his church designs known to use the Greek temple front.

Since 1976 the building has housed Emmanuel Baptist Church, a century old African-American congregation.

The building was listed on the National Register of Historic Places in 1982.

== See also ==
- National Register of Historic Places listings in Little Rock, Arkansas
