= Concord Presbyterian Church (North Carolina) =

Church in North Carolina, US

Coordinates: 35.816315°N 80.937058°W

The Concord Presbyterian Church was founded as an offshoot of the Fourth Creek Congregation in 1775. It was located west of the Fourth Creek Congregation that later became the center of the city of Statesville, North Carolina.

== History ==
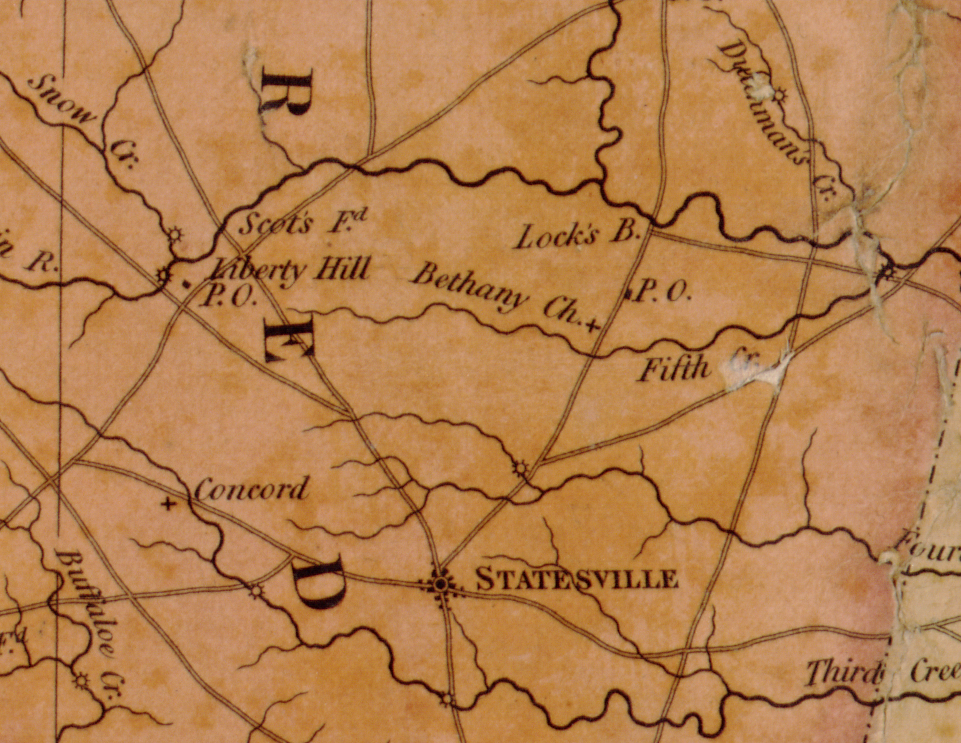
1833 Map showing Concord and Bethany Presbyterian churches

After William Sharpe created his map of the Fourth Creek Congregation in 1773, it was decided to create two additional church congregations – Concord Presbyterian Church and Bethany Presbyterian Church. The Concord congregation was located two miles west of the Fourth Creek congregation near Morrison's mill about a mile south of the current location of the church in what was later called Loray, North Carolina. Members of the Concord Presbyterian Church originally worshipped in a log structure. Dr. James Hall was appointed the pastor of all three churches on April 8, 1778. He served all three churches until at least 1790 and then devoted himself to preaching at Bethany which was nearer his home.

The first elders of the Concord church were James Adams, James Purviance, John Purviance, William Watts, William McKnight, Samuel Harris, Abraham Hill and Thomas Morrison. There have been four church buildings built for the church, including the original log church, the third building built in 1899, and the fourth and present structure built in 1939. After the U.S. Civil War many of the black families in the area began worshipping at the nearby Logan Presbyterian Church.

== See also ==
- Concord Township, Iredell County, North Carolina
