= Coddle Creek Township, Iredell County, North Carolina =

Coordinates: 35°34′8″N 80°47′48″W

Coddle Creek Township
- Township
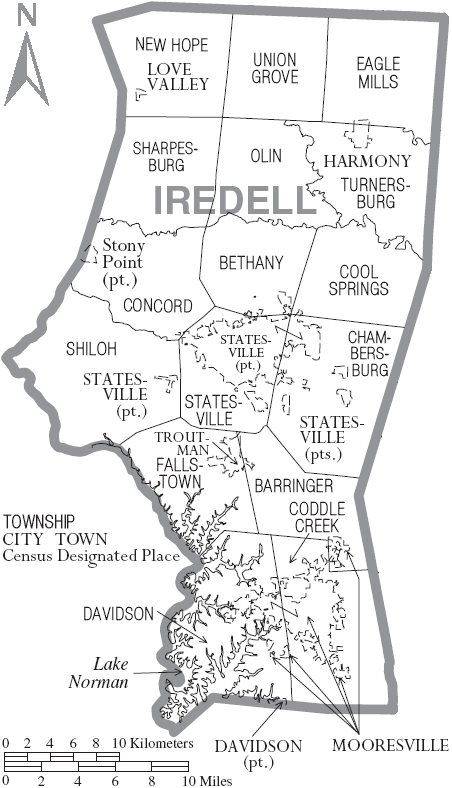
- Coddle Creek Township in Iredell County
- Country: United States
- State: North Carolina
- County: Iredell
- Established: 1868

Government
  - Type: non-functioning county subdivision

Area
  - Total: 45.78 sq mi (118.6 km^{2})
  - Land: 45.68 sq mi (118.3 km^{2})
  - Water: 0.10 sq mi (0.26 km^{2})

Population (2010)
  - Total: 32,599
  - Density: 713.7/sq mi (275.6/km^{2})

Coddle Creek Township is a non-functioning civil township in Iredell County, North Carolina, United States. By the requirements of the North Carolina Constitution of 1868, the counties were divided into townships, including sixteen in Iredell County. Part of the town of Mooresville is within Coddle Creek Township.
