= Fallstown Township, Iredell County, North Carolina =

Coordinates: 35°41′06″N 80°55′51″W

Fallstown Township
- Township
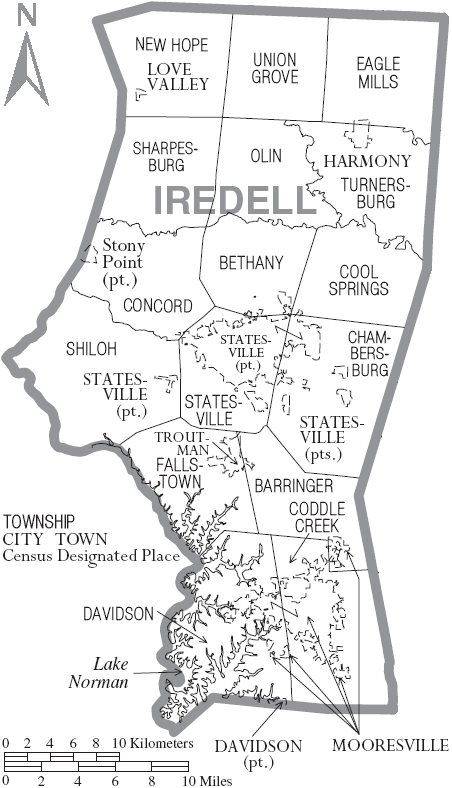
- Fallstown Township in Iredell County
- Country: United States
- State: North Carolina
- County: Iredell
- Established: 1868

Government
  - Type: non-functioning administrative division

Area
  - Total: 34.23 sq mi (88.7 km^{2})
  - Land: 30.4 sq mi (79 km^{2})
  - Water: 3.83 sq mi (9.9 km^{2})

Population (2010)
  - Total: 8,736
  - Density: 287.3/sq mi (110.9/km^{2})

Fallstown Township is a non-functioning administrative division of Iredell County, North Carolina, United States. By the requirements of the North Carolina Constitution of 1868, the counties were divided into townships, which included Fallstown township as one of sixteen townships in Iredell County.

== Geography ==
The town of Troutman is partially within Fallstown township.
