= Davidson Township, Iredell County, North Carolina =

Coordinates: 35°34′01″N 80°53′48″W

Davidson Township
- Township
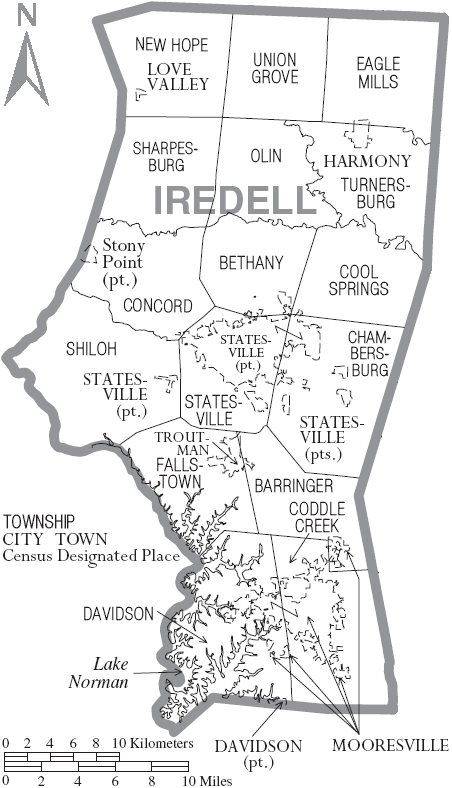
- Davidson Township in Iredell County
- Country: United States
- State: North Carolina
- County: Iredell
- Established: 1868

Government
  - Type: non-functioning administrative division

Area
  - Total: 53.58 sq mi (138.8 km^{2})
  - Land: 38.11 sq mi (98.7 km^{2})
  - Water: 15.47 sq mi (40.1 km^{2})

Population (2010)
  - Total: 32,786
  - Density: 860.2/sq mi (332.1/km^{2})

Davidson Township is a non-functioning administrative division of Iredell County, North Carolina, United States. By the requirements of the North Carolina Constitution of 1868, the counties were divided into townships, which included Davidson township as one of sixteen townships in Iredell County.

== Geography ==
Davidson Township contains some of the town of Mooresville. Lake Norman extends into Davidson Township from Catawba County.
