= Statesville Township, Iredell County, North Carolina =

Coordinates: 35°46′22″N 80°53′46″W

Statesville Township
- Township
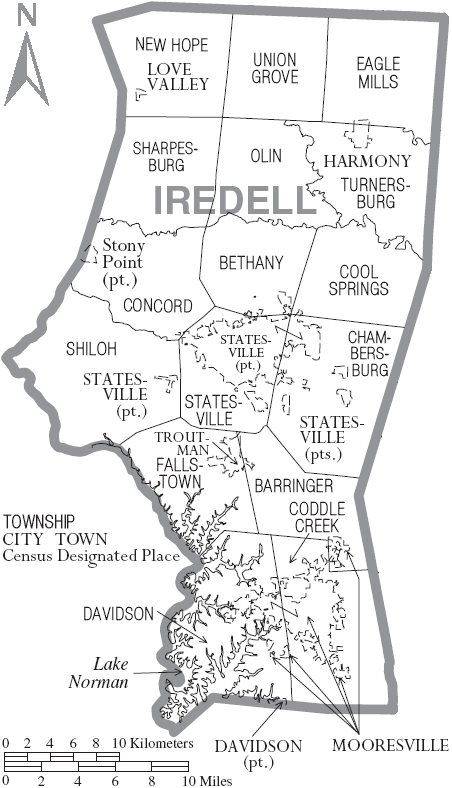
- Statesville Township in Iredell County
- Country: United States
- State: North Carolina
- County: Iredell
- Established: 1868

Government
  - Type: non-functioning subdivision

Area
  - Total: 32.69 sq mi (84.7 km^{2})
  - Land: 32.52 sq mi (84.2 km^{2})
  - Water: 0.17 sq mi (0.44 km^{2})

Population (2010)
  - Total: 26,460
  - Density: 813.6/sq mi (314.1/km^{2})

Statesville Township is a non-functioning administrative division of Iredell County, North Carolina, United States. By the requirements of the North Carolina Constitution of 1868, the counties were divided into townships, which included Statesville township as one of sixteen townships in Iredell county. The town of Statesville, North Carolina is contained mostly within Statesville township.

== Geography and demography ==
Statesville township contains most of the city of Statesville. According to the 2010 Census, 5,500 of the 26,460 inhabitants of Statesville lived outside the Statesville township.
