= Williamsburg Township =

Williamsburg Township may refer to one of the following places in the United States:

- Williamsburg Township, Franklin County, Kansas
- Williamsburg Township, Phelps County, Nebraska
- Williamsburg Township, Rockingham County, North Carolina
- Williamsburg Township, Clermont County, Ohio
- Williamsburgh, North Carolina (a former town in Iredell County, North Carolina

See also

- Williamsburg (disambiguation)
- Williams Township (disambiguation)
