= Turnersburg =

Turnersburg or Turnersburgh can refer to any of several places in the United States:

- Turnersburg, North Carolina
- Turnersburg Township, Iredell County, North Carolina
- Turnersburgh, Vermont - the former name of Chelsea, Vermont
