= North Carolina Highway 115 =

State highway in North Carolina, US

North Carolina Highway 115

Route information
- Maintained by NCDOT
- Length: 71.1 mi (114.4 km)
- Existed: 1930–present

Major junctions
- South end: US 21 in Charlotte
- I-485 near Charlotte; I-77 near Troutman; US 70 in Statesville; I-40 in Statesville; US 421 in North Wilkesboro
- North end: US 421 Bus. / NC 18 / NC 268 in North Wilkesboro

Location
- Country: United States
- State: North Carolina
- Counties: Mecklenburg, Iredell, Wilkes

Highway system
- North Carolina Highway System; Interstate; US; State; Scenic
← NC 114	→ NC 116

North Carolina Highway 115 (NC 115) is a primary state highway in the U.S. state of North Carolina. It runs from U.S. Route 21 in North Charlotte north through Mecklenburg, Iredell and Wilkes counties. Its northern terminus is at its intersection with US 421 Business, NC 18 and NC 268 in North Wilkesboro.

== History ==
NC 115 was established between 1929 and 1930 by the North Carolina State Highway Commission. It first appeared on official North Carolina state highway maps in 1930. At the time of establishment, the southern terminus of NC 115 was located at US 21, US 70, NC 10, NC 26, and NC 90 in Statesville. It travelled northwest through Iredell County before reaching its northern terminus at the Iredell County-Wilkes County Line. From its northern terminus, the road continued to US 421 and NC 60 near Wilkesboro. At the time of establishment, roughly the southern half of NC 115 was paved while the remainder of the roadway was a gravel, sand-clay, and topsoil roadway.

By 1933, NC 115 was extended north from the Iredell County-Wilkes County line to US 421 and NC 60 2 miles (3.2 km) east of Wilkesboro. The new section of NC 115 in Wilkes County was classified as a gravel, sand-clay, and topsoil roadway. By 1940, NC 115 was completely paved between Statesville and Wilkesboro. Within one year, the highway was extended north from its previous northern terminus to US 421 in North Wilkesboro. To accomplish this, NC 115 travelled along a brief concurrency with US 421 to the northwest. It then diverged from US 421 and travelled for approximately 1.4 miles (2.3 km) to NC 18 and NC 268. At the intersection, NC 115 turned southwest to run concurrently with the highways. Within North Wilkesboro, NC 115 used B Street and D Street as split streets between US 421 and Sixth Street. Sixth Street provided the connection for NC 115 between the two split streets. By 1959, NC 115 was extended south to US 21 near Charlotte. The highway ran concurrently with US 21 for 13 miles (21 km) between Statesville and Shepards. the highway then travelled along its own routing through Mooresville, Davidson, and Huntersville. It ran in concurrency with US 21 or closely paralleled US 21 between its new southern terminus and Statesville. On March 1, 1975, NC 115 was removed from its concurrency with NC 18 and NC 268 in North Wilkesboro and was truncated to its current northern terminus. On August 26, 2003, northbound NC 115 was removed from Main Street between McClelland Street and Iredell Avenue, and Iredell Avenue between Main Street and Broad Street in Mooresville. The highway was rerouted to briefly follow McClelland Street between Main Street and Broad Street and then follow Broad Street to Iredell Avenue.

== Major intersections ==
County	Location	mi	km	Destinations	Notes
Mecklenburg	Charlotte	0.0	0.0	US 21 (Sunset Road / Statesville Road)	
Mecklenburg	Charlotte	2.0	3.2	NC 24 (W. T. Harris Boulevard)	
Mecklenburg	Joplor	4.0– 4.3	6.4– 6.9	I-485 to I-77 / I-85 – Matthews, Pineville	Exit 23C (I-485)
Mecklenburg	Huntersville	9.6	15.4	NC 73 (Sam Furr Road) – Concord	
Iredell	Mooresville	21.1	34.0	NC 3 / NC 152 (Iredell Avenue) – Mitchell Community College Mooresville Center	
Iredell	Mooresville	22.2	35.7	NC 150 (Oak Ridge Farm Highway) – Lincolnton, Salisbury	
Iredell	Shinnville	24.1	38.8	US 21 south (Charlotte Highway)	Southern end of US 21 concurrency
Iredell		28.1– 28.4	45.2– 45.7	I-77 – Charlotte, Statesville	Exit 42 (I-77)
Iredell	Statesville	36.2	58.3	US 70 (Garner Bagnal Boulevard) to I-77	
Iredell	Statesville	36.9	59.4	US 21 north / US 64 (Front Street)	Northern end of US 21 concurrency
Iredell	Statesville	37.1	59.7	NC 90 (Water Street) – Taylorsville, Lenoir	
Iredell	Statesville	38.5– 38.6	62.0– 62.1	I-40 – Mocksville, Hickory	Exit 150 (I-40)
Iredell	Union Grove	55.6	89.5	NC 901 south (Memorial Highway) to I-77 – Harmony	Northern terminus of NC 901
Wilkes	North Wilkesboro	68.0– 68.2	109.4– 109.8	US 421 / US 421 Bus. begins – Winston-Salem, Boone	Exit 282 (US 421); southern end of US 421 Bus. Concurrency
Wilkes	North Wilkesboro	71.1	114.4	US 421 Bus. / NC 18 north / NC 268 (2nd Street) / D Street	Northern end of US 421 Bus. Concurrency
1.000 mi = 1.609 km; 1.000 km = 0.621 mi: Concurrency terminus
