= Williamsburgh =

Williamsburgh may refer to:

- Williamsburgh, a residential area of Paisley, Renfrewshire, Scotland, originally a separate village
- Williamsburg, Brooklyn, originally called Williamsburgh from 1802 to 1855
- Rockville, Maryland, called Williamsburgh from 1784 to 1803
- Williamsburg, Michigan, originally called Williasmburgh
- Williamsburgh, North Carolina

== See also ==
- Williamsburg (disambiguation)
