= Turnersburg Township, Iredell County, North Carolina =

Coordinates: 35°55′27″N 80°45′32″W

Turnersburg
- Township
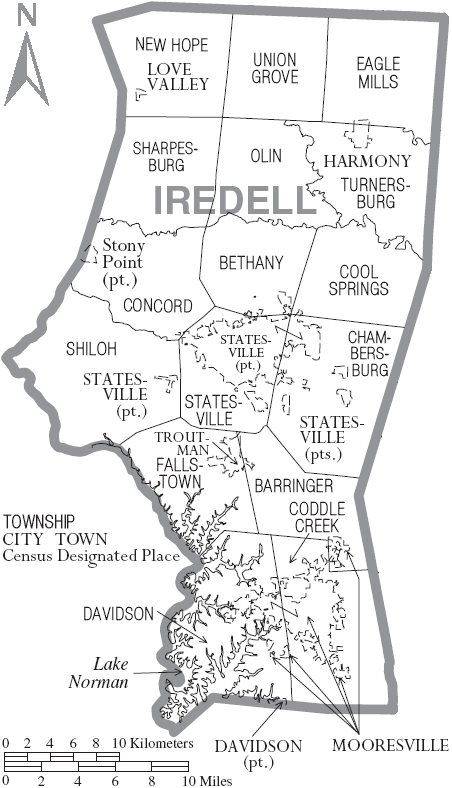
- Turnersburg Township in Iredell County

- Location within North Carolina Location within the United States
- Country: United States
- State: North Carolina
- County: Iredell
- Established: 1868

Government
  - Type: non-functioning county subdivision

Area
  - Total: 36.15 sq mi (93.6 km^{2})
  - Land: 35.84 sq mi (92.8 km^{2})
  - Water: 0.30 sq mi (0.78 km^{2})

Population (2020)
  - Total: 3,797
  - Density: 105.94/sq mi (40.90/km^{2})
- Time zone: UTC-5 (Eastern (EST))
  - Summer (DST): UTC-4 (EDT)

Turnersburg Township is a nonfunctioning administrative division in northeastern Iredell County, North Carolina, United States. Turnersburg township was established in 1868. The only major town in Turnersburg township is Harmony, which is also partially within Eagle Mills township.

== Geography ==
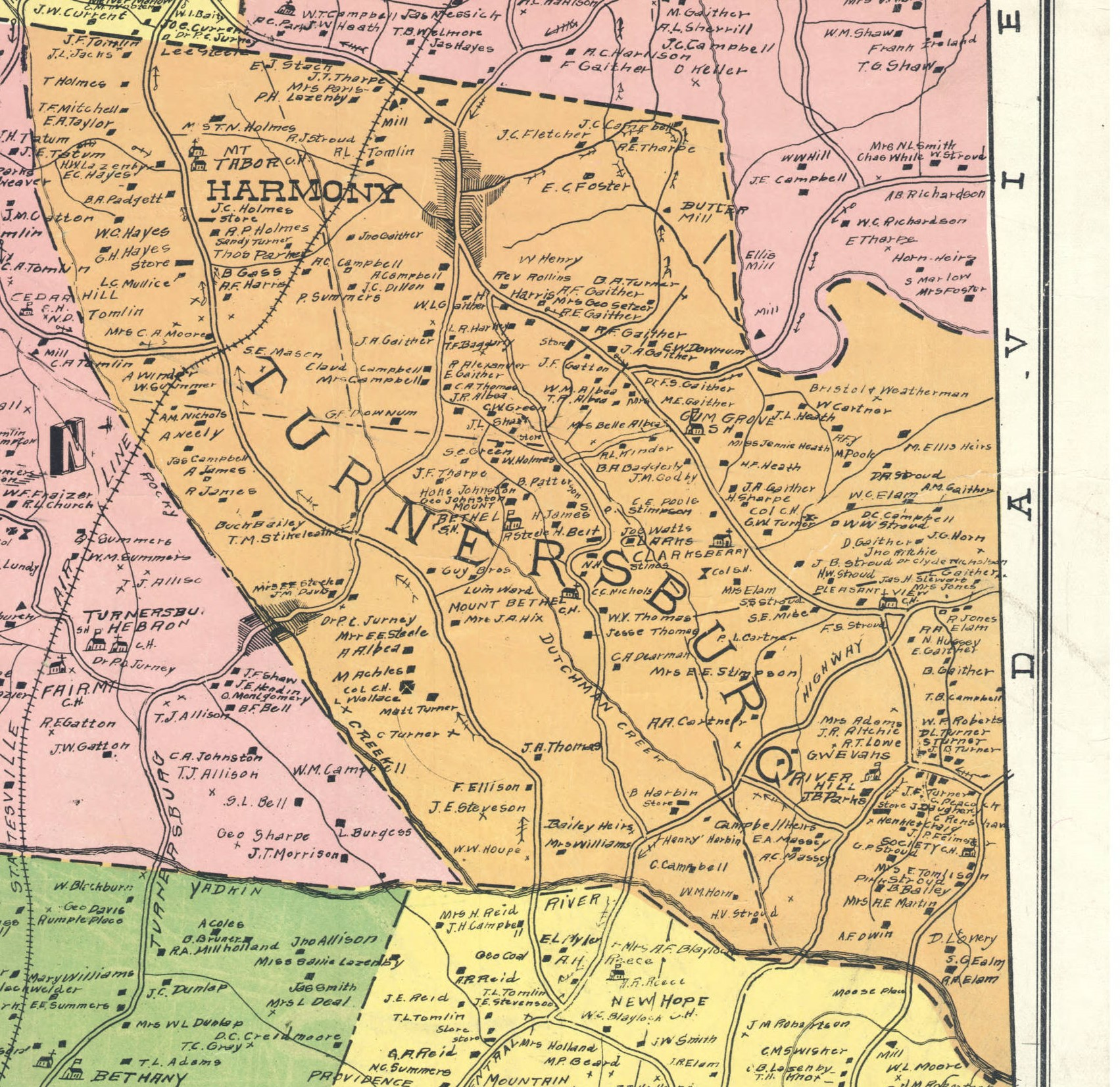
Map of Turnersburg Township, Iredell County, North Carolina in 1917

Turnersburg township is bordered on the north by Eagle Mills and Union Grove townships, on the west by Olin township, on the south by Cool Springs township, and on the east by Davie County. The South Yadkin River is Turnersburg township's southern border. Other bodies of water that flow through Turnersburg township are Dutchman Creek and Kinder Creek. Skyview Lake and Skyview Lake Upper are within Turnersburg township.

Note: The town of Turnersburg is not located in Turnersburg township.

== Demography ==
Two years after formation of the township, the population of Turnersburg township was 876 in 1870, including 572 (65 percent) whites males and females and 304 (35 percent) Colored males and females.

Historical population
Census	Pop.	Note	%±
1870	876		—
1880	1,031		17.7%
1900	1,350		—
1910	1,414		4.7%
1920	1,586		12.2%
1930	1,902		19.9%
1940	3,068		61.3%
1950	1,710		−44.3%
1960	1,824		6.7%
1970	2,018		10.6%
1980	2,314		14.7%
1990	2,392		3.4%
2010	3,880		—
2020	3,797		−2.1%
U.S. Decennial Census; 2020

== History ==
By the requirements of the North Carolina Constitution of 1868, the county was divided into townships. Previous to that time, the subdivisions were Captain's Districts. While the Captain's Districts referred primarily to the militia, it served also for the election precinct, the tax listing and tax collecting district. Turnersburg Township has been used since 1870 as a census district.

Both the town of Turnersburg and Turnersburg township were named for the family of Wilfred Dent Turner (1855-1933), a lawyer, legislator, lieutenant governor, and businessman born in the town of Turnersburg.

Significant historical and geographic locations in Turnersburg Township include:

- B. Harbin Store
- Clarksbury Methodist Church
- Harmony (town)
- J. B. Parks Store
- J. C. Holmes Store
- Butler Mill
- G. H. Hayes Store
- Gaither House in Harmony
- Gum Grove School (District 5)
- Harmony School (District 1)
- J. C. Holmes Store
- Morrison–Campbell House near Harmony, owned by James E. Morrison and later Columbus Wilford Campbell
- Mt. Bethel Methodist Church
- Mt. Bethel Road
- Mt. Bethel School (District 3)
- Mt. Nebo Baptist Church
- River Hill School (District 4)
- Mt. Tabor Presbyterian Church
- Mt. Tabor School (District 2)
- Piney Grove AME Zion Church
- Pleasant View Baptist Church
- River Hill School
- Society Baptist Church, founded in 1823
