= Wilfred D. Turner =

American politician (1855–1933)

Wilfred Dent Turner
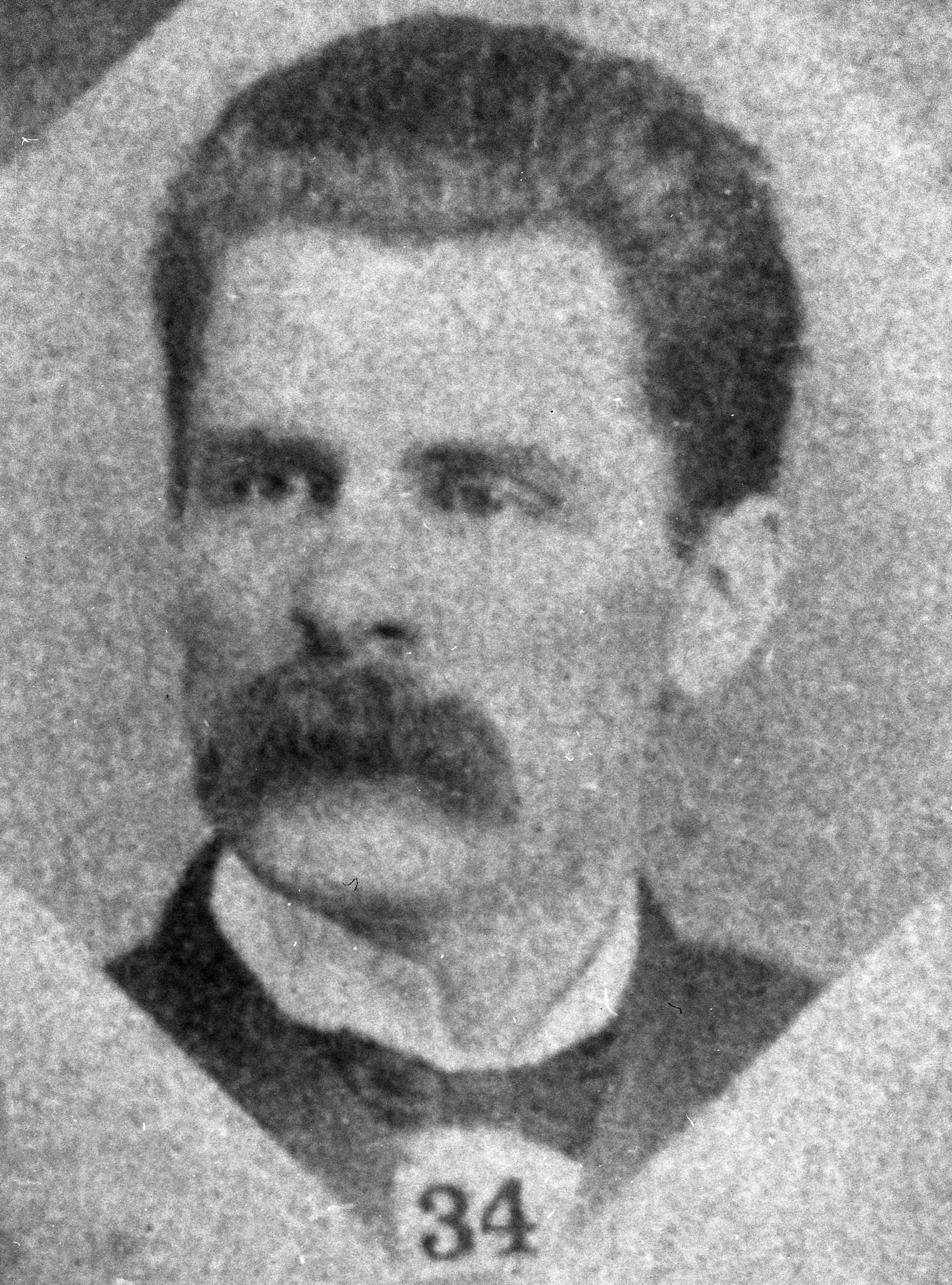
- Wilfred D. Turner
- Born: January 30, 1855; Turnersburg, Iredell County, North Carolina
- Died: November 8, 1933 (aged 78); Statesville, Iredell County, North Carolina
- Burial place: Oakwood Cemetery, Statesville, North Carolina
- Occupations: lawyer, politician businessman
- Known for: Lieutenant Governor of North Carolina
- Parents: Wilfred Turner (father); Dorcas Tomlinson (mother)

Wilfred Dent Turner (January 30, 1855 – November 8, 1933) was a lawyer, legislator, businessman, and the ninth Lieutenant Governor of North Carolina from 1901 to 1905, serving under Governor Charles B. Aycock.

== Early life ==
Wilfred Dent Turner was born in Iredell County, North Carolina, on January 30, 1855. His grandfather, Samuel Turner moved to Iredell County from Port Tobacco, Maryland, in 1818. Wilfred's parents were Wilfred Turner (1809–1893) and Dorcas (Tomlinson) Turner (1813–1900). The Turner family was the namesake of both the present day town of Turnersburg and Turnersburg township. Wilfred attended Duke University, Class of 1876, and was a member of Chi Phi fraternity. He died on November 8, 1933, and was buried in the Oakwood Cemetery in Statesville, North Carolina.

Wilfred was married three times:

1. Ida Lanier (1857–1894), married in 1878; four children: Mrs. W. A. Colvert, Laura Lanier Turner, Mrs. James F. Robertson, and Jack Turner.
2. Julie Harllee McCall (1867–1925), married in 1897; children: W. A. Turner and Dent Turner.
3. Sarah F. Goff, married in 1927

== Career ==
A Democrat, Turner was elected to the North Carolina Senate in 1886, 1888 and 1890 from Iredell County. He was President pro tempore of the North Carolina Senate in 1891. Turner also served as the president of the Monbo Cotton Manufacturing Company.

Turner was also a delegate to the 1896 Democratic National Convention. He died at the age of 78 in 1933 after a short illness.

Party political offices
Preceded by Thomas W. Mason	Democratic nominee for Lieutenant Governor of North Carolina; 1900	Succeeded by Francis D. Winston
Political offices
Preceded by Charles A. Reynolds	Lieutenant Governor of North Carolina; 1901-1905	Succeeded by Francis D. Winston
