= Olin Township, Iredell County, North Carolina =

Coordinates: 35°55′31″N 80°51′44″W

Olin Township
- Township
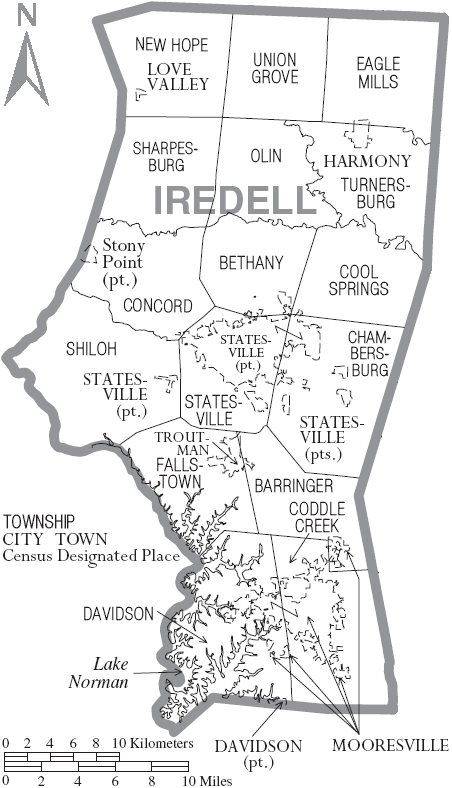
- Olin Township in Iredell County
- Country: United States
- State: North Carolina
- County: Iredell
- Established: 1868

Government
  - Type: non-functioning administrative division

Area
  - Total: 30.1 sq mi (78 km^{2})
  - Land: 29.87 sq mi (77.4 km^{2})
  - Water: 0.23 sq mi (0.60 km^{2})

Population (2010)
  - Total: 1,840
  - Density: 61.6/sq mi (23.8/km^{2})

Olin Township is a non-functioning administrative division of Iredell County, North Carolina, United States. By the requirements of the North Carolina Constitution of 1868, the counties were divided into townships, which included Olin township.

== Geography ==
Olin township is bounded by Union Grove township on the north, Sharpesburg township on the west, Bethany and Cool Springs townships on the south, and Turnersburg township on the east. The South Yadkin River flows on the border of Olin township on the south and east.

Interstate 77 runs north–south through Olin township.

== History ==
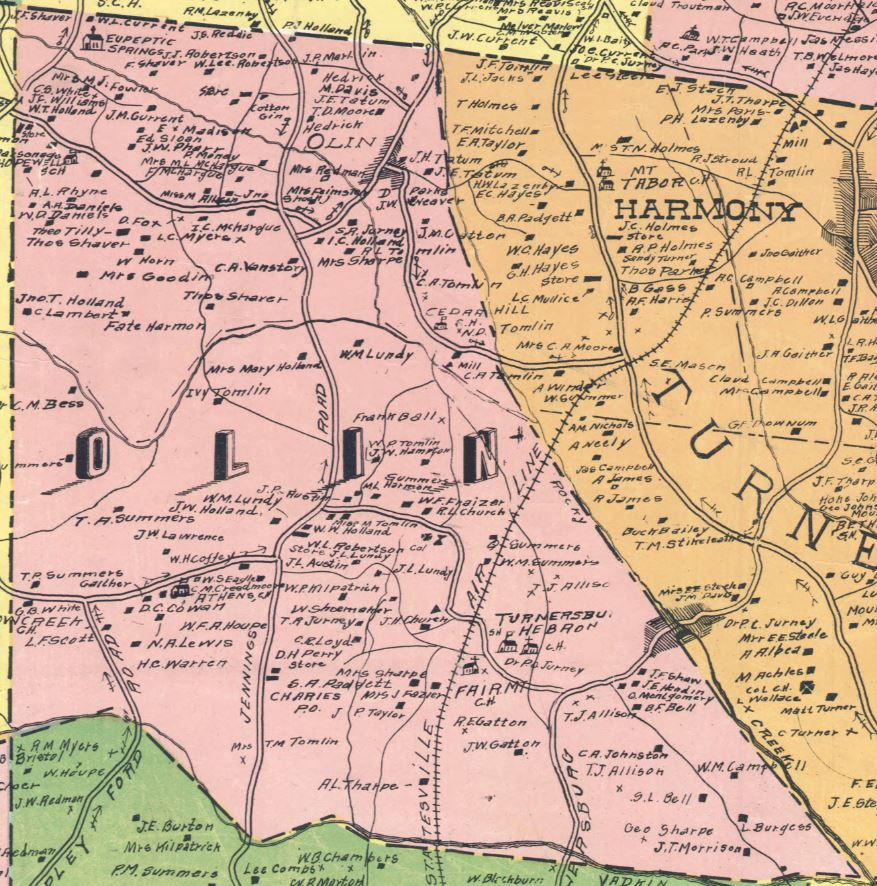
Olin Township in 1917

The following are or have been located in Olin township:

- Charles Post Office (1899-1951)
- Ebenezer Academy (1823-1900)
- Fairmont Church
- Friendship Church
- Gethsemane Baptist Church
- Hebron Baptist Church
- Moss Chapel Methodist Church and Cemetery, founded in about 1800
- Mount Sinai Church
- Mount Vernon Baptist Church and Cemetery, founded in 1836
- New Institute (1852-1856)
- North Iredell High School
- Olin unincorporated community
- Olin United Methodist Church and Cemetery, founded in 1851
- Refuge Church
- Siloan Church
- Turnersburg, town (1858–present)
