= Holland–Summers House =

Historic house in North Carolina, United States

- U.S. National Register of Historic Places
- Location within North Carolina Location within the United States
- Location: Off SR 1904, near Statesville, North Carolina
- Coordinates: 35°55′03″N 80°54′04″W
- Area: 79 acres (32 ha)
- Built: c. 1850
- Architectural style: Greek Revival
- MPS: Iredell County MRA
- NRHP reference No.: 80002852
- Added to NRHP: November 24, 1980

Holland–Summers House was a historic home located near Harmony, North Carolina, United States. It was built in 1850, and is a two-story, five-bay, L-shaped Greek Revival-style brick dwelling. It has a low hipped roof and the front facade features a colonnade of white cement Doric order pilasters. Also on the property is a contributing heavy timber frame smokehouse.

It was added to the National Register of Historic Places in 1980.
