= Perciphull Campbell House =

Historic house built about 1820 in Iredell County, North Carolina

- U.S. National Register of Historic Places
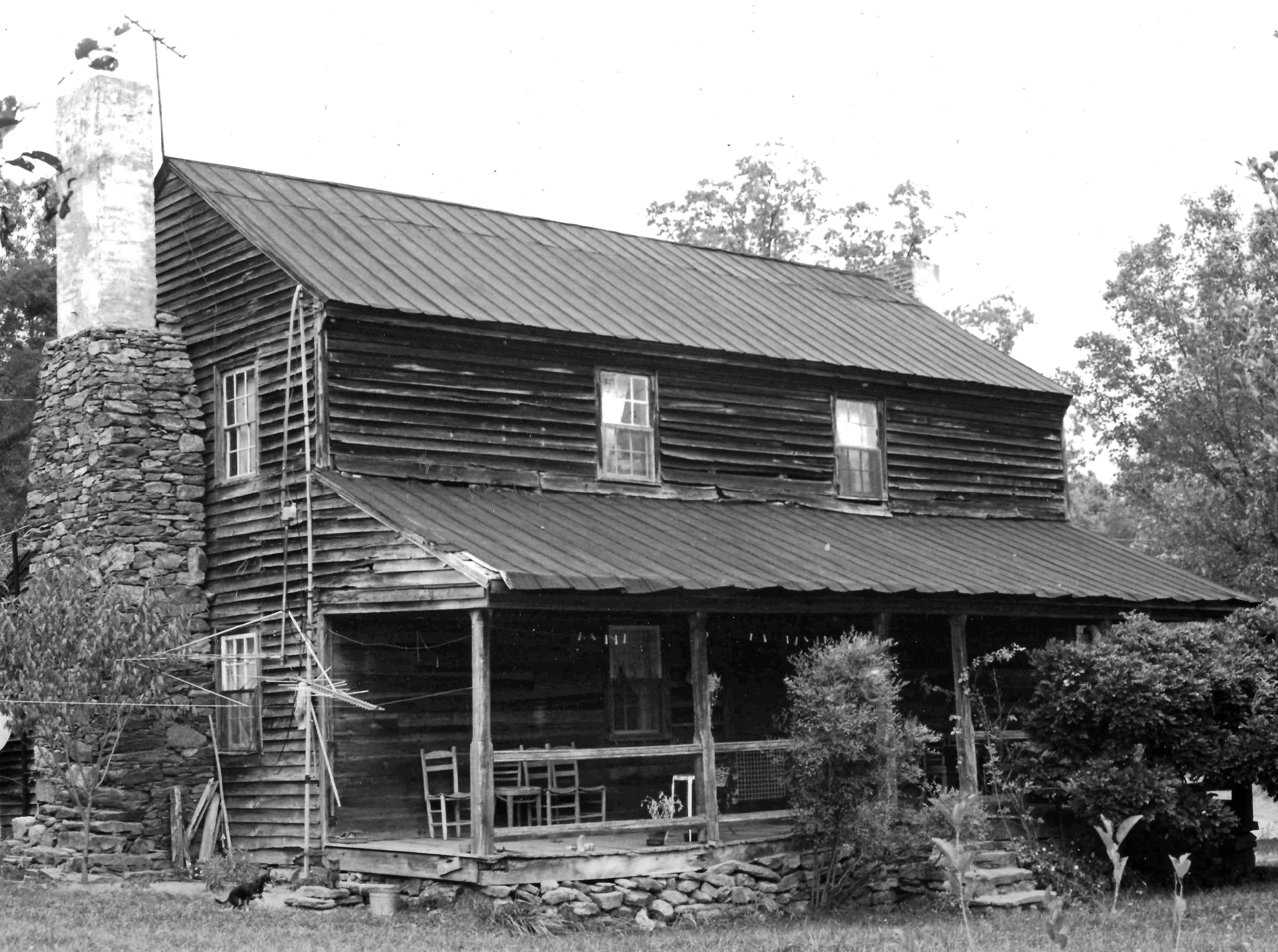
- Perciphull Campbell House in 1981

- Location within North Carolina Location within the United States
- Location: SR 1832, near Union Grove, North Carolina
- Coordinates: 36°02′32.6″N 80°50′35″W
- Area: 18 acres (7.3 ha)
- Built: c. 1820
- MPS: Iredell County MRA
- NRHP reference No.: 80002881
- Added to NRHP: December 8, 1980

Perciphull Campbell House is a historic home located near Union Grove in Iredell County, North Carolina. The house was built about 1820 by Perciphull Campbell and is a two-story, frame I-house dwelling. It has a gable roof, stone foundation, and exterior chimneys with stuccoed brick stacks. Also on the property is the contributing smokehouse.

It was added to the National Register of Historic Places in 1980.

== Description ==
The Perciphull Campbell House, located above Hunting Creek in the rolling hills near the northern edge of Iredell County, is an undisturbed example of the solid but unpretentious Piedmont Carolina dwelling of the type sometimes labelled "I-House".

Probably built circa 1820, the Campbell House is a two-story, gable-roofed frame building on dry-laid stone foundation. The exterior stone chimneys have stuccoed brick stacks. The 3x2 bay main body of the house is complemented by a shed porch across the front and shed rooms across the rear. Both front and rear doors are replacements, but the windows still retain 6/6 sash. The front porch is nicely detailed with flush siding, bold chamfered posts with Lamb's tongue, and molded railing.

The interior of the house follows a hall and parlor plan. There was once a partition creating a center hall. The walls of the interior are flush sheathed. Each of the two downstairs has a massive fireplace with transitional Georgian/Federal Style mantel. While the mantels differ somewhat in detail, each is segmentally arched above the firebox and has side pilasters, a paneled frieze, and a heavy multi-layered shelf which is blocked outward at each corner and in the center. These mantels bear a strong similarity to the one found at the John R. Campbell House, located about one and a half miles west of the Perciphull Campbell House. A partially enclosed stairway winds from the right hand room upward to the second story. The second story consists of one large room covered with hand-planed, random-width sheathing. The only interior alterations consist primarily of linoleum-covered floors downstairs and plywood paneling and tile ceiling in the left-hand first story room.

Several related structures are found west of the house. Of particular interest is the smoke-house, which probably dates from the same period as the house. This weather-boarded structure features a gable roof with deep overhang on the front end and a batten door with the same type of strap hinges as those found in the house. On the side closest to the house is a stone well. Northwest of the well is a frame corn crib which appears to be of later date than the house. In an open field across the road is a frame tenant building of the late 19th-early 20th century era.

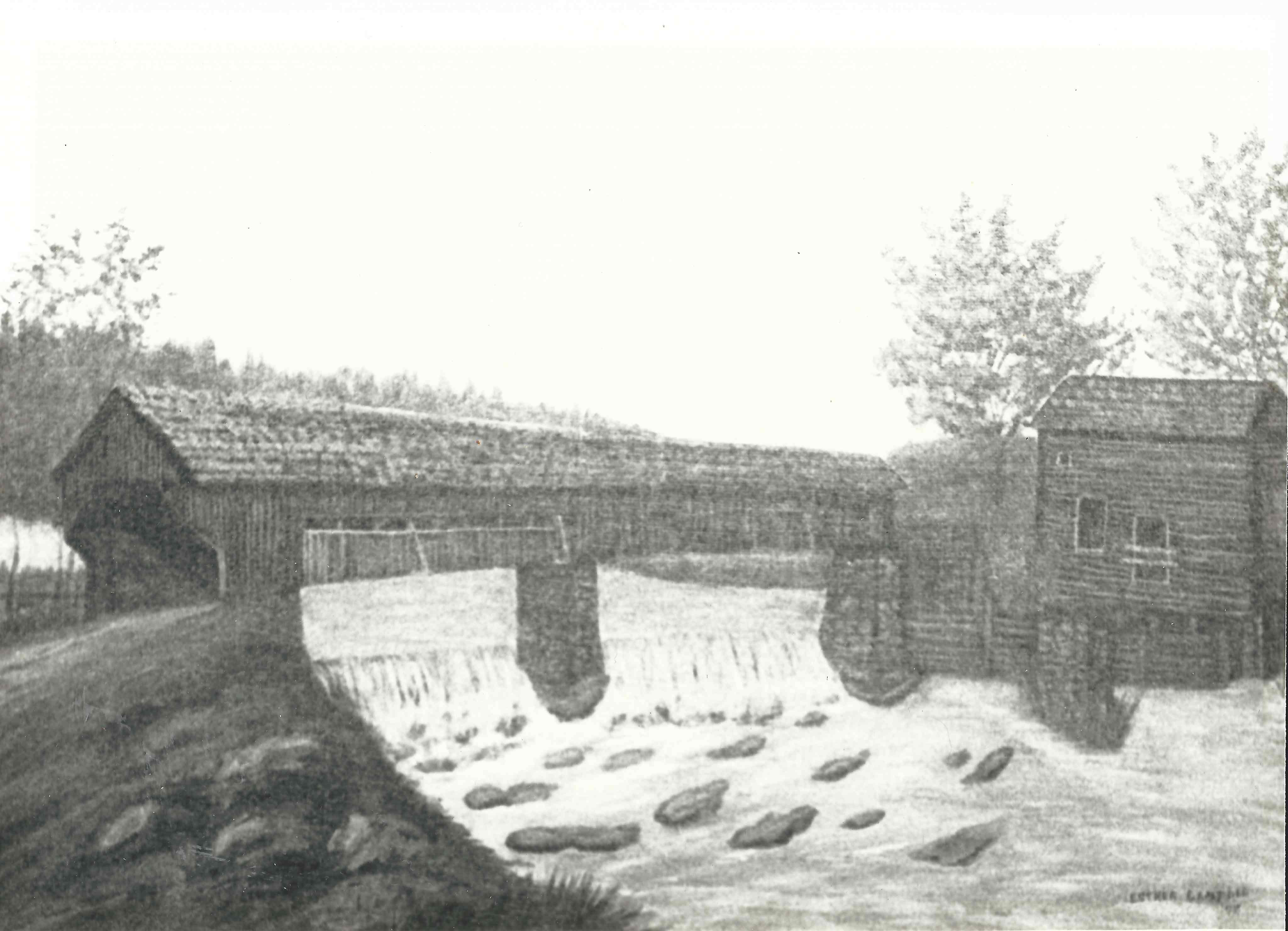
Painting of the covered bridge at the Campbell Mill before 1930

Near the south end of the property runs Hunting Creek. A modern bridge on SR 1832 now crosses the creek, but in earlier years a covered bridge had been at the site. Just east of the bridge was the Perciphull Campbell grist mill, which is no longer standing.

Long associated with the Perciphull Campbell House are several outbuildings, at least one of which (a smokehouse) appears to date from the approximate time of the house's construction. There has, in addition, been a long association between the house and a gristmill which was located on the northern side of Hunting Creek just across the small country road which is now SR 132. As early as 1800 a tub mill was being operated on or near this site by John Campbell. In 1850 and 1860 a mill was being operated on this site by Perciphull Campbell, Jr. This mill continued in operation until well into the twentieth century, being indicated as "Campbell's Mill" at least as late as 1917. The mill remained standing until the 1930s, located just beneath a covered bridge which formerly spanned Hunting Creek at this point.

== History ==
The Perciphull Campbell House, probably built in the 1810s or 1820s for Perciphull and Sarah Campbell and their eight children, exemplifies early 19th century vernacular architectural patterns of Iredell County and Piedmont North Carolina. The form of the house—with gable roof, exterior end chimneys, and front shed porch and rear shed rooms—embodies the type labelled "Carolina I-house" by geographer Fred Kniffen. The massive chimneys are of local stone irregularly laid, as are the low foundations. The interior of the house follows the typical vernacular hall-parlor plan, plus shed rooms, and finish is simple but well-preserved. Notable outbuildings complete the farm complex including an early smokehouse, stone well, and corn crib. The complex communicates in its unpainted condition much of the character of typical antebellum Piedmont farms that made up the agrarian economy of this region in North Carolina.

== Owners ==
Perciphull Campbell, Sr., was one of several Campbells who settled in the northern portion of Iredell County by the last decade of the eighteenth century; and he and his wife (Sarah Elizabeth Cook) had already begun a family that would eventually include five sons and three daughters. As early as the mid-1790s, Campbell had begun to accumulate prime lands along Hunting Creek, with two purchases at this time totaling 300 acres (120 ha).

Over the next forty years these land holdings became quite extensive and were worked by the forced labor of enslaved people. By 1815, Campbell's local prominence was evidenced by his being chosen as one of four commissioners appointed by the North Carolina legislature to lay off the newly created town of Williamsburg—the second town to be incorporated in Iredell County. It is also known that Campbell was performing marriages in the northern portion of the county during the 1820s, although it is not known whether he was acting as a minister of the gospel or (more likely) a justice of the peace. During the 1810s and 1820s Campbell added considerably to his land holdings along Hunting Creek; and his purchases during the latter decade, together with architectural evidence, suggest that the residence known as the Perciphull Campbell House was constructed during that period.

Evidence indicates, however, that Perciphull Campbell, Sr., did not remain long in the house which bears his name. On September 5, 1836, he purchased 750 acres (300 ha) of land "on Big Rocky Creek" to the south of his former residence; and the recited consideration of $4,000 (~$119,505 in 2024) indicates that the property was extensively improved at the time of its purchase. It was at this second residence that the elder Campbell established himself as a moderately prosperous planter, having acquired 21 slaves by 1850. Here it is that he died on June 6, 1853, his will referring to his land "on the Waters of Rocky Creek including the House that I now live in."

Presumably since the elder Campbell's move to Rocky Creek in the 1830s, the home place on Hunting Creek was occupied by the second and most trusted of his five sons, Perciphull Campbell, Jr. (born August 18, 1792). The younger Perciphull Campbell was named co-executor of his father's estate and continued to occupy the Hunting Creek property after the death of his father on June 6, 1853. There, with his wife Tabitha Morgan and their five children, Perciphull Campbell, Jr., established himself as a planter on a somewhat smaller scale than his father. In 1850 he was listed as the holder of ten slaves and the owner of 570 acres (230 ha), 200 of which were improved and 370 unimproved. The total cash value of the farm was put at $2,185. Principal crops were wheat, rye, oats, and corn, with the last of these heavily predominating.

On October 22, 1862, Perciphull Campbell, Jr. died, leaving, like his father before him, an estate which was long enmeshed in a web of legal uncertainty and complexity. All evidence indicates that the home place on Hunting Creek was now occupied by his widow, Tabitha, and the family of his son, L.V. Campbell. Already by 1850, L.V. Campbell had been listed as the owner of three slaves in his own right, in addition to the ten slaves owned by his father. Tabitha Campbell died on September 29, 1879, leaving the home place in the sole possession of her son. But L.V. Campbell died intestate May 20, 1888, once again leaving the Hunting Creek home place in a condition of legal limbo. His estranged widow, M.E. Campbell, and their two children, W. B. and Alice Campbell, were long engaged in disputes concerning the property. The widow, M. E. Campbell, apparently lived out the remainder of her life in the house, but it was Alice Campbell who at length came into possession of the house, and who continued to live there for nearly half a century longer. It was she who was indicated as the "Miss Campbell" living in the house when a detailed map of Iredell County was rendered in 1917.

On December 4, 1935, Alice Campbell conveyed the Perciphull Campbell home place and 139 acres (56 ha) of associated property to one L.C. Henderson, with a provision that she be permitted to occupy and enjoy the profits of the property for the remainder of her natural life. In less than two months, however, on 21 January 1936, she died in the eighty-first year of her age. At her death the Percipull Campbell home place passed forever from the Campbell family possession. The owner in 1980 was Margaret Mahaffey Cass.
