= North Carolina Highway 901 =

State highway in North Carolina, US

North Carolina Highway 901
- Memorial Highway

Route information
- Maintained by NCDOT
- Length: 19.0 mi (30.6 km)
- Existed: 1930–present

Major junctions
- South end: US 64 near Calahaln
- US 21 in Harmony; I-77 near Union Grove
- North end: NC 115 near New Hope

Location
- Country: United States
- State: North Carolina
- Counties: Davie, Iredell

Highway system
- North Carolina Highway System; Interstate; US; State; Scenic
← I-885	→ NC 902

North Carolina Highway 901 (NC 901) is a primary state highway in the U.S. state of North Carolina. The highway serves to connect the town of Harmony with nearby major highways.

== Route description ==
NC 901 is a two-lane rural highway that traverses 19.0 miles (30.6 km) from US 64, near Calahaln, to NC 115, near New Hope. Surrounded most of its journey with farmland, NC 901 is a no-thrills road through northern Iredell County.

NC 901 is a viable alternate route between Mocksville and Wilkesboro; it is shorter in mileage, though takes a few minutes longer than via US 601 and US 421.

== History ==
Established by 1930 as a new primary routing, from US 64/NC 90 to US 21/NC 26, in Harmony. In 1937, NC 901 was extended northwest to its current northern terminus at NC 115.

== Junction list ==
County	Location	mi	km	Destinations	Notes
Davie		0.0	0.0	US 64 – Mocksville, Statesville	
Iredell	Harmony	6.4	10.3	US 21 (Harmony Highway) – Jonesville, Statesville	
Iredell		11.6	18.7	I-77 – Elkin, Statesville	
Iredell		19.0	30.6	NC 115 (Wilkesboro Highway) – Wilkesboro, Statesville	
1.000 mi = 1.609 km; 1.000 km = 0.621 mi
