= North Iredell High School =

American public school in North Carolina

Location
- 156 Raider Road; Olin, North Carolina 28660; United States; 35°55′48″N 80°52′06″W

Information
- Type: Public
- Established: 1966 (60 years ago)
- CEEB code: 342973
- Principal: Teresa Hayes
- Faculty: 51.13 (FTE)
- Grades: 9–12
- Enrollment: 989 (2023–2024)
- Student to teacher ratio: 19.34
- Colors: Red and Columbia blue
- Athletics: NCHSAA 6A
- Athletics conference: North Piedmont 6A/7A
- Sports: Baseball, Cheerleading, Cross Country, Football, Golf, Soccer, Softball, Tennis, Track & Field, Volleyball, Wrestling
- Team name: Raiders
- Website: northhigh.issnc.org

North Iredell High School is public high school located in Olin, North Carolina. "North", as it is called locally, was established in 1966 as part of the consolidation of high schools in Iredell County. It is part of the Iredell-Statesville Schools district.

== Description ==
North Iredell High School is one of 10 high schools in Iredell County and is part of the Statesville-Iredell public school district. The student body is 53 percent male and 47 percent female, with a 25 percent minority enrollment in 2021. North has an 85 percent graduation rate. Twenty nine percent of the students are enrolled in Advanced Placement courses.

== Music groups ==
Musical ensembles at North include: Marching Raiders and color guard, wind ensemble, concert band, Mixed Choir, and Advanced Choir, as well as extra curricular jazz band, basketball band, and pit orchestra.

== Notable alumni ==
- Blake Crouch, author best known for his Wayward Pines Trilogy
- Matt Matheny, former college basketball head coach
