= Williamsburgh, North Carolina =

- Town
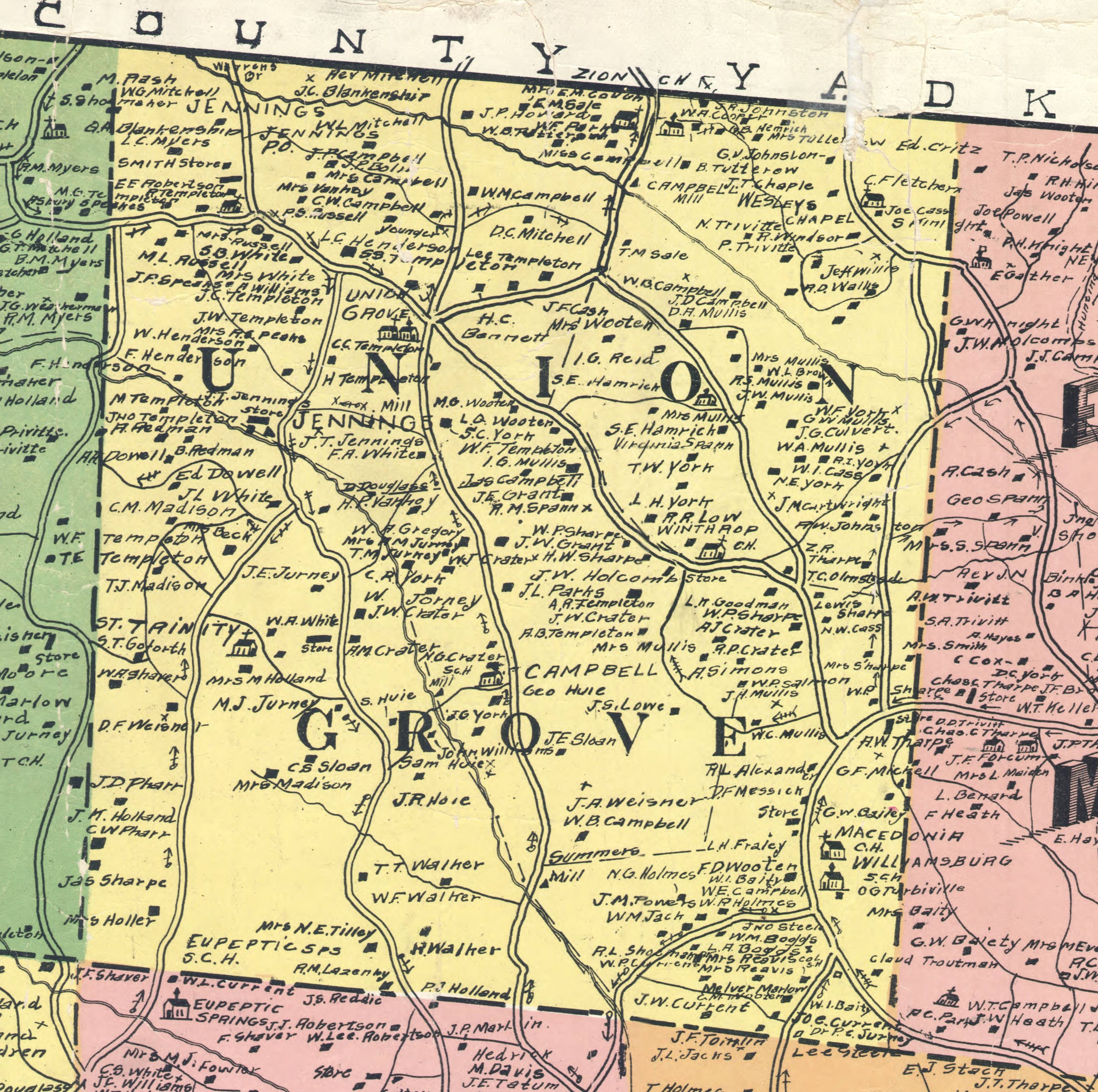
- Williamsburg was in the southeast corner of Union Grove Township (1917 map)

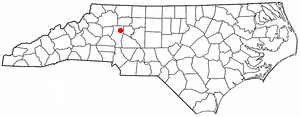
- Location of Williamsburgh, North Carolina
- Coordinates: 35°59′5.6″N 80°48′47.4″W
- Country: United States
- State: North Carolina
- County: Iredell
- Time zone: UTC-5 (Eastern (EST))
  - Summer (DST): UTC-4 (EDT)
- ZIP code: 28634
- Area code: 704

Williamsburgh (Williamsburg after 1832) was a town in north Iredell County, North Carolina from 1815 to 1971. It was the second town in Iredell County established by the North Carolina General Assembly, after Statesville, North Carolina. In the 1800s, the town contained a tavern, post office, church, and possibly a horse racing venue. Williamsburgh was located in the southeast section of Union Grove Township, which was created in 1868. The only portions of the town to survive after its charter was repealed in 1971 was the Macedonia Methodist Church (established in 1829).

== Early history ==
In the early 1800s, there was a need for a town in the north end of the Iredell County. A commission was appointed by the North Carolina General Assembly in 1815 to lay out a new town, Williamsburgh, in north Iredell County. The commissioners were Perciphull Campbell, Amos Sharpe, Reuben Morgan, and John Cowden. Williamsburg was the second town to be established by legislative act in Iredell County, after Statesville.

The town was laid off on lands owned by William Harbin and James Moody. Early land records show a King Street and Stewart Street in Williamsburg. The surveyor of the town was John Forsyth. The original purchase of lots were as follows:

- Lot 11, William Green.
- Lot 12, Asa Ball on the square of King Street and Steward Street
- Lot 13, Benjamin Johnson on the square
- Lot 14, Zachariah Albea
- Lot 17, James McConnell
- Lot 18, Abner A. Caldwell on the square
- Lot 19, Wilson Lowrance on the square

A horse racing circuit was organized in 1804 at Salisbury, North Carolina by John Steele, John McLelland and John Fulton. John McLelland purchased land in 1819–1923 in Williamsburg, supposed to be used in promoting horse racing. Tradition places the race tract east of Tabor Road, between the original graveyard, head of Dutchman, and Dolly Trivette's store lot.

Tradition places a mustering ground for the militia north west of Williamsburg, south of the Smith Road, presumably between the War of 1812 and the U.S. Civil War. They usually met for a two-week period of training along with horse racing, dancing, and other activities. The mustering ground was owned by William Harbin until the 1840s, then by Colonel Charles R. Jones and his wife, Sarah L. Jones, whose estate left the income from the property to Macedonia Church until purchased by Jesse E. Fraley in the 1870s.

John Steele was a dance hall manager in Salisbury and may have come on to Williamsburg with his partner, John McLelland, after Williamsburg was established. On June 11, 1819, a hall was located at John Howard's Assembly room. Other dance managers were H.G. Burton, Montford Stokes, and Thomas L. Cowan.

During the U.S. Civil War, General George H. Stoneman came through Williamsburgh in April 1865, after burning the cotton and tobacco factories at nearby Eagle Mills. The mill at Turnersburg was not burned because the general and mill owner were both Masons.

William Harbin gave the land where the tavern was located to form a church, Macedonia Methodist Church which continued to the 21st century. William Harbin was an early merchant of the community, operating an inn and became postmaster of Williamsburg on March 2, 1818. The name of the post office was changed to Williamsburgh after 1832. Jesse Fraley and his brother John A. Fraley had a general store in Williamsburg as early as 1842. Other pre-Civil War towns in this area included New Hope Forge (post office established in 1827) and Crater's Mill (post office established in 1851).

A petition was signed by 114 women of this area in 1847 to establish a new county by the name of William and to have a county seat of government closer than Statesville or Wilkesboro, as well as establishing a female academy. These women were joined by 99 women from southern Wilkes County. These petitions were signed in 1848 and presented to the North Carolina General Assembly of 1848-1849. Supposedly the county seat was to have been Williamsburg.

== After the Civil War ==
After the U.S. Civil War, the town of Williamsburg was overshadowed in Iredell County by the communities of Harmony and Union Grove. The post office in Williamsburg lasted until 1905. Eventually, the charter for the forgotten town of Williamsburg was repealed by the state legislature in 1971.

Many attempts were made to bring a railroad through Williamsburg between the end of the U.S. Civil War and the beginning of World War I. James Cartwright, R. Lee Alexander and others worked to bring it about. The Airline Railroad was first surveyed through Williamsburg and later was pulled and stopped at the beginning of World War I, and was never resumed. A bus line was later operated by Alan Templeton and Moody White from Union Grove through Williamsburg to Statesville.

Williamsburg School was built south of Macedonia Church in the late 1800s and continued until closed in 1929.

== Demographics ==
Post offices were used to designate persons in the 1860 U.S. Federal Census. Williamsburg was in the census district south of Hunting Creek. The census districts north and south of Hunting Creek in Iredell County included the following post offices: Williamsburg, Union Grove, Houstonville, and Eagle Mills. Union Grove and Williamsburg would become part of Union Grove Township in 1868. Houstonville and Eagle Mills would become part of Eagle Mills Township. By the time of the U.S. Civil War, Union Grove would become largest town in this area. The following table shows the breakout of the population in June 1860:

Post office	Populations	Number of Dwellings	Number of Families	Town Founded
Eagle Mills	476	92-99	85-92	1848
Houstonville	276	57	57	1789
Union Grove	841-850	161-163	155-157	1855
Williamsburg	139	38-45	38-45	1815
