= Williamsburg =

Williamsburg may refer to:

== Places ==
=== Canada ===
- Williamsburg, Ontario (see South Dundas, Ontario)

=== United States ===
- Colonial Williamsburg, a living-history museum and private foundation in Virginia
- Williamsburg, Brooklyn, neighborhood in New York City
- Williamsburg, former name of Kernville (former town), California
- Williamsburg, former name of Tehichipa, California
- Williamsburg, Colorado
- Williamsburg, Florida
- Williamsburg, Calhoun County, Georgia
- Williamsburg, Clinch County, Georgia
- Williamsburg, Dunwoody, Georgia
- Williamsburg, Illinois
- Williamsburg, Indiana
- Williamsburg, Iowa
- Williamsburg, Kansas
- Williamsburg, Kentucky
- Williamsburg, Maryland
- Williamsburg, Massachusetts
- Williamsburg, Michigan
- Williamsburg, Minnesota
- Williamsburg, Mississippi
- Williamsburg, Missouri
- Williamsburg, New Mexico
- Williamsburg, Ohio
- Williamsburg, Pennsylvania
- Williamsburg, Tennessee, now known as Burwood, Tennessee
- Williamsburg, Virginia, independent city
  - Battle of Williamsburg (1775), during the American Revolutionary War
  - Battle of Williamsburg, 1862, during the American Civil War
- Williamsburg, West Virginia
- Williamsburg, Wisconsin, a ghost town

== Other uses ==
- Williamsburg (film), a 2006 independent American satirical drama
- "Williamsburg" (song), a song on Armor For Sleep's 2007 album Smile For Them
- Williamsburg (yacht), a presidential yacht
- "Williamsburg", nickname for the right field bleachers at Fenway Park during the ballplaying career of Ted Williams

== See also ==
- Williamsburgh (disambiguation)
- Williamsburg Township (disambiguation)
- Williamsburg County, South Carolina
- Williamsburg Bridge, in New York City
