= Charles A. Reynolds =

American politician (1848–1936)

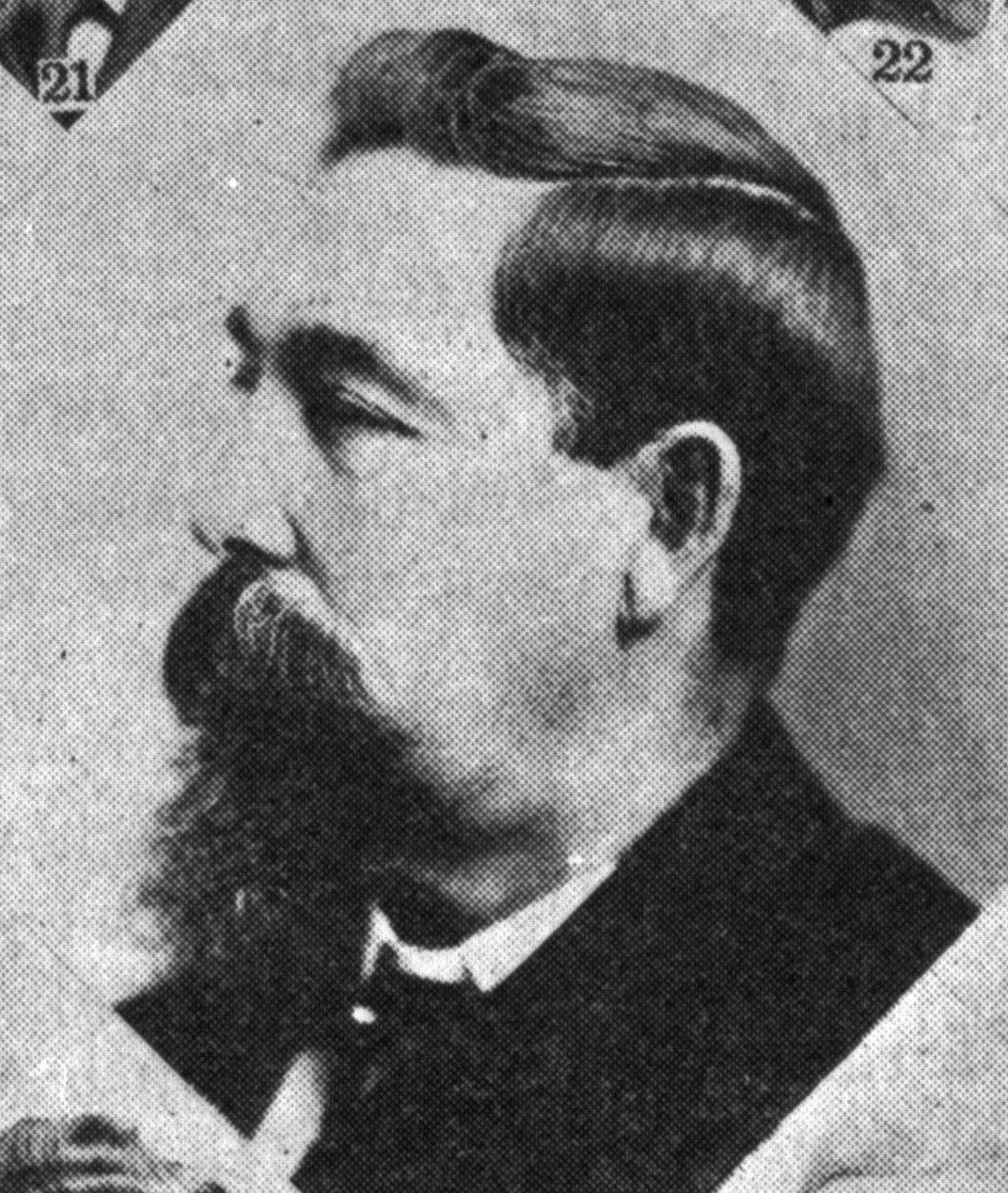

8th Lieutenant Governor of North Carolina
- In office 1897–1901
- Governor: Daniel Lindsay Russell
- Preceded by: Rufus A. Doughton
- Succeeded by: Wilfred D. Turner

7th Governor of Albay
- In office 1905–1907
- Preceded by: Ramon F. Santos
- Succeeded by: Domingo S. Samson

Personal details
- Born: November 10, 1848 Madison, North Carolina, U.S.
- Died: July 2, 1936 (aged 87) Colfax, North Carolina, U.S.
- Party: Republican
- Spouse: Carrie Watkins Fretwell (m. 1873)

Charles Albert Reynolds (November 10, 1848 – July 2, 1936) was a civil engineer and North Carolina Republican politician who served as the eighth lieutenant governor of North Carolina from 1897 to 1901 under Governor Daniel L. Russell. Limited to one term in office by the state constitution of the time, Reynolds later ran unsuccessfully for the U.S. House of Representatives in North Carolina's 5th congressional district in 1904 and 1906 (losing both times to William W. Kitchin). He is buried in the churchyard of the Episcopal Church of the Epiphany in Eden, North Carolina.

== Early life ==
Reynolds was born on November 10, 1848, to Thomas Reynolds and Sarah Jane Fewel in Madison, North Carolina. He attended The University of North Carolina and later studied engineering at Princeton University from 1868 to 1870, but did not graduate from either.

== Personal life ==
Reynolds married his wife, Carrie Watkins Fretwell, on 18 May 1873. They had one child named Frank. He died in Colfax, North Carolina, on July 2, 1936.

== Sources ==
- The Political Graveyard
- OurCampaigns.com

Party political offices
Preceded by James M. Moody	Republican nominee for Lieutenant Governor of North Carolina; 1896	Succeeded by Herbert F. Seawell
Political offices
Preceded by Rufus A. Doughton	Lieutenant Governor of North Carolina; 1897–1901	Succeeded by Wilfred D. Turner
