= Perciphull Campbell =

Planter miller Williamsburgh Union Grove settler

- Born: 1767; Culpeper, Colony of Virginia
- Died: June 6, 1853 (aged 85–86) home on Rocky Creek, Iredell County, North Carolina, US
- Occupations: planter, miller
- Known for: early settler in north Iredell County, commissioner establishing Williamsburgh, North Carolina, justice of the peace
- Spouse: Sarah Elizabeth (Cook) Campbell

Signature
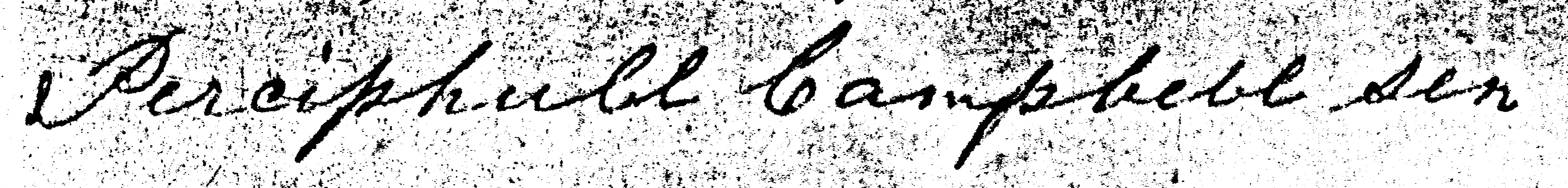

Perciphull Campbell, Sr. (1767–1853) was one of the original settlers prior to 1778 in north Rowan County, Province of North Carolina. This area later would become Iredell County, North Carolina, in 1788 and after his death it became Union Grove Township in 1868. He was a moderately prosperous land owner, planter and miller, who migrated from Culpeper County, Colony of Virginia to the Province of North Carolina with his family before the U.S. Revolutionary War in which his two older brothers served. He was a justice of the peace and active in the formation of the town of Williamsburgh in north Iredell County. His home and mill that he built on Hunting Creek in about 1820, as well as the Campbell family cemetery, near what is now the unincorporated town of Union Grove, are listed on the National Register of Historic Places. The house and cemetery have survived into the 21st century but the mill and covered bridge near the mill were destroyed in the late 1930s.

== Early life in Virginia and move to North Carolina ==
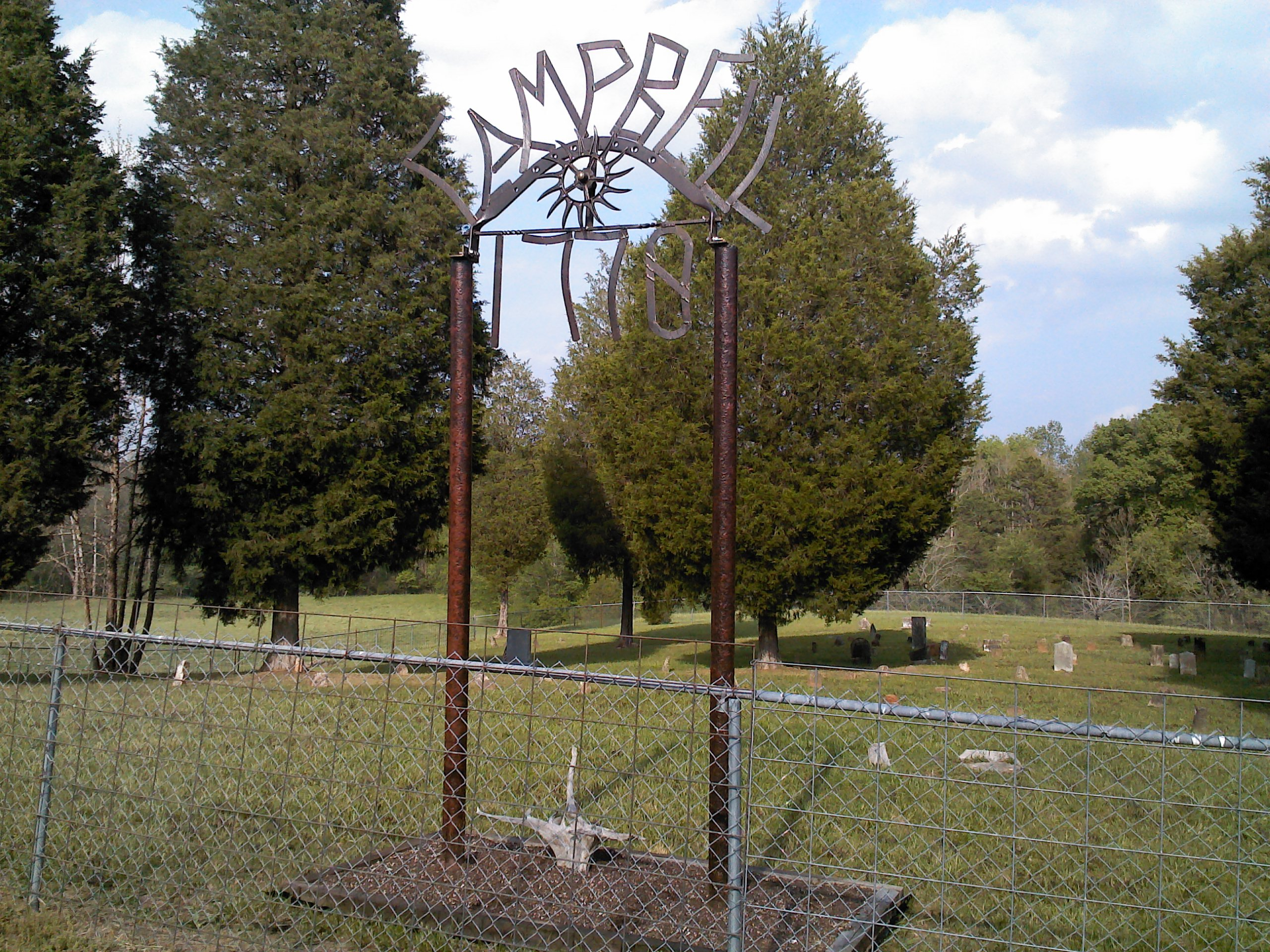
Campbell Family Cemetery near Union Grove, Iredell County, North Carolina

Perciphull Campbell was born on April 13, 1767, in Culpeper County, Colony of Virginia. He was the son of Adam Campbell and Sarah (Morgan) Campbell, who were Scotch-Irish immigrants and were married in Culpeper County in about 1753. Sometime prior to 1775, Adam Campbell migrated with his family from Culpeper County to Rowan County, where he purchased a 300-acre tract of land on the north and south side of Hunting Creek near the Wilkes and Surry County lines. This area, which would become Iredell County in 1788, contains the Campbell Family Cemetery which is a historic landmark and may be the site where Adam was buried when he died in about 1783.

Perciphull was the youngest child of six known children of Adam and Sarah that were all born in Culpeper County:

1. Keziah Campbell (1758–1845): She married Henry Horne Hayes in North Carolina. After his death in 1815, she moved to Hancock County, Indiana, with her children. She died in Brownsville Township, Hancock County in 1845.
2. William R. Campbell (August 1, 1756–1846): William served in the American Revolution. He was in the Surry County Regiment (1775–1776), as a private under Capt. John Hamlin and Col. Martin Armstrong. In 1780, he was a private under Capt. Benjamin Herndon (Wilkes County Regiment) in the Salisbury District Brigade when commanded by Col. William Lee Davidson. In 1780, he was also a private under Capt. Jacob Nichols in the Rowan County Regiment of the North Carolina militia. In May 1781, he was a private under Capt. Alexander Brevard (1st North Carolina Regiment) for 12 months. He was discharged on April 28, 1782, as a shoemaker attached to the 3rd North Carolina Regiment) at the Continental Shoe Factory in Rowan County. William Campbell sold his land on the north side of Hunting Creek to Thomas Huey of Iredell County, North Carolina in 1801. He was living in Garrard County, Kentucky at the time of this sale. He later moved to Crawford County, Indiana.
3. John Campbell (1759–1834): John also served in the Revolutionary War. He was a private in the Rowan County Regiment (1779–1780) in Captain Jacob Nichols' company and later in Captain John George Lowman's company. In 1780, he was a private in the companies of Captain Benjamin Herndon, Captain Joel Lewis, and Capt. William Nall. He was taken as prisoner of war at the Battle of Camden, South Carolina and later escaped. He moved to Wilkes County after the war. John married Cora Mullis (about 1759–1858) in Wilkes County after the war in 1785. John received a pension for his service in 1834. In 1843, Cora received a widow's pension for John's Revolutionary War service. Perciphull Campbell and his son, Theophilus Campbell helped Cora obtain this pension in 1843 (pension file number W-6616)
4. Mary Polly (Campbell) Coleman (1760–1834): She married Charles Coleman in 1781 in Wilkes County, where she died in 1834.
5. Sarah (Campbell) Ball (1763–1834): She married William Jonas Ball in 1788 in Iredell County and died in Wilkes County.
6. Perciphull Campbell (1767–1853): He married Sarah Elizabeth Cook in 1788 in Iredell County, where they remained the rest of their lives.

Genetic Y-DNA analysis in 2025 of known descendants of Adam Campbell showed that Adam Campbell's Haplogroup was R-FTG668. This DNA analysis and analysis of records from early Rowan County revealed two additional children that were born in North Carolina after 1774:

1. possibly Malinda Mae (Campbell) Wood (1776-1838), who married Miller A. Wood (1769-1838)
2. Theophilus Marion Campbell (1777-1855), who moved to Madison County, Alabama after the War of 1812

Perciphull's name has been recorded several different ways on official documents—including P. Campbell, Sr. (most common), Purcival, Percephull, Penniful, and John Pierce. In his will, which was probably written by him or by his son (Perciphull Campbell, Jr.), the spelling appears to be "Perciphull. His son was referred to as either Perciphull Campbell, Jr. or Perciphull Campbell, Esq. The given name John Pierce is common in his ancestors.

== Chronology of events in the life of Adam and Perciphull ==
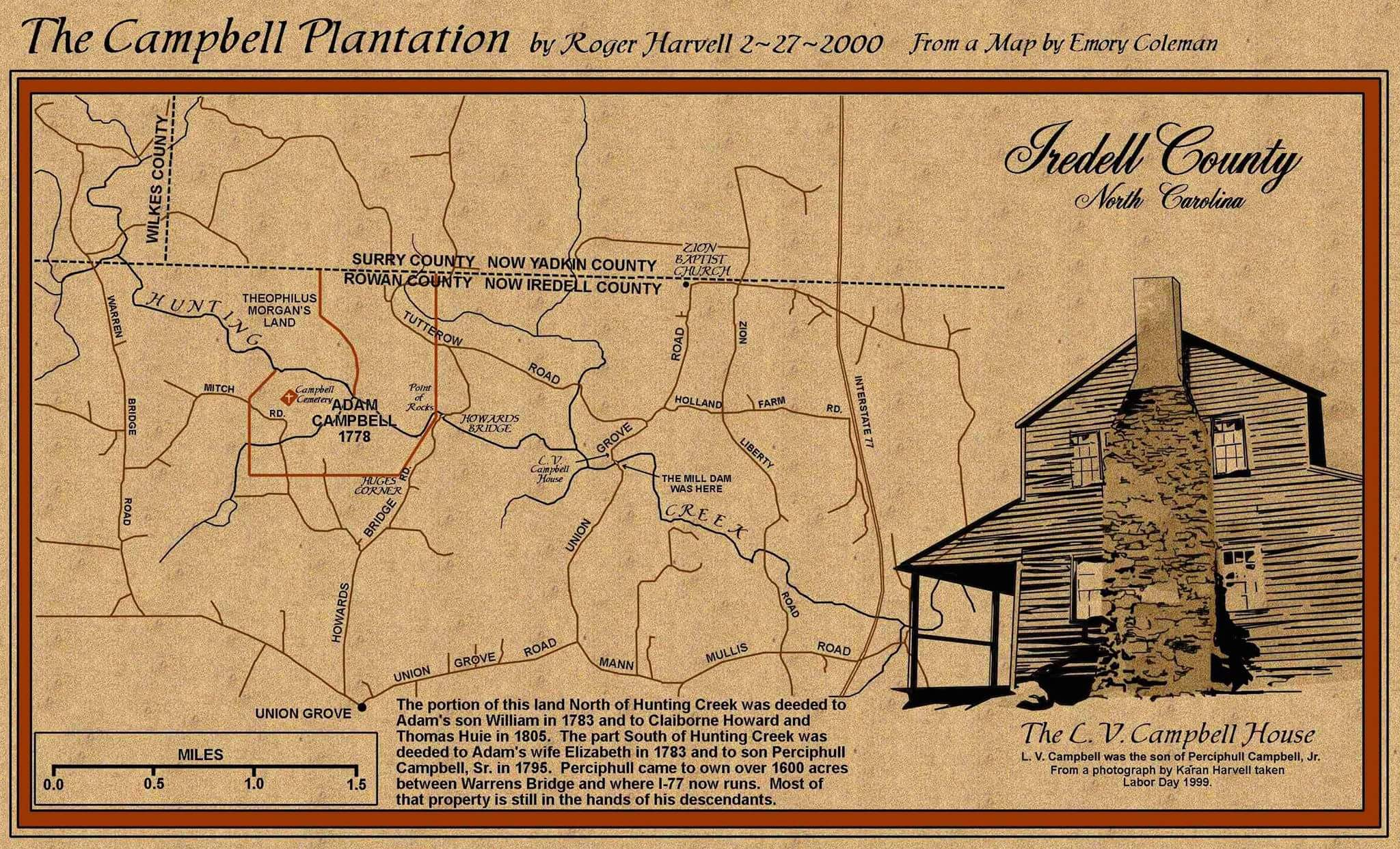
Perciphull Campbell, Sr. house in north Iredell County showing early property lines, his grandson of his son Perciphull Campbell, Jr., L.V. Campbell, later inherited this property. Map created by Roger Harvell from early land records.

The following events show the chronology of Perhciphull's father, Adam Campbell, and Perciphull as they left Virginia and moved to North Carolina. These events are documented in court records, land transactions, the Revolutionary War pension application of his brother John and John's widow Corah, application for National Historic Site of the Perciphull Campbell House and Campbell Cemetery, and books about the history of Rowan County and Iredell County. They are listed here to help understand this chronology and how it fits together.

- April 22, 1763, Adam Campbell was listed three times in the County Court Minute Book of Culpeper County, Virginia 1763–1764 (Culpeper County was formed in 1749 from Orange County). The subject of the court cases is not known.
- April 1, 1778, John Henderson filed a State Land Grant (vacant land entry) in Rowan County, North Carolina, for 200 acres on the south side of Hunting Creek adjoining Adam Campbell's land to the south and the rest vacant land. This was the first record of Adam Campbell in North Carolina.
- August 4, 1778, Theophilus Morgan (a neighbor and in-law of Perciphull) filed a State Land Grant in Rowan County, North Carolina, for 150 acres on north side of the South Fork of Hunting Creek including his improvement and adjoining the Surry County line
- 1778, Theophilus Morgan (a neighbor and in-law) obtained a State Land Grants for 239 acres on the north side of Hunting Creek, entered in 1778, issued in 1783
- August 31, 1778, Adam Campbell filed a State Land Grant in Rowan County, North Carolina for 300 acres on both sides of the Hunting Creek adjoining Theophilus Morgan's conditional line between him and Peter Good and James Woodburn at the point of rocks, including his own improvement. This would imply Adam was there before 1778.
- September 4, 1778, William Campbell (Perciphull's oldest brother) obtained a State Land Grant for 175 acres on the north side of Hunting Creek, entered on September 4, 1778, issued on October 10, 1783.
- September 30, 1778, James Woodburn filed State Land Grant No. 1613 in Rowan County, North Carolina for 300 acres on both sides of South Fork of Hunting Creek adjoining Adam Campbell at the point of Rocks running North to Surry County line adjoining Nathaniel Munsey at the first hollow below the mouth of Buck Shoal including the improvement where he now lives.
- November 18, 1778, Adam Campbell was listed in Captain Nichols District in the 1778 Tax List with an estate valued at 529 Pounds. Adlai Osborne compiled this Tax List of Rowan County land owners to raise money for the upcoming Revolutionary War, including Capt Caldwell's, Capt Nichols', Capt Falls', and Capt Purviance's Districts that would become part of Iredell County in 1788. John Campbell served with Captain Nichols in the Rowan County Regiment.
- May 25, 1779, William Taylor filed a State Land Grant for 100 acres in the fork of the Rocky Branch of Hunting Creek adjoining Adam Campbell. This land was later transferred to Martin Morgan.
- October 10, 1779, Elizabeth Campbell (Adam's wife) obtained a State Land Grant for 200 acres on the south side of Hunting Creek, entered on October 10, 1779, issued on October 10, 1783. This probably indicated that Adam Campbell had died between 1779 and 1783.
- December 25, 1779, James Woodburn filed a State Land Grant in Rowan County, North Carolina, for 400 acres on the waters of Hunting Creek adjoining Adam Campbell and his own land
- October 10, 1783: State Grant Book 9, pages 468 and 470, Elizabeth Campbell and her oldest son William Campbell received land grants for the same lands that Adam Campbell had filed for in his land entries. Adam Campbell died sometime between December 1779 and October 10, 1783, in Rowan County, North Carolina, now north Iredell County, and he is probably buried at the Campbell Family cemetery on the land.
- In 1784 or 1785, Perciphull was present in Wilkes County, North Carolina at the marriage of his brother, John Campbell.
- 1788, Perciphull married Sarah "Sallie" Elizabeth Cook in Rowan County (November 3, 1788, it became Iredell County)
- November 3, 1788, Iredell County was created from Rowan County
- June 5, 1795, Perciphull Campbell bought 100 acres of land on a creek in Iredell County from Elizabeth Campbell for 20 pounds currency. This was his first land holding.

== Perciphull and Sarah's children ==
Perciphull Campbell married Sarah Elizabeth Cook (1767–1848) in 1788 in Rowan County (probably in the area that became Iredell County in 1788), North Carolina. Perciphull and Sarah Campbell had the following children (all born in Iredell County):

1. William R. "Billie" Campbell (1790–1844): He married Jensie Jane Morgan in about 1810 and moved to Tennessee and then Izard County, Arkansas, before 1840.
2. Perciphull Pierce Campbell, Jr. (1792–1862): He married Tabitha Morgan (1797–1879) in about 1814 and remained in Iredell County.
3. Captain Theophilus Marion "Othie" Campbell (1797–1855): He married Tabitha Renee "Arena" Allen (1816-abt 1880) in about 1832. He served in the War of 1812. Arena and her children moved to Izard County, Arkansas in about 1850 without Theophilus. Theophilus was the Iredell County representative to the North Carolina House of Commons in 1836–1837. He acquired considerable debt which he had to pay off with his father's inheritance, which he sold to debtors for one dollar.
4. John R. Campbell (1802–1872): He married June Lucy Williams (1815–1901) in about 1835. He lived out his life in Iredell County.
5. Sarah Sallie Campbell (1805–1864): She married Bartlett Morgan (1800–about 1862) in about 1824, son of a neighbor Theophilus Morgan
6. Mary "Polly" Campbell (1806–1844): She married Gabriel B. Parks (1807–after 1880) in about 1824
7. Frances "Fanny" Campbell (1809–1846): She married Milas Dobbins (1800–1862) in 1827
8. William Rutherford Campbell (1813–1883): He married Mary (Polly) Howard (1815–1894) in 1835; moved to Izard County, Arkansas

Two of his children, Billie and William Rutherford Campbell, as well as Theophilus's estranged wife, Tabitha, moved to Izard County, Arkansas before the Civil War. Life was very hard on people in Izard County during the Civil War due to tremendous destruction, isolation, and failing crops. However, the family that remained in North Carolina were still in touch with those that attended the Campbell family reunion in Union Grove, North Carolina in 1925. The rest of his children remained in north Iredell County and neighboring Wilkes County, North Carolina.

== Growth of Perciphull's estate ==
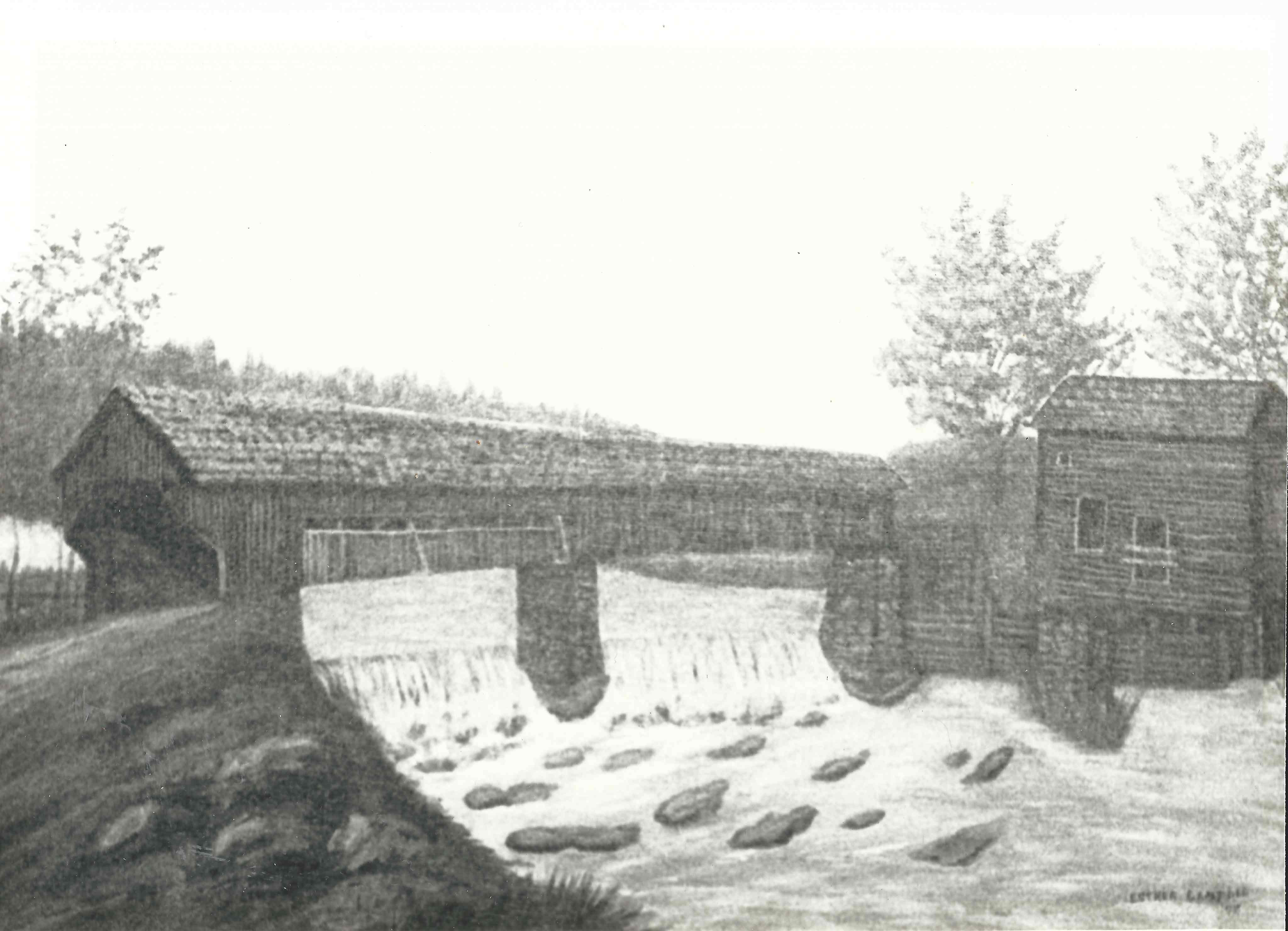
Campbell Bridge and Mill on Hunting Creek

Perciphull was too young (age nine in 1776) to be a soldier in the American Revolution. Adam Campbell's land north of Hunting Creek was deeded to his son William R. in 1783, probably upon Adam's death. That land was deeded to Claiborne Howard and Thomas Huie later in 1805 when William moved west. Adam's land south of Hunting Creek was deeded to his wife, Elizabeth in 1783, where she probably lived with Perciphull and his sister, Sarah, until she married. This land was deeded to Perciphull in 1795. On this land, he began to build a moderately prosperous plantation, including house and mills on the Hunting Creek in the early 1800s. He gradually accumulated slaves to help run the plantation and mills. By 1850, he owned 21 slaves.

Perciphull accumulated a considerable estate during his lifetime. According to deeds on file in the Iredell County Courthouse, Perciphull Campbell bought an additional 1,081 acres of land north and south of the Hunting Creek and on the waters of the Rocky Branch between 1798 and 1836.

- May 15, 1798, Peciphull bought land on a creek bank near points of rock and Lunceford's line from Elizabeth Campbell
- 1819, Perciphull bought several tracts of land (250, 151, 20 acres) on Hunting Creek
- May 10, 1822, Perciphull bought additional 160 acres of land on Hunting Creek from Alexander Hall and Stephen Sharpe for $200 and
- 1829, Perciphull bought a parcel of land on Hunting Creek from Martin Morgan for $100
- 1836, Perciphull bought 750 acres on Big Rocky Creek for $4,000. Perciphull Campbell, Sr. lived here until his death. His home on Rocky Creek was later called the J.P. Bolin homeplace. His son, Perciphull Campbell, Jr. occupied his home and mill on Hunting Creek after his father moved to Rocky Creek.

Perciphull Campbell was a justice of the peace in Iredell County. In this capacity, he was able to perform marriages. In a local poll, six of the couples that he married were known to be pro-Andrew Jackson in the presidential election of 1828.

On September 8, 1843, Perciphull sold two acres of land on Hunting Creek for $10 to a committee of Iredell County School District Number 4 for the purpose of building a free school. School District 4 was located on the north side of Hunting Creek.

=== House and mills ===
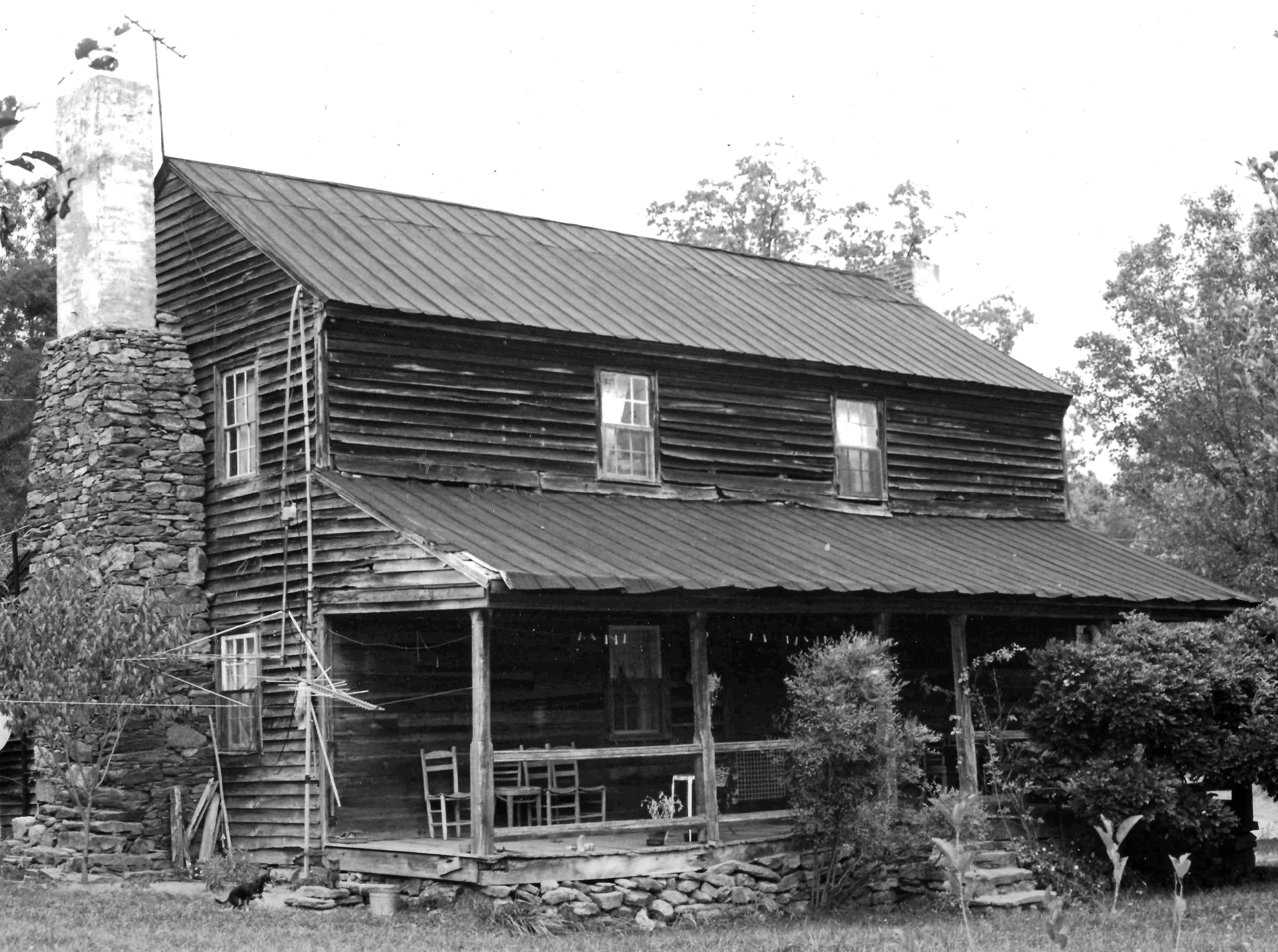
Perciphull Campbell House in 1981

Perciphull built his first home on Hunting Creek in about 1820. This property included a smoke house, main house in the I-frame style, grist mills powered by the Hunting Creek using tubs, slaves, and later a covered bridge over the Hunting Creek. The principal crops on the estate were wheat, rye, oats, and corn (most widely produced).

When Perciphull died, his oldest living son, Perciphull Campbell, Jr. inherited the Hunting Creek house and mill. Perciphull Campbell, Jr. lived there with his wife, Tabitha, from 1836 until his death in 1863. After Perciphill Campbell, Jr.'s death, his wife Tabitha lived on the estate with their oldest son, Leolin V. Campbell. Leolin died intestate in 1888 and the estate was first owned by his estranged wife, Margaret Emma (Buxton) Campbell. After she died in 1864, the estate passed to his daughter by his first marriage, Alice Campbell, who lived there until she died in 1939. Although the mill was a working mill into the 20th century, few remnants remain. The house on Hunting Creek was still occupied in 2019. The covered bridge was still there in the late 1930s and was the last covered bridge in Iredell County. After Alice's death, the estate was no longer owned by Perchiphull Campbell's descendants. Perciphull, Sr. and Jr., Leolin, and Alice Campbell are all buried at the Campbell Family cemetery near the unincorporated town of Union Grove.

There was severe flooding in Iredell County in August 1848 that left only three mills operating–the Campbell Mill, Jennings mill, and the Diffy Mill.

=== Slaves ===
Perciphull did not own any slaves in 1790. However, he owned one slave in 1800, four slaves in 1810, one slave in 1820, and two slaves in 1830. After his house and mills were completed and operating, he acquired more slaves and owned up to 26 slaves and was one of larger slave owners in Iredell County. When his will was written in 1844, he owned 24 slaves and 1,600 acres of land (including more than one mill), as well as $204 in cash. In 1850, his estate was valued at $5,000 and he owned 21 slaves.

He was enumerated in the 1850 U.S. Census with his grandchildren Theophilus Parks and John P. Parkes, children of his daughter Mary Polly (Campbell) Parks who married Gabriel B. Parks. In this census, Perciphull's birthplace was listed as Virginia and the value of his real estate was listed at $5,000. His wife, Sarah, had died on February 28, 1848, and he was a widower.

The 1850 U.S. Slave Schedule for Iredell County lists two P. Campbells. One (probably Perciphull, Sr.) with 21 slaves (slave ages one to 55 years) and one (probably Perciphull, Jr.) with 10 slaves (slave ages ten to 45 years). Other family members with slaves in 1850 included: his grandson L.V. Campbell (3 slaves), his grandson Milton Campbell (9 slaves), his grandson Williamson Campbell (1 slave), his son John R. Campbell (one slave). and his son in law B. Morgan (two slaves). In the 1860 Slave Schedule his sons owned slaves: P. Campbell owned 10 slaves and John R. Campbell owned three slaves. His son in law, Bart Morgan, owned 7 slaves. His grandsons also owned slaves: Milton Campbell owned 11 slaves; L.V. Campbell owned three slaves; Williamson owned six slaves

Little is known about the lives of the Campbell family slaves. His slaves were passed to his living children in his will written in 1844:

- Perciphill Campbell, Jr. inherited slaves named Big Issac, Susannah, Marian, and Canah
- Theophilus M. Campbell inherited slaves named James, Peter, Silvey, and Andrew
- John R. Campbell inherited slaves named Nelson, Betty, Lee and Marandy
- Sarah (Campbell) Morgan inherited slaves named Huldy, Jane, Eli, Catherine, Emily and Sarah.
- Frances (Campbell) Dobbins inherited slaves Miry and Little Isaac
- William Rutherford Campbell inherited slaves Bryant, Frany, Burton, and Rachel

Additional slaves sold after his death included: Stephen, Lawson and Jincy sold to Williams R. Campbell; Jack and Lucky sold to B. Morgan; Sally and Silas sold to John R. Campbell; Charley sold to Joseph James; Enos sold to Noah Cline; and Martha and Sarah sold to John P. Parks.

Some of the slaves continued to stay in the area. When the slaves were emancipated after the Civil War, the female slave named Hulda (born in June 1824) took the last name Morgan and was living near the Campbell mill in Union Grove in 1870 with three young boys (Jack, Dick and Burton Morgan). She later moved to Statesville, North Carolina, where she was living in 1900 with her son Jackson. Nothing is currently known about the other slaves. The female slave, Catherine, also took the last name Morgan and was a domestic servant in the house of William Buxton and Ema (Buxton) Campbell (Leolin V. Campbell's estranged wife) in 1870.

== Founding of the town of Williamsburg ==
Perciphull lived in an area that was about 20 miles north of Statesville, the first town in Iredell County. Statesville was created on the site of the old Fourth Creek Congregation in 1789. The earliest church in the area where Perciphull lived was Grassy Knob Baptist Church (established in 1794), where he was amongst the first members according to the church history. The nearest town of any size was Houstonville, established by Christopher Houston as the second Iredell County town in 1789 and a post office was established there in 1804. Christopher Houston thought the north end of the county needed a town. However, Christopher moved to Tennessee in 1815 and the town of Houstonville never became more than a small community.

There was a need for a town in the north end of the county. With his growing stature as a successful planter, Perciphull was chosen as one of the commissioners appointed by the North Carolina General Assembly in 1815 to lay out a new town, Williamsburg, in north Iredell County. The other commissioners were Amos Sharpe (brother of William Sharpe, Reuben Morgan (son of Theophilus Morgan), and John Cowden. Williamsburg was the second town to be established by legislative act in Iredell County. The town was laid off on lands owned by William Harbin and James Moody. Early land records show a King Street and Stewart Street in Williamsburg. A post office was established in Williamsburg in 1817 with William Harbin as postmaster. There is some evidence that a tavern owned by William Harbin existed in Williamsburg before 1830 and there are family traditions of a horse racing circuit near the town. William Harbin gave the land where the tavern was located to form a church, Macedonia Methodist Church which continued to the 21st century. Jesse Fraley and his brother John A. Fraley had a general store in Williamsburg as early as 1842. Other pre-Civil War towns in this area included New Hope Forge (post office established in 1827) and Crater's Mill (post office established in 1851). After the U.S. Civil War, the town of Williamsburg was overshadowed by the communities of Harmony and Union Grove. Most of Perciphull's descendants that remained in North Carolina lived closer to Union Grove and Harmony. The post office in Williamsburg lasted until 1905. Eventually, the charter for the forgotten town of Williamsburg was repealed by the state legislature in 1971.

== Religion and death ==
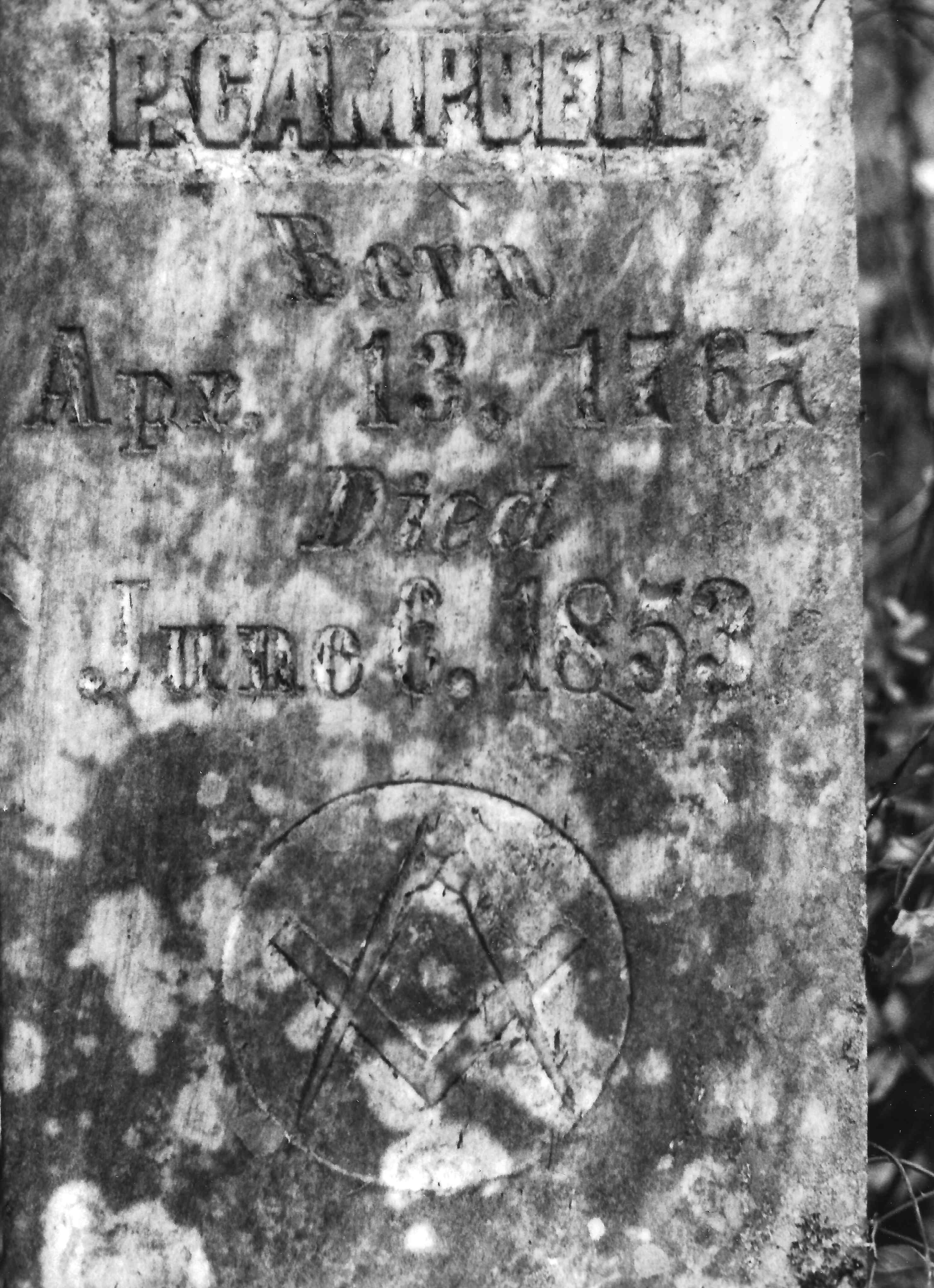
Tombstone of P. Campbell (born Apr 13, 1767, died June 6, 1853) Masonic Symbol

Perciphull Campbell died on June 6, 1853, and was buried in the Campbell Family Cemetery, along with his wife who predeceased him. According to Perciphull's tombstone inscription, he was a Mason. He was a Baptist and worshipped at the Grassy Knob Baptist Church (established in 1794), which was the only church in the area before 1800. Zion Baptist Church, near Union Grove, was established on June 4, 1825. His descendants have and continue to worship at both churches.

== Descendants ==
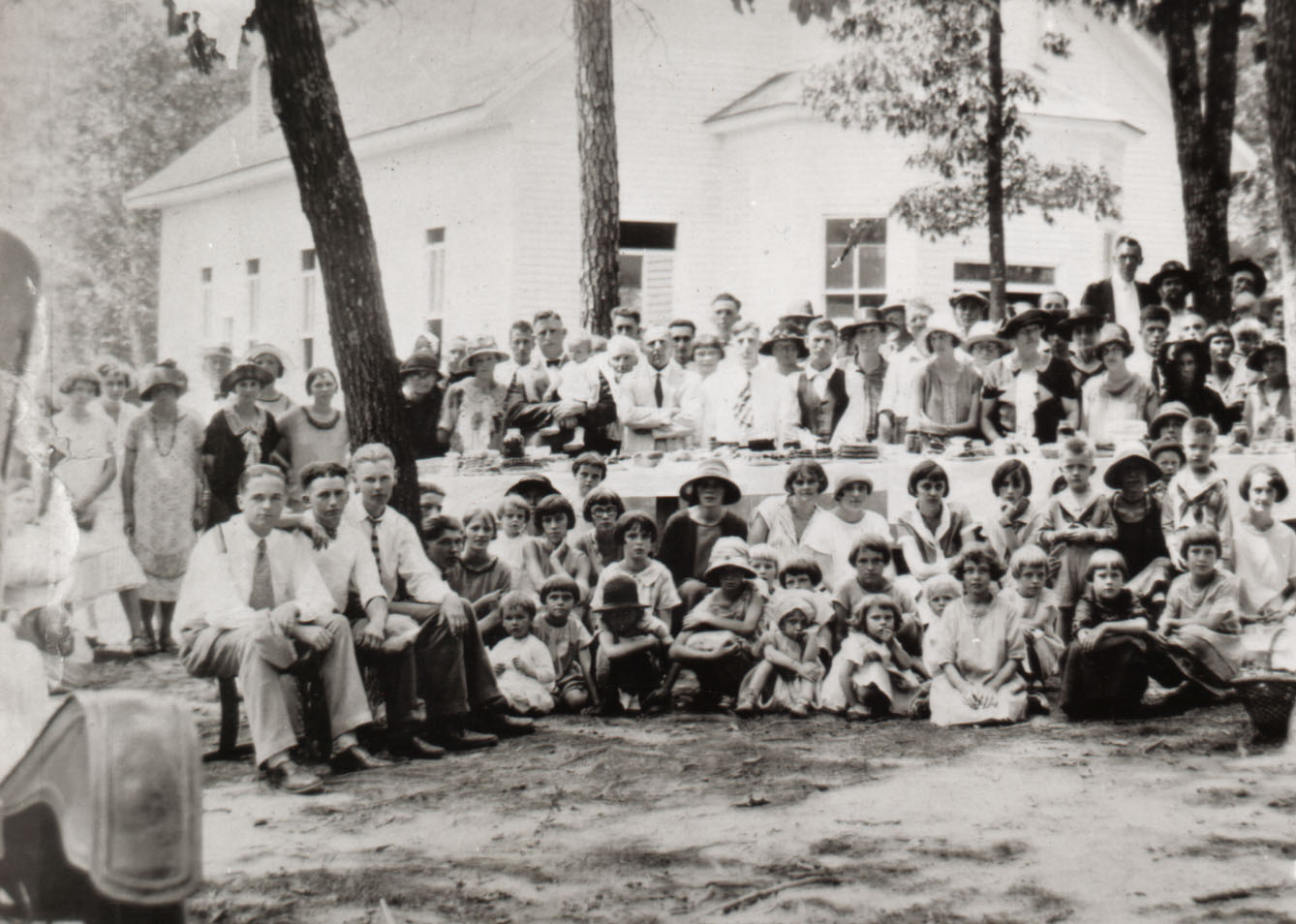
1925 Campbell Family Reunion, Union Grove, North Carolina

After Perciphull's death on June 6, 1853, some of the descendants of Perciphull Campbell continued to live and work in Union Grove Township well into the 21st century. Beginning in 1925, the Campbell family began a tradition of family reunions and documented the history of the Campbell family descended from Perchipull Campbell. There were between 2,000 and 2,500 people at this first reunion. Through 1925, the family that remained in Union Grove Township continued to correspond with relations that had moved to Izard County, Arkansas before the U.S. Civil War. The History of the Campbell Family was compiled in 1925 by Henry Pierce Van Hoy using locally available property records, wills, and oral traditions. (He was a descendant of Sarah Campbell, daughter of John R. Campbell, who married William A. Van Hoy.) It was given out at the first annual Campbell family reunion in Union Grove, Iredell, North Carolina. Later generations using modern genealogical methods with greater access to records of the time of Adam Campbell and his descendants have verified and added to the history in the 1925 history.
