= Olin, North Carolina =

- Unincorporated community
- Olin in 2025

- Location within North Carolina Location within the United States
- Coordinates: 35°57′09″N 80°50′23″W
- Country: United States
- State: North Carolina
- County: Iredell
- Established: 1858
- Elevation: 912 ft (278 m)
- Time zone: UTC-5 (Eastern (EST))
  - Summer (DST): UTC-4 (EDT)
- ZIP code: 28660
- Area code: 704
- GNIS feature ID: 991630

Olin is an unincorporated community located in Olin Township, Iredell County, North Carolina, United States. The community is 12 miles (19 km) north of Statesville. The Olin post office was first established in 1852, and continues to operate with the ZIP code 28660.

== History ==
The Olin Creek, also knowns as the Middle Fork of Rocky Creek, is near where the New Institute post office was established on August 12, 1852. On February 14, 1856, this was renamed the Olin post office, after Stephen A. Olin, founder and first president of Randolph-Macon college (1832–1836). The first postmaster of Olin was William D. Watts (February 14, 1856).

The town of Olin had a prohibition of the manufacture and sale of liquor written into its charter.

After Olin Township was established in 1868, Olin remained a town.

Olin United Methodist Church and Cemetery, founded in 1851, is located in Olin.
