= Morrison–Campbell House =

Historic house in North Carolina, United States

- U.S. National Register of Historic Places
- Location within North Carolina Location within the United States
- Location: Harmony, North Carolina
- Coordinates: 35°58′0″N 80°44′4″W
- Built: c. 1860
- Architectural style: Late Greek Revival
- MPS: Iredell County MRA
- NRHP reference No.: 80002853
- Added to NRHP: 1980

Morrison–Campbell House is a historic home located near Harmony, Iredell County, North Carolina, United States. It was built about 1860 by James E. Morrison. The house was later sold to Columbus Wilford Campbell (1846–1915). It is a two-story, three bay by two bay, Late Greek Revival style frame dwelling. It has a shallow gable roof, exterior brick end chimneys, and a one-story hip roofed front facade porch. Also on the property is a contributing log smokehouse built in 1880.

It was added to the National Register of Historic Places in 1980.
