= Williams Township =

Williams Township may refer to the following places:

- Williams Township, Lonoke County, Arkansas
- Williams Township, Sangamon County, Illinois
- Williams Township, Calhoun County, Iowa
- Williams Township, Hamilton County, Iowa
- Williams Township, Bay County, Michigan (Williams Charter Township, Michigan)
- Williams Township, Aitkin County, Minnesota
- Williams Township, Benton County, Missouri
- Williams Township, Stone County, Missouri
- Williams Township, Wayne County, Missouri
- Williams Township, Chatham County, North Carolina
- Williams Township, Columbus County, North Carolina
- Williams Township, Martin County, North Carolina
- Williams Township, Kidder County, North Dakota
- Williams Township, Nelson County, North Dakota
- Williams Township, Dauphin County, Pennsylvania
- Williams Township, Northampton County, Pennsylvania

See also

- Williams (disambiguation)
