= Turnersburg, North Carolina =

- Unincorporated community
- Location within North Carolina Location within the United States
- Coordinates: 35°54′30″N 80°48′26″W
- Country: United States
- State: North Carolina
- County: Iredell
- Elevation: 768 ft (234 m)
- Time zone: UTC-5 (Eastern (EST))
  - Summer (DST): UTC-4 (EDT)
- ZIP code: 28688
- Area code: 704
- GNIS feature ID: 1006394

Turnersburg is an unincorporated community in Iredell County, North Carolina, United States. The community is located on U.S. Route 21, 9.8 miles (15.8 km) north-northeast of Statesville. Turnersburg has a post office with ZIP code 28688.

The town of Turnersburg was created in 1858. The unincorporated community of Turnersburg has been within the boundaries of Olin Township since townships were created in 1868 to conform with the North Carolina constitution. There is also a Turnersburg Township, which is east of Olin township.
