= Union Grove Township, Iredell County, North Carolina =

Union Grove Township
- Township
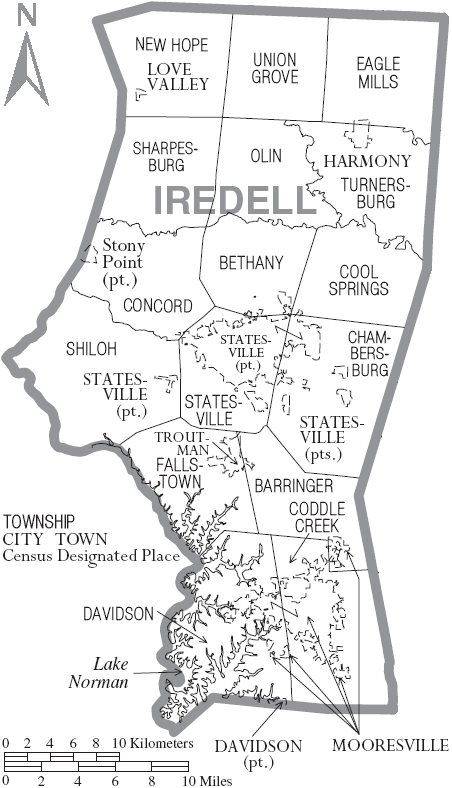
- Union Grove Township in Iredell County

- Location within North Carolina Location within the United States
- Coordinates: 36°1′28″N 80°51′59″W
- Country: United States
- State: North Carolina
- County: Iredell
- Established in: 1868

Government
  - Type: non-functioning county subdivision

Area
  - Total: 31.13 sq mi (80.6 km^{2})
  - Land: 30.92 sq mi (80.1 km^{2})
  - Water: 0.21 sq mi (0.54 km^{2})

Population (2020)
  - Total: 2,355
  - Density: 76.16/sq mi (29.41/km^{2})
- Time zone: UTC-5 (Eastern (EST))
  - Summer (DST): UTC-4 (EDT)
- ZIP code: 28689

Union Grove Township is a rural, non-functioning county subdivision established in 1868 in Iredell County, North Carolina, United States. Two towns have existed in Union Grove township: 1) the unincorporated community Union Grove, established in 1857 and 2) the former town of Williamsburg established in 1812. The Union Grove Post Office was established in 1857. In 2019, within the unincorporated town of Union Grove is the Union Grove Milling Company, Union Grove School (formerly Union Grove elementary through high school), Union Grove Volunteer Fire House, and two Methodist churches. In the later half of the 20th century, Union Grove was famous for the Fiddler's Convention which was held in Union Grove from the 1920s to 1970s. The Fiddler's Convention was originally established to benefit the Union Grove school.

== Geography ==
Union Grove Township is located on a scenic spot with a view of the Blue Ridge, Brushy Mountains, and the pinnacle of Pilot Mountain some 60 miles away. The center of the town of Union Grove is located at 36°01′28″N 80°51′59″W (36.024400, -80.86639). The center of Union Grove township is located at 36.00867730, -80.85436970. Union Grove Township is in the north-central area of Iredell County. It is bordered by Eagle Mills Township to the east, New Hope Township to the west, Olin Township and Turnersburg Township to the south, and Yadkin County and Wilkes County to the north.

Interstate 77 runs north–south and North Carolina Highway 901 runs east–west through the township.

Bodies of water flowing through Union Grove Township include Hunting Creek, Rocky Creek, Owens Branch, Camel Branch, and Brushy Creek.

== Demographics ==
The area that is now Union Grove Township was first settled in the late 1700s. Early settlers included Campbell, Mullis, Morgan, Howard, and Tutterow families. The first town in the area was Williamsburg, which had a post office from 1812–1827 and from 1832–1905 with the name Williamsburgh.

Historical population
Census	Pop.	Note	%±
1860	945		—
1870	1,034		9.4%
1880	1,221		18.1%
1900	1,295		—
1910	1,314		1.5%
1920	1,444		9.9%
1930	1,482		2.6%
1940	1,576		6.3%
1950	1,443		−8.4%
1960	1,263		−12.5%
1970	1,115		−11.7%
1980	1,412		26.6%
1990	1,672		18.4%
2000	2,069		23.7%
2010	2,170		4.9%
2020	2,355		8.5%
U.S. Decennial Census; 2020

Post offices were used to designate persons in the 1860 U.S. Federal Census. The area that became Union Grove Township in 1868 included the census districts north and south of Hunting Creek in Iredell County. This area included the following post offices: Williamsburg, Union Grove, Houstonville, and Eagle Mills post offices. Houstonville and Eagle Mills would become part of Eagle Mills Township. Before the U.S. Civil War, Union Grove was the largest town in this area. The Union Grove post office was called Craters Mills until December 21, 1857. John Templeton was postmaster of Craters Mills from September 17, 1851, until December 21, 1857. The following table shows the breakout of the population of these towns in June 1860:

Post office	Populations	Number of Dwellings/Houses	Number of Families	Date founded
Eagle Mills	476	92-99	85-92	1848
Houstonville	276	57	57	1789
Union Grove	841-850	161-163	155-157	1857
Williamsburg	139	38-45	38-45	1815

The inhabitants of the area that became Union Grove in the early 1800s and Union Grove Township in 1868 were farmers and some also ran mills. By 1850, some farms grew larger, as evidenced by the number of slaves and size of the families. In 1850, Perciphull Campbell owned 21 slaves. In 1860, Hosea Redman on Rocky Creek owned 30 slaves. After the Civil War, the 1870 Census shows that there were only 70 "colored" men and women out of a total population of 1,034 in Union Grove Township. There was only one foreign born resident in 1870, a farmer's wife from England named Sophia Low. There were 281 inhabitants in the U.S. Census of 1860, including 242 in district North of Rocky Creek-Union Grove post office area and 39 in the Williamsburg district-Williamsburg post office area.

=== Demographic makeup in 2000 ===
As of the census of 2000, there were 2,069 people, 775 households, and 579 families residing in the Union Grove township. There were 849 housing units at an average density of 57 units per square mile (22 units/km^{2}). The racial makeup of the town was 92.2% White, 3.2% Black or African American, 0.1% Native American, 0.5% Asian, <1% Pacific Islander, 3.4% from other races, and 0.5% from two or more races. 5.5% of the population were Hispanic or Latino of any race.

There were 775 households, out of which 74.7% had children under the age of 18 living with them, 61.8% were married couples living together, 8.4% had a female householder with no husband present, and 25.3% were non-families. 36.1% of all households were made up of individuals, and 8.0% had someone living alone who was 65 years of age or older. The average household size was 2.61 and the average family size was 3.02.

In the township the population was spread out, with 24.2% under the age of 18, 7.6% from 18 to 24, 30% from 25 to 44, 24.6% from 45 to 64, and 13.6% who were 65 years of age or older. The median age was 38.0 years. For every 100 females, there were 104 males. For every 100 females age 18 and over, there were 101 males.

The median income for a household in the township was $43,284, and the median income for a family was $46,134. Males had a median income of $31,906 versus $24,340 for females. The per capita income for the town was $18,321. About 4.8% of families and 8.0% of the population were below the poverty line, including 5.2% of those under age 18 and 22.2% of those age 65 or over.

== History ==
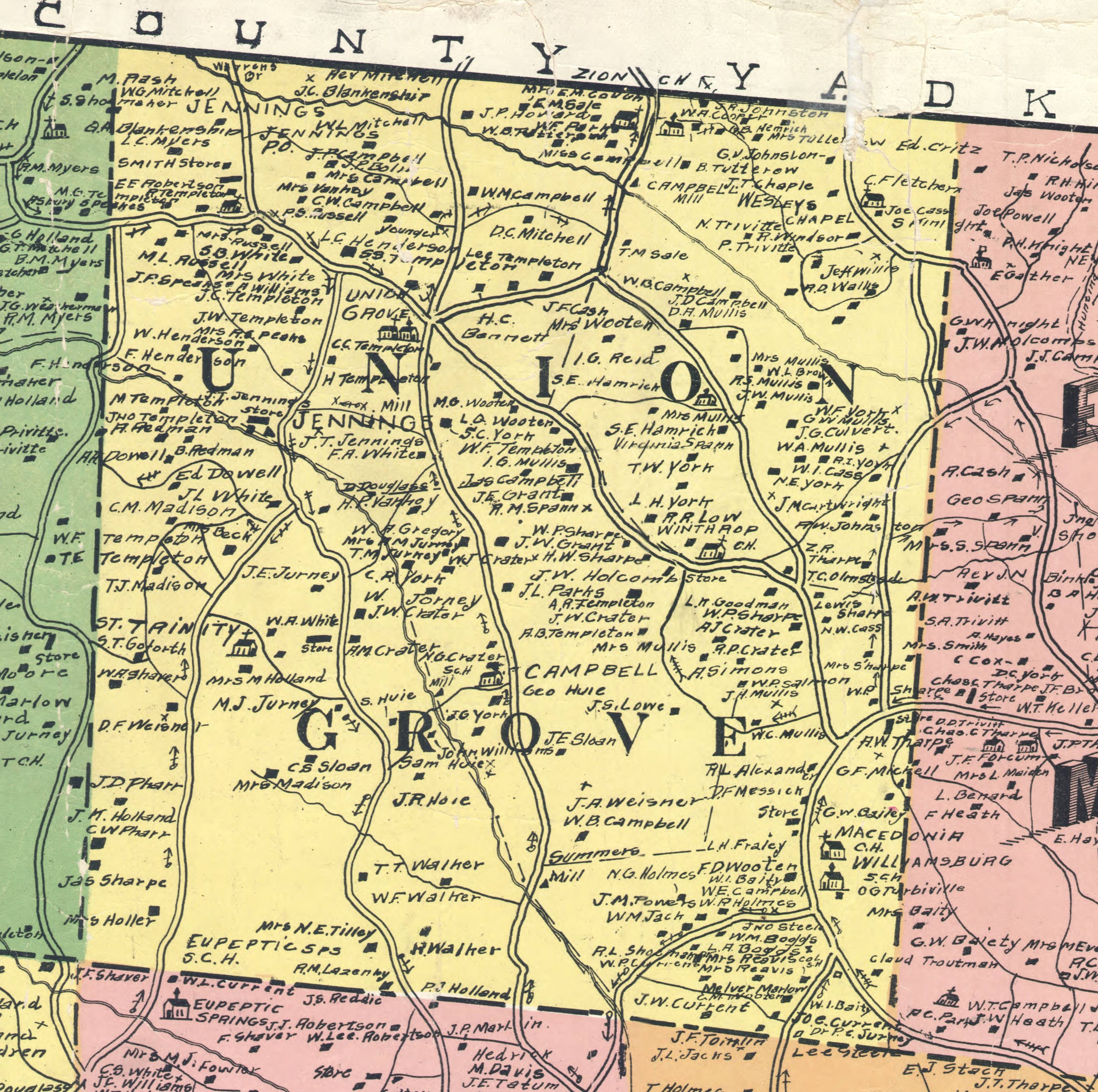
Map of Union Grove Township in 1917

The area that is now Union Grove Township was a favorite spot with the Native Americans before early settlers. Many Native American artifacts have been found in the area, especially a site near Jennings mill known as Indian Hill.

Several mills were built on the Hunting Creek in the south and Rocky Creek in the north, the two main streams in Union Grove Township. The mills were used as both a grist mill and saw mill. Mills in the area included the following:

- Campbell Mill on Rocky Creek built by Perciphull Campbell in 1820, see also Perciphull Campbell House, added to the National Register of Historic Places in 1980.
- Old Brothers Mill built before 1848, later the site of the Weisner mill;
- Diffy Mill built before 1848, later the site of the Robertson mill.
- Rev. Quentin Holten Mill built about 1850. Jennings mill was built on the site of the Holten mill. This mill, originally built by Sandy Hall and Sampson Ball, included a corn grist mill first, and later a sash mill was added.
- About 1880, John R. Huey built a mill several miles down Rocky Creek from the Jennings mill to grind wheat and corn, as well to saw lumber.
- Union Grove mill, an electric-powered mill in Union Grove built in the 1900s

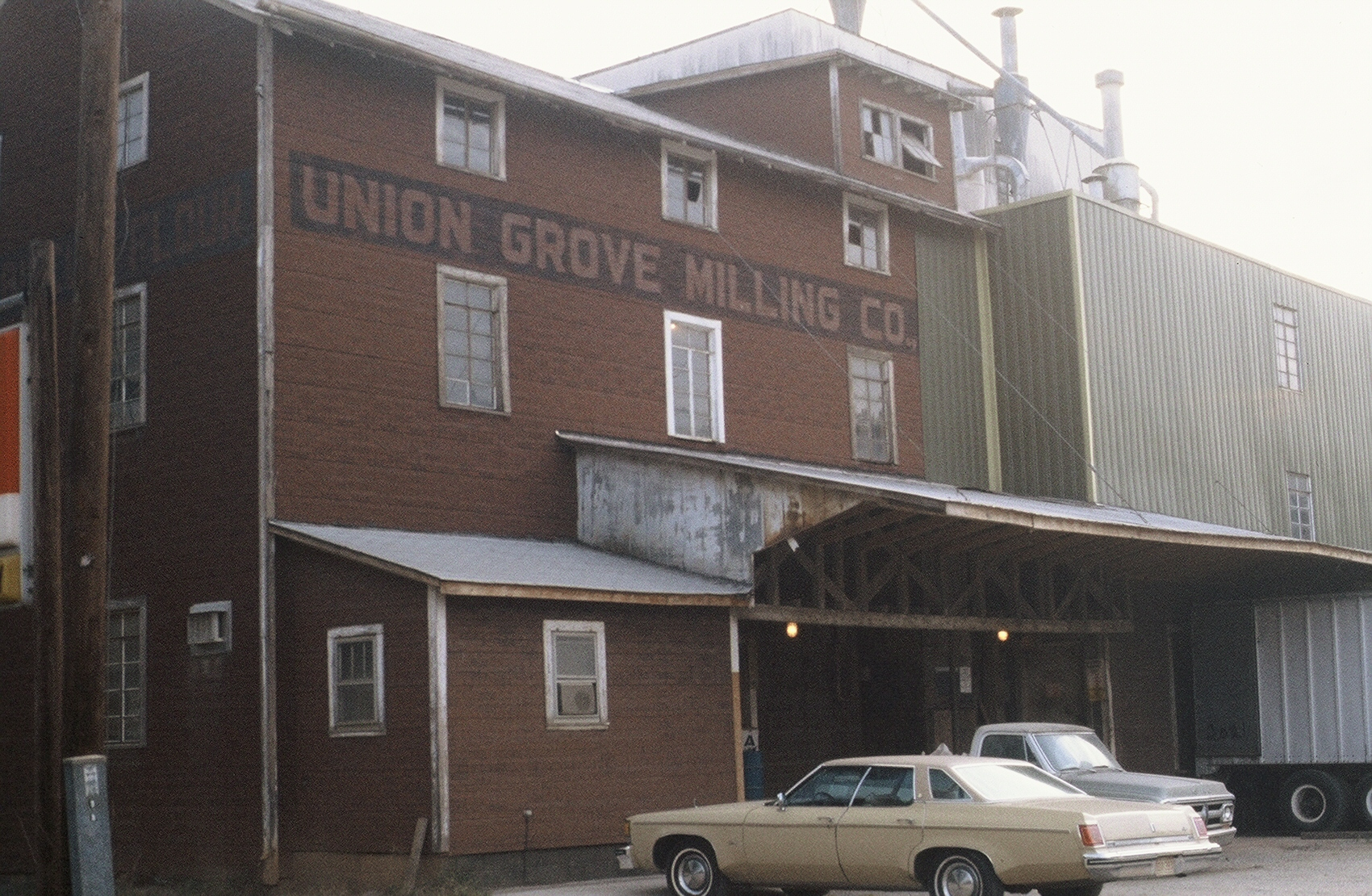
Union Grove Milling Company in 1982

Severe flooding in the area in 1848 left only three mills in operation in North Iredell County, the Campbell mill on Rocky Creek, the Jennings mill, and the Diffy mill.

The community churches grew up around the mills, two towns, and concentration of inhabitants. The following churches are within Union Grove township:

- Barker's Grove Baptist Church
- Cavalry Baptist Church
- Friendship Baptist Church
- Grassy Knob Baptist Church, founded in 1794, within New Hope Township, Union Grove Post Office
- Macedonia United Methodist Church, in Williamsburg in 1829
- Moss Chapel was named after Rev. William Moss, who died in 1826. Rev. Moss was a Circuit Riding Methodist preacher from Brunswick County, Virginia, founded in 1799
- New Friendship Church, Baptist, founded in 1896
- Smith Chapel
- Sweet Home Baptist Church, founded in 1886, located nearby in Osborneville in Wilkes County
- Union Grove Christian Church
- Union Grove United Methodist, founded on September 23, 1846, Tradition says that Union Grove referred to the church meeting place in the grove where the church members met.
- Wesley Chapel, formerly Bush Hill Methodist Church, founded on August 8, 1868
- Winthrop Friends Meeting, Quaker, established in the 1870s
- Zion Baptist Church, founded on June 4, 1825, organized in the Douthit School House, which stood within 75 feet of the present Zion Church building—just north of the Campbell Mill site on Rocky Creek. The Douthit School, established in the 1830s in a log cabin, was a subscription school.

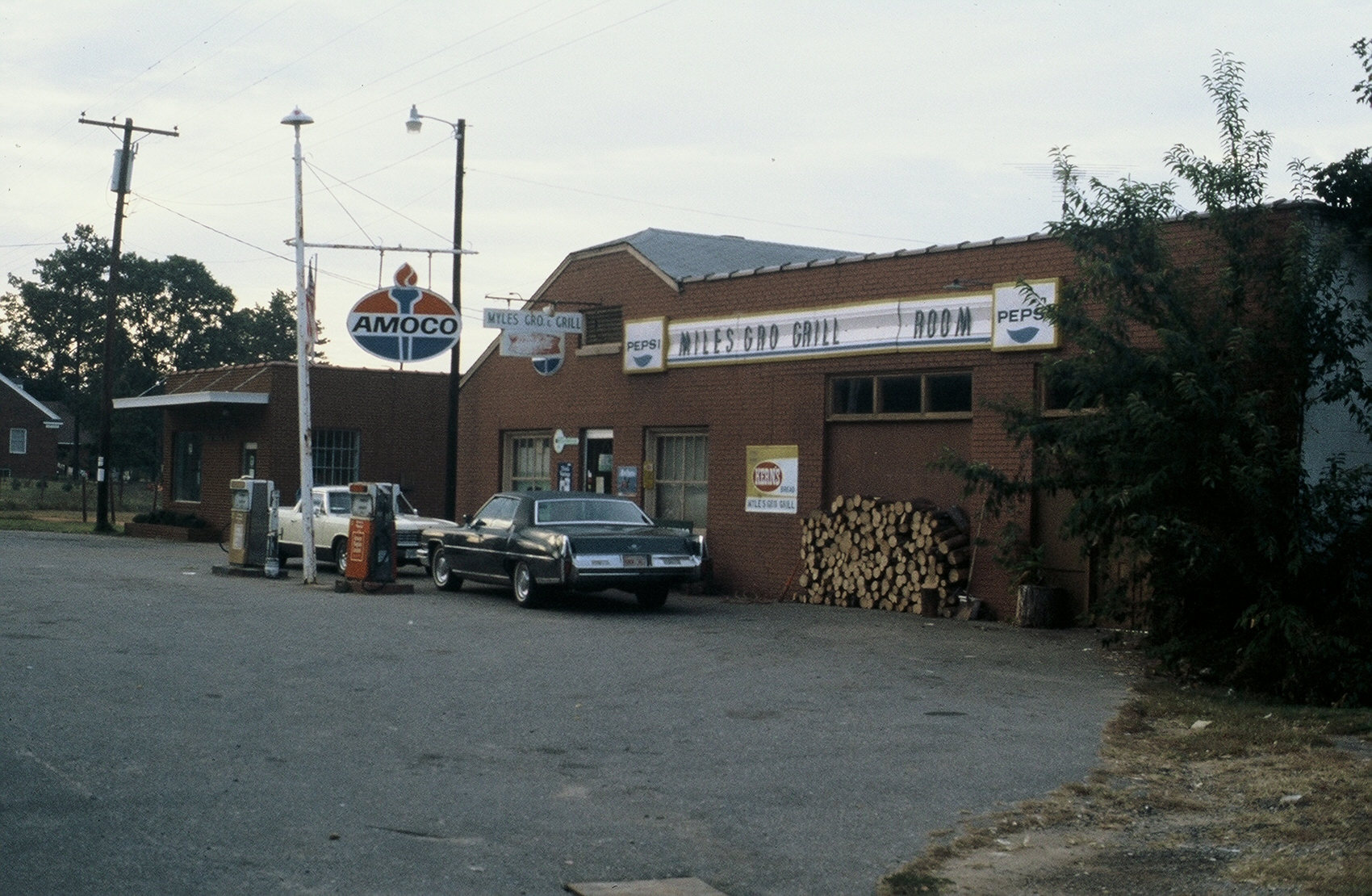
Center of Union Grove Township showing Miles Grocery, filling station and Post Office in 1982.

The earliest known store in the area was operated on the John Howard farm, two miles north of Union Grove, by Jacob Fraley. Prior to the Civil War, Mr Fraley moved his store to Union Grove. Jesse E. Fraley and John A. Fraley operated a store in Union Grove around 1844. Jacob Fraley was Postmaster of the Union Grove Post Office on December 21, 1857.

By the requirements of the North Carolina Constitution of 1868, the county was divided into townships. Previous to that time, the subdivisions were Captain's Districts. While the Captain's Districts referred primarily to the militia, it served also for the election precinct, the tax listing and tax collecting district. Union Grove Township was named after the Union Grove postoffice in the center of that township. Union Grove Township has been used since 1870 as a census district.

The longest operating commercial activity in the area is the Jenning store, which is located one and one-half miles south of Union Grove. This store was originally operated by Rev. Quentin Holton about 1850. In 1886, Mr. John Myers and the Rev. T.L. Jennings founded a mercantile business on this site. Rev. Jennings son, J.T. Jennings, purchased the store from his father.

In the later 1800s or early 1900s, Union Grove citizens founded the Union Grove School. The earliest records show that in 1905 the average attendance was 50. There was only one teacher and the salary for one month was thirty dollars. The first schoolhouse was a one-room frame building. For the first time, the Union Grove school opened on September 14, 1925, with 67 high school students. The high school continued until 1966 when high schools in Iredell County where consolidated. The elementary and junior high students remained at Union Grove School, until 1991, when a consolidated middle school opened.

== Fiddlers' convention ==
The Union Grove Old Time Fiddlers' Convention founded in 1924 by H. P. VanHoy and friends, as a fund raiser for the school. Held annually on the school grounds every Easter weekend, the Fiddlers' Convention was a popular community event that brought many area old-time fiddlers into the small unincorporated town of Union Grove to compete. With the folk music revival in the 1950s and 1960s, however, this small-town community event became increasingly popular with young people who would travel great distances to attend. The unconventional lifestyles of some of these young people disturbed many residents of the conservative farming community. The "Woodstock generation" generated huge crowds to Union Grove, thus overwhelming the community's resources. After the 1969 Convention (and after Woodstock) the county school board asked that the event be moved off school grounds. Thus the decision on where to relocate the Fiddlers' Convention came down to the two sons of H. P. VanHoy. Pierce VanHoy was the oldest son and program director of the convention. Harper VanHoy (younger brother) was the Secretary and Treasurer. They disagreed on how to proceed and thus, went their separate ways creating two distinct "Fiddlers' Conventions."

Fiddler's Grove, an old-time-music and family-oriented campground, was developed on land purchased near the school by Harper Van Hoy and his wife, Wanona, in 1970. From the beginning, Fiddler's Grove was envisioned as the site for the annual fiddling competition. Central entertainment events at Fiddler's Grove have been the Old Time Fiddler's & Bluegrass Festival, a spring fiddling competition held annually since 1970, and the Square-Up, a fall clogging dance competition held until 1982.

Pierce Van Hoy was the program director and the main promoter of the convention. He felt that it should be promoted as their father, the founder, intended. He held his event on his farm and retained the original name of "World's Championship Old-Time Fiddlers' Convention," with the blessings and support of their father. Financially committed to Fiddler's Grove, Harper Van Hoy felt it was important to focus on the music and the community by creating a family atmosphere and enforcing a ban on alcohol and illegal drugs. He called his event the Old Time Fiddler's & Bluegrass Festival and received early support from Doc Watson, Lee and Jean Shilling, Alan Jabbour, and Allein Stanley, JP Fraley, and Fred Coon, among others. While the World's Championship Old-Time Fiddlers Convention attracted large crowds and was immediately financially successful, Harper Van Hoy's Ole Time Fiddler's & Bluegrass Festival deliberately stayed small, despite early financial losses, by implementing an invitation-only attendance policy in 1973. Both fiddling events were held simultaneously in Union Grove over Easter weekends. After newspaper accounts erroneously reported drug-related incidents and other problems occurring at the Old Time Fiddler's & Bluegrass Festival instead of the World's Championship Old-Time Fiddlers Convention, Harper Van Hoy moved his festival to Memorial Day weekend in 1974 to distance it from his brother's festival.

Fiddler's Grove continued to host the Old Time Fiddler's & Bluegrass Festival on Memorial Day weekend along with a number of other events. The Festival's commitment to the preservation and perpetuation of old-time music is particularly reflected in its special competition categories of Certified Old-Time Fiddler (fiddlers 55 years and older who play strictly by ear with no formal violin training) and Heritage Tune (in which the fiddler must not only perform but tell the origin and story of an old tune). The Square-Up, an annual dance competition, held over Labor Day weekend was an institution at Fiddler's Grove until 1982. This dance competition featured traditional mountain, precision, and smooth clogging teams as well as individual buck and flatfoot dancers. Fiddler's Grove and the Old Time Fiddler's & Bluegrass Festival were nominated in the Local Legacy category by Senator Jesse Helms as part of the Library of Congress Bicentennial in 2000.

The Pierce VanHoy farm was acquired by Casey VanHoy (the late Pierce VanHoy's youngest son) and converted into an entertainment facility and RV Park - The VanHoy Farms Family Campground. In 2012, Casey decided to restart the World's Championship Old-Time Fiddlers' Convention, under the name Union Grove Fiddlers' Convention. The convention was a success - thus returning to its pre - "Woodstock generation" days, with a much smaller family oriented setting.
