= Eagle Mills Township, Iredell County, North Carolina =

Coordinates: 36°00′28″N 80°45′03″W

Eagle Mills Township
- Township
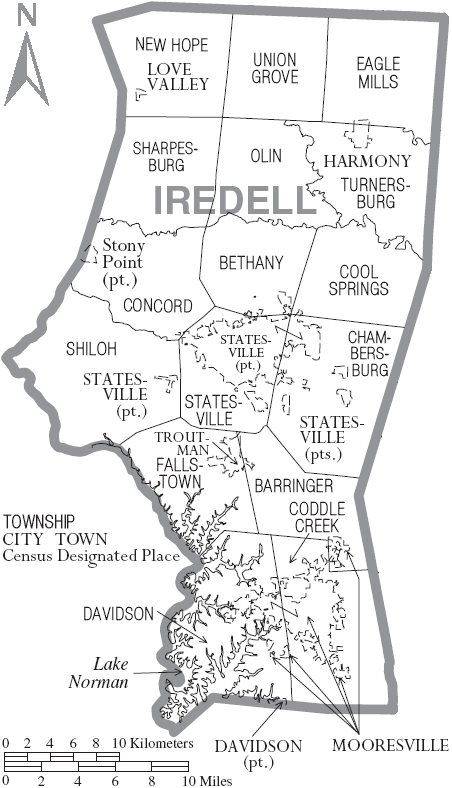
- Eagle Mills Township in Iredell County
- Country: United States
- State: North Carolina
- County: Iredell
- Established: 1868

Government
  - Type: non-functioning county subdivision

Area
  - Total: 38.64 sq mi (100.1 km^{2})
  - Land: 38.34 sq mi (99.3 km^{2})
  - Water: 0.3 sq mi (0.78 km^{2})

Population (2020)
  - Total: 1,758
  - Density: 45.85/sq mi (17.70/km^{2})
- Time zone: UTC-5 (Eastern (EST))
  - Summer (DST): UTC-4 (EDT)

Eagle Mills Township is a rural, non-functioning subdivision of Iredell County, North Carolina, United States. By the requirements of the North Carolina Constitution of 1868, the counties were divided into townships, which included Eagle Mills. Eagle Mills Township was named for the town of Eagle Mills (also referred to as Eagle City for a time), which was established by Andrew Baggerly on Hunting Creek in 1848.

== History of Eagle Mills ==
In 1846, Andrew Baggerly bought land on Hunting Creek in north Iredell County. He constructed a dam and built a sawmill and grist mill, and started construction of a factory building. He put an ad in Salisbury's Carolina Watchman newspaper that read, "the most valuable water power in the Southern Country … situated on Hunting Creek in Iredell County, twenty-eight miles west of Salisbury … [on] a never-failing stream, … remarkable for its purity, … [and] adapted to the manufacture of paper, to calico printing, to bleaching etc." By 1852, William I. Colvert was operating a knitting mill in Eagle Mills. It had 700 spindles and 12 looms and employed an overseer and 22 workers, 20 of whom were women. In 1854, Baggerly was calling the site Eagle City. Baggerly was forced to sell his interests in Eagle Mills to William Colvert during the Panic of 1857. “According to tradition there was a tobacco factory, hotel, oil mill, and general store at Eagle Mills in addition to the grist mill and cotton factory. A number of homes stood in the horseshoe bend above the mills and a church was eventually constructed on the edge of the settlement.” During the Civil War, Stoneman's raiders burned Eagle Mills to the ground. After the war, the mills were rebuilt but Eagle Mills never returned to its former splendor. A fire in April 1894 destroyed the rebuilt mills and only the foundations remained. Some gravestones still remain.

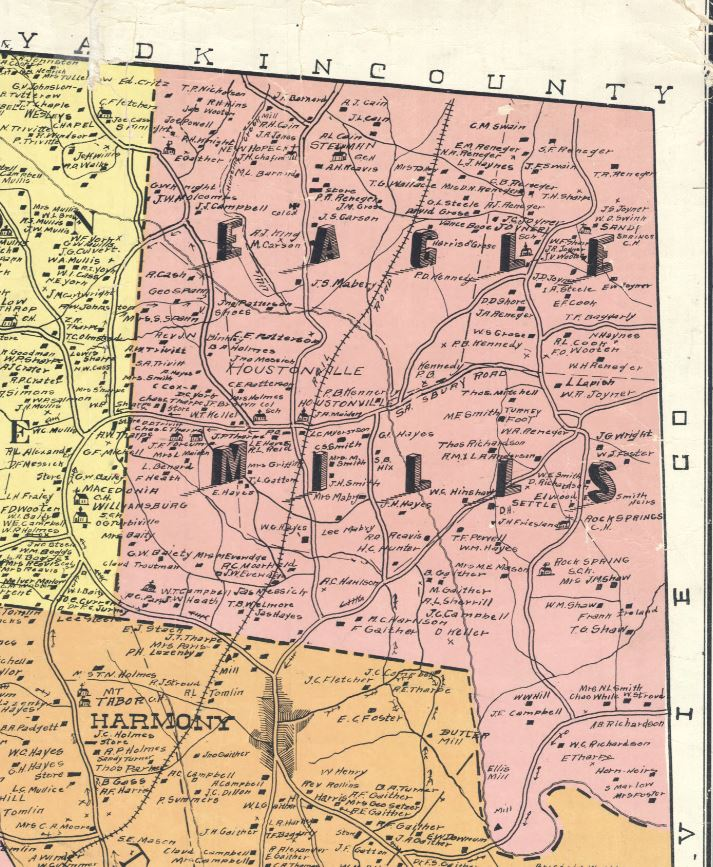
Eagle Mills Township, from map of Iredell County created in 1917, showing names of land owners, churches and schools

Andrew Baggerly was the post master when the Eagle Mills post office was first established on August 3, 1848. This post office continued until September 29, 1894 when the name was changed to Eagle post office with Arthur L. Stimson as post master. The Eagle post office continued until November 15, 1907. There are currently no post offices in Eagle Mills Township. The Harmony post office is used.

== Geography ==
Eagle Mills Township is in the northeastern corner of Iredell County and borders Yadkin County to the north, Union Grove Township to the west, Turnersburg Township to the south, and Davie County to the east. The following named bodies of water flow through Eagle Mills Township: Dutchman Creek, Hunting Creek, Kennedy Creek, Little Dutchman Creek, Little Hunting Creek, Long Branch, and South Yadkin River. U.S. Route 21 runs north–south through the center of the township. Two major roads, Hunting Creek Road and Houstonville Road, run east–west.

== Demographics ==
The population of Eagle Mills Township contained 849 (78 percent) white males and females, and 243 (22 percent) black males and females in 1870, shortly after the civil war and county creation in 1868.

Historical population
Census	Pop.	Note	%±
1870	1,092		—
1880	1,151		5.4%
1890	1,193		3.6%
1900	1,220		2.3%
1910	1,220		0.0%
1920	1,224		0.3%
1930	1,350		10.3%
1940	1,364		1.0%
1950	1,004		−26.4%
1960	1,548		54.2%
1970	1,757		13.5%
1980	1,557		−11.4%
1990	1,621		4.1%
2000	1,856		14.5%
2010	1,912		3.0%
2020	1,758		−8.1%
1870-2010 2020

=== Towns, churches, and schools ===
The unincorporated town of Houstonville and the former town of Eagle Mills are included within the boundaries of Eagle Mills Township. The town of Harmony is partially within Eagle Mills Township.

Current and historical towns, churches, and schools within Eagle Mills Township include:

- Beulah Baptist Church, organized on August 1, 1895, originally in the Fulbright schoolhouse
- Eagle Mills Assembly of God
- Eagle City post office (1894–1907)
- Eagle Mills post office (1848–1894)
- Goshen Post Office, operated from 1829 to 1842, located near Long Branch
- Holly Springs Baptist Church, organized as an arm of Zion Baptist Church on March 6, 1847, located on the south side of County Road 1833, about one half miles west of Houstonville
- Houstonville Colored School
- Joyner School House
- Mt. Carmel Triumphant Pentecostal Protestant Church
- Mt. Nebo Baptist Church, black Baptist church established in 1870
- New Hope Church, Baptist church organized in 1902
- Pleasant Hill Baptist Church, black Baptist church established before the Civil War
- Rock(y) Spring School House, in operation as early as 1884, in Turkeyfoot section of township, one room schoolhouse, closed in 1931
- Rock Spring Baptist Church, organized on November 22, 1884, in Turkeyfoot section of township (then knowns as Settle community)
- Sandy Springs Baptist Church, organized in 1840, located near the Yadkin County line
- Steelman School House
- Wesley Chapel Methodist Church, organized on August 8, 1868, originally named Bush Hill Methodist Church
