= Gaither House (Harmony, North Carolina) =

Historic house in North Carolina, United States

- U.S. National Register of Historic Places
- Location within North Carolina Location within the United States
- Location: NC 901, near Harmony, North Carolina
- Coordinates: 35°56′37″N 80°44′39″W
- Area: 3.5 acres (1.4 ha)
- Built: c. 1850
- Architectural style: Greek Revival
- MPS: Iredell County MRA
- NRHP reference No.: 80002851
- Added to NRHP: November 24, 1980

Gaither House is a historic home located near Harmony, Iredell County, North Carolina. It was built about 1850, and is a two-story, three bay by three bay, vernacular Greek Revival style frame dwelling. It has a gable roof and features a hipped roof entrance portico with fluted Doric order columns.

It was added to the National Register of Historic Places in 1980.
