= Harmony, North Carolina =

- Town
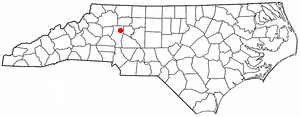
- Location of Harmony, North Carolina
- Coordinates: 35°57′33″N 80°46′25″W
- Country: United States
- State: North Carolina
- County: Iredell
- Incorporated: 1927

Area
  - Total: 1.36 sq mi (3.53 km^{2})
  - Land: 1.36 sq mi (3.51 km^{2})
  - Water: 0.0039 sq mi (0.01 km^{2})
- Elevation: 968 ft (295 m)

Population (2020)
  - Total: 543
  - Density: 400.3/sq mi (154.56/km^{2})
- Time zone: UTC-5 (Eastern (EST))
  - Summer (DST): UTC-4 (EDT)
- ZIP code: 28634
- Area code: 704
- FIPS code: 37-29640
- GNIS feature ID: 2406644
- Website: www.townofharmony.org

Harmony is a town in Iredell County, North Carolina, United States. The town was incorporated in 1927 and is located in northeastern Iredell County, which lies in the eastern portion of North Carolina High Country. It is primarily located in Turnersburg Township, with its northernmost portion in Eagle Mills Township. As of the 2020 census, Harmony had a population of 543.

The Gaither House, Holland-Summers House, and Morrison-Campbell House are listed on the National Register of Historic Places and are located in or near Harmony. Harmony is the home of the annual Wild Goose Festival, a faith based social justice gathering.

== History ==
Harmony was incorporated in 1927. It was named after the Harmony Hill Camp Meetings, which took place for two weeks each year on the current site of the Harmony elementary school. The focus of the meetings was a religious (Methodists and Baptists) revival with extensive social gatherings. The first meeting occurred in 1846 and meetings continue to be held the second weekend of October. While the area around Harmony is mostly rural, the town includes a library, the Tomlinson-Moore family park, Harmony Volunteer Fire Department, community center, elementary school, doctor's offices, a manufacturing plant (Associated Metal Works), and other businesses. The Harmony Academy was founded in 1908. It later became Harmony Farm Life (an accredited high school) in 1916. In the 1966 consolidation of high schools in Iredell County, the site of the Harmony high school became an elementary school.

== Geography ==
U.S. Route 21 passes through the town center, leading north 23 miles (37 km) to Elkin and south 15 miles (24 km) to Statesville, the Iredell County seat. North Carolina Highway 901 crosses US 21 in the center of Harmony, leading northwest 5 miles (8 km) to Interstate 77 and southeast 6 miles (10 km) to U.S. Route 64.

According to the United States Census Bureau, the town has a total area of 1.4 square miles (3.5 km^{2}), of which 2.5 acres (0.01 km^{2}), or 0.38%, are water.

== Demographics ==
Historical population
Census	Pop.	Note	%±
1930	337		—
1940	348		3.3%
1950	374		7.5%
1960	322		−13.9%
1970	377		17.1%
1980	470		24.7%
1990	431		−8.3%
2000	526		22.0%
2010	531		1.0%
2020	543		2.3%
U.S. Decennial Census

As of the census of 2010, there were 533 people, 206 households, and 150 families residing in the town. The population density was 380.7 inhabitants per square mile (147.0/km^{2}). There were 223 housing units at an average density of 161.3 per square mile (62.3/km^{2}). The racial makeup of the town was 91.44% White, 5.89% African American, 1.90% Native American, 0.38% from other races, and 0.38% from two or more races. Hispanic or Latino of any race were 2.47% of the population.

There were 206 households, out of which 32.0% had children under the age of 18 living with them, 55.8% were married couples living together, 13.1% had a female householder with no husband present, and 26.7% were non-families. 24.3% of all households were made up of individuals, and 10.2% had someone living alone who was 65 years of age or older. The average household size was 2.55 and the average family size was 3.03.

In the town, the population was spread out, with 25.1% under the age of 18, 8.9% from 18 to 24, 30.4% from 25 to 44, 23.4% from 45 to 64, and 12.2% who were 65 years of age or older. The median age was 36 years. For every 100 females, there were 94.1 males. For every 100 females age 18 and over, there were 89.4 males.

The median income for a household in the town was $30,972, and the median income for a family was $41,042. Males had a median income of $30,139 versus $22,708 for females. The per capita income for the town was $15,591. About 6.5% of families and 10.9% of the population were below the poverty line, including 10.8% of those under age 18 and 5.9% of those age 65 or over.

== Notable people ==
- Kenneth R. Harris, Mayor of Charlotte, North Carolina from 1977 to 1979
- Roger Sharpe, public servant and member of the North Carolina Senate from 1977 to 1978
