= National Register of Historic Places listings in Iredell County, North Carolina =

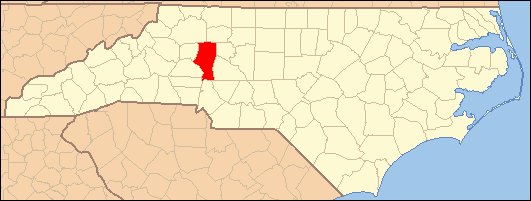

This list includes properties and districts listed on the National Register of Historic Places in Iredell County, North Carolina. Click the "Map of all coordinates" link to the right to view an online map of all properties and districts with latitude and longitude coordinates in the table below.

== Current listings ==
This National Park Service list is complete through NPS recent listings posted March 27, 2026.

	Name on the Register	Image	Date listed	Location	City or town	Description
1	Academy Hill Historic District	Academy Hill Historic District	November 24, 1980 (#80002867)	Western Ave., Bell, Mulberry, Wise and Armfield Sts. 35°46′38″N 80°53′24″W	Statesville	Built in 1885-1930.
2	Allison Woods	Allison Woods	March 9, 1995 (#95000173)	Roughly, area east and south of US 21 surrounding the South Yadkin River, north to NC 2156; 35°53′43″N 80°49′13″W	Statesville	Built in 1926-1938
3	Bethesda Presbyterian Church, Session House and Cemetery	Bethesda Presbyterian Church, Session House and Cemetery	December 8, 1980 (#80002855)	SR 2359; 35°43′15″N 80°48′19″W	Statesville	Built in 1853.
4	Espy Watts Brawley House	Espy Watts Brawley House	November 24, 1980 (#80002859)	601 William St. 35°35′57″N 80°48′29″W	Mooresville	Built in 1904.
5	Perciphull Campbell House	Perciphull Campbell House	December 8, 1980 (#80002881)	SR 1832; 36°02′31″N 80°50′32″W	Union Grove	Built c. 1820
6	Center Street A.M.E. Zion Church	Center Street A.M.E. Zion Church	November 24, 1980 (#80002868)	S. Center St. 35°46′44″N 80°53′07″W	Statesville	Built in 1903
7	Centre Presbyterian Church, Session House and Cemeteries	Centre Presbyterian Church, Session House and Cemeteries	November 24, 1980 (#80002863)	SR 1245; 35°33′07″N 80°51′17″W	Mount Mourne	Built in 1765 (originally). Destroyed by fire. Reconstructed in 1854.
8	Coddle Creek Associate Reformed Presbyterian Church, Session House and Cemetery	Coddle Creek Associate Reformed Presbyterian Church, Session House and Cemetery	November 24, 1980 (#80002864)	SR 1146; 35°30′37″N 80°46′03″W	Mount Mourne	Built in 1753. Destroyed by fire in 1838. Destroyed by fire and then reconstructed in 1884.
9	Cornelius House		November 24, 1980 (#80002860)	SR 1378 and SR 1302; 35°37′46″N 80°52′13″W	Mooresville	Built in 1825.
10	Daltonia	Daltonia	December 8, 1980 (#80002856)	SR 2115; 36°00′02″N 80°44′57″W	Houstonville	Built in 1858.
11	Damascus Baptist Church Arbor	Damascus Baptist Church Arbor	November 24, 1980 (#80002850)	Off SR 1158 and SR 1582; 35°56′04″N 80°58′43″W	Harmony	Built in 1855.
12	Davidson House		November 24, 1980 (#80002880)	SR 1337; 35°44′55″N 80°54′57″W	Troutman	Built in 1805, 1830.
13	East Broad Street-Davie Avenue Historic District	East Broad Street-Davie Avenue Historic District	November 24, 1980 (#80002869)	Davie Ave., Broad and Elm Sts. 35°47′17″N 80°52′58″W	Statesville	Built in 1880-1930.
14	Ebenezer Academy, Bethany Presbyterian Church and Cemetery	Ebenezer Academy, Bethany Presbyterian Church and Cemetery	December 8, 1980 (#80002857)	U.S. 21; 35°51′43″N 80°50′41″W	Houstonville	Built in 1823 (academy), 1855 (church)
15	Henry Eccles House		November 24, 1980 (#80002870)	SR 2145 and SR 2180; 35°51′08″N 80°43′39″W	Statesville	Built in 1861.
16	Falls-Hobbs House		June 24, 1982 (#82003471)	SR 1303; 35°37′11″N 80°53′21″W	Statesville	Built in 1820s or 1830s
17	Farmville Plantation		June 19, 1973 (#73001353)	Southeast of Elmwood off US 70 on SR 2362; 35°44′22″N 80°45′54″W	Elmwood	Built in 1818.
18	Feimster House		June 24, 1982 (#82003472)	SR 1516; 35°52′23″N 80°58′36″W	Statesville	Built c. 1800
19	Fort Dobbs	Fort Dobbs	September 15, 1970 (#70000458)	Fort Dobbs Rd. 35°49′17″N 80°52′58″W	Statesville	Built in 1755-1756
20	Gaither House		November 24, 1980 (#80002851)	NC 901; 35°56′37″N 80°44′39″W	Harmony	Built c. 1850
21	Garfield and Green Streets Historic District		December 29, 2025 (#100012437)	Roughly bounded bv Old Salisbury Road, a tributary of Fourth Creek. S. Center Street, and the Norfolk Southern Railroad; 35°46′48″N 80°52′50″W	Statesville	
22	Hargrave House	Hargrave House	June 24, 1982 (#82003473)	NC 152 and NC 150; 35°36′14″N 80°46′07″W	Statesville	Built c. 1860
23	Holland-Summers House		November 24, 1980 (#80002852)	Off SR 1904; 35°55′03″N 80°54′04″W	Harmony	Built in 1850.
24	George Houston House	George Houston House	November 24, 1980 (#80002865)	NC 115; 35°31′22″N 80°50′29″W	Mount Mourne	Built in 1818.
25	Iredell County Courthouse	Iredell County Courthouse	May 10, 1979 (#79003434)	200 S. Center St. 35°47′00″N 80°53′19″W	Statesville	Built in 1899.
26	Johnson-Neel House	Johnson-Neel House	June 20, 1975 (#75001275)	4 miles (6.4 km) west of Mooresville off NC 150; 35°35′46″N 80°53′11″W	Mooresville	Built in 1826-1835.
27	Key Memorial Chapel	Key Memorial Chapel	November 24, 1980 (#80002871)	150 E. Sharpe St. 35°46′55″N 80°53′04″W	Statesville	Built in 1898.
28	King-Flowers-Keaton House		November 24, 1980 (#80002872)	NC 115 and SR 1905; 35°53′37″N 80°57′02″W	Statesville	Built c. 1800
29	Henry Fletcher and Carrie Allison Long House	Henry Fletcher and Carrie Allison Long House	April 26, 2021 (#100006460)	335 North Center St. 35°47′20″N 80°53′27″W	Statesville	
30	Main Building, Mitchell College	Main Building, Mitchell College	January 25, 1973 (#73001354)	Broad St. 35°46′58″N 80°53′39″W	Statesville	Built in 1854-1856.
31	McClelland-Davis House		November 24, 1980 (#80002873)	SR 1551; 35°49′51″N 80°55′28″W	Statesville	Built c. 1830
32	McElwee Houses	McElwee Houses	November 24, 1980 (#80002874)	122, 126, 134 and 140 Water St. 35°47′11″N 80°53′15″W	Statesville	Built in 1900-1910
33	Mitchell College Historic District	Mitchell College Historic District	November 24, 1980 (#80002875)	NC 90 and U.S. 70; also roughly bounded by Mulberry, Race, Cherry, Oak, and Alexander Sts. 35°47′04″N 80°54′16″W	Statesville	Built in 1885-1930. Second set of boundaries represents a boundary increase of September 6, 2002
34	Mooresville Historic District	Mooresville Historic District	November 24, 1980 (#80002861)	NC 115 and NC 152; also includes properties fronting West Center Ave. from North Academy St. to Sherrill St.; Charlotte St.; 300 blk. of West McLelland Ave.; and properties fronting South Academy St. from West McLelland Ave. to Wilson St. 35°35′03″N 80°48′48″W	Mooresville	Second set of addresses represent a boundary increase approved April 23, 2020.
35	Mooresville Mill Village Historic District	Mooresville Mill Village Historic District	April 24, 2012 (#12000238)	Bounded by Wilson, Cauldwell, Kennette, Lutz, Messeck, and Catawba Aves., Smith and Bruce Sts., and Shearers Rd. 35°34′26″N 80°49′26″W	Mooresville	Built in 1902-1930.
36	Mooresville Water Pump and Filter Plant		April 18, 2023 (#100008853)	422 West Moore Ave. 35°35′18″N 80°48′52″W	Mooresville	
37	Morrison-Campbell House		November 24, 1980 (#80002853)	Off SR 2125; 35°58′00″N 80°44′04″W	Harmony	Built c. 1860
38	Morrison-Mott House	Morrison-Mott House	November 24, 1980 (#80002876)	332 N. Center St. 35°47′21″N 80°53′25″W	Statesville	Built in 1904-1905.
39	Mount Mourne	Mount Mourne	October 29, 1974 (#74001354)	Off NC 115; 35°32′19″N 80°50′58″W	Mount Mourne	Built in 1836.
40	Norwood School	Norwood School	December 9, 2021 (#100007249)	349 Troutman Farm Rd. 35°42′51″N 80°56′04″W	Statesville vicinity	
41	Ramsey Farm		December 9, 2021 (#100007250)	1853 Norwood Rd. 35°47′56″N 80°51′47″W	Statesville	
42	Reid Memorial Presbyterian Church		April 23, 2020 (#100005198)	336 North Broad St. 35°35′11″N 80°48′33″W	Mooresville	
43	Col. Silas Alexander Sharpe House	Col. Silas Alexander Sharpe House	November 24, 1980 (#80002877)	402 S. Center St. 35°46′53″N 80°53′14″W	Statesville	Built in 1860-1865.
44	Snow Creek Methodist Church and Burying Ground	Snow Creek Methodist Church and Burying Ground	November 24, 1980 (#80002854)	Off SR 1904; 35°54′37″N 80°55′12″W	Harmony	Built in 1884-1885. Church established in 1801. Graveyard from 1780.
45	South Broad Street Row	South Broad Street Row	November 24, 1980 (#80002862)	251-311 S. Broad St. 35°34′50″N 80°49′01″W	Mooresville	Built in 1890-1895.
46	South Race Street Historic District	South Race Street Historic District	May 26, 1995 (#95000635)	Roughly bounded by S. Race St., Western Ave., W. Armfield St., W. Bell St., W. Sharpe St., and S. Oak St. 35°46′40″N 80°53′37″W	Statesville	Built in 1898-1909.
47	Statesville Commercial Historic District	Statesville Commercial Historic District	November 24, 1980 (#80002878)	Roughly bounded by Front, Meeting, Broad, and Tradd Sts. 35°47′04″N 80°54′18″W	Statesville	Built in 1875-1925.
48	Henry Turner House and Caldwell-Turner Mill Site		November 24, 1980 (#80002879)	SR 2145; 35°51′45″N 80°43′37″W	Statesville	Built c. 1860
49	United States Post Office and Court House-Statesville	United States Post Office and Court House-Statesville	April 26, 2018 (#100002363)	200 W. Broad St. 35°47′03″N 80°53′25″W	Statesville	
50	U.S. Post Office and County Courthouse	U.S. Post Office and County Courthouse	January 24, 1974 (#74001355)	227 S. Center St. 35°46′59″N 80°53′15″W	Statesville	Built in 1891.
51	Waddle-Click Farm		June 24, 1982 (#82003474)	SR 2309; 35°46′46″N 80°44′31″W	Statesville	Built in 1820-1835.
52	Watkins Chapel AME Zion Church		April 13, 2022 (#100007596)	505 Cascade St. 35°35′41″N 80°48′26″W	Mooresville	
53	Welch-Nicholson House and Mill Site		December 8, 1980 (#80002858)	Statesville vicinity 36°02′56″N 80°46′11″W	Houstonville	Built in 1795.
54	Wood Lawn		November 24, 1980 (#80002866)	SR 1138; 35°31′05″N 80°50′05″W	Mount Mourne	Built in 1836 by Dr. George Washington Stinson.

Note: The datafiles for Iredell County in the NRHP have been moved to National Archives Catalog. They can now be accessed at "Table with links to the National Archives". National Archives. and searching on "Iredell" or the NRHP number, e.g. Table search for 80002854 (Snow Creek Methodist Church and Burying Ground).

== See also ==
- National Register of Historic Places listings in North Carolina
- List of National Historic Landmarks in North Carolina
