= Mott House =

Mott House may refer to:

- Mott House (Columbus, Georgia)
- Granville-Mott House, Highland Park, IL
- Lloyd Hamilton Mott House, Red Bush, KY, listed on the National Register of Historic Places (NRHP)
- Peter Mott House, Lawnside, NJ, listed on the NRHP
- Morrison-Mott House, Statesville, NC
- Mott House, Topeka, KS
