= Hobbs House =

Hobbs House may refer to:

- Thomas Hobbs Jr. House, North Berwick, Maine
- Hobbs Brook Basin Gate House, Waltham, Massachusetts, NRHP-listed
- Isaac Hobbs House, Weston, Massachusetts, NRHP-listed
- Marcus Hobbs House, Worcester, Massachusetts, NRHP-listed
- Clarke–Hobbs–Davidson House, Hendersonville, North Carolina, NRHP-listed in Henderson County
- Falls–Hobbs House, Statesville, North Carolina, NRHP-listed in Iredell County
