= Hargrave House =

Hargrave House may refer to:

- Hargrave House (Hazlehurst, Mississippi), listed on the National Register of Historic Places in Copiah County, Mississippi
- Hargrave House (Statesville, North Carolina), listed on the National Register of Historic Places in Iredell County, North Carolina
