= Cold Spring Township =

Cold Spring Township may refer to the following places in the United States:

- Cold Spring Township, Shelby County, Illinois
- Cold Spring Township, Pennsylvania

See also

- Coldsprings Township, Michigan
- Coolspring Township (disambiguation)
