= T.M. Stikeleather =

American politician

Theodore Martin "T.M." Stikeleather (1848–1934) was elected to the North Carolina House of Representatives in 1894 and to the State Senate in 1900 from the Populist Party. In the Senate he represented the 27th district, which included Iredell, Davie and Yadkin counties.

== Family ==
Theodore Martin Stikeleather was the son of John Alexander Stikeleather and Rhoda Lee Gunn. He is listed in Volume 3 of Levi Branson's North Carolina Agricultural Almanac as a farmer in Turnersburg in 1890. T. M. was born on August 28, 1848, and died in Statesville, North Carolina, on June 25, 1934, as the result of complications from facial cancer. He is buried in Oakwood Cemetery, Statesville, North Carolina. He had 8 children with Amelia Louise "Amie" Stimpson, plus two other wives.

== Populist Party ==
During the 1890s, North Carolina witnessed a political revolution as the newly formed Populist Party joined with the Republicans to unseat conservative Democrats. Focusing on political transformation, electoral reform, and new economic policies to aid poor and struggling farmers, the Populists and their coalition partners took power at all levels in the only southern state where Populists gained statewide office. For a brief four years, the Populists and Republicans gave an object lesson in progressive politics in which whites and African Americans worked together for the betterment of the state and the lives of the people.
