= Henry Fletcher and Carrie Allison Long House =

Historic house in North Carolina, United States

- U.S. National Register of Historic Places
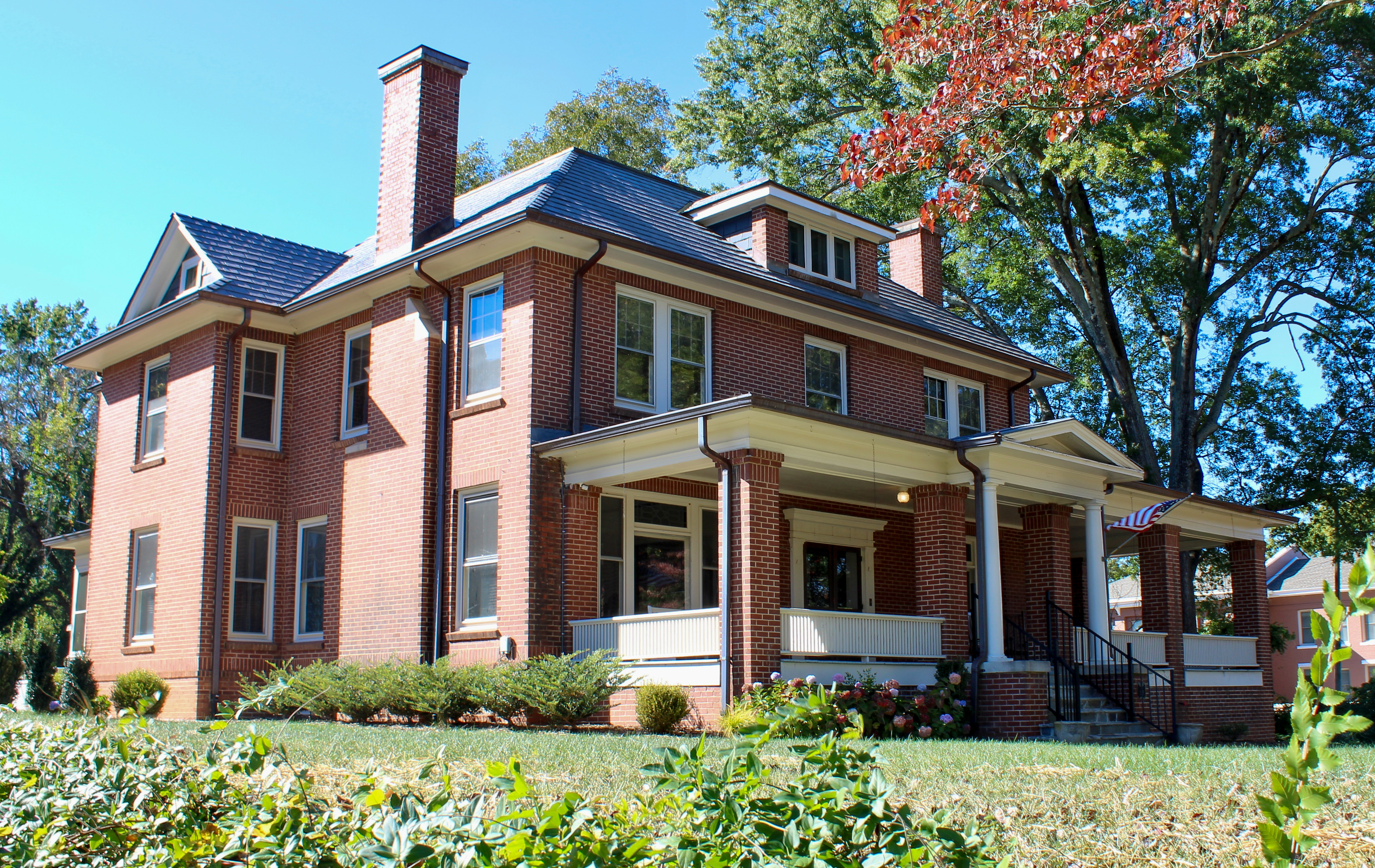

- Location within North Carolina Location within the United States
- Location: 335 North Center Street, Statesville, North Carolina
- Coordinates: 35.788857°N 80.89091°W
- Area: One acre
- Built: 1915
- Architectural style: Craftsman, Tudor revival, and Colonial Revival
- MPS: Iredell County MRA
- NRHP reference No.: 100006460
- Added to NRHP: April 26, 2021

The Henry Fletcher and Carrie Allison Long House, known locally as "Dr. Long's House," was listed in the National Register of Historic Places on April 26, 2021. The home is known as the dwelling of Dr. Henry F. Long, a notable doctor in Statesville, North Carolina, reportedly known for contributions to the expansion of healthcare in the area as well as being one of the first surgeons in the state of North Carolina to perform appendectomies. The home was designed by architect Louis H. Asbury who incorporated elements of the craftsman, Tudor revival, and colonial revival styles. The house was erected in 1915 and sits on a 1.08 parcel of land that once was a part of a 2.75 acre stretch of land that had been purchased by Long in 1899. Before the construction of the historic home in 1915, Long and his wife, Carrie, resided in a Queen Anne cottage on the same site that was destroyed in a fire in March 1915. The retaining wall constructed in 1915 remains at the site today along with 1900s smokehouse, the carriage house constructed in 1915 that is paved with brick reported to be taken from the original 1900 dwelling’s foundation, and what is reported to be the laundry facility constructed between 1918 and 1925 and used for the sanatorium that Long opened in 1905 to the northeast of the structure. There is a garage, shed, and red brick wall on the property as well that were constructed after 1950. In 1904, Long commissioned another Queen Anne cottage that was nearly identical to the home that he and his wife commissioned in 1900, which served as a temporary sanatorium. This structure no longer exists, but the larger, three-story brick building that Long commissioned north of the original sanatorium in 1912 became H. F. Long Hospital and operated until 1954. This structure still stands and serves as offices for government agencies. The house is currently privately owned and a local law firm operates out the building. There are many historical sites in the surrounding area.
