= Cool Springs Township, Iredell County, North Carolina =

Cool Springs Township
- Township
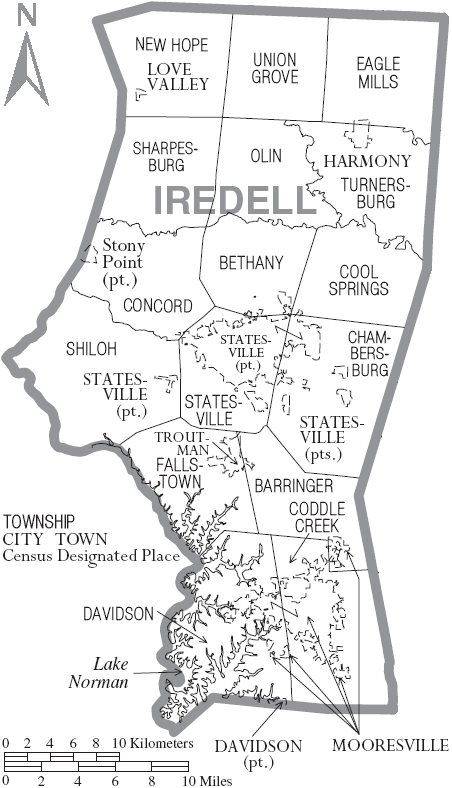
- Cool Springs Township in Iredell County

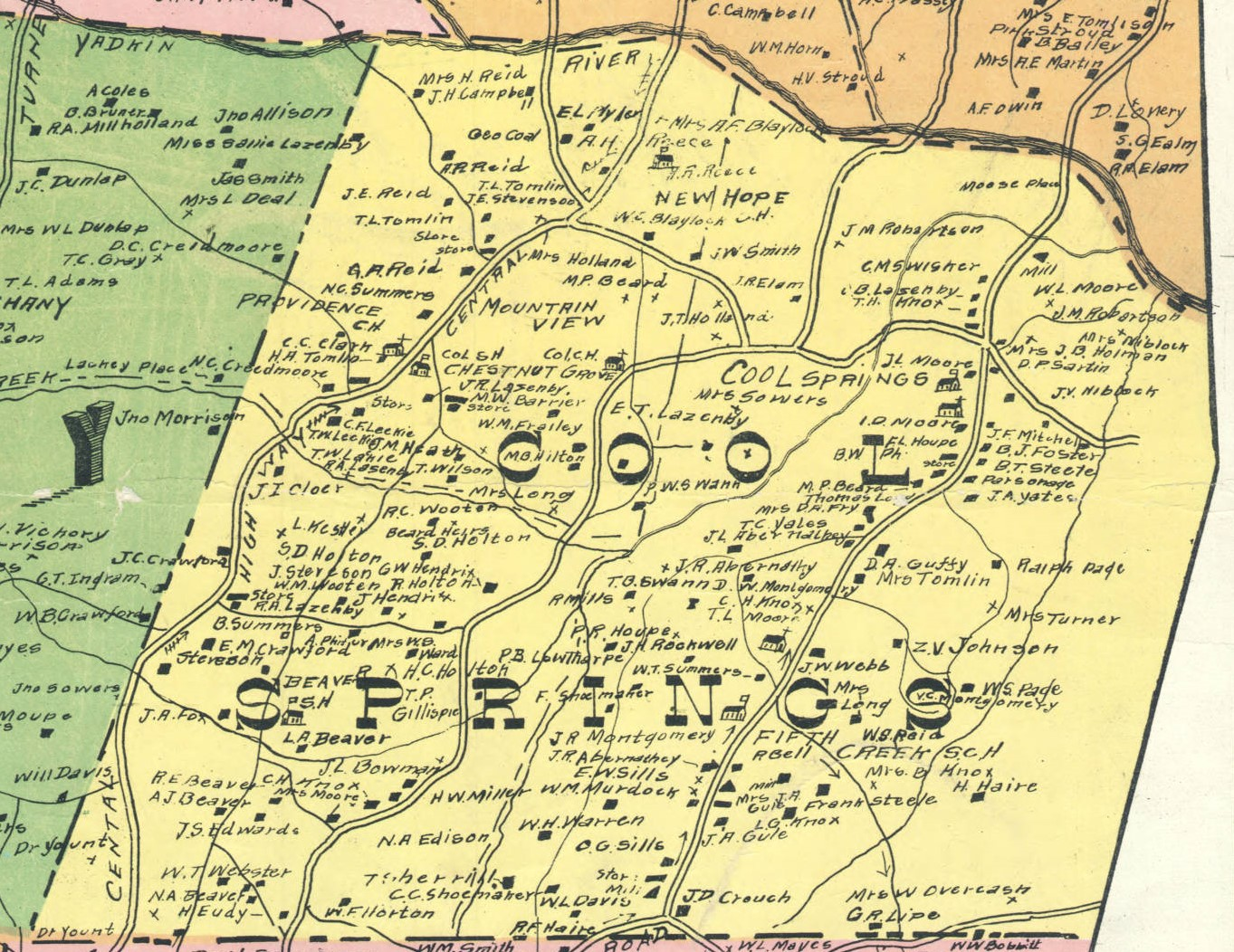
- Cool Springs Township in 1917
- Country: United States
- State: North Carolina
- County: Iredell
- Established: 1868

Government
  - Type: non-functioning administrative division

Area
  - Total: 30.44 sq mi (78.8 km^{2})
  - Land: 30.23 sq mi (78.3 km^{2})
  - Water: 0.20 sq mi (0.52 km^{2})

Population (2010)
  - Total: 3,912
  - Density: 129.4/sq mi (50.0/km^{2})

Cool Springs Township is a non-functioning administrative division of Iredell County, North Carolina, United States. By the requirements of the North Carolina Constitution of 1868, the counties were divided into townships, which included Cool Springs township as one of sixteen townships in Iredell County.

== History ==
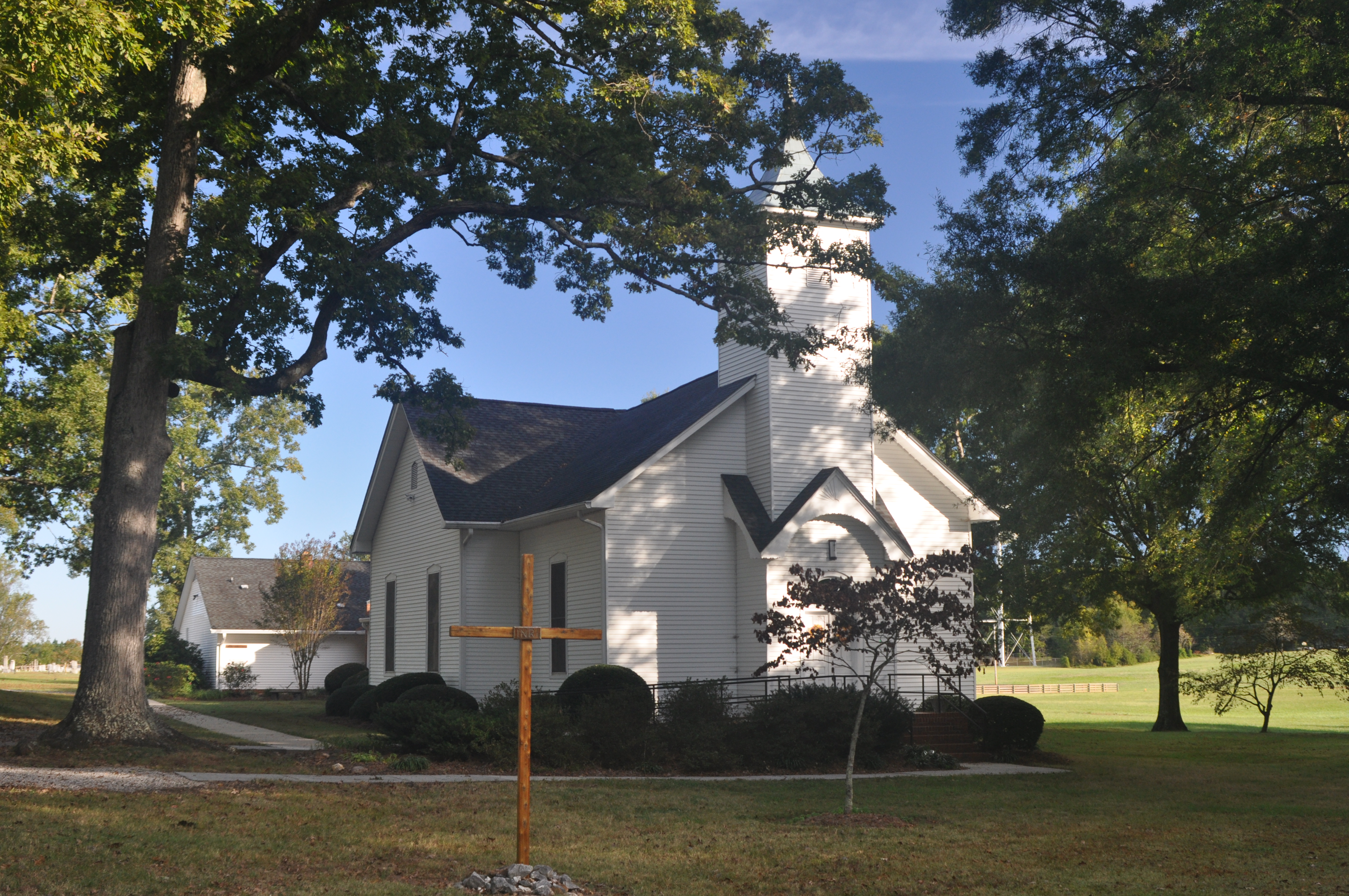
Fifth Creek Presbyterian Church, founded in 1846 (2017)

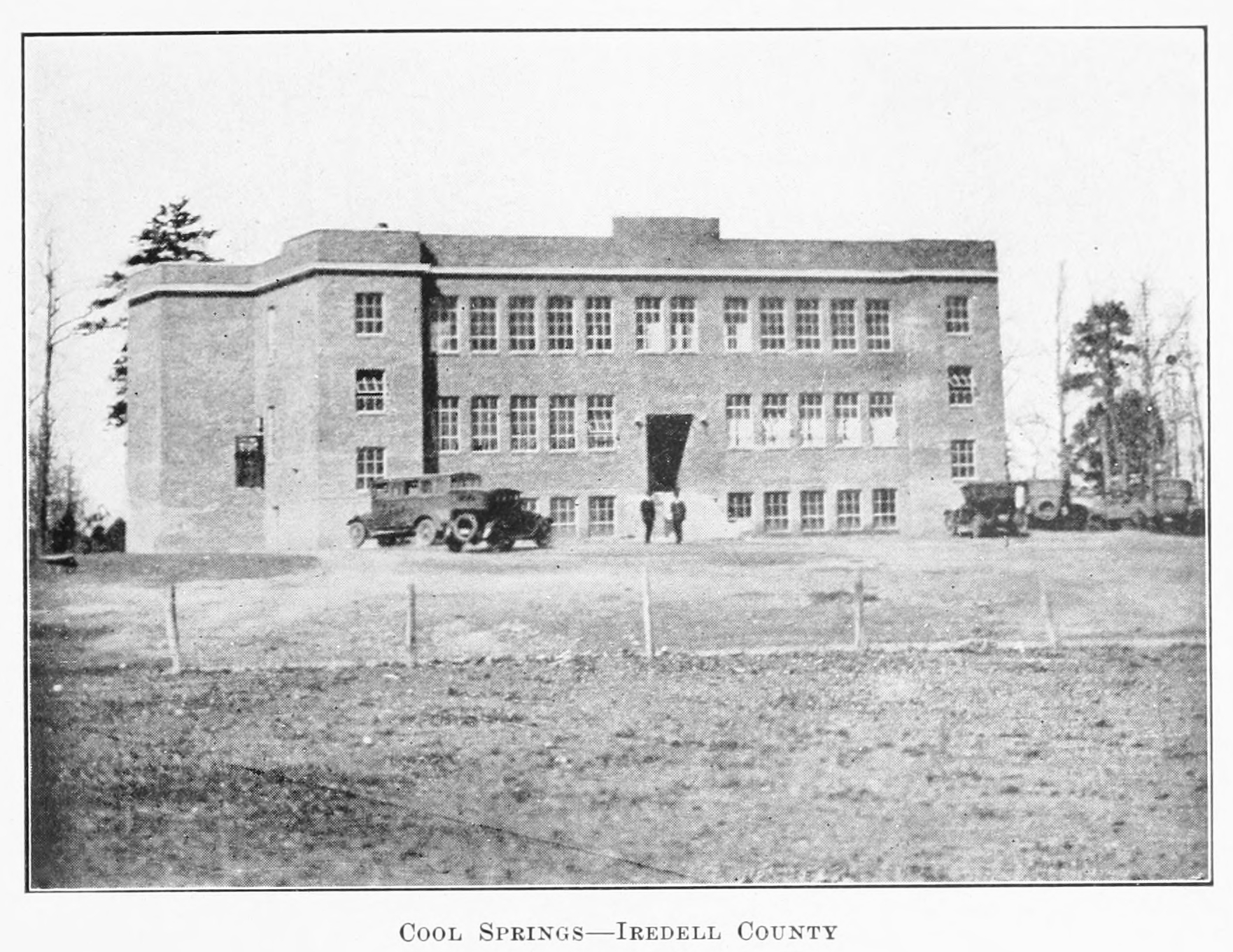
Cool Spring School

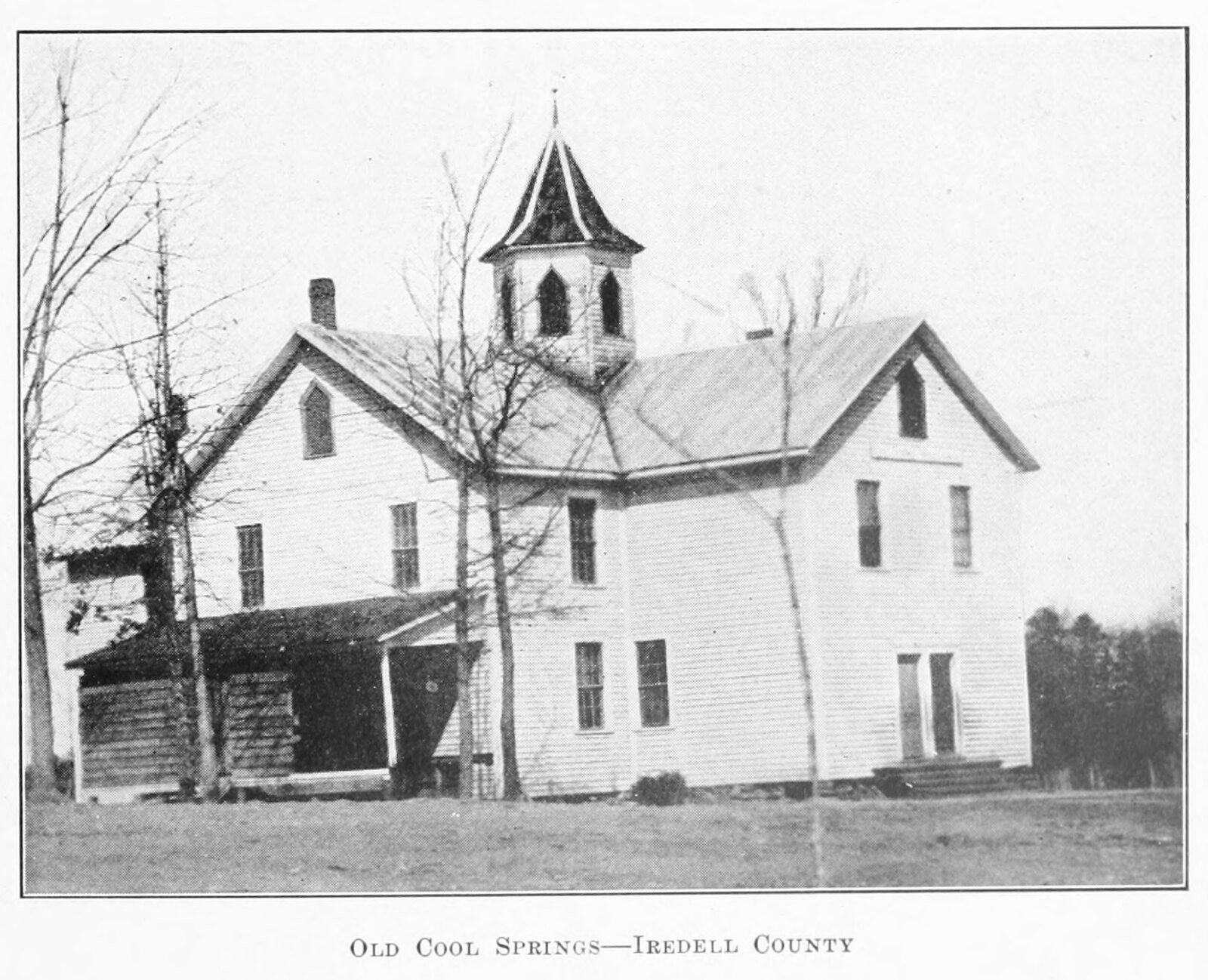
Old Cool Spring Academy about 1900

There were very few residents in the area of this township from US Revolutionary times until before the Civil War. A road was established from Statesville to Mocksville that passed through the township in 1829. This road followed what is now U.S. Highway 64. The oldest home in the township that was still standing in 2022 was the Dr. John Richard Barr Adams (1820-1901) home, built in 1817. Dr. Adams was elected to the North Carolina House of Commons in 1852 and 1854 from Iredell County. The area was named for cool springs, which originated in the area, including one active spring that still feeds 5th creek. There was a post office in Cool Springs as early as 1852. The first postmaster was Marshall Turner. The post office was used until June 1865 when it closed. There were mills on the 5th Creek as early as 1868. There was a Cool Springs academy in the early 1900s. Fred Houpe operated a general store in Cools Spring in the early 1900s.

The communities of Oak Forest was located in Cool Springs Township from 1837 to 1907 with John B. Belt as the first postmaster.

== Sites of interest ==
The following sites of interest are located in Cool Springs Township:

- Chestnut Grove Baptist Church, founded in early 1900s, 35°51′47″N 80°45′59″W
- Chestnut Grove School, historical (African American)
- Cool Spring Academy, operated as early as 1817
- Cool Springs Baptist Church, 1913-1941
- Cool Spring Elementary School35°50′47″N 80°43′59″W
- Cool Spring School (originally from 1898, new building 1922–1966), combined grades one through twelve, Cool Spring High School (1949-1966)
- Cool Spring United Methodist Church, founded in 190935°50′38″N 80°44′01″W
- Cool Springs Volunteer Fire Department, organized in 196035°50′20″N 80°45′03″W
- Countryside Baptist Church, 35°51′24″N 80°45′59″W
- East Iredell Middle School,35°50′13″N 80°47′24″W
- Faith Church35°48′39″N 80°45′17″W
- Fifth Creek School (historical)
- Fifth Creek Presbyterian Church, founded in 1846, 35°49′44″N 80°45′04″W
- Henry Eccles House (formerly known as the old "Montgomery House", built in 1850 and on the National Register of Historic Places, 35°51′08″N 80°43′39″W
- John B. Knox home, built in 1826 but destroyed by fire in the 1980s, 35°51′11″N 80°43′45″W
- Lewis Cemetery (tombstones of early colonial settlers along Fifth Creek)35°50′41″N 80°43′58″W
- Mountain View Methodist Church
- New Hope Baptist Church, organized in 1802, second oldest in Iredell County35°52′55″N 80°45′57″W
- Oak Forest Post Office (historical), 35°48′46″N 80°45′51″W
- Providence Methodist Church, founded in 1814
- Shady Nook School (African American)
- Summers School (African American)

== Geography ==
The Yadkin River forms the northern boundary of the township. The eastern boundary is formed by the Rowan County line. The town of Statesville is partially within the Cool Springs township. Bodies of water within the township include Beaver Creek and Fifth Creek.

Cool Springs Township is an election precinct in Iredell County. Major roads in the township include:

- Cool Springs Road
- I-40
- Mocksville Highway

== See also ==
- Coolspring Township, LaPorte County, Indiana
- Coolspring Township, Mercer County, Pennsylvania
- Cool Spring Township, Rutherford County, North Carolina

== Bibliography ==
- The Genealogical Society of Iredell County, ed. (July 1980). The Heritage of Iredell County. Vol. II. Statesville, North Carolina. p. 642. ISBN 0-89459-087-1.
- The Genealogical Society of Iredell County, ed. (July 2000). The Heritage of Iredell County, NC. Vol. II. Statesville, North Carolina. p. 574., Library of Congress | 00-110956
- Keever, Homer M. (November 1976). Iredell Piedmont County, with illustrations by Louise Gilbert and maps by Mildred Jenkins Miller. Iredell County Bicentennial Commission by Brady Printing Company from type set by the Statesville Record and Landmark.
