= Henry Eccles House =

Historic house in North Carolina, United States

- U.S. National Register of Historic Places
- Location within North Carolina Location within the United States
- Location: SR 2145 and SR 2180, Statesville, North Carolina
- Coordinates: 35°51′08″N 80°43′39″W
- Area: 17 acres (6.9 ha)
- Built: c. 1861
- Architectural style: Greek Revival
- MPS: Iredell County MRA
- NRHP reference No.: 80002870
- Added to NRHP: November 24, 1980

Henry Eccles House is a historic home located at Cool Springs Township, Iredell County, North Carolina. The house was built about 1861, and is a two-story, three bay by two bay, frame Greek Revival style dwelling. It has a low hipped roof, one-story rear addition, and two interior brick chimneys. Also on the property is a contributing log barn.

It was added to the National Register of Historic Places in 1980. The house was formerly known as the "Old Montgomery House".
