= Feimster House =

Historic house of Iredell County, North Carolina, built near 1800 but since demolished

- U.S. National Register of Historic Places
- Location within North Carolina Location within the United States
- Location: SR 1516, near Statesville, North Carolina
- Coordinates: 35°52′23″N 80°58′36″W
- Area: 116 acres (47 ha)
- Built: c. 1800
- Architectural style: Georgian, Federal
- MPS: Iredell County MRA
- NRHP reference No.: 82003472
- Added to NRHP: June 24, 1982

Feimster House was a historic home located near Statesville, Iredell County, North Carolina. It was built about 1800, and is a 1 1/2-story, three bay by two bay, frame transitional Georgian / Federal style dwelling. It had a steeply pitched gable roof and rested on a high fieldstone foundation. It has been demolished.

It was added to the National Register of Historic Places in 1982.
