= Houstonville, North Carolina =

- Unincorporated community
- Location within North Carolina Location within the United States
- Coordinates: 36°00′11″N 80°45′58″W
- Country: United States
- State: North Carolina
- County: Iredell
- Elevation: 912 ft (278 m)
- Time zone: UTC-5 (Eastern (EST))
  - Summer (DST): UTC-4 (EDT)
- Area codes: 704 & 980
- GNIS feature ID: 1006247

Houstonville is an unincorporated community in the Eagle Mills Township of Iredell County, North Carolina, United States. Houstonville is located on U.S. Route 21, 3.3 miles (5.3 km) north of Harmony. Houstonville was founded in 1789 by Christopher Houston and is the second oldest town in Iredell County after the county seat, Statesville.

== History ==
Captain Christopher Houston (1744–1837), an American Revolutionary War veteran, was instrumental in establishing Iredell County in 1788 and the county seat of Statesville in 1789. He recognized the need for a town in the northern end of the county on Hunting Creek, so he founded Houstonville in 1789. (Houston moved to Tennessee in 1815.)

Other early settlers in Houstonville include:

- Captain Thomas Cadet Young (1732–1829), American Revolutionary War veteran, settled in the area in about 1778
- Captain Placebo Houston (1779–1859), born and died in Houstonville, son of Christopher Houston who married daughter of Thomas Cadet Young
- Solomon Hayes (1750–1830)
- Nathaniel Bacon Journey (1765-1842), American Revolutionary War veteran, buried in the Young Family Cemetery
- Col Francis Young (1779–1854), veteran of the War of 1812, buried in the Young Family Cemetery just north of Houstonville

Christopher Houston and most of the original settlers in this area ran small plantations and owned slaves. Christopher Houston owned six and Thomas Young owned 13 slaves in 1790.

The first post office was established in Houstonville on October 1, 1804, with Christopher Houston as postmaster. This post office was the second post office in Iredell County (after the Statesville Post Office) and served continually until February 9, 1869. A post office was re-established on March 5, 1883, with Mary C. Dalton as post master. This post office continued until November 30, 1955.

The following historic sites are located in or near Houstonville and listed on the National Register of Historic Places.

- Bethesda Presbyterian Church, Session House and Cemetery, established in 1853
- Daltonia, located near Houstonville and built by John H. Dalton in 1858
- Welch-Nicholson House and Mill Site, located near Houstonville and built in 1795

Other notable sites in or near Houstonville include:

- New Hope Baptist Church and Cemetery
- Young Family Cemetery, which includes American Revolutionary War graves, dating from 1797
- Hayes Family Cemetery, near Houstonville school, Road # 1830
- Zion Hill African Methodist Episcopal Zion Church and Cemetery
