= Coolspring Township =

Coolspring Township or Cool Spring Township may refer to:

- Coolspring Township, LaPorte County, Indiana
- Coolspring Township, Mercer County, Pennsylvania
- Cool Spring Township, Rutherford County, North Carolina, in Rutherford County, North Carolina

== See also ==
- Cool Springs Township, Iredell County, North Carolina
