= Falls–Hobbs House =

Historic house in North Carolina, United States

- U.S. National Register of Historic Places
- Location within North Carolina Location within the United States
- Location: SR 1303, near Statesville, North Carolina
- Coordinates: 35°37′11″N 80°53′21″W
- Area: 2.2 acres (0.89 ha)
- Architectural style: Greek Revival, Georgian, Federal
- MPS: Iredell County MRA
- NRHP reference No.: 82003471
- Added to NRHP: June 24, 1982

Falls–Hobbs House is a historic home located near Statesville, Iredell County, North Carolina. The house is dated to the 1820s or 1830s, and is a 2 1/2-story, three bay by two bay, frame dwelling. It has a steeply pitched gable roof, external end chimneys, and rests on a fieldstone foundation. The interior has Georgian, Federal, and Greek Revival style design elements. Also on the property is a contributing well house with a pyramidal roof.

It was added to the National Register of Historic Places in 1982.
