= Daltonia =

Historic home located near Houstonville, North Carolina

- U.S. National Register of Historic Places
- Location within North Carolina Location within the United States
- Location: SR 2115, near Houstonville, North Carolina
- Coordinates: 36°00′02″N 80°44′57″W
- Area: 57 acres (23 ha)
- Built: 1858
- Architectural style: Greek Revival
- MPS: Iredell County MRA
- NRHP reference No.: 80002856
- Added to NRHP: December 8, 1980

Daltonia, also known as the John H. Dalton House, was a historic home located near Houstonville, Iredell County, North Carolina. It was built in 1858, and is a two-story, three-bay by two-bay, Greek Revival style frame dwelling. It has a gable roof, two-story rear ell, and the front facade features a two-story pedimented portico. Also on the property is a contributing 1 1/2-story small log house and a loom house.

It was added to the National Register of Historic Places in 1980.

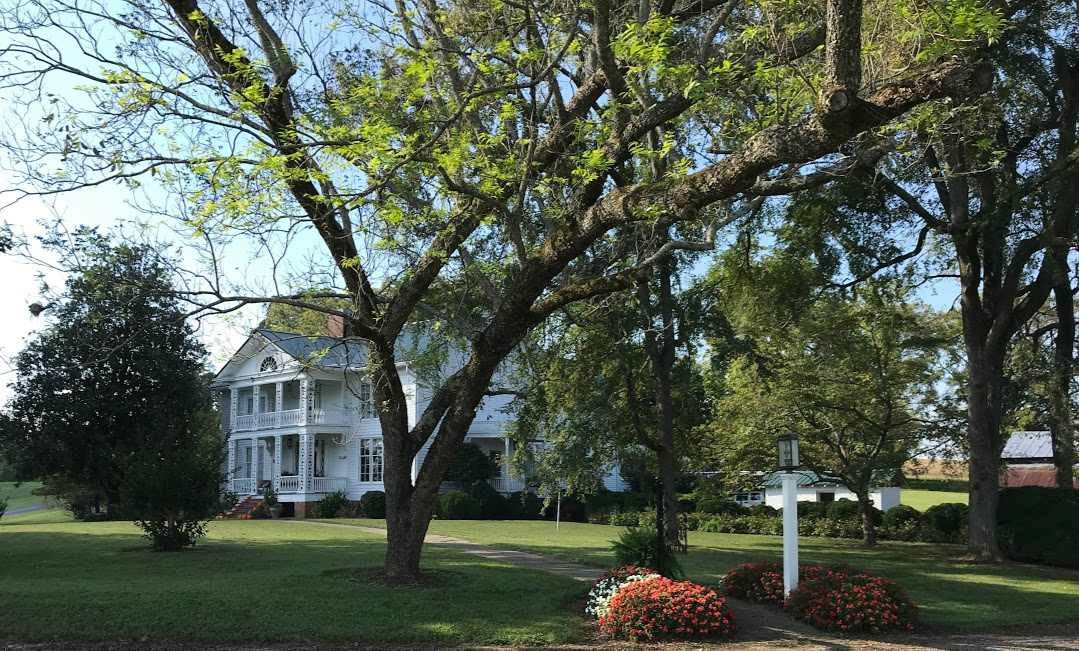
Daltonia Plantation
