= Thomas Hobbs Jr. House =

Historic house in Maine, United States

- U.S. National Register of Historic Places
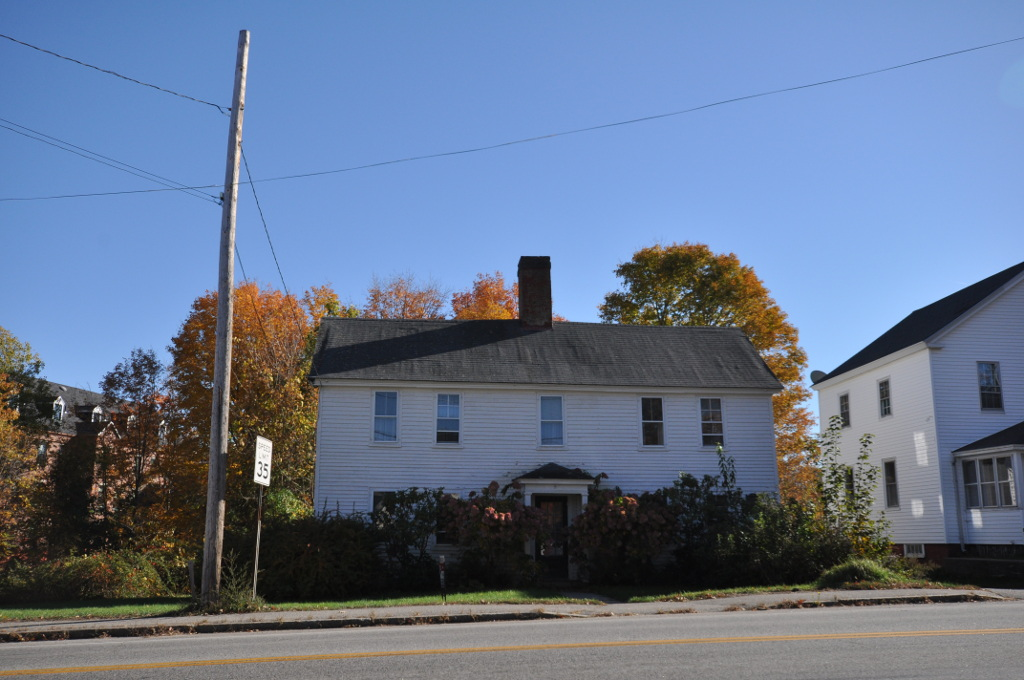

- Location within Maine Location within the United States
- Location: Wells St., North Berwick, Maine
- Coordinates: 43°18′19″N 70°44′17″W
- Area: 0.5 acres (0.20 ha)
- Built: 1763
- Architect: Morrill, Peter & William
- NRHP reference No.: 82000794
- Added to NRHP: February 11, 1982

The Thomas Hobbs Jr. House is a historic house at 8 Wells Street in North Berwick, Maine. Built in 1763, it is one of the town's oldest surviving houses, and was for many years a tavern and social center of the community. it was listed on the National Register of Historic Places in 1982.

== Description and history ==
The Hobbs House is located on the south side of Wells Street (Maine State Route 9), just east of its junction with Elm Street (Maine State Route 4) and west of the Great Works River in North Berwick's village center. The property is adjacent to the Great Works River. It is a 2 1/2-story wood-frame structure, five bays wide, with a side-gable roof, central chimney, clapboard siding, and a fieldstone foundation. The main entrance is sheltered by a small hip-roofed portico that is a later addition. The building has no significant styling: its upper windows butting against the eave in a typical Georgian fashion, and it has simple narrow corner boards and window trim. A single-story ell extends to the rear of the main block.

The house was built in 1763 for Thomas Hobbs Jr., a veteran of the French and Indian War. It became known locally as The Hostelry, because Hobbs provided food and lodging to travelers. Hobbs and his descendants were also active in local civic affairs, serving in the state legislature, and in the 1819 constitutional convention convened to draft Maine's constitution in advance of statehood. The house is now a private residence.

== See also ==
- National Register of Historic Places listings in York County, Maine
