= Col. Silas Alexander Sharpe House =

Historic house in North Carolina, United States

- U.S. National Register of Historic Places
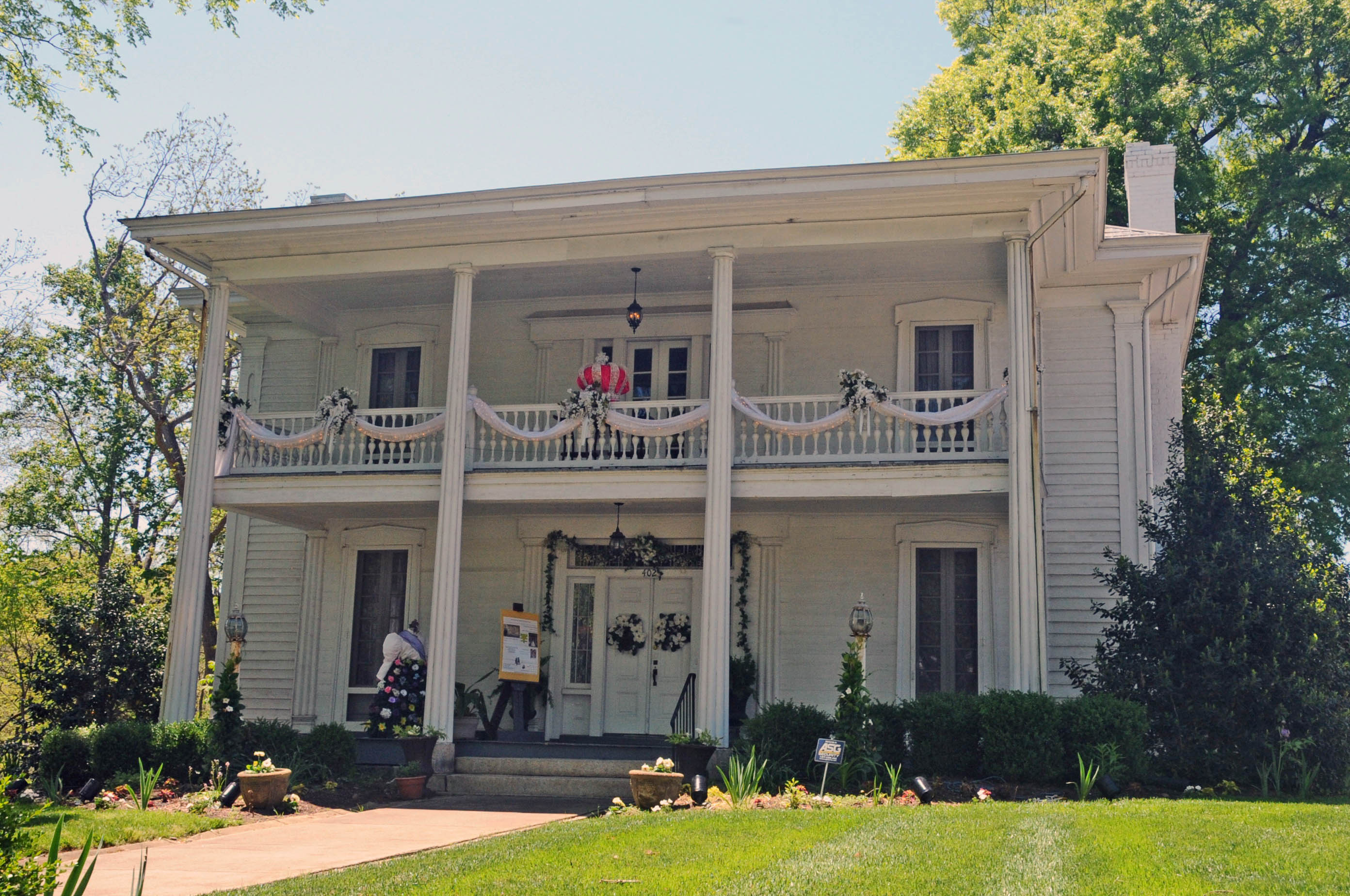

- Location within North Carolina Location within the United States
- Location: 402 S. Center St., Statesville, North Carolina
- Coordinates: 35°46′53″N 80°53′14″W
- Area: less than one acre
- Built: 1860-1865
- Architectural style: Mid 19th Century Revival, Classical Revival
- MPS: Iredell County MRA
- NRHP reference No.: 80002877
- Added to NRHP: November 24, 1980

Col. Silas Alexander Sharpe House is a historic home located at Statesville, Iredell County, North Carolina. The house was built between about 1860 and 1865, and is a two-story, three-bay, Classical Revival style frame dwelling. It features an elegant two-story, front portico with clustered columns.

It was added to the National Register of Historic Places in 1980.
