= Academy Hill Historic District (Statesville, North Carolina) =

Historic district in North Carolina, United States

- U.S. National Register of Historic Places
- U.S. Historic district
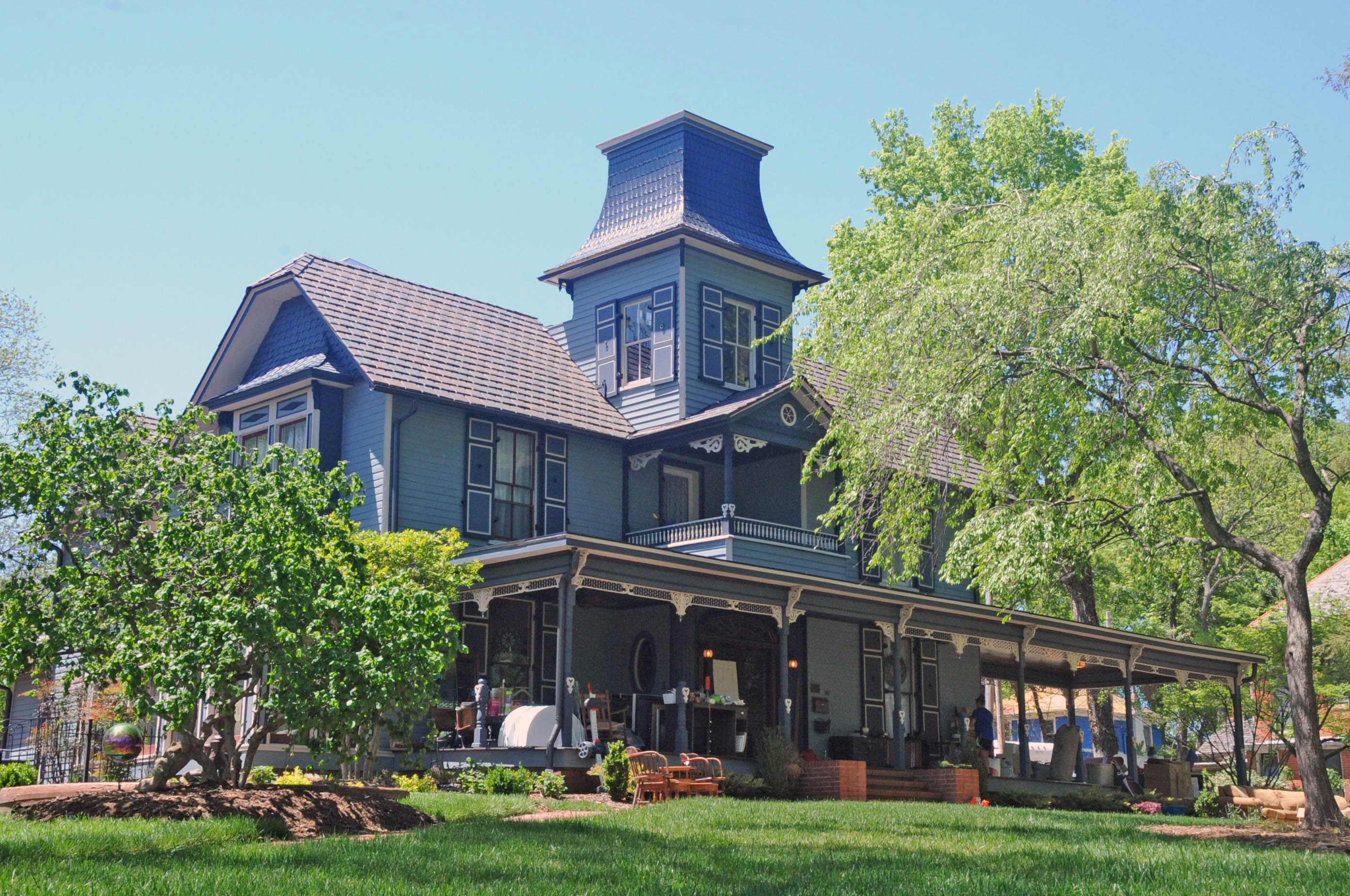
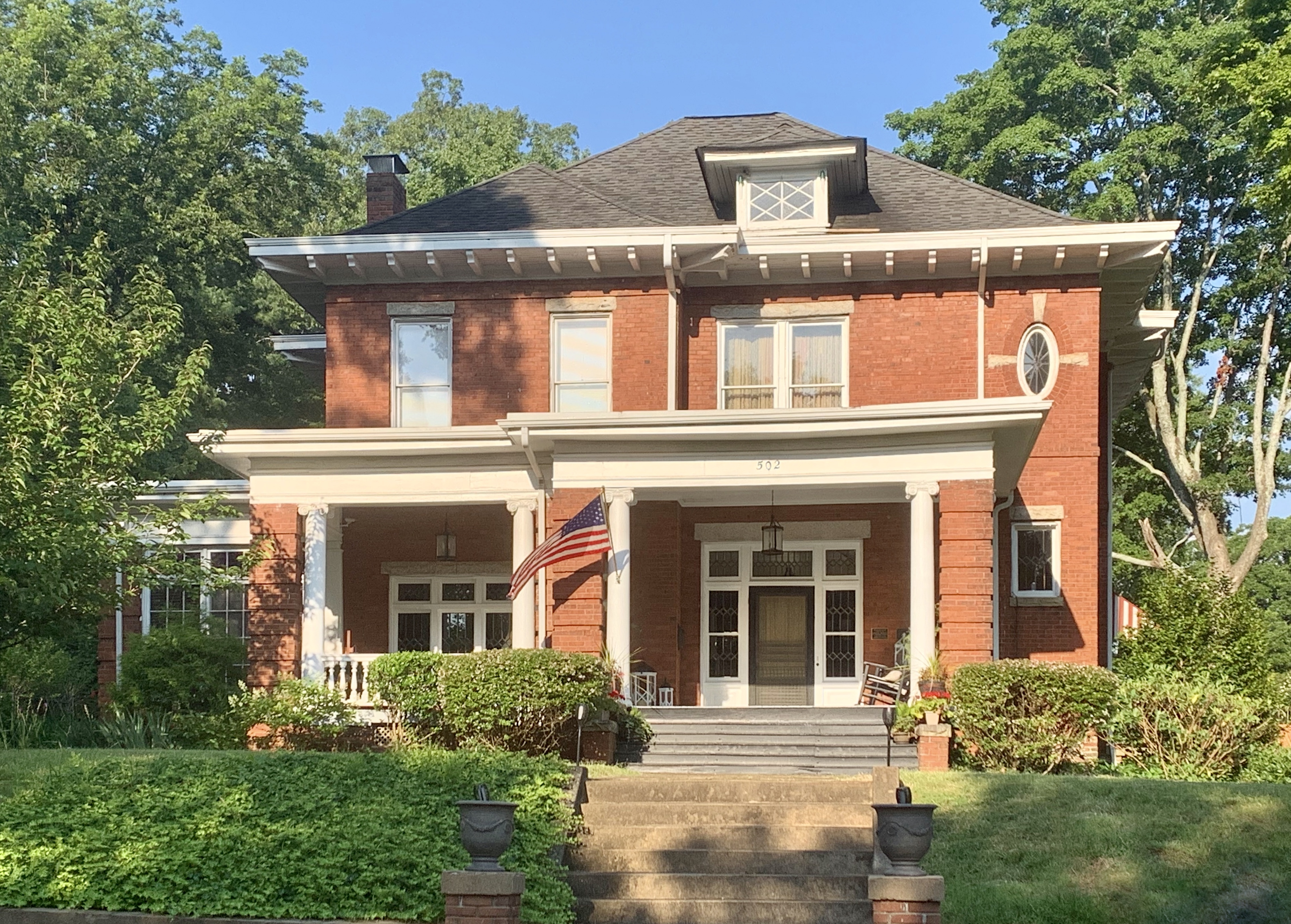
- J. C. Steele House H. O. Steele Home - Academy Hill Historic District - Statesville NC

- Location within North Carolina Location within the United States
- Location: Western Ave., Bell, Mulberry, Wise and Armfield Sts., Statesville, North Carolina
- Coordinates: 35°46′38″N 80°53′24″W
- Area: 35 acres (14 ha)
- Architect: Multiple
- Architectural style: Late Victorian
- MPS: Iredell County MRA
- NRHP reference No.: 80002867
- Added to NRHP: November 24, 1980

Academy Hill Historic District is a national historic district located at Statesville, Iredell County, North Carolina. It encompasses 40 contributing buildings in a mixed-use neighborhood of Statesville. The district includes notable examples of Late Victorian architecture including primarily brick educational and industrial buildings and one and two-story frame dwellings. They were mainly built between 1885 and 1930. Notable buildings include the former Statesville Male Academy (1874), Statesville Graded School (1892), J. C. Steele & Sons Brick Machinery Plant (c. 1905), Ash Tobacco Factory (c. 1895), O. W. Slane Glass Company (c. 1906), J. C. Steele House (1880s), C. M. Steele House (1901), H. Oscar Steele House (c. 1907), and William E. Webb House (c. 1917).

It was listed on the National Register of Historic Places in 1980.
