= South Race Street Historic District =

Historic district in North Carolina, United States

- U.S. National Register of Historic Places
- U.S. Historic district
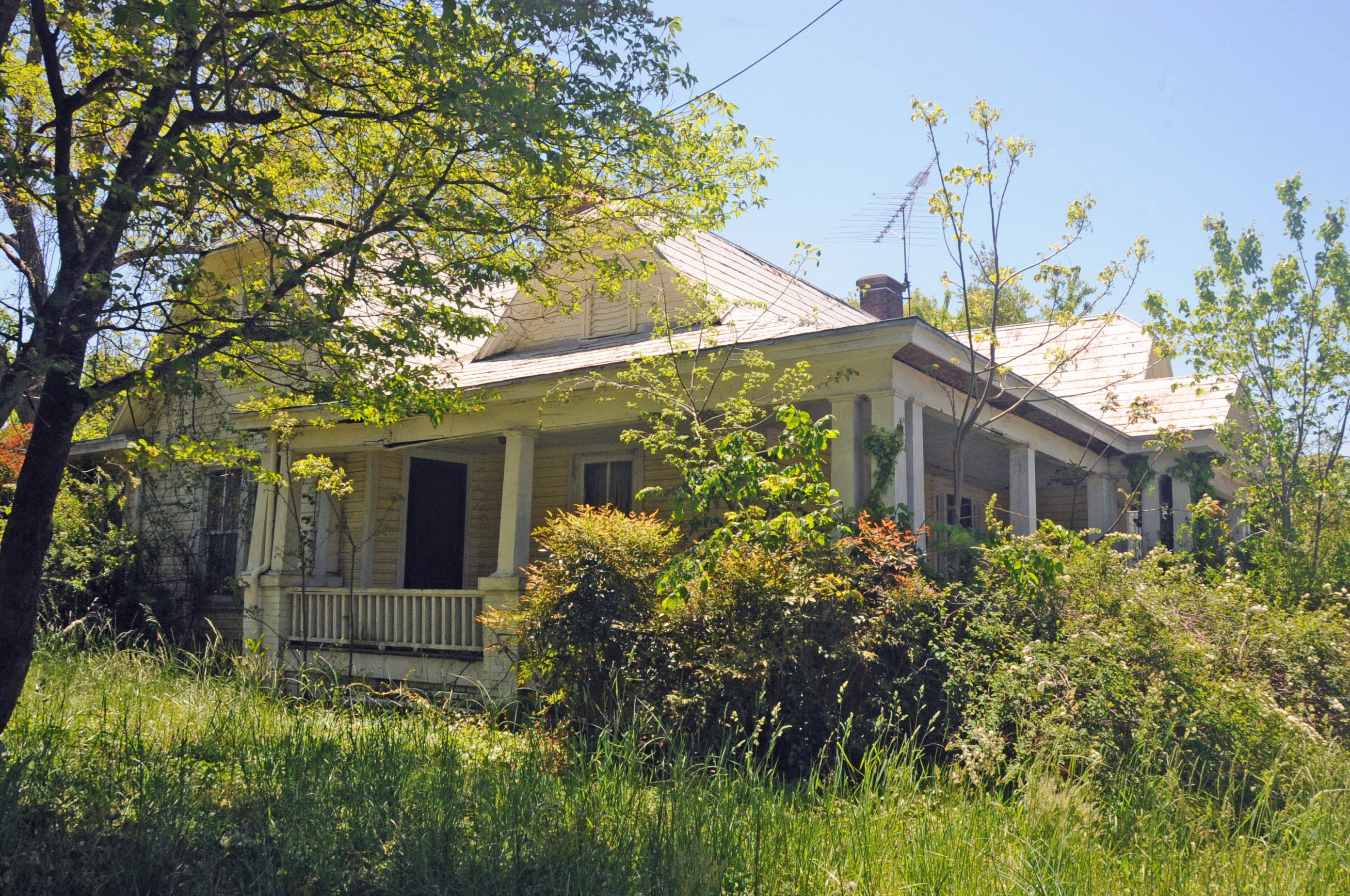
- J.F. Scroggs House

- Location within North Carolina Location within the United States
- Location: Roughly bounded by S. Race St., Western Ave., W. Armfield St., W. Bell St., W. Sharpe St. and S. Oak St., Statesville, North Carolina
- Coordinates: 35°47′04″N 80°54′18″W
- Area: 27 acres (11 ha)
- Architectural style: Queen Anne, Colonial Revival, Bungalow/craftsman
- NRHP reference No.: 95000635
- Added to NRHP: May 26, 1995

South Race Street Historic District is a national historic district located at Statesville, Iredell County, North Carolina. It encompasses 85 contributing buildings in a planned mixed residential and commercial section of Statesville. The district includes notable examples of Queen Anne, Colonial Revival and Bungalow / American Craftsman architecture dated between about 1894 and 1945. Notable buildings include the Western Avenue Baptist Church, Race Street Methodist Church parsonage, J.L. Kimball House (c. 1898), J.F. Scroggs House (c. 1909), J.W. Kaneer House (c. 1900), and J.G. Hallyburton House (c. 1900).

It was listed on the National Register of Historic Places in 1995.
