= Granville-Mott House =

Historic house in Illinois, United States

- U.S. National Register of Historic Places
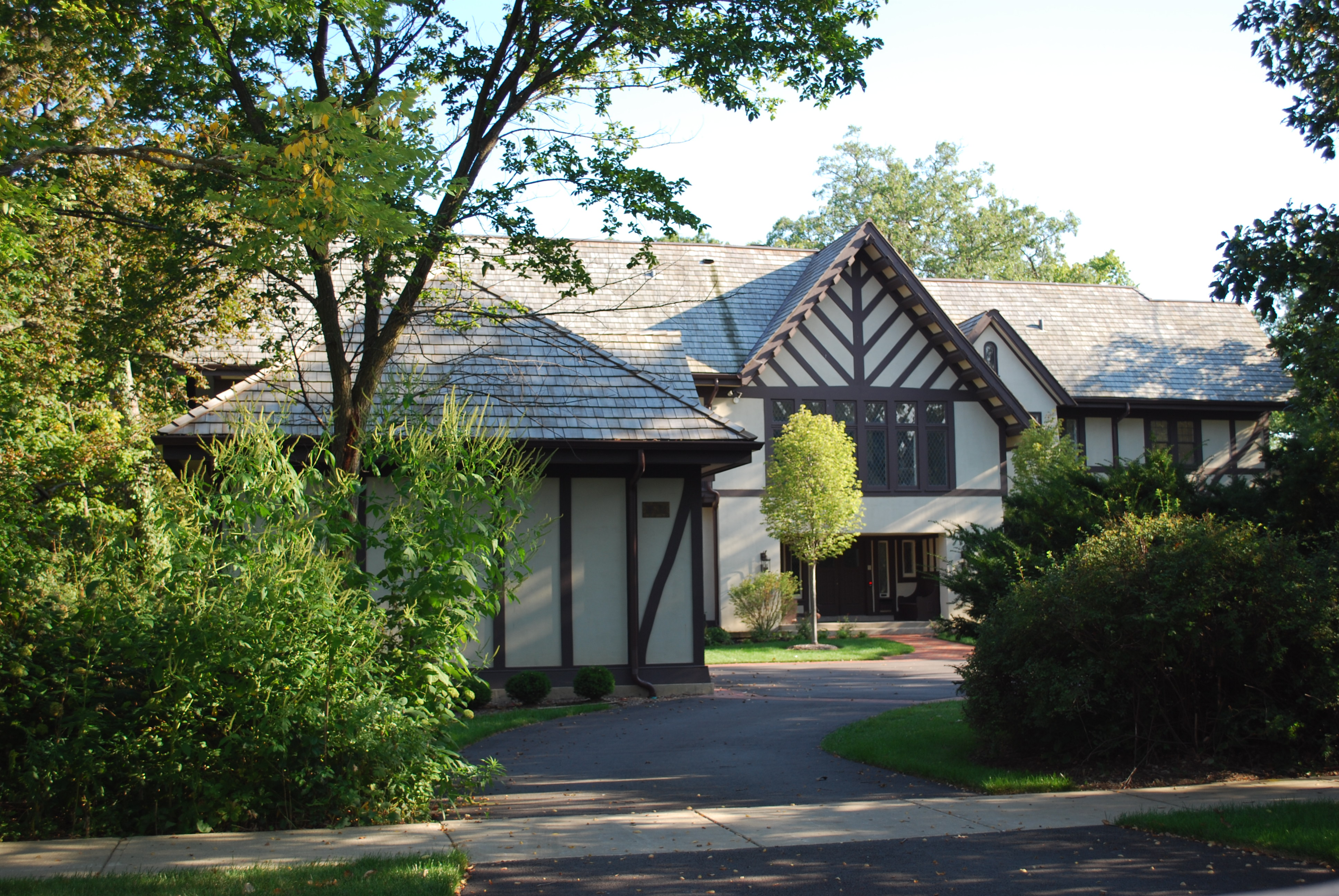

- Location within Chicago metropolitan area Location within Illinois Location within the United States
- Location: 80 Laurel Ave., Highland Park, Illinois
- Coordinates: 42°11′17″N 87°47′16″W
- Area: 1 acre (0.40 ha)
- Built: c. 1910
- Architect: Tallmadge & Watson
- Architectural style: Tudor Revival, Prairie School
- MPS: Highland Park MRA
- NRHP reference No.: 82002562
- Added to NRHP: September 29, 1982

The Granville-Mott House is a historic house at 80 Laurel Avenue in Highland Park, Illinois, United States. Built c. 1910, the house was designed by prominent Chicago architectural firm Tallmadge & Watson. The firm designed two houses and a church's chancel in Highland Park; the Granville-Mott House is the largest of these works. The house has a Tudor Revival design with Prairie School details. Its gable roof and extensive half-timbering are typical Tudor elements, while its casement windows and overhanging eaves are inspired by the Prairie School.

The house was added to the National Register of Historic Places on September 29, 1982.
