= Statesville Commercial Historic District =

Historic district in North Carolina, United States

- U.S. National Register of Historic Places
- U.S. Historic district
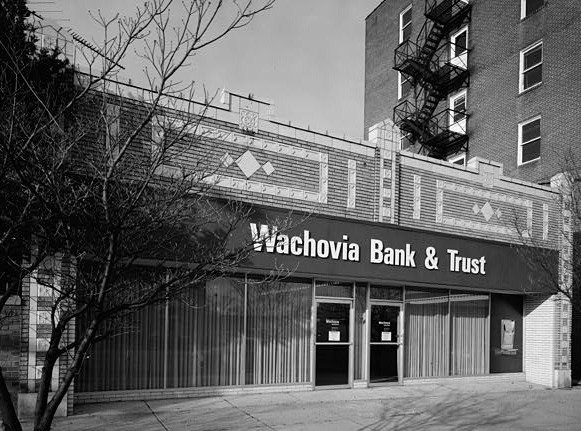
- Statesville Commercial Historic District, Madison Building, HABS Photo, November 1982

- Location within North Carolina Location within the United States
- Location: Roughly bounded by Front, Meeting, Broad and Tradd Sts., Statesville, North Carolina
- Coordinates: 35°47′04″N 80°54′18″W
- Area: 30 acres (12 ha)
- Architect: Multiple
- Architectural style: Late 19th And 20th Century Revivals, Late Victorian
- MPS: Iredell County MRA
- NRHP reference No.: 80002878
- Added to NRHP: November 24, 1980

Statesville Commercial Historic District is a national historic district located at Statesville, Iredell County, North Carolina. It encompasses 54 contributing buildings in the central business district of Statesville. The district includes notable examples of Late Victorian architecture dated between about 1875 and 1925. Located in the district are the separately listed U.S. Post Office and County Courthouse and Iredell County Courthouse. Other notable buildings include the First A. R. Presbyterian Church, former County Jail, the U. S. Post Office, former Walton and Gage Store (c. 1885), Miller Block (c. 1885), Madison Building, former Merchants and Farmers Bank (1908), former Carolina Motor Company (1916), former Montgomery Ward Store, and former First National Bank.

It was listed on the National Register of Historic Places in 1980.

== Gallery ==
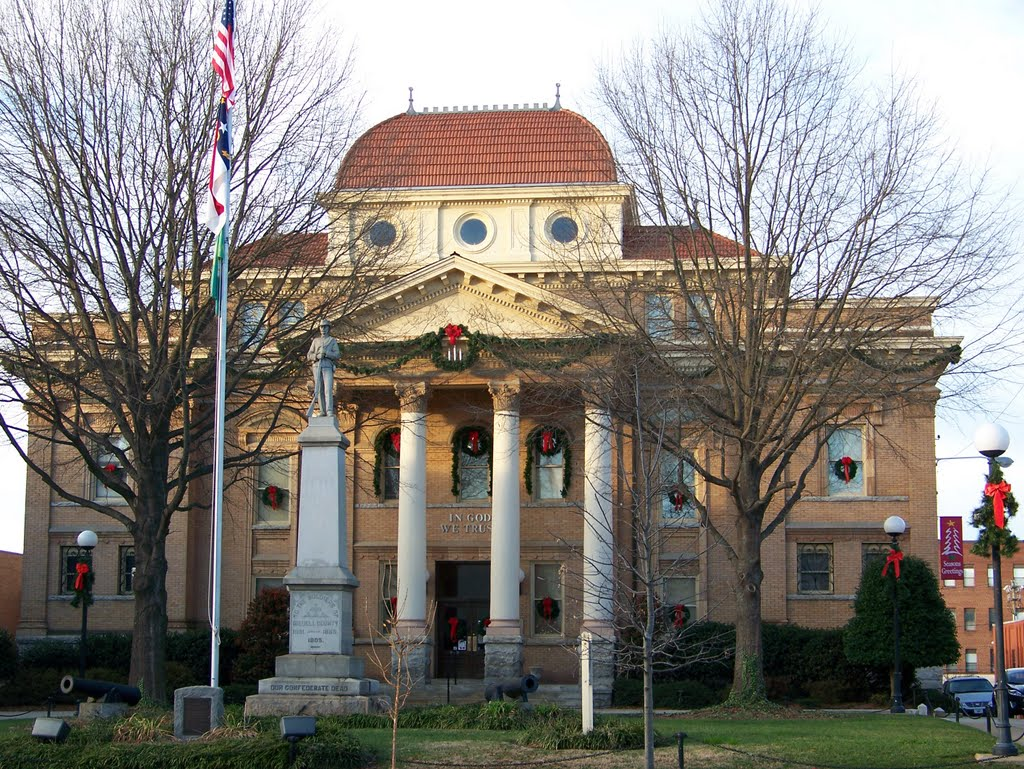
Iredell County Courthouse, 2011

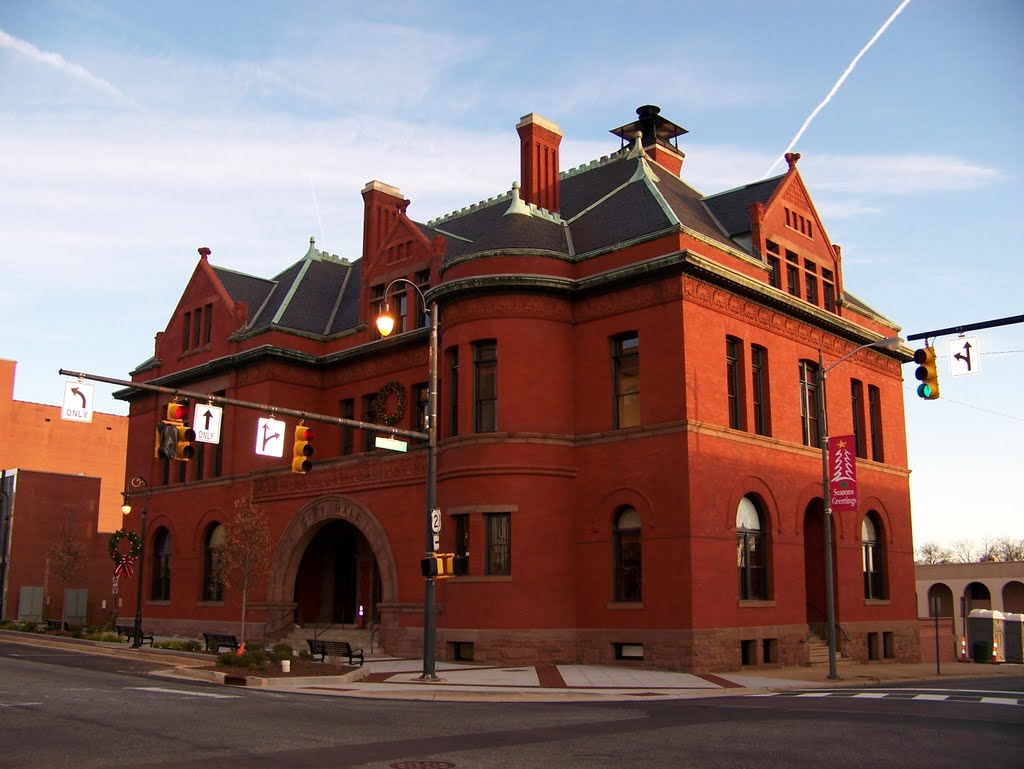
U.S. Post Office and County Courthouse, 2011
