= Center Street A.M.E. Zion Church =

Historic church in North Carolina, United States

- U.S. National Register of Historic Places
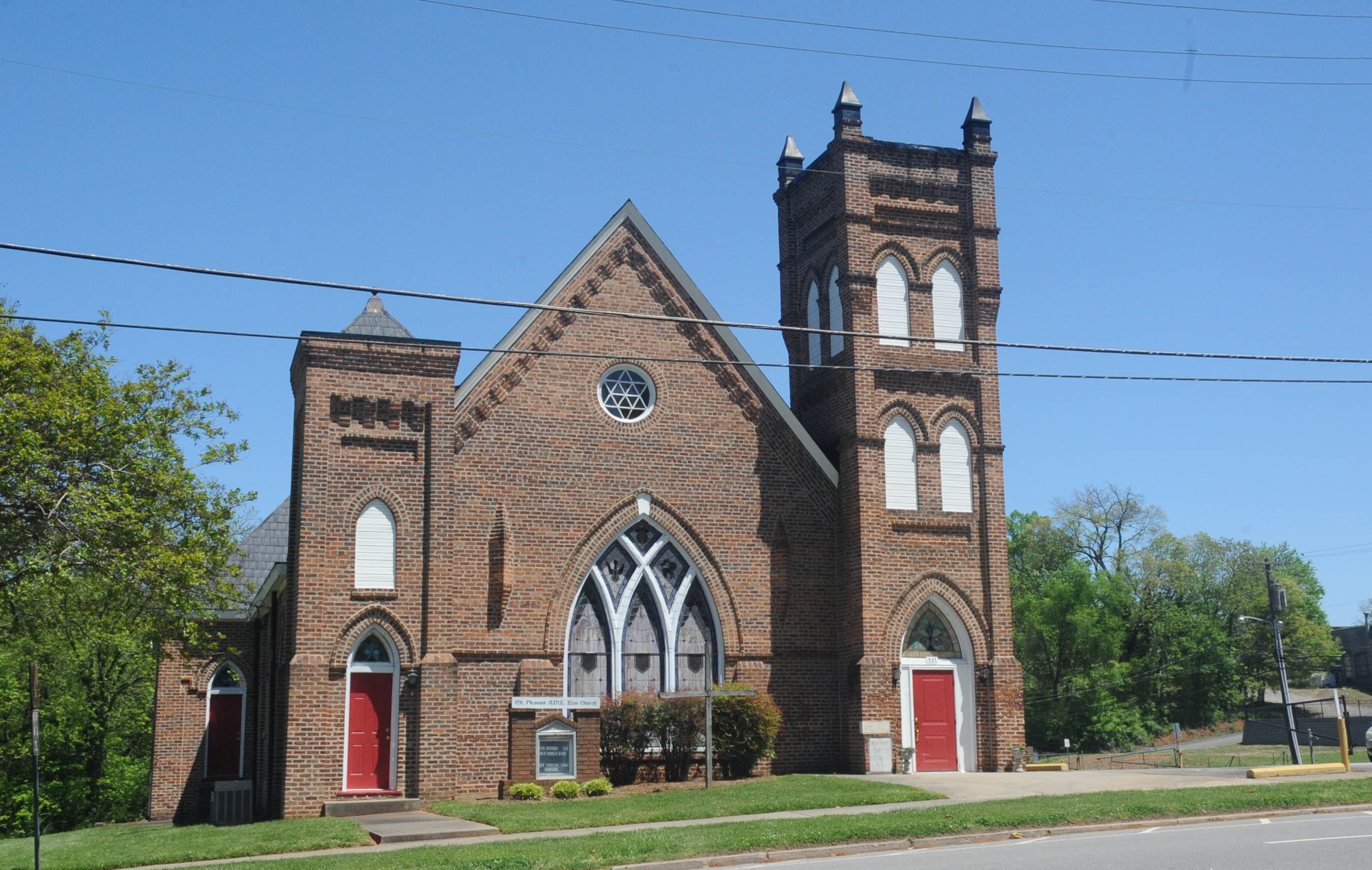

- Location within North Carolina Location within the United States
- Location: 537 S. Center St., Statesville, North Carolina
- Coordinates: 35°46′44″N 80°53′7″W
- Area: less than one acre
- Built: 1903
- Architectural style: Late Gothic Revival
- MPS: Iredell County MRA
- NRHP reference No.: 80002868
- Added to NRHP: November 24, 1980

Center Street A.M.E. Zion Church is a historic African Methodist Episcopal Zion church located on S. Center Street in Statesville, Iredell County, North Carolina. It was built in 1903, and is a one-story, three bay by seven bay, Late Gothic Revival-style brick building. It has a steep gable roof sheathed in pressed tin and features two corner entrance towers of unequal height and a large, pointed arch stained glass window. The church also goes by the name Mount Pleasant AME Zion Church.

It was added to the National Register of Historic Places in 1980.

== History ==
The Center Street Church is the oldest church associated with a black congregation in Statesville. The building is the third associated with the Mount Zion A.M.E. Church, which was formed in 1868 or 1869 after the U.S. Civil War. The first two buildings were wood frame structures. The first church leaders were Sidney S. Murdock and Alfred Baily.

== Other AME churches in Iredell County ==
Other AME Zion churches in Iredell County include:

- Shiloh AME Zion Church on Salisbury Road in the Belmont area of Statesville, organized in 1880
- Piney Grove AME Zion Church in Harmony
- Rocky Creek AME Zion Church in Harmony
- Mt. Vernon AME Zion Church in Statesville
- Siloam AME Zion Church in Harmony
- Elmwood AME Zion Church in Elmwood, organized in 1908
