= Henry Turner House and Caldwell–Turner Mill Site =

Historic farm in North Carolina, United States

- U.S. National Register of Historic Places
- U.S. Historic district
- Location within North Carolina Location within the United States
- Location: SR 2145, Statesville, North Carolina
- Coordinates: 35°51′45″N 80°43′37″W
- Area: 13 acres (5.3 ha)
- Built: c. 1860
- Architectural style: Greek Revival
- MPS: Iredell County MRA
- NRHP reference No.: 80002879
- Added to NRHP: c. November 24, 1980

Henry Turner House and Caldwell–Turner Mill Site is a historic home, grist mill site, and national historic district located at Statesville, Iredell County, North Carolina. The house was built about 1860, and is a two-story, three bay by two bay, frame dwelling with Greek Revival style design elements. It has a gable roof, exterior end chimneys, rear ell extension, two 12-foot-deep hand-dug cisterns, and a two-story, pedimented front entrance porch. Also on the property is the site of a grist mill, race, and dam and a family cemetery.

It was listed on the National Register of Historic Places in 1980.
