= Welch-Nicholson House and Mill Site =

Historic house in North Carolina, United States

- U.S. National Register of Historic Places
- Location within North Carolina Location within the United States
- Location: Statesville vicinity, near Houstonville, North Carolina
- Coordinates: 36°02′56″N 80°46′11″W
- Area: 15.3 acres (6.2 ha)
- Built: c. 1795
- Architectural style: Georgian, Federal
- MPS: Iredell County MRA
- NRHP reference No.: 80002858
- Added to NRHP: December 8, 1980

Welch-Nicholson House and Mill Site is a historic home and grist mill site located near Houstonville, Iredell County, North Carolina. The house was built about 1795, and is a two-story, one-room deep, transitional Georgian / Federal style frame dwelling. It has a gable roof, a double shouldered brick chimney, shed rooms across the rear, and a shed roofed front porch. Also on the property are contributing two-story frame barn, log corn crib, and the remains of the Welch-Nicholson House mill and dam.

It was added to the National Register of Historic Places in 1980.
