= St. Philip's Roman Catholic Church (Statesville, North Carolina) =

Historic church in North Carolina, United States

- Key Memorial Chapel
- U.S. National Register of Historic Places
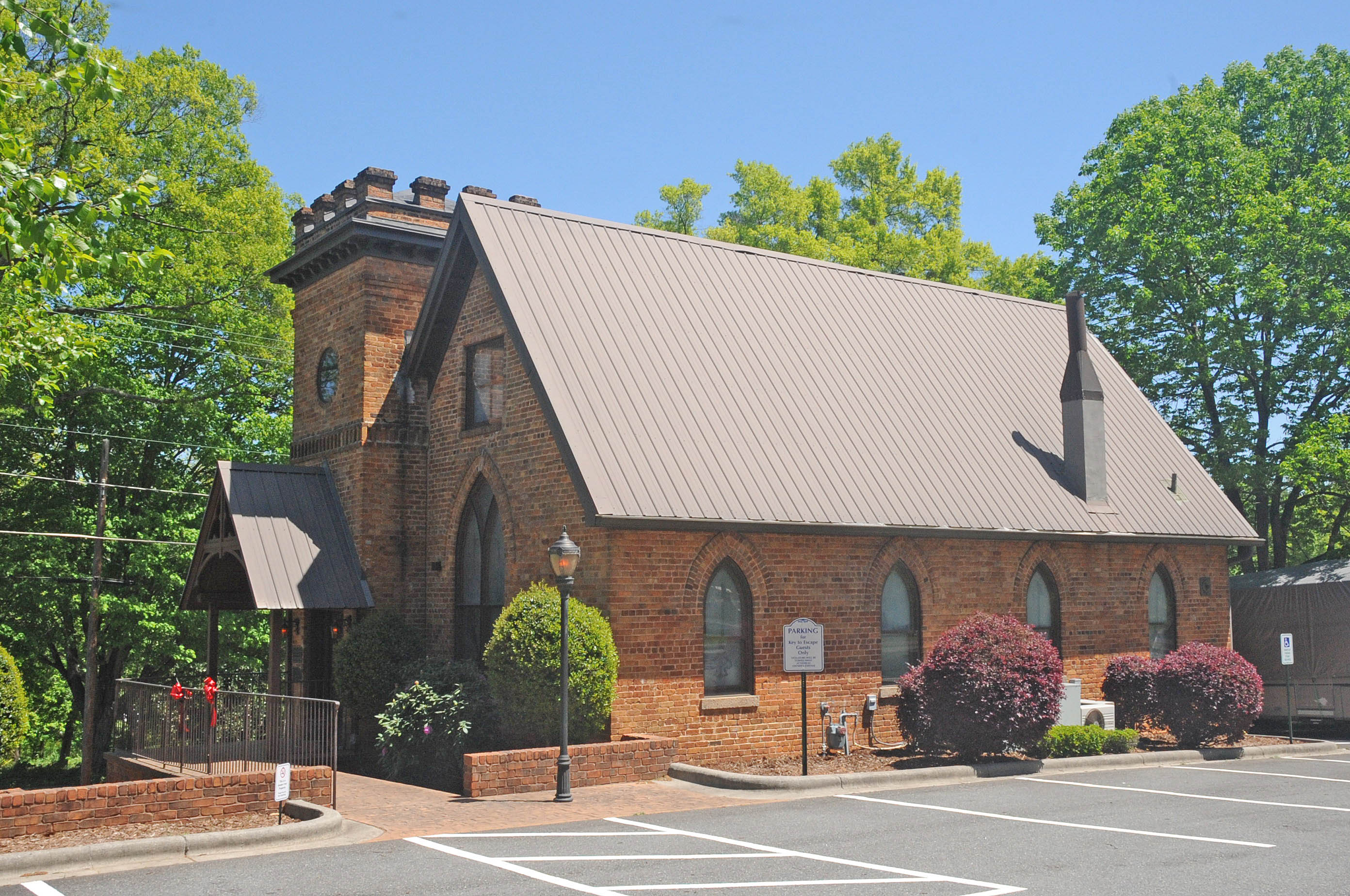

- Location within North Carolina Location within the United States
- Location: 150 E. Sharpe St., Statesville, North Carolina
- Coordinates: 35.7820°N 80.8844°W
- Area: less than one acre
- Built: 1898
- Built by: Lazenby Bros.
- Architectural style: Late Gothic Revival
- MPS: Iredell County MRA
- NRHP reference No.: 80002871
- Added to NRHP: November 24, 1980

Key Memorial Chapel, formerly the parish church of Saint Philip the Apostle, is a historic Catholic chapel located at 150 E. Sharpe Street in Statesville, Iredell County, North Carolina. It is within the Diocese of Charlotte. It was built in 1898, and is a small one-story, two bay by four bay, Late Gothic Revival-style brick building. It features a large, pointed arch stained glass window and a two-story tower with crenellated parapet. It was abandoned by 1976 when the parish was moved to its current location in Statesville, and the chapel was adaptively reused as a law office.

It was added to the National Register of Historic Places in 1980.
