= Hargrave House (Statesville, North Carolina) =

Historic house in North Carolina, United States

- U.S. National Register of Historic Places
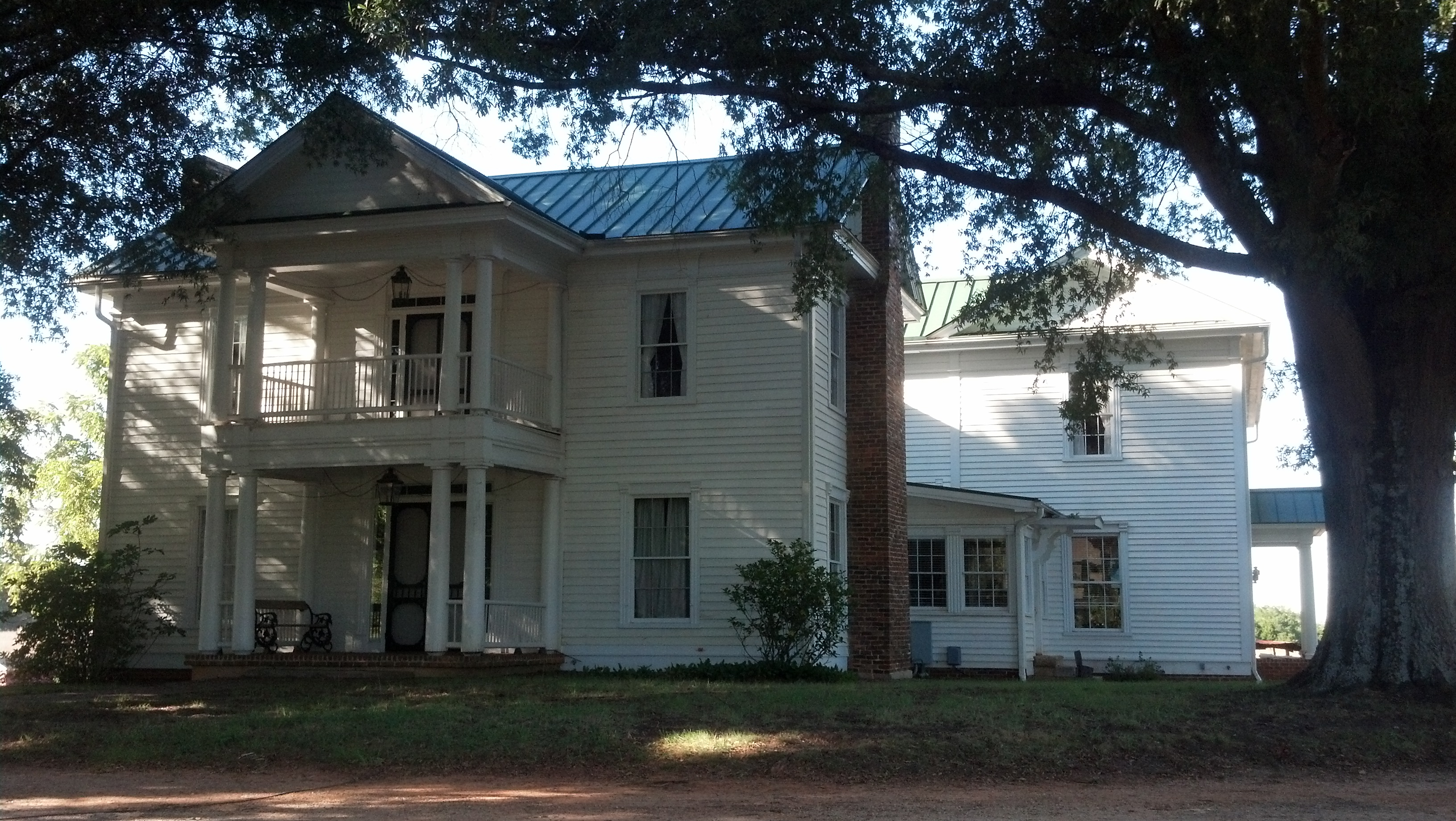
- Hargrave House, September 2012

- Location within North Carolina Location within the United States
- Location: NC 152 and NC 150, near Statesville, North Carolina
- Coordinates: 35°36′14″N 80°46′07″W
- Area: 102 acres (41 ha)
- Architectural style: Greek Revival
- MPS: Iredell County MRA
- NRHP reference No.: 82003473
- Added to NRHP: June 24, 1982

Hargrave House was a historic home located near Statesville, Iredell County, North Carolina. It was built about 1860, and is a two-story, three-bay, Late Greek Revival style frame dwelling. It features a two-story center bay portico supported by Doric order columns. Also on the property is a contributing smokehouse.

It was added to the National Register of Historic Places in 1982.
