= East Broad Street–Davie Avenue Historic District =

Historic district in North Carolina, United States

- U.S. National Register of Historic Places
- U.S. Historic district
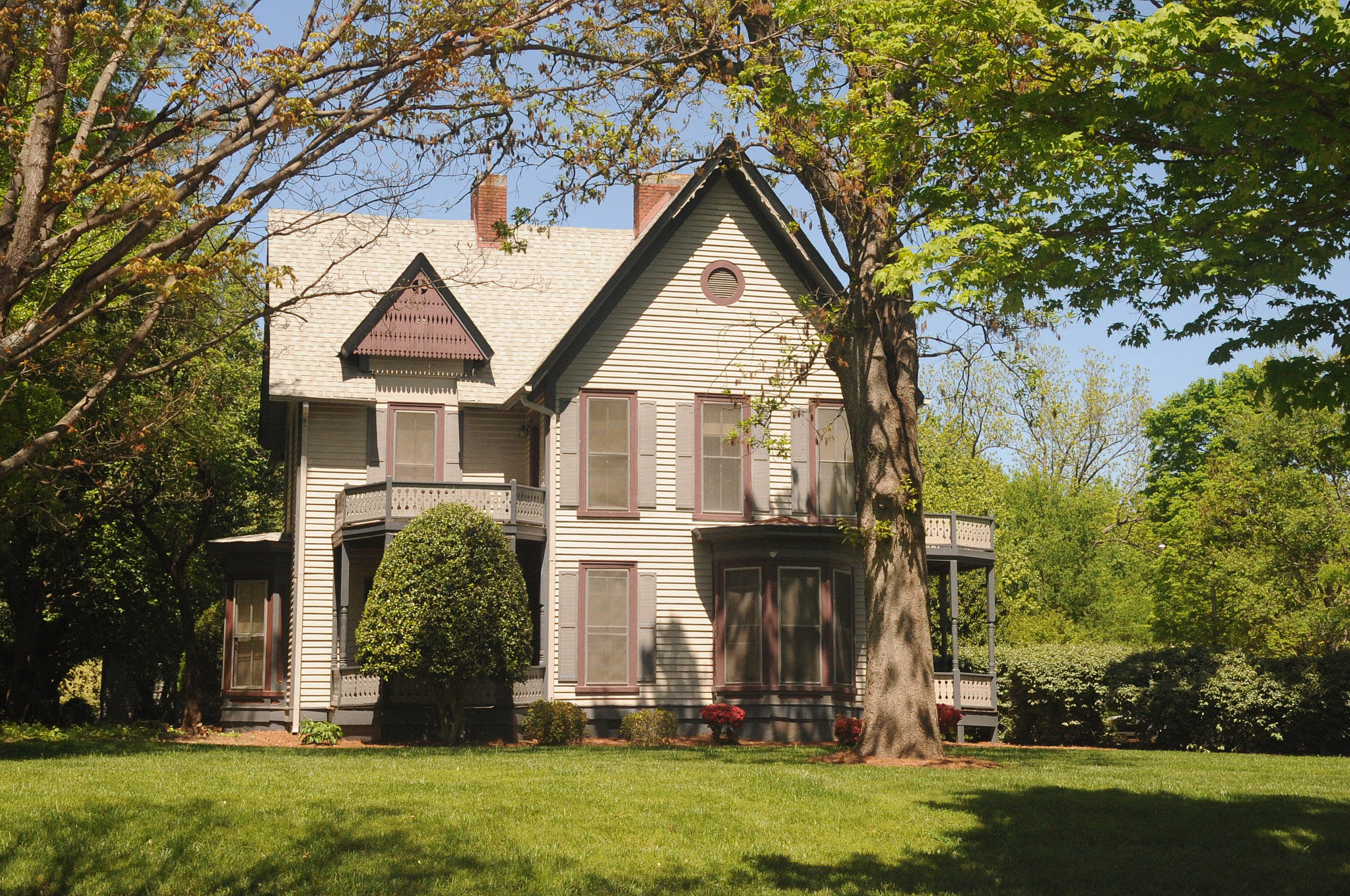
- J. S. Ramsey House

- Location within North Carolina Location within the United States
- Location: Davie Ave., Broad and Elm Sts., Statesville, North Carolina
- Coordinates: 35°47′17″N 80°52′58″W
- Area: 35 acres (14 ha)
- Architect: Multiple
- Architectural style: Late 19th And 20th Century Revivals, Late Victorian
- MPS: Iredell County MRA
- NRHP reference No.: 80002869
- Added to NRHP: November 24, 1980

East Broad Street–Davie Avenue Historic District is a national historic district located at Statesville, Iredell County, North Carolina. It encompasses 65 contributing buildings in a predominantly residential section of Statesville. The district includes notable examples of Late Victorian architecture and were mainly built between about 1880 and 1930. Notable buildings include the Elma Apartments building (late 1920s), Matt-Simons House, J. S. Ramsey House (c. 1885), and Major H. L. Allison House.

It was listed on the National Register of Historic Places in 1980.
