= United States Post Office and County Courthouse (Statesville, North Carolina) =

Historic building in North Carolina, US

- U.S. Post Office and Courthouse
- U.S. National Register of Historic Places
- U.S. Historic district – Contributing property
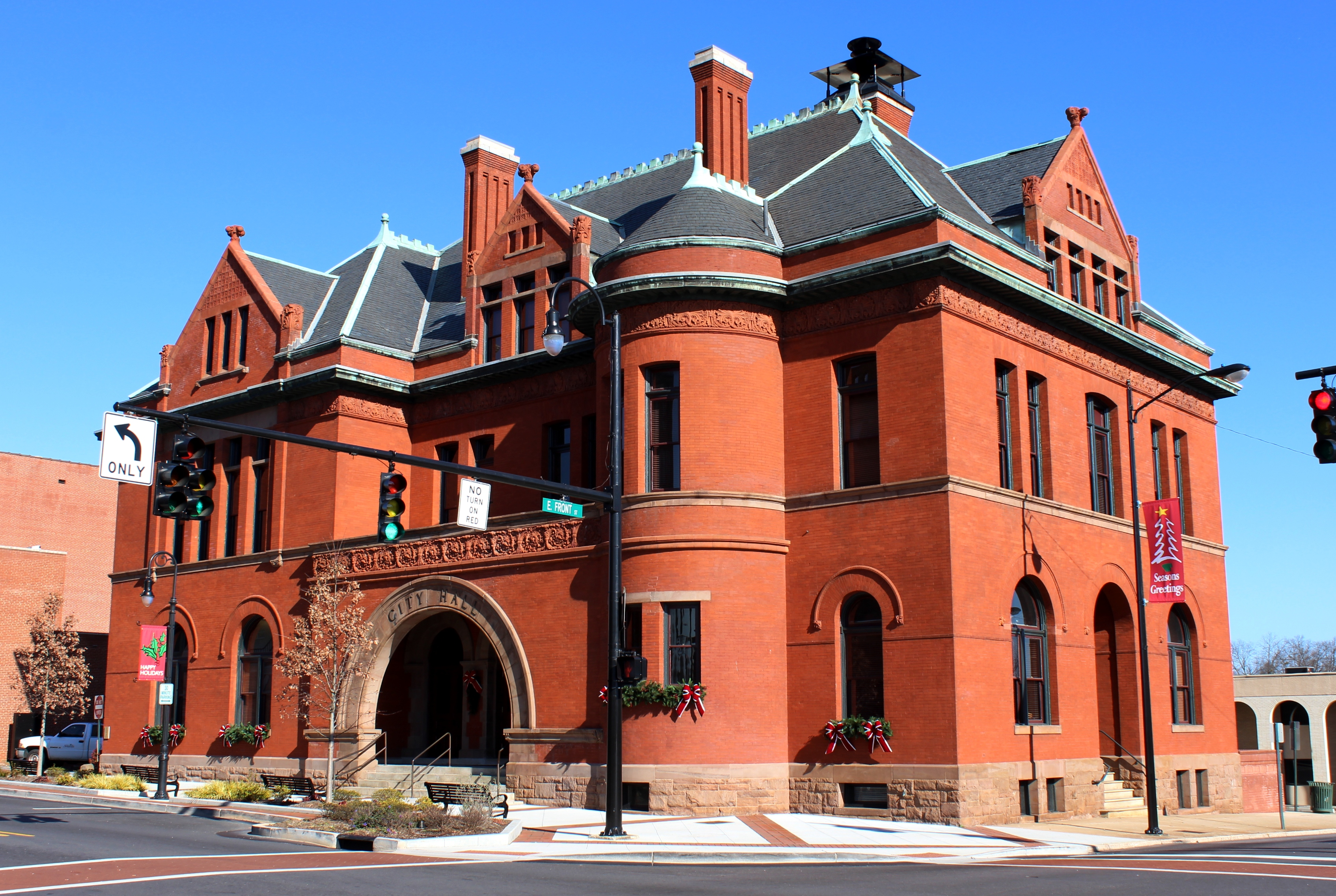

- Location within North Carolina Location within the United States
- Location: 227 S. Center St., Statesville, North Carolina
- Coordinates: 35°46′59″N 80°53′15″W
- Area: 1 acre (0.40 ha)
- Built: 1891
- Architect: Willoughby J. Edbrooke
- Architectural style: Richardsonian Romanesque
- NRHP reference No.: 74001355
- Added to NRHP: January 24, 1974

The U.S. Post Office and Courthouse, also known as Statesville City Hall, is a historic post office and courthouse building located at Statesville, Iredell County, North Carolina. It was designed in the Richardsonian Romanesque style by Willoughby J. Edbrooke and built in 1891. It is a rectangular 2 1/2-story structure, seven bays wide, and three bays deep. It is constructed of red brick and sandstone. The building has a two-story corner tower, a one-story entrance pavilion with central arched recessed entrance, and a tall hip roof.

It was listed on the National Register of Historic Places in 1974. It is located in the Statesville Commercial Historic District.
