= Iredell County Courthouse =

Historic courthouse in North Carolina, US

- U.S. National Register of Historic Places
- U.S. Historic district – Contributing property
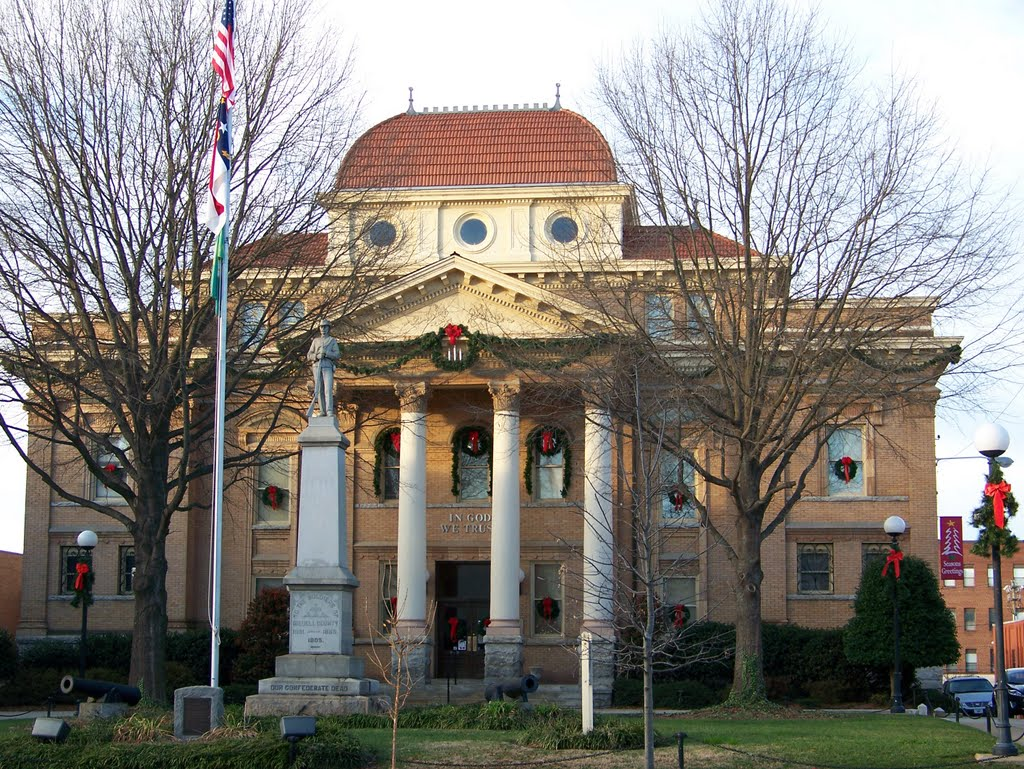
- Iredell County Courthouse, December 2011

- Location within North Carolina Location within the United States
- Location: 200 S. Center St., Statesville, North Carolina
- Coordinates: 35°47′0″N 80°53′19″W
- Area: less than one acre
- Built: 1899
- Built by: Nicholas Ittner
- Architect: Hayden, Wheeler & Schwend
- Architectural style: Beaux Arts
- MPS: North Carolina County Courthouses TR
- NRHP reference No.: 79003434
- Added to NRHP: May 10, 1979

The Iredell County Courthouse is a historic courthouse building located at Statesville, Iredell County, North Carolina. It was built in 1899, and is a two- to three-story, square Beaux Arts building. It is sheathed in yellow brick and consists of a center five-bay wide three-story block, topped with a mansard cupola and fronted by a two-story tetrastyle pedimented portico, and flanking one-bay wide two-story wings.

It was listed on the National Register of Historic Places in 1979. It is located in the Statesville Commercial Historic District.
