= McElwee Houses =

Historic house in North Carolina, United States

- U.S. National Register of Historic Places
- U.S. Historic district
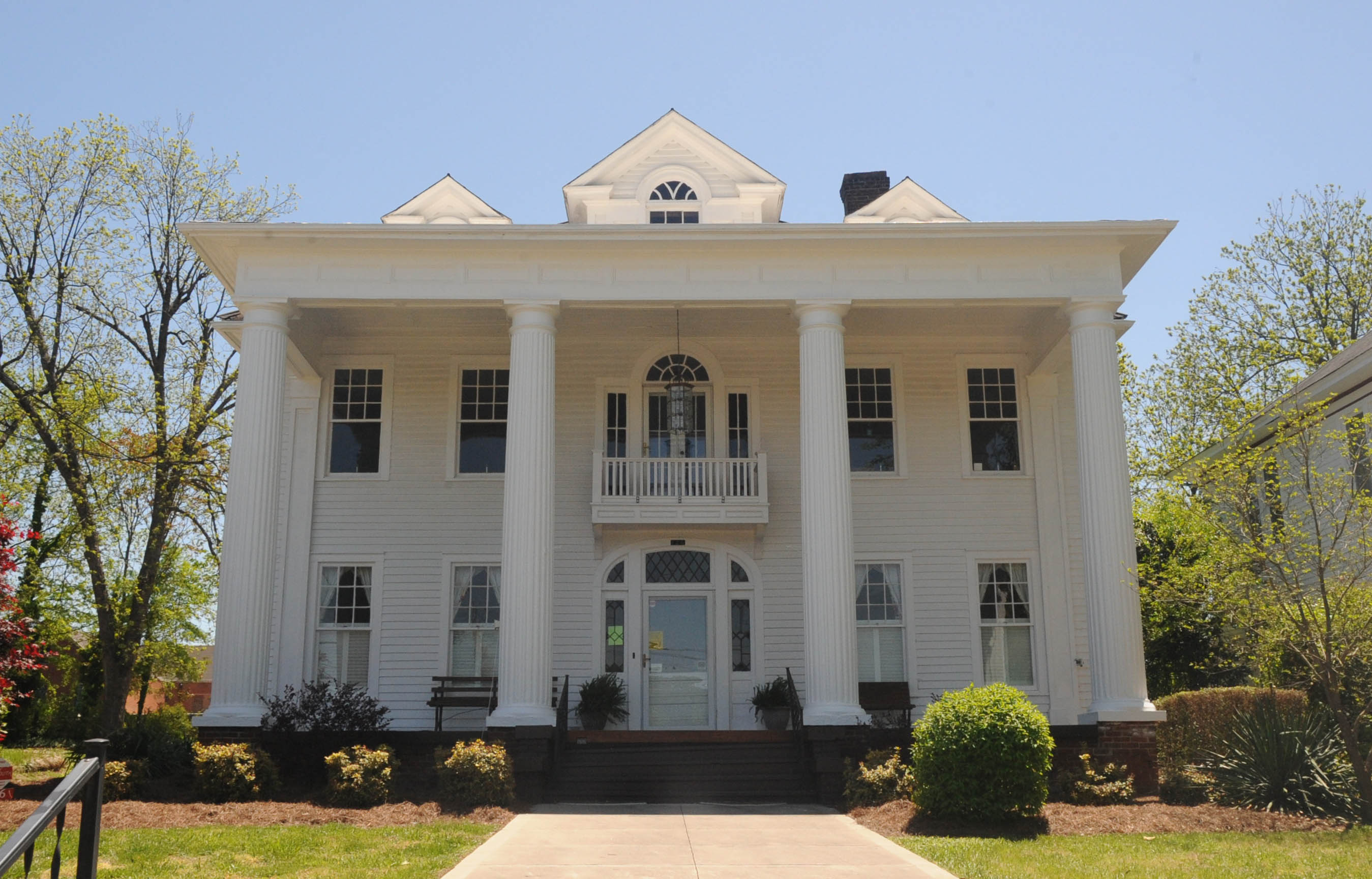

- Location within North Carolina Location within the United States
- Location: 122, 126, 134 and 140 Water St., Statesville, North Carolina
- Coordinates: 35°47′11″N 80°53′15″W
- Area: 1.5 acres (0.61 ha)
- Architectural style: Classical Revival, Colonial Revival, Neo-Classical Revival
- MPS: Iredell County MRA
- NRHP reference No.: 80002874
- Added to NRHP: November 24, 1980

McElwee Houses is a national historic district located at Statesville, Iredell County, North Carolina. It encompasses four contributing buildings in a predominantly residential section of Statesville. The district includes notable examples of Classical Revival and Colonial Revival architecture and were built in the first decade of the 20th century. They were built by members of the John H. McElwee family, a prominent family of industrialists in the late-19th and early-20th century.

It was listed on the National Register of Historic Places in 1980.
