= Morrison-Mott House =

Historic house in North Carolina, United States

- U.S. National Register of Historic Places
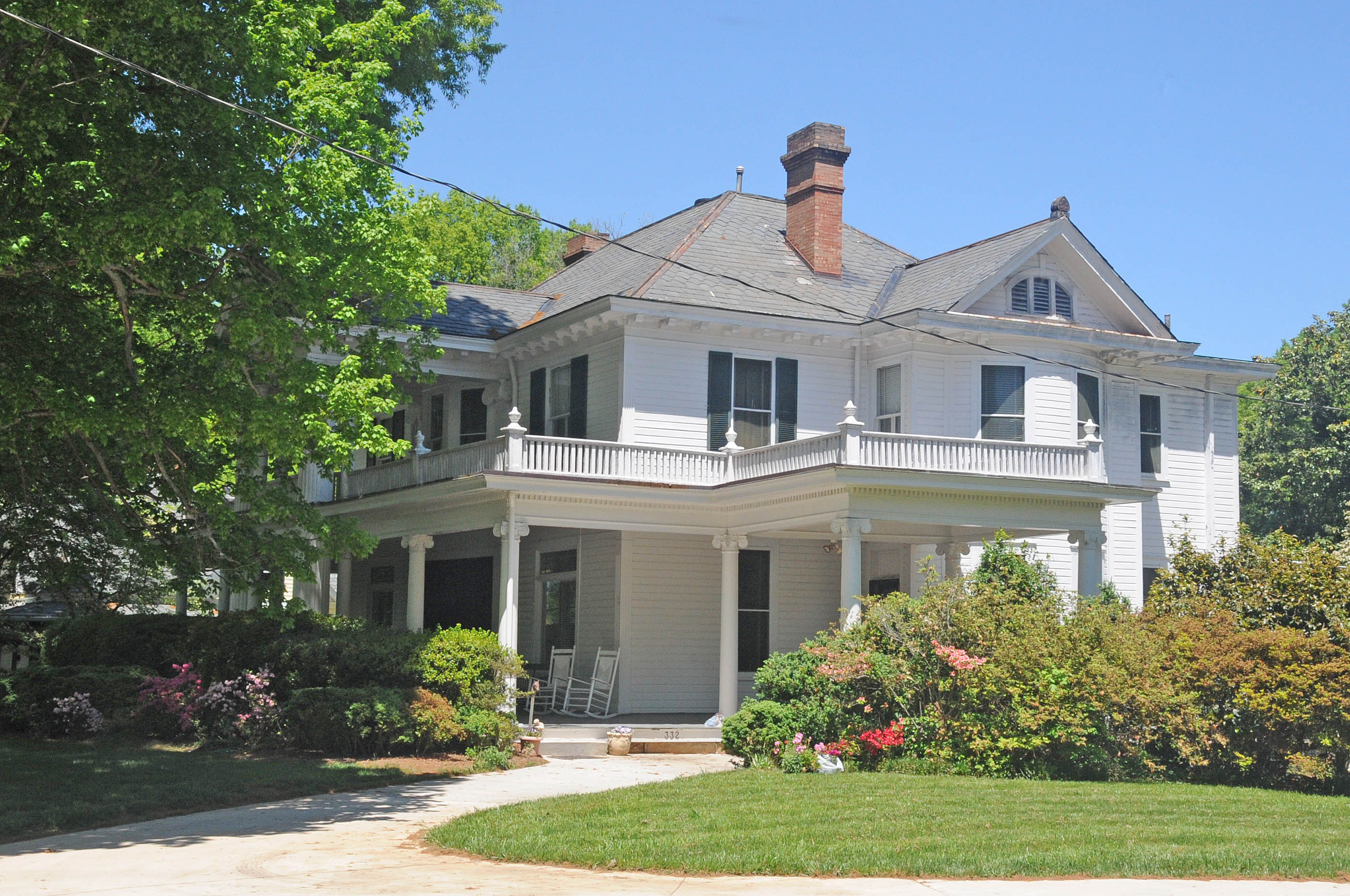

- Location within North Carolina Location within the United States
- Location: 332 N. Center St., Statesville, North Carolina
- Coordinates: 35°47′21″N 80°53′25″W
- Area: less than one acre
- Built: 1904-1905
- Architectural style: Classical Revival
- MPS: Iredell County MRA
- NRHP reference No.: 80002876
- Added to NRHP: November 24, 1980

Morrison-Mott House is a historic home located at Statesville, Iredell County, North Carolina. The house was built about 1904–1905, and is a two-story, three-bay, Classical Revival style frame dwelling. It features a two-story, center bay portico, one-story Ionic order wraparound porch, and porte-cochère.

It was added to the National Register of Historic Places in 1980.
