= Statesville, North Carolina =

- City
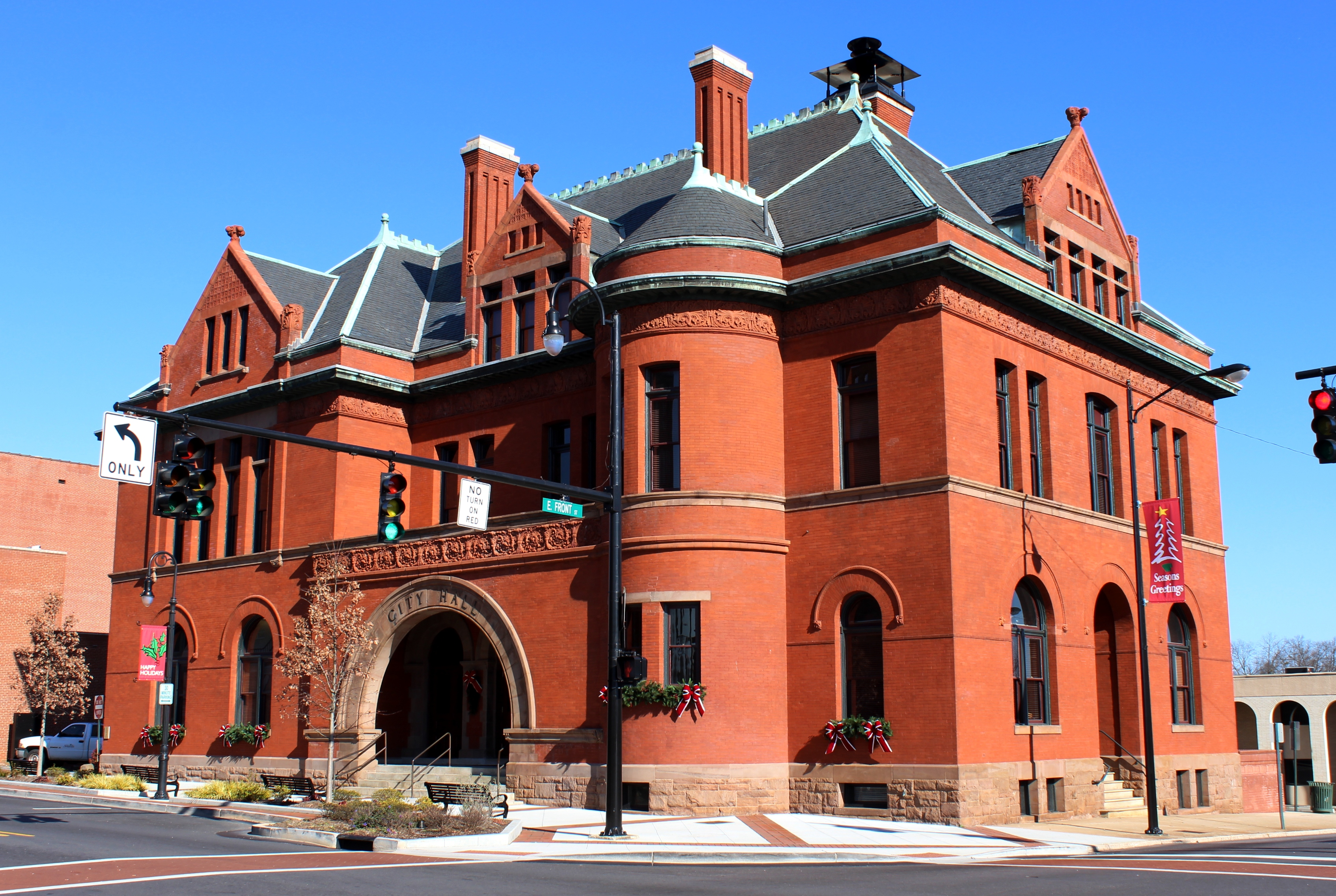
- Statesville City Hall, built c. 1890–92

- Seal Logo

- Location within North Carolina Location within the United States
- Coordinates: 35°47′03″N 80°52′18″W
- Country: United States
- State: North Carolina
- County: Iredell

Government
  - Mayor: Doug Hendrix

Area
  - Total: 25.44 sq mi (65.88 km^{2})
  - Land: 25.32 sq mi (65.59 km^{2})
  - Water: 0.11 sq mi (0.29 km^{2})
- Elevation: 850 ft (260 m)

Population (2020)
  - Total: 28,419
  - Density: 1,122.2/sq mi (433.28/km^{2})
- Time zone: UTC−5 (Eastern (EST))
  - Summer (DST): UTC−4 (EDT)
- ZIP Codes: 28625, 28677, 28687
- Area codes: 704, 980
- FIPS code: 37-64740
- GNIS feature ID: 2405526
- Website: www.statesvillenc.net

Statesville is a city in Iredell County, North Carolina, United States, and its county seat. The population was 28,419 at the time of the 2020 census. Statesville was established in 1789 by an act of the North Carolina Legislature. It is part of the Charlotte metropolitan area.

== History ==
In 1753, Scots-Irish Presbyterians and German Lutherans, who had originally settled in Pennsylvania, began arriving in what would become Statesville in 1789 to plant crops in the fertile soil where game and water were also plentiful. The settlement, known as Fourth Creek Congregation, was named for the freshwater stream running to the north of the present-day city center, the fourth creek west of the neighboring settlement of Salisbury. The center of the settlement was a log cabin where the Presbyterians worshiped and where the First Presbyterian Church is located today.

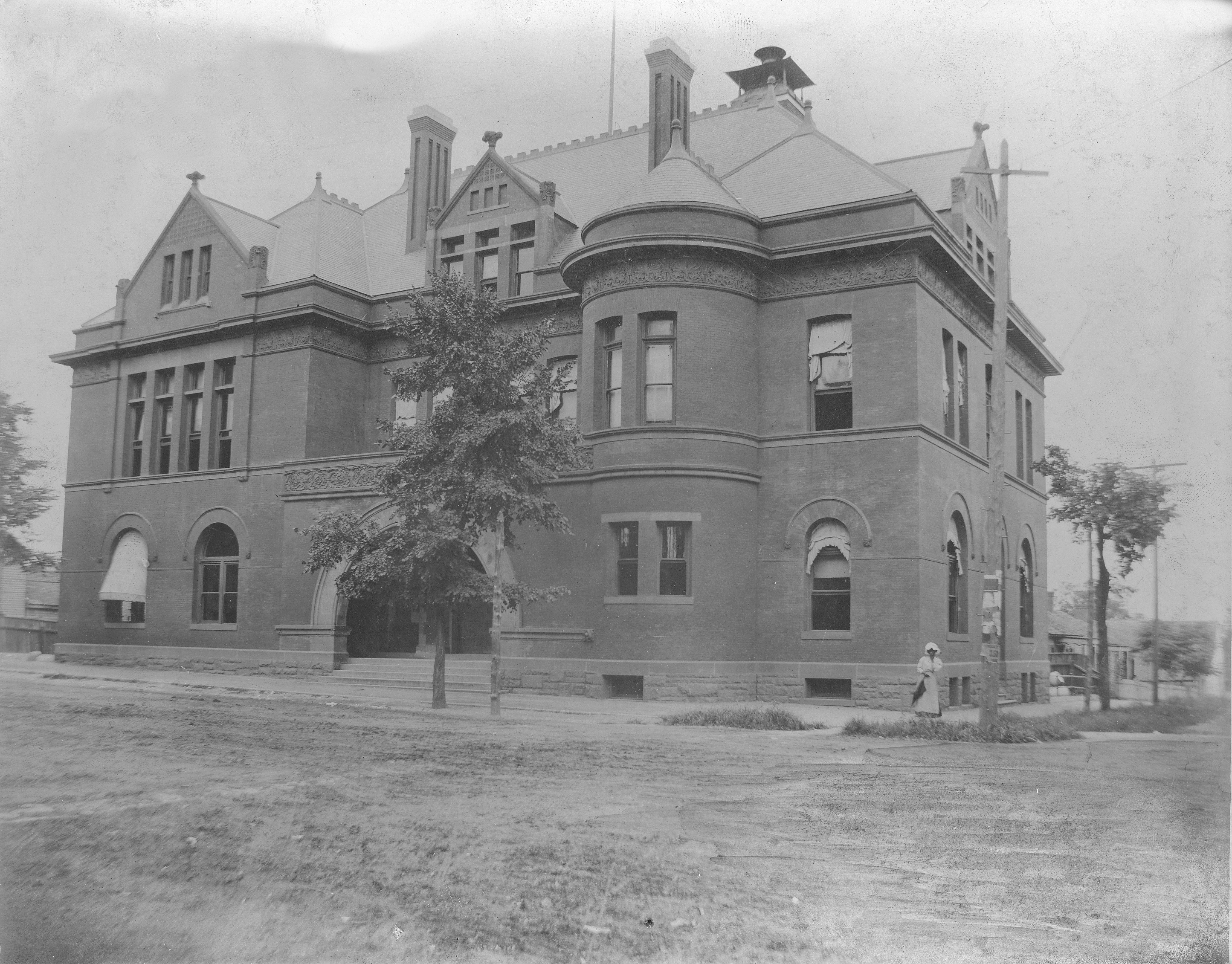
U.S. Court House and Post Office in 1900

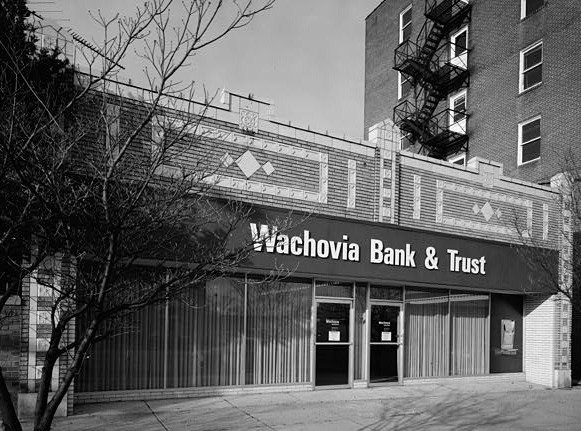
Madison building in Statesville Commercial Historic District (1982)

In 1755, colonial governor Arthur Dobbs authorized the construction of the colony's frontier fort, which was located approximately 3 miles (5 km) due north of the Fourth Creek settlement. Built and garrisoned by North Carolina provincial soldiers, Fort Dobbs defended British North America's western frontier in the colony of North Carolina during the French and Indian War and Anglo-Cherokee War. Fort Dobbs combined the functions of a military barracks, fortification, refuge for settlers, provisioning depot and center for negotiations with Native Americans.

The state legislature divided Rowan County in 1788, and the new county was named "Iredell" for James Iredell, associate justice of the first Supreme Court during the presidency of George Washington.

One year later, the legislature selected a spot for the county seat. The Fourth Creek Congregation was chosen, and the settlement became known as "Statesville". The 1800 US Census lists the town as "States Ville", which was later combined as "Statesville". In 1800, there were 95 inhabitants in "States Ville", including 68 free white persons and 27 slaves.

As early as 1833, Statesville's leaders began laying track for railroads to connect the Piedmont area of North Carolina with the rest of the country.

By 1858, Statesville was growing rapidly and soon afterward began leading the state in the production of tobacco and tobacco products, the manufacture and blending of whiskey, and became a large distribution center for roots and herbs.

On August 27, 1891, a passenger train derailed on the Bostian Bridge, a 300-foot-long (91 m) bridge, and seven cars fell down. About 30 people died in the accident.

== Geography ==
Statesville is in central Iredell County, in the western part of the Piedmont region of North Carolina.

According to the U.S. Census Bureau, Statesville has a total area of 24.4 square miles (63.1 km^{2}), of which 24.2 square miles (62.8 km^{2}) are land and 0.1 square miles (0.3 km^{2}), or 0.48%, are water. The north side of Statesville is drained by Fourth Creek, while the south side is drained by Third Creek. Both creeks flow east, joining just before reaching the South Yadkin River near Cooleemee.

=== Climate ===
Statesville has a humid subtropical climate (Cfa) like most of the state of North Carolina, although its higher elevation leads to cooler temperatures than much of the Piedmont. Summers are generally hot and humid, with mild nights, while winters are usually cool with chilly nights and sporadic snowfall. Severe thunderstorms can be an issue during summer, with wind speeds of 60 mph and even gusts of 95 mph being recorded during these storms.

Climate data for Statesville
Month	Jan	Feb	Mar	Apr	May	Jun	Jul	Aug	Sep	Oct	Nov	Dec	Year
Record high °F (°C)	81 (27)	83 (28)	93 (34)	95 (35)	99 (37)	105 (41)	105 (41)	106 (41)	104 (40)	96 (36)	85 (29)	80 (27)	106 (41)
Mean daily maximum °F (°C)	48.8 (9.3)	52.9 (11.6)	60.5 (15.8)	70.1 (21.2)	77.4 (25.2)	84.1 (28.9)	87.3 (30.7)	85.5 (29.7)	79.7 (26.5)	70.8 (21.6)	60 (16)	51.6 (10.9)	69.1 (20.6)
Daily mean °F (°C)	37.6 (3.1)	40.6 (4.8)	47.6 (8.7)	56.9 (13.8)	65.5 (18.6)	73.3 (22.9)	77.0 (25.0)	75.4 (24.1)	69.2 (20.7)	56.3 (13.5)	47.1 (8.4)	37.9 (3.3)	57.0 (13.9)
Mean daily minimum °F (°C)	26.4 (−3.1)	28.4 (−2.0)	34.7 (1.5)	43.7 (6.5)	53.6 (12.0)	62.5 (16.9)	66.8 (19.3)	65.2 (18.4)	58.8 (14.9)	45.8 (7.7)	34.3 (1.3)	28.9 (−1.7)	45.8 (7.6)
Record low °F (°C)	−8 (−22)	−7 (−22)	5 (−15)	17 (−8)	28 (−2)	36 (2)	44 (7)	44 (7)	30 (−1)	16 (−9)	6 (−14)	−3 (−19)	−8 (−22)
Average precipitation inches (mm)	3.71 (94)	3.18 (81)	3.99 (101)	4.05 (103)	3.70 (94)	4.27 (108)	4.42 (112)	4.91 (125)	3.87 (98)	3.23 (82)	3.38 (86)	3.94 (100)	46.65 (1,184)
Average snowfall inches (cm)	2.4 (6.1)	0.8 (2.0)	0.4 (1.0)	0 (0)	0 (0)	0 (0)	0 (0)	0 (0)	0 (0)	0 (0)	0 (0)	1.3 (3.3)	4.9 (12.4)
Source: NOAA

== Demographics ==
Historical population
Census	Pop.	Note	%±
1800	95		—
1850	215		—
1860	320		48.8%
1870	683		113.4%
1880	1,062		55.5%
1890	2,318		118.3%
1900	3,141		35.5%
1910	4,599		46.4%
1920	7,895		71.7%
1930	10,490		32.9%
1940	11,440		9.1%
1950	16,901		47.7%
1960	19,844		17.4%
1970	20,007		0.8%
1980	18,622		−6.9%
1990	17,567		−5.7%
2000	23,320		32.7%
2010	24,532		5.2%
2020	28,419		15.8%
2025 (est.)	32,181	▲	13.2%
U.S. Decennial Census

=== 2020 census ===
Statesville racial composition
Race	Number	Percentage
White	14,688	51.7%
Black or African American	9,210	32.4%
American Indian and Alaska Native	97	0.3%
Asian	548	1.9%
Native Hawaiian and Other Pacific Islander	2	0.0%
Some other race	1,728	6.1%
Two or more races	2,146	7.6%
Hispanic or Latino (of any race)	3,309	11.6%

As of the 2020 census, Statesville had a population of 28,419. The median age was 38.7 years. 23.5% of residents were under the age of 18 and 17.9% of residents were 65 years of age or older. For every 100 females there were 88.8 males, and for every 100 females age 18 and over there were 85.3 males age 18 and over.

99.5% of residents lived in urban areas, while 0.5% lived in rural areas.

There were 11,424 households in Statesville, of which 30.5% had children under the age of 18 living in them. Of all households, 35.7% were married-couple households, 19.5% were households with a male householder and no spouse or partner present, and 37.8% were households with a female householder and no spouse or partner present. About 32.9% of all households were made up of individuals and 14.1% had someone living alone who was 65 years of age or older.

There were 12,435 housing units, of which 8.1% were vacant. The homeowner vacancy rate was 2.3% and the rental vacancy rate was 5.2%.

=== 2010 census ===
As of the census of 2010, there were 24,633 people, 9,338 households, and 5,957 families residing in the city. The population density was 1,195.8 inhabitants per square mile (461.7/km^{2}). There were 10,041 housing units at an average density of 489.1 per square mile (188.8/km^{2}). The racial composition of the city was: 59.94% White, 31.87% Black or African American, 7.11% Hispanic or Latino American, 2.71% Asian American, 0.18% Native American, 0.02% Native Hawaiian or Other Pacific Islander, 3.84% some other races, and 1.42% two or more races.

There were 9,338 households, out of which 28.1% had children under the age of 18 living with them, 41.7% were married couples living together, 17.9% had a female householder with no husband present, and 36.2% were non-families. 31.4% of all households were made up of individuals, and 12.7% had someone living alone who was 65 years of age or older. The average household size was 2.39 and the average family size was 2.99.

In the city, the population was spread out, with 24.4% under the age of 18, 8.7% from 18 to 24, 28.0% from 25 to 44, 21.4% from 45 to 64, and 17.4% who were 65 years of age or older. The median age was 37 years. For every 100 females, there were 86.5 males. For every 100 females age 18 and over, there were 82.0 males.

The median income for a household in the city was $31,925, and the median income for a family was $41,694. Males had a median income of $31,255 versus $22,490 for females. The per capita income for the city was $19,328. About 12.7% of families and 16.1% of the population were below the poverty line, including 23.7% of those under age 18 and 13.8% of those age 65 or over.

== Arts and culture ==
=== Historic sites ===
- Academy Hill Historic District
- Center Street A.M.E. Zion Church, built in 1903
- Congregation Emanuel is one of fewer than a hundred nineteenth-century synagogue buildings still standing in the United States.
- East Broad Street–Davie Avenue Historic District
- Fourth Creek Burial Ground, burials from 1759
- Iredell County Courthouse, built in 1899
- Key Memorial Chapel, also known as St. Philips Roman Catholic Church, built in 1898
- Main Building, Mitchell College, built in 1854-1856
- McElwee Houses, built in the late 1800s and early 1900s
- Mitchell College Historic District, buildings dating from 1857 to 1930
- Morrison-Mott House, built about 1904 to 1905
- Col. Silas Alexander Sharpe House, built about 1860 or 1865
- South Race Street Historic District, 85 buildings built in the late 1800s and early 1900s
- Statesville Commercial Historic District, 54 buildings built between 1875 and 1925
- Henry Turner House and Caldwell–Turner Mill Site, built about 1860
- United States Post Office and County Courthouse, built in 1891

=== Museums ===
The Governor Zebulon Vance House and Museum is operated by the United Daughters of the Confederacy; Vance lived in the house at the end of the U.S. Civil War. Other museums include Iredell Museums, Heritage Museum, and The Children's Museum.

== Sports ==
Statesville was home to a minor league baseball teams of various names, mainly the Statesville Owls, from 1939 until 1969. They played in several leagues over the years including the Tar Heel League (1939–1940), North Carolina State League (1942, 1947–1952), Western Carolina League (1960–1962), and Western Carolinas League (1963–1969). They were league champions in their respective league in 1940, 1948, and 1962. The field was located at Statesville Senior High School and thus named Senior High Stadium.

== Education ==
The city is part of the Iredell–Statesville School District. Schools within the city limits include East Iredell Elementary, N.B. Mills Elementary, Oakwood Middle School, Pressly Elementary, and Statesville High School. Schools serving Statesville residents but located outside the city limits include Cloverleaf Elementary School, East Iredell Middle School, and Third Creek Elementary School.

Wayside Elementary School was an elementary school located off Salisbury Road in eastern Statesville. The current school building opened in 1941 and closed in 2002 when Wayside School and Alan D. Rutherford School merged to form Third Creek Elementary. The former Wayside building is currently home to the UAW 3520 headquarters, while the former Alan D. Rutherford site is home to the Iredell-Statesville Schools Administrative Annex, now known as the Alan D. Rutherford Education Building.

Statesville Christian School is a non-denominational K4–12 private school serving the greater Statesville area.

Mitchell Community College, founded as a Presbyterian women's college in 1852, is now a public community college. In the 2008–2009 academic year, it became the first community college in the United States to be accepted into NASA's University Student Launch Initiative competition.

== Media ==
=== Print ===
- The Statesville Record & Landmark is Statesville's daily newspaper, primarily serving Iredell County. It is published seven days a week.

=== Radio ===
- WAME, "Real Country 550 & 92.9" is an AM/FM station at 550 kHz and 92.9 mHz that plays classic country music.
- WSIC, 1400 AM & 100.7 FM, has a news-talk format.

In addition, the signals of many stations from the Charlotte area and Piedmont Triad region reach Statesville.

== Infrastructure ==
=== Highways ===
Interstate 40 and Interstate 77 intersect in the northeastern part of the city, and US 21, US 64, and US 70 run through the center of Statesville.

== Notable people ==
- Gair Allie (1931–2016), former MLB player
- Julianne Baird (born 1952), soprano singer
- Breon Borders (born 1995), NFL defensive back
- Hayne D. Boyden (1897–1978), Naval aviator and Brigadier general, USMC
- Johnny Chapman (born 1967), stock car racing driver
- Mildred Stafford Cherry (1894–1971), First Lady of North Carolina
- Louis "Pinky" Clarke (1901–1977), Olympic gold medal winner in 4x100 m relay at 1924 Summer Olympics
- Chris Cole (born 1982), professional skateboarder
- Blake Crouch (born 1978), author and producer
- Jake Crum (born 1991), driver in the NASCAR Truck Series
- Mark Davidson (born 1961), former outfielder for the Minnesota Twins and Houston Astros
- Richmond P. Davis (1866–1937), US Army major general
- Jerome Henderson (born 1969), NFL cornerback
- Columbus Vance Henkel, Jr. (1908–1971), five-term North Carolina Senator; editor of "The Blowing Rocket"
- Rockie Lynne (born 1964), country music artist
- Danny Malboeuf (born 1960), visual artist combining surrealism with other genres
- Thomas Marshburn (born 1960), NASA astronaut
- Barry Moore (born 1943), former MLB pitcher
- Justin Moose (born 1983), professional soccer player
- William Stevens Powell (1919–2015), historian, author, teacher, and librarian known for his extensive work on the history of North Carolina, lived in Statesville
- Stephen C. Reber, Archbishop of the United Episcopal Church of North America
- William Sharpe (1742–1818), lawyer, politician, American Revolution patriot, and a delegate to the Continental Congress
- Mike Skinner (born 1957), NASCAR driver
- Vinson Smith (born 1965), NFL linebacker
- Herm Starrette (1936–2017), former Major League Baseball pitcher and coach
- T.M. Stikeleather (1848–1934), populist representative in 1894 and 1900 for the 27th district, which included Iredell, Davie and Yadkin counties
- Theodore Taylor (1921–2006), writer
- Jared Watts (born 1992), Major League Soccer player
