= John Nathaniel Stirewalt =

Virginia based Lutheran minister of the late 1800s

- Born: February 21, 1844; New Market, Virginia
- Died: January 11, 1907 (aged 62); Page County, Virginia
- Occupation: Pastor
- Years active: 1869–1906
- Religion: Lutheran
- Ordained: 1871

The Reverend John Nathaniel Stirewalt was a Lutheran minister serving in Page County, Virginia, from 1869 to 1906. He was born on February 21, 1844, in New Market, Virginia. He died on January 11, 1907, at the age of 62 years, 10 months, and 21 days, at his home near Luray, Virginia. He is buried in Green Hill Cemetery, Luray, Virginia.

Stirewalt was the son of the Reverend Jacob Stirewalt and his wife Henrietta Henkel. He was baptized as an infant and at an early age confirmed in the Lutheran church. He attended New Market Academy and Roanoke College. He later studied theology under his father. He began pastoral work in 1869 and was ordained on May 29, 1871, by the Evangelical Lutheran Tennessee Synod. With the exception of one year spent in Indiana, he spent his entire ministerial career in one pastorate in Page County, Virginia, in the Tennessee Synod. He was the first resident Lutheran pastor of Page County. During his ministry he was pastor of Mount Calvary Lutheran Church. He organized six Lutheran congregations, five of which were Morning Star (organized November 29, 1873), Grace (organized March 10, 1877), St. Mark's (organized 1876), St. James’ (Rileyville, organized 1884), and Beth Eden (organized December 31, 1896). He was president of the Tennessee Synod: in 1896 and treasurer in 1873, 1883–1885, and 1887–1892.
