= Mooresville High School =

Mooresville High School may refer to:

- Mooresville High School (Indiana), in Mooresville, Indiana
- Mooresville High School (North Carolina), in Mooresville, North Carolina
