= Justin Jarvis (baseball) =

American baseball player (born 2000)

High Point Rockers – No. 34
- Pitcher
- Born: February 20, 2000 (age 26); Concord, North Carolina, U.S.
- Bats: Right Throws: Right

Justin Jarvis (born February 20, 2000) is an American professional baseball pitcher for the High Point Rockers of the Atlantic League of Professional Baseball.

== Career ==
=== Amateur career ===
Jarvis attended Mooresville High School in Mooresville, North Carolina, before transferring to Lake Norman High School in Mooresville for his senior year in 2018. As a senior in 2018, he threw a perfect game and went 8–2 with a 1.60 ERA and 95 strikeouts over 57 innings. After the season, he was selected by the Milwaukee Brewers in the fifth round with the 155th overall selection of the 2018 Major League Baseball draft. He signed with the Brewers, forgoing his commitment to play college baseball at the University of North Carolina Wilmington.

=== Milwaukee Brewers ===
Jarvis made his professional debut in 2018 with the Arizona League Brewers, pitching to a 6.63 ERA over 19 innings. He played the 2019 season with the Wisconsin Timber Rattlers, pitching in 18 games (11 starts) and going 4–1 with a 3.50 ERA and 52 strikeouts over 74 2/3 innings. After not playing a game in 2020 due to the cancellation of the minor league season, he returned to Wisconsin in 2021, going 1–7 with a 5.40 ERA and 62 strikeouts over 17 starts. He played in the Arizona Fall League for the Salt River Rafters following the end of the season. He opened the 2022 season back with Wisconsin and was promoted to the Biloxi Shuckers in August. Over 28 starts between the two teams, he went 11–9 with a 3.83 ERA and 150 strikeouts over 141 innings. He returned to Biloxi to open the 2023 season. In late June, he was promoted to the Nashville Sounds.

=== New York Mets ===
On July 31, 2023, the Brewers traded Jarvis to the New York Mets in exchange for Mark Canha. He was assigned to the Syracuse Mets. Over 26 starts between Biloxi, Nashville, and Syracuse, he went 6-11 with a 5.31 ERA and 138 strikeouts over 118 2/3 innings. Jarvis played the 2024 season with the Double-A Binghamton Mets and Syracuse, going 6-5 with a 4.55 ERA over 87 innings pitched. He elected free agency following the season on November 4, 2024.

=== Los Angeles Dodgers ===
On December 17, 2024, Jarvis signed a minor league contract with the Los Angeles Dodgers. He appeared in 13 games for the Triple-A Oklahoma City Comets, starting 10 of them with a 3–2 record and 6.38 ERA; however, Jarvis missed the second half of the season with an undisclosed injury. He elected free agency following the season on November 6, 2025.

=== High Point Rockers ===
On June 12, 2026, Jarvis signed with the High Point Rockers of the Atlantic League of Professional Baseball.
