= Mill Hill (Concord, North Carolina) =

Historic house in North Carolina, United States

- U.S. National Register of Historic Places
- Location within North Carolina Location within the United States
- Location: W of Kannapolis on SR 1616, near Concord, North Carolina
- Coordinates: 35°28′36″N 80°41′59″W
- Area: 9 acres (3.6 ha)
- Built: 1821
- Built by: Jacob Stirewalt
- Architectural style: Greek Revival, Federal
- NRHP reference No.: 74001330
- Added to NRHP: September 10, 1974

Mill Hill near Concord, North Carolina is a historic house built by master craftsman Jacob Stirewalt in 1821. It includes Greek Revival and Federal architectural elements.

A number of its features, including a distinctive fireplace mantel, are documented in a North Carolina State University collection. The Johnson-Neel House is also attributed to Stirewalt, due in part to its having a similar mantelpiece (and is also NRHP-listed).

It was listed on the National Register of Historic Places in 1974.
