= Johnson-Neel House =

Historic house in North Carolina, United States

- U.S. National Register of Historic Places
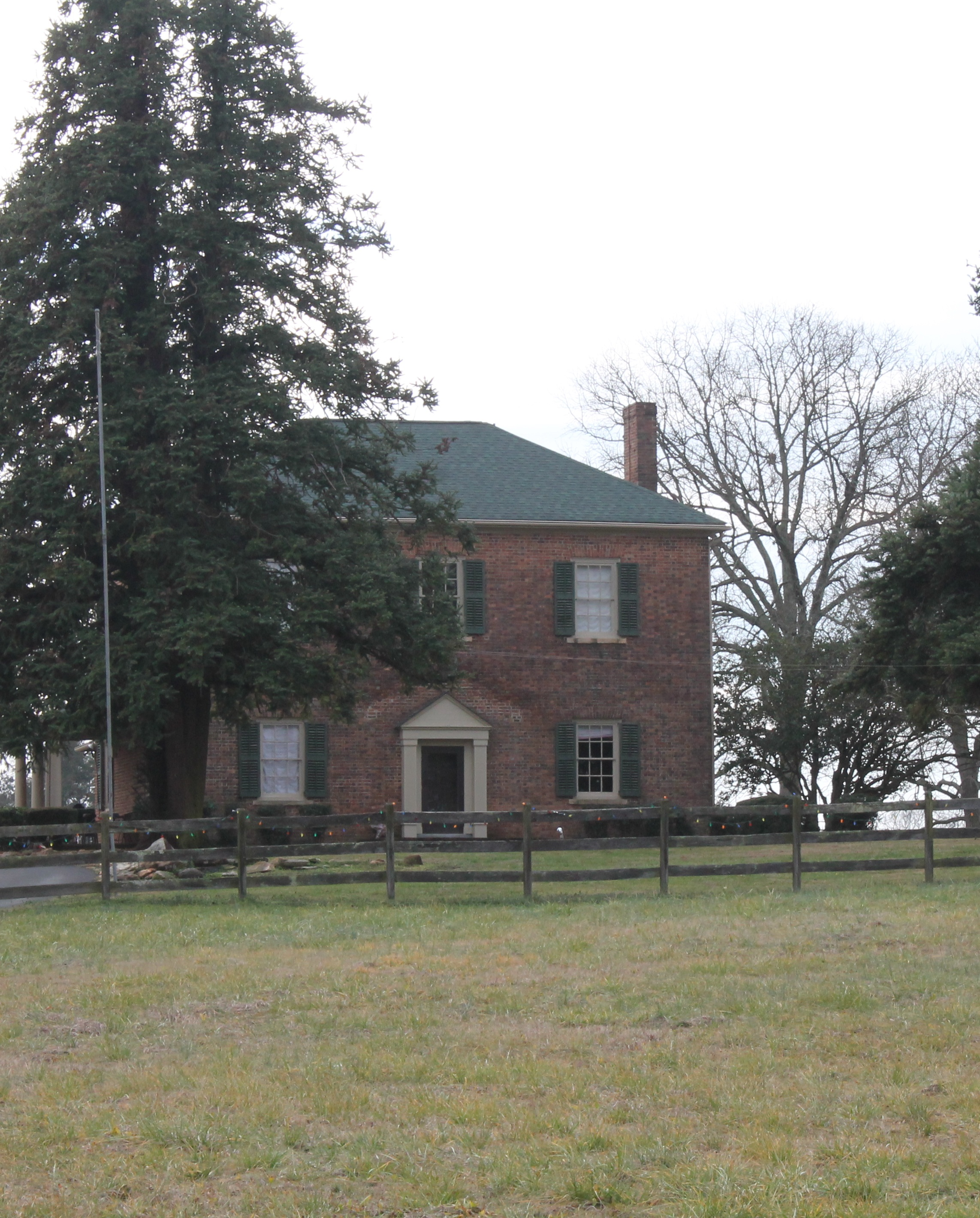
- A view of the Johnson-Neel House from N.C. Highway 150

- Location within North Carolina Location within the United States
- Location: 4 miles (6.4 km) west of Mooresville off NC 150, near Mooresville, North Carolina
- Coordinates: 35°35′46″N 80°53′10″W
- Area: 9.9 acres (4.0 ha)
- Built: c. 1830
- MPS: Iredell County MRA (AD)
- NRHP reference No.: 75001275
- Added to NRHP: June 20, 1975

The Johnson-Neel House is a private historic house near Mooresville, North Carolina. It was listed on the National Register of Historic Places in 1975.

It apparently was built in the 1826–1835 period, probably before 1830. Its construction is attributed to master builder Jacob Stirewalt. Features include a Federal-style stairway including tulip brackets. The building's brickwork is laid in Flemish bond. It also has a fireplace mantel that is very similar to one at Mill Hill, Stirewalt's home in Concord (also NRHP-listed).
