= Peter Schmucker =

Methodist minister (1784–1860)

- Born: August 27, 1784; Reichelsheim, Grand Duchy of Hesse Darmstadt
- Died: December 9, 1860 (aged 76)
- Occupation: Pastor
- Years active: 1813–1848
- Religion: Lutheran and Methodist
- Ordained: 1820

Peter Schmucker (1784–1860) was a Lutheran and later Methodist minister, who served congregations first in Virginia, then in Pennsylvania, Ohio, and other western states.

Johann Peter Schmucker, son of Johann Christoph and Anna Apollonia (Schoenberger) Schmucker, was born on 27 August 1784, in Reichelsheim, Grand Duchy of Hesse Darmstadt. He died on 9 December 1860.

Peter was an infant when his parents immigrated to the United States and settled near Woodstock, Shenandoah County, Virginia. Christoph, his father, was a farmer. Growing up Peter worked on the farm and then learned the carpenter's trade. When he was eighteen [1802-1803] "he experienced a change of heart, at a camp meeting held by the United Brethren." His parents were Lutherans and two of his older brothers, George and Nicholas, had devoted themselves early to the ministry. Peter after his "change of heart" took steps to enter the Lutheran ministry.

In October 1813 Peter Schmucker attended the meeting of the Evangelical Lutheran Synod of North Carolina and was licensed as a Cathechet, the first degree of ministry on the path to ordination as a Lutheran pastor. He had brought letters from four congregations in Virginia (Hawksbill and Solomon's churches in Shenandoah County and Rader's and Paul's churches in Rockingham County) supporting his request and asking to allow these congregations to join the North Carolina Synod. In October 1814 Peter attended the next meeting of the North Carolina Synod and was licensed as a Candidate, the next step towards his ordination as a Lutheran pastor. Peter's labors were greatly blessed with awakenings and conversions, which at that time produced considerable persecution. He was denounced as a Methodist. This did not stop his ordination and on 30 May 1820 Peter was ordained a Lutheran pastor, a member of the German and English Lutheran Synod for North Carolina and adjacent states. At that same synod meeting the North Carolina Synod split. Some of the members of the synod felt it was straying from adherence to confessional Lutheranism and toward unionism. They left the North Carolina Synod and formed the Evangelical Lutheran Tennessee Synod that same year. Peter remained with the North Carolina Synod and was chosen as a delegate to a clerical assembly in Maryland that was meeting for the purpose of forming a General Synod of the Evangelical Lutheran Church of the United States and he was one of those who signed the articles of the Constitution of the General Synod. The churches Peter was ministering to in Virginia joined the Tennessee Synod. Peter left Virginia moved to Pennsylvania and became a member the Evangelical Lutheran Synod of Western Pennsylvania.

In 1822 Peter moved to Newark, Ohio. In Ohio he left the call of full time ministry and pursued secular business during the week. He did continue to labor independently preaching on Sabbath days at Lutheran and other churches in Ohio when the opportunity presented itself. About the year 1832 he and his wife joined the Methodist Episcopal Church and Brother Schmucker began to serve as a Methodist minister. In the fall of 1838 he was persuaded to enter the Ohio Conference in the German mission in Cincinnati, Ohio. In two years the society grew from 30 to 80 members. In the fall of 1840 he was appointed to Louisville, Kentucky, forming a society there that was able to support itself in its first year. “Fearlessly he attacked the strongholds of Satan, and thereby caused soon a great persecution against the "new sect." Stones flew freely into the old frame school-house in which he was preaching, and once a gun was even fired into it, without, however, doing any serious injury.”

In the spring of 1842 Brother Schmucker was sent to New Orleans. After his return from New Orleans he was sent to Evansville, Indiana, but his health failed, and he had to rest six months. In the fall of 1843 he was appointed Superintendent of German missions in the Ohio Conference. The conference was so successful that it was necessary to divide it into two districts. From 1844-1848 Brother Schmucker was put in charge of the Cincinnati district that included all the German missions from Columbus, Ohio, to Evansville, Indiana. He extended the work of this district to Michigan and laid the foundation for a German church in Detroit. He also visited New Orleans a second time. In the spring of 1848 his health gave way and he could not continue his work as the leader of the district. From the Fall of 1848 until his death in 1860 Brother Schmucker was not well and he was mainly confined to his room, his faith in God strong to the end.

William Nast in Brother Schmucker's obituary wrote:

[Brother Schmucker was] a man of such deep piety, long pastoral experience, general intelligence, sound Biblical theology, and pleasing and venerable address as brother S. possessed. He was a man of no ordinary intellect, had read much, and was "great in the Holy Scripture." His exposition of divine truth was clear, forcible, and full of unction. It may be truly said of him, as a minister, that he magnified his office. He was humble, yet dignified; mild and affable, yet quick to reprove sin. He was an excellent sermonizer, and the homiletical instructions which he gave as presiding elder to the young German preachers, who had not enjoyed a liberal education, were invaluable. With his theological erudition he combined a poetical genius. He wrote a great deal of sacred poetry, in English as well as German, of which he, however, published but little.
