= John Franklin Moore =

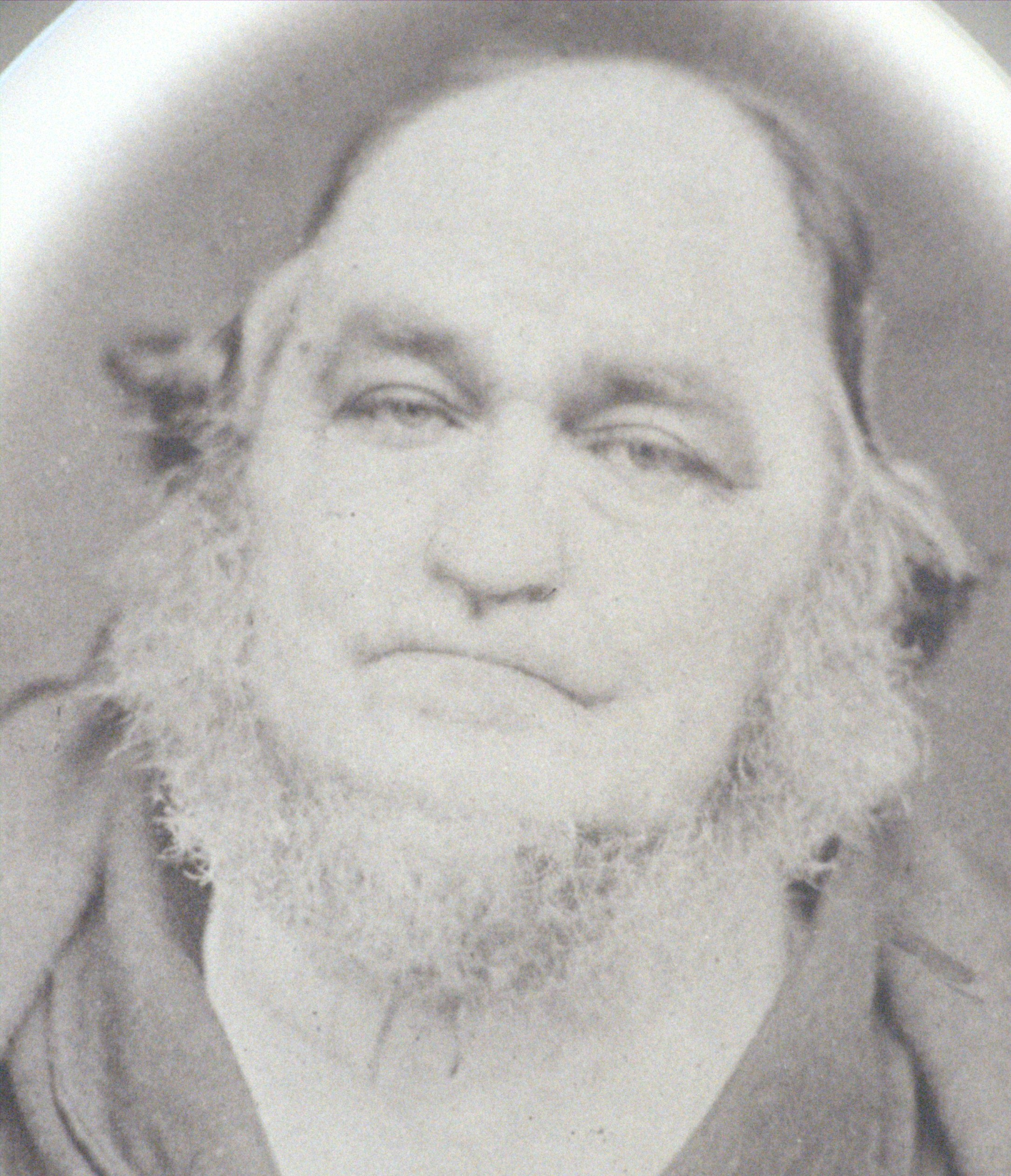
- John Franklin Moore, about 1870
- Born: John Franklin Moore; August 3, 1822; Iredell County, North Carolina
- Died: July 22, 1877 (aged 54); Iredell County, North Carolina
- Resting place: Willow Valley Cemetery, Mooresville, North Carolina
- Occupation(s): farmer, brick maker, developer
- Known for: namesake of Mooresville, North Carolina
- Spouse: Elizabeth Rachel (Summerow) Moore
- Children: 4
- Parents: James Moore (father); Esther (mother)

John Franklin Moore (August 3, 1822 – July 26, 1877) was visionary, pioneer citizen, and namesake of Mooresville, North Carolina.

== Early life ==
John Franklin Moore was born on August 3, 1822, in Iredell County, North Carolina. He was the son of James Moore (1775-before 1836) and Esther (Unknown) Moore. John had seven siblings. He married Elizabeth (Eliza) Rachel Summerow/Sumrow (1818-1900) in March 1846 in Iredell County. John is mentioned in his sister Jane Moore’s will in 1836 and his mother Esther Moore’s will written in 1845.

== Career ==
John was a small planter in Iredell County before 1856. The Western North Carolina Railroad was incorporated in 1855 and by 1856, the railroad tracks were placed on a natural ridge that crossed near the land of John Franklin Moore. Moore set up a depot on his land, and encouraged others to help establish a small village on the location in the late 1850s. The little village, known as Moore's Siding was born. The U.S. Civil War hampered developments, however, with the railroads track being removed to aid the Confederate efforts in Virginia. After the war, the tracks were returned, and Moore's Siding slowly began to prosper. Shortly after the Civil War, John Franklin Moore saw the need for the village to incorporate into a town. The town was incorporated as Mooresville in 1873. Mr. Moore also helped to establish the first brick making factory in Mooresville, and built some of the first brick buildings on Main Street in Mooresville.

John Moore died on July 22, 1877, and his wife, Rachel Summrow Moore, continued the development of the town.

== Additional references ==
- Commemorative Plaque, "John Franklin Moore, Mooresville"., Docsouth
- Sprague, Megan; "A Door to History"., Mooresville Tribune, August 16, 2015
