= J. R. Sweezy =

American football player (born 1989)

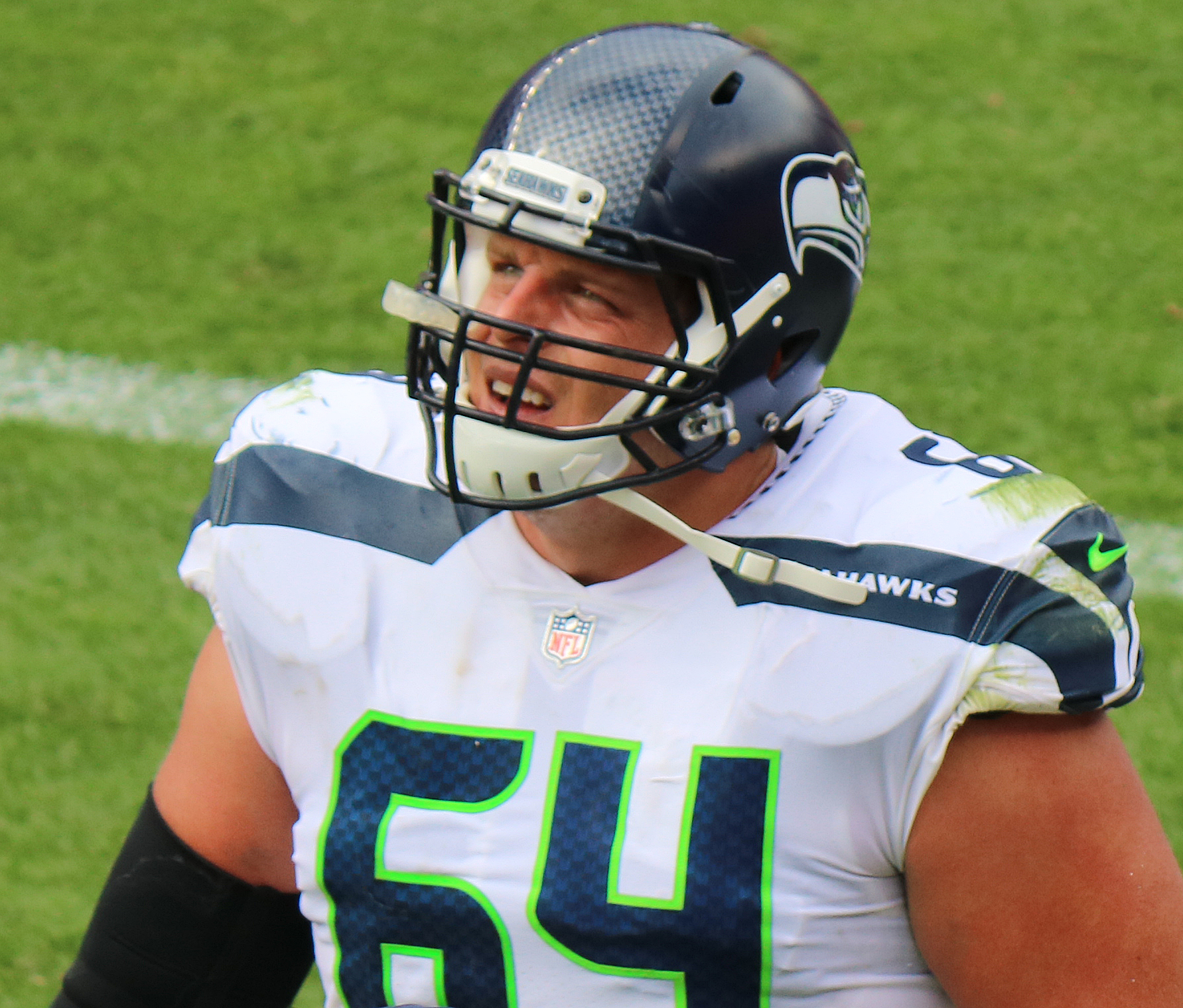
- Sweezy with the Seattle Seahawks in 2018

No. 64, 73, 63
- Position: Guard

Personal information
- Born: April 8, 1989 (age 37); Mooresville, North Carolina, U.S.
- Listed height: 6 ft 5 in (1.96 m)
- Listed weight: 310 lb (141 kg)

Career information
- High school: Mooresville
- College: NC State (2007–2011)
- NFL draft: 2012: 7th round, 225th overall pick

Career history
- Seattle Seahawks (2012–2015); Tampa Bay Buccaneers (2016–2017); Seattle Seahawks (2018); Arizona Cardinals (2019–2020); New Orleans Saints (2021)*
- * Offseason or practice squad member only

Awards and highlights
- Super Bowl champion (XLVIII)

Career NFL statistics
- Games played: 117
- Games started: 104
- Stats at Pro Football Reference

Justin Ross "J. R." Sweezy (born April 8, 1989) is an American former professional football player who was a guard in the National Football League (NFL). He was selected by the Seattle Seahawks in the seventh round, 225th overall, of the 2012 NFL draft. He played college football for the NC State Wolfpack.

== Early life ==
Sweezy was born in Mooresville, North Carolina, to Bryan and Susan Sweezy. He is the older brother of sister Madison Sweezy. Sweezy grew up a NC State Wolfpack fan, as his grandfather had previously played fullback for North Carolina State.

As a linebacker at Mooresville High School, his junior year, he recorded 115 tackles, eight tackles-for-loss, and three sacks. His senior year, he recorded 195 tackles, 14 tackles-for-loss, six sacks, and four forced fumbles in 12 games. He also wrestled in high school, winning the 2007 North Carolina 3A 285-pound state championship.

== College career ==
Sweezy played 35 games with 20 starts playing linebacker, defensive end, and defensive tackle at NC State, starting every game his junior and senior seasons. He recorded 86 tackles (65 solo), 22 tackles-for-loss, 11.0 sacks, 33 quarterback pressures, three passes defended, two forced fumbles and two fumble recoveries. He was voted team captain his senior season and was selected honorable mention All-ACC his junior year.

== Professional career ==
Pre-draft measurables
Height	Weight	Arm length	Hand span	40-yard dash	10-yard split	20-yard split	20-yard shuttle	Three-cone drill	Vertical jump	Broad jump	Bench press
6 ft 4 3/4 in (1.95 m)	298 lb (135 kg)	34 in (0.86 m)	9 5/8 in (0.24 m)	5.01 s	1.73 s	2.89 s	4.41 s	7.40 s	36 in (0.91 m)	9 ft 5 in (2.87 m)	21 reps
All values from NFL Combine

=== Seattle Seahawks (first stint) ===
Coming out of NC State, Sweezy wasn't a highly sought after draft prospect at defensive tackle. Seattle Seahawks' offensive line coach Tom Cable set up a private workout with Sweezy and evaluated his footwork and physical strength. Cable, who had successfully converted defensive lineman to offensive lineman throughout his career, thought Sweezy had the tools and ability to successfully transition to an NFL offensive lineman. After agreeing to switch to the offensive line the Seahawks drafted him in the seventh round of the 2012 NFL draft, reuniting him with former NC State teammate, Russell Wilson.

In his rookie season, Sweezy got the first start of his career in the season opener against the Arizona Cardinals replacing second year guard John Moffitt. He again started for the injured Moffitt in the last two games of the regular season against the San Francisco 49ers and St. Louis Rams. During the 2012 campaign he had three starts and played in 13 games. For the 2013 season Sweezy started 13 regular season games and in the post season for a Seahawks team that went on to win the Super Bowl that year. In 2014 Sweezy had his first season where he started every regular season game at right guard. The Seahawks would go on to return to the Super Bowl losing to the New England Patriots.

=== Tampa Bay Buccaneers ===
On March 9, 2016, Sweezy and the Tampa Bay Buccaneers agreed to a five-year deal worth $32.5 million. He underwent back surgery after signing with the Buccaneers and was placed on the Physically Unable to Perform list which made him unavailable for the first five games of the season. He was placed on injured reserve for the 2016 season on November 12 without appearing in a game for the Buccaneers.

Sweezy started the first 14 games of the 2017 season at right guard, playing every offensive snap before suffering an injury in Week 15. He was placed on injured reserve on December 20, 2017.

On June 29, 2018, Sweezy was released by the Buccaneers, just two seasons into his five-year deal.

=== Seattle Seahawks (second stint) ===
On August 1, 2018, Sweezy was re-signed by the Seahawks. He was a starter in all 15 games he played.

=== Arizona Cardinals ===
On March 15, 2019, Sweezy signed a two-year contract with the Arizona Cardinals. He started all 16 games at right guard for the Cardinals in 2019.

In 2020, Sweezy started the first five games at right guard before being placed on injured reserve on October 17, 2020, with an elbow injury. He was activated on November 14, 2020.

=== New Orleans Saints ===
On August 2, 2021, Sweezy signed with the New Orleans Saints. He was released on August 31, 2021.

=== Retirement ===
On July 27, 2022, Sweezy signed a one-day contract to officially retire as a member of the Seahawks.
