= Mooresville Graded School District =

School district in North Carolina, United States

Address
- 305 N Main St Mooresville, North Carolina; United States
- Coordinates: 35.5846°N 80.8092°W

District information
- Type: Public
- Motto: Every Child, Every Day
- Grades: K–12
- Established: 1905; 120 years ago
- Superintendent: Jason Gardner, Ed.D.
- NCES District ID: 3703120

Students and staff
- Enrollment: 5,993 (2020-2021)
- Faculty: 388.70 (on FTE basis)
- Student–teacher ratio: 15.42
- Athletic conference: Greater Metro 4A
- District mascot: Blue Devils
- Colors: Royal Blue and White

Other information
- Website: www.mgsd.k12.nc.us

The Mooresville Graded School District is a public school district located in Mooresville, North Carolina. It was established in 1905. The school district is notable for early adaption of an academically successful digital learning program which provides each student with a laptop computer and integrates its use into classroom instruction.

== Digital learning program ==
The school leases MacBook Air laptops from Apple and provides one to each student. Extremely low rates for broad-band service for low-income students have been negotiated. The program, which costs about $1,100,000 a year for lease fees and software, was financed by cutbacks in other areas such as increase in class size. A 10% layoff of teachers in 2009 and 2010 offered an opportunity for retirement of teachers who most strongly resisted the change to digital learning. Graduation and achievement have increased dramatically with the school ranked 3rd in North Carolina for achievement and 2nd in graduation rates.

== Demographics ==
Minorities make up 27% of Mooresville students are minorities with 40% eligible for free or reduced-price lunches. Success of the school's digital learning program has increased demand for real estate in the community.

== List of schools ==
- Park View Elementary (grades K-2)
  - Parkview elementary's mascot is a Patriot.
- South Elementary (grades K–2)
  - South Elementary's mascot is the Stars.
- Rocky River Elementary (grades K–2)
  - Rocky River Elementary's mascot is a Racer.
- East Mooresvlle Intermediate (Grades 3–5)
  - EMIS's mascot is an Eagle.
- Mooresville Intermediate (Grades 3–5)
  - MIS's mascot is a Bobcat.
- Mooresville Middle School (Grades 6-8)
  - MMS's mascot is a Red Imp.
- Selma Burke Middle School (Grades 6-8)
  - SBMS Mascot is a Bear.
- Mooresville High School (Grades 9–12)
  - MHS's mascot is the Blue Devil.
- N.F. Woods Technology & Art Center (part of MHS)

== Leadership ==
In 2013, Mooresville Graded School District's Superintendent, Dr. Mark Edwards, was named the American Association of School Administrator's National Superintendent of the Year.
