= Mark Canha =

American baseball player (born 1989)

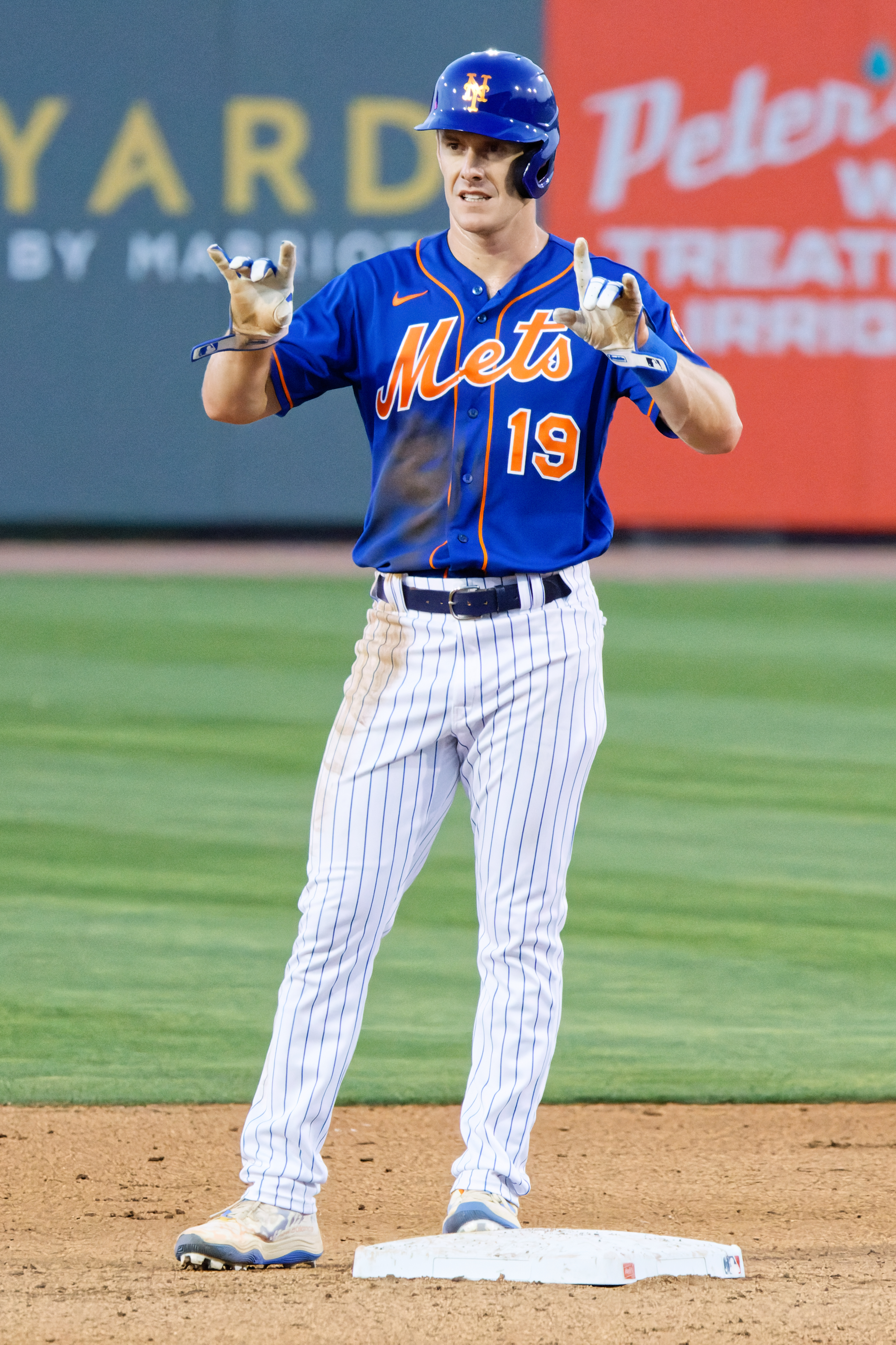
- Canha with the New York Mets in 2023

Free agent
- Outfielder / First baseman
- Born: February 15, 1989 (age 37); San Jose, California, U.S.
- Bats: Right Throws: Right

MLB debut
- April 8, 2015, for the Oakland Athletics

MLB statistics (through 2025 season)
- Batting average: .248
- Home runs: 121
- Runs batted in: 465
- Stats at Baseball Reference

Teams
- Oakland Athletics (2015–2021); New York Mets (2022–2023); Milwaukee Brewers (2023); Detroit Tigers (2024); San Francisco Giants (2024); Kansas City Royals (2025)

Mark David Canha (/ˈkænə/; born February 15, 1989) is an American professional baseball outfielder and first baseman who is a free agent. He has previously played in Major League Baseball (MLB) for the Oakland Athletics, New York Mets, Milwaukee Brewers, Detroit Tigers, San Francisco Giants, and Kansas City Royals. He made his MLB debut in 2015.

== Career ==
=== Amateur career ===
Canha attended Bellarmine College Preparatory in San Jose, California. In 2007, his senior year, he batted .440 with 11 home runs. After graduating from high school, he attended the University of California, Berkeley, where he played college baseball for the California Golden Bears. In 2008, he played summer league baseball for the St. Cloud River Bats of the Northwoods League. In summer 2009, he played with the Brewster Whitecaps of the Cape Cod Baseball League. In 2010, his junior season, he hit .319 with 10 home runs and 69 runs batted in (RBI) in 54 games.

=== Florida / Miami Marlins ===
The Florida Marlins selected Canha in the seventh round, with the 227th overall selection, of the 2010 Major League Baseball draft. He split his first professional season between the rookie-level Gulf Coast League Marlins and Low-A Jamestown Jammers, hitting .243 with four home runs and 10 RBI across 20 games. Canha spent the 2011 season with the Single-A Greensboro Grasshoppers, playing in 107 games and batting .276/.374/.529 with 25 home runs, 85 RBI, and seven stolen bases.

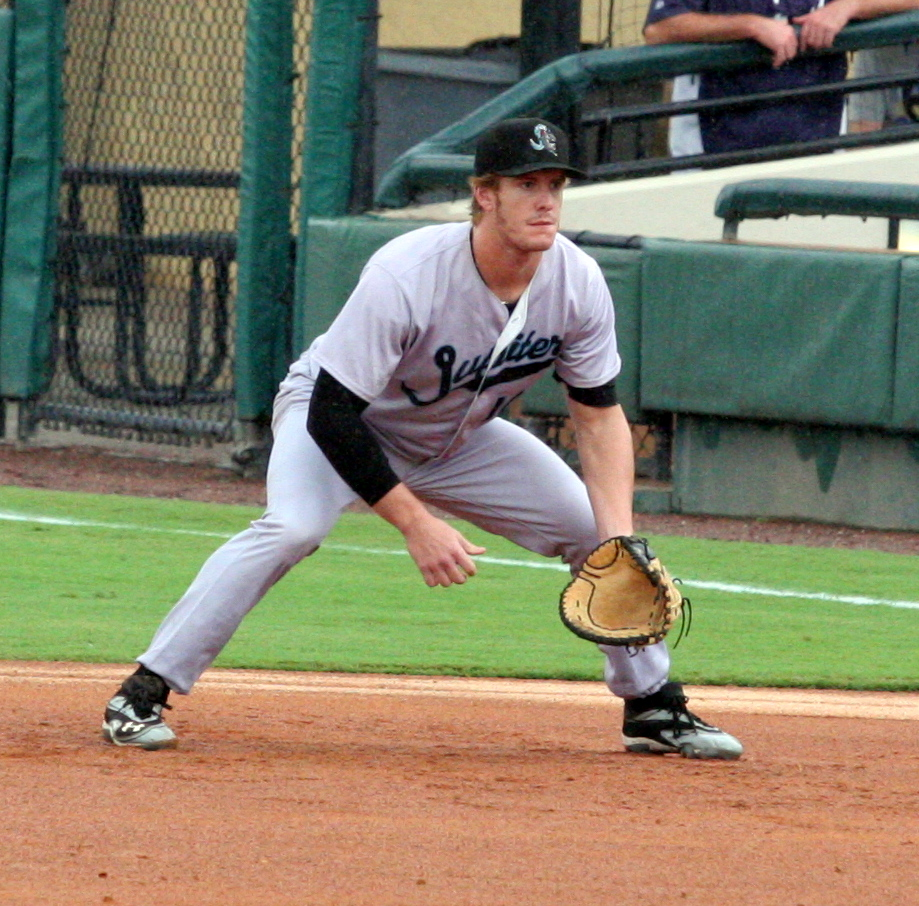
Canha with the Jupiter Hammerheads in 2012

Canha made 114 appearances for the High-A Jupiter Hammerheads in 2012, slashing .293/.382/.411 with six home runs and 68 RBI. He spent the 2013 campaign with the Double-A Jacksonville Suns, playing in 128 games and batting .273/.371/.449 with 13 home runs and 58 RBI. In 2014, Canha played for the New Orleans Zephyrs of the Triple-A Pacific Coast League (PCL). In 127 appearances, he slashed .303/.384/.505 with 20 home runs and 82 RBI.

=== Oakland Athletics ===
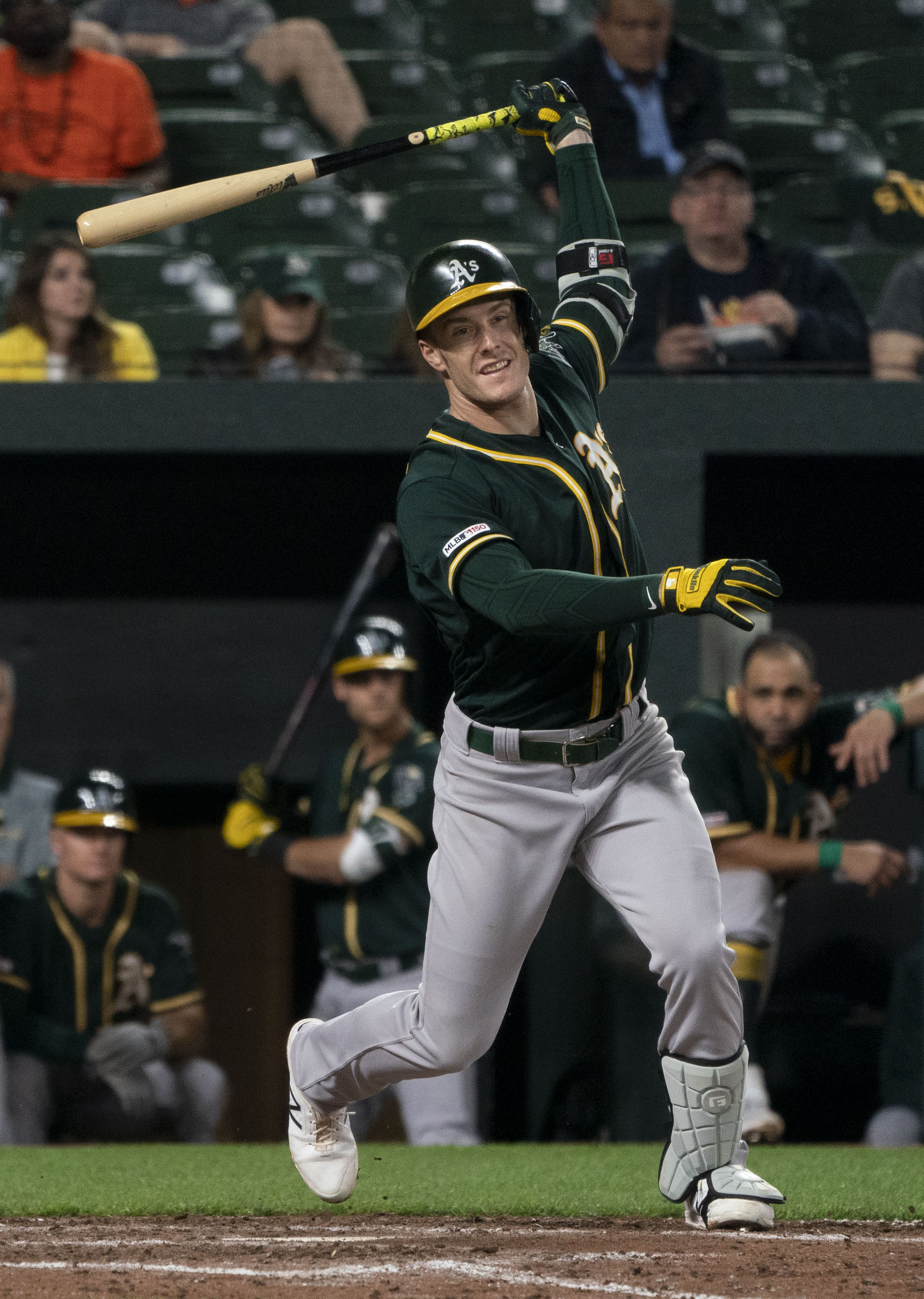
Canha with the Athletics in 2019

On December 11, 2014, the Colorado Rockies chose Canha in the Rule 5 draft from the Marlins, and then traded him to the Oakland Athletics for pitcher Austin House. During spring training in 2015, Canha led the Athletics in home runs but also led all major league players in strikeouts. Due to the team's need for a power hitter following the offseason trades of Josh Donaldson and Brandon Moss, Canha made the Athletics' Opening Day roster. In his major league debut, on April 8, Canha had three hits and four RBI. He remained with the Athletics throughout the 2015 season and led all American League rookies in RBIs. He finished the season with 16 home runs and 70 RBIs, playing primarily at first base and left field.

Canha underwent season-ending hip surgery after only 16 games with Oakland in 2016. Returning in 2017, he played six games with the A's before being optioned to the Nashville Sounds of the PCL on April 15. On November 8, 2017, Canha underwent right wrist surgery to remove a cyst.

In 2018, Canha hit a career-high 17 home runs with 52 RBIs and a .249/.328/.449 batting line. In 2019, he set career highs in average (.273), home runs (26), runs (80) and walks (67) in 126 games. In 2020, Canha slashed .246/.387/.408 with 5 home runs and 33 RBIs in 191 at-bats for the club.

On May 2, 2021, Canha was hit by a pitch for the 60th time in his career, most all-time in the Oakland history of the Athletics franchise. In 2021, he tied for the major league lead in hit by pitches, with 27. After the season, Canha became a free agent after the Athletics did not make an $18.4 million qualifying offer.

=== New York Mets ===
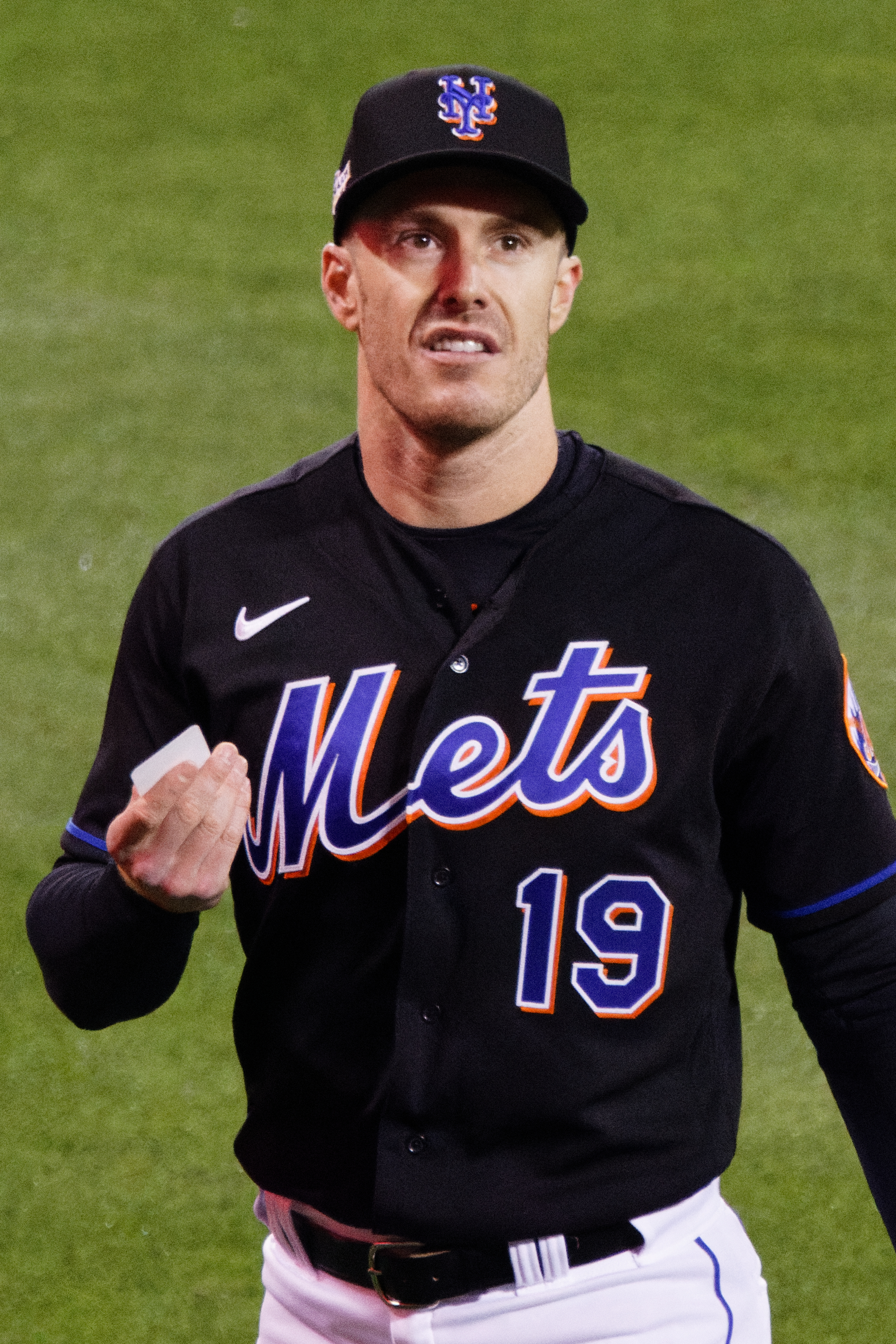
Canha with the Mets in 2022

On November 30, 2021, Canha signed a two-year, $26.5 million contract with the New York Mets including an option for a third year. Canha said he signed with the Mets because he "was ready for the big stage and New York's a big stage" and he wanted "to show the world what [he] can do."

On April 15, 2022, Canha was placed on the COVID-19 injured list. He returned five days later on April 20. On August 30, Canha hit the 100th home run of his career off of Andrew Heaney of the Los Angeles Dodgers. On September 10, he hit his first career grand slam off of Andrew Nardi of the Miami Marlins. In 2022, Canha led the majors in hit by pitch (28), and batted .266/.367/.403 with 13 home runs and 61 RBI in 140 games. Across 89 games for the Mets in 2023, he batted .245/.343/.381 with 6 home runs and 29 RBI.

=== Milwaukee Brewers ===
On July 31, 2023, the Mets traded Canha to the Milwaukee Brewers for pitcher Justin Jarvis. In 50 games for the Brewers, Canha slashed .287/.373/.427 with five home runs, 33 RBI, and four stolen bases.

=== Detroit Tigers ===
On November 4, 2023, the Brewers traded Canha to the Detroit Tigers for pitcher Blake Holub. Across 93 games for Detroit, Canha batted .231/.337/.350 with 7 home runs, 38 RBI, and 4 stolen bases.

=== San Francisco Giants ===
On July 30, 2024, the Tigers traded Canha to the San Francisco Giants for pitcher Eric Silva. Across 32 games for the Giants, Canha batted .288/.376/.329 with no home runs and 4 RBI. He became a free agent after the season.

=== Kansas City Royals ===
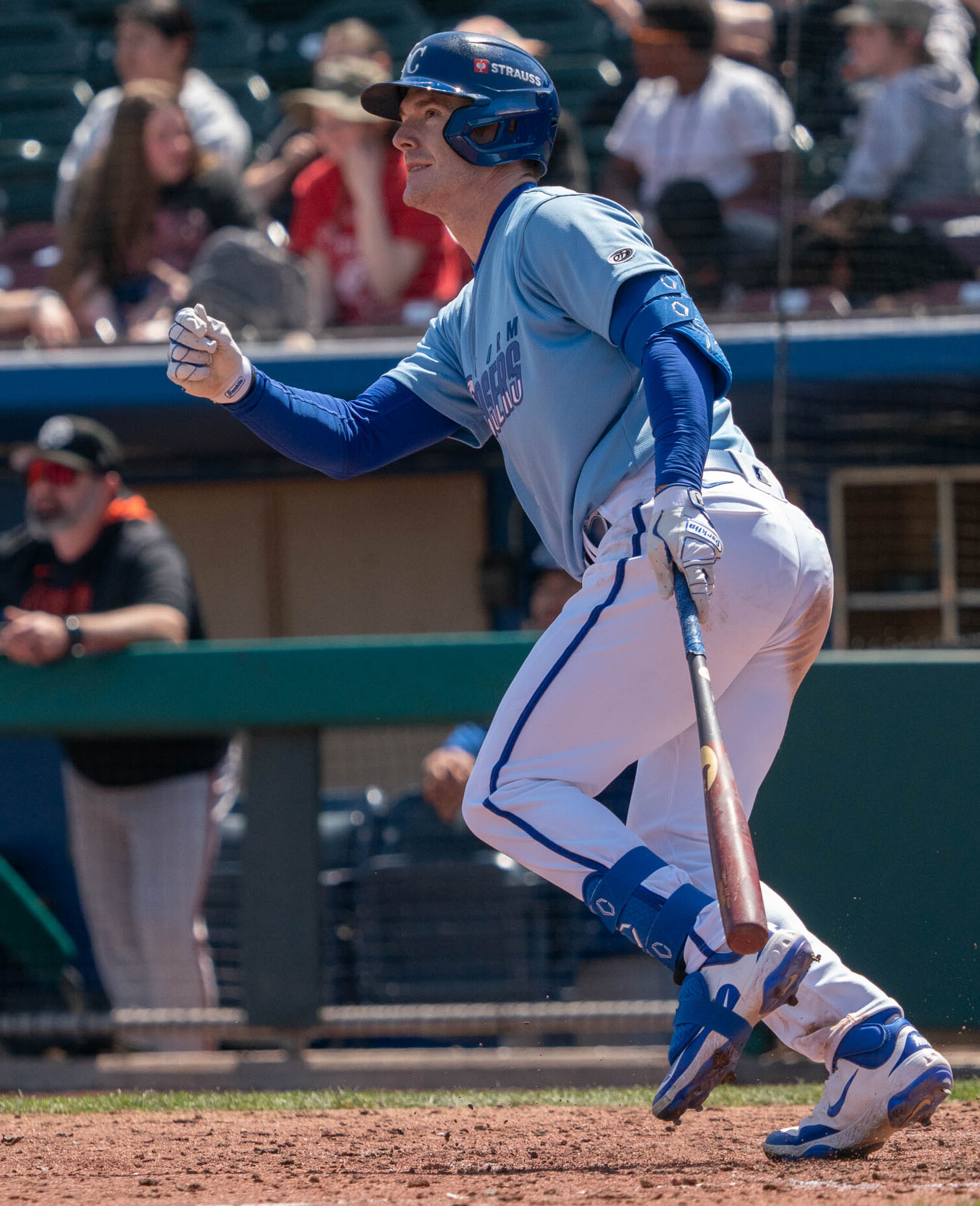
Canha in 2025

On February 22, 2025, Canha signed a minor league contract with the Milwaukee Brewers. On March 21, the Brewers traded Canha to the Kansas City Royals for pitcher Cesar Espinal. Canha was added to the Royals' 40-man roster three days later. On April 8, Canha left a game against the Minnesota Twins early after running into the left field wall at Kauffman Stadium, resulting in a stint on the injured list. He returned to the Royals on April 20 and plated his first RBI of the season that night, in a ten-inning win over the Detroit Tigers. In 46 appearances for Kansas City, Canha slashed .212/.272/.265 with one home run and six RBI. Canha was designated for assignment by the Royals on August 18. He was released by Kansas City after clearing waivers on August 21.

=== Texas Rangers ===
On February 15, 2026, Canha signed a minor league contract with the Texas Rangers. He did not make an appearance for the organization, and was released by the Rangers upon his request on April 16.

== Personal life ==
Canha's wife, Marci, is an architect who is also originally from San Jose. Canha is of Portuguese heritage.

Canha is a foodie; he loves trying new places and new types of food. Canha has described himself as a liberal and a supporter of LGBTQ rights. In May 2026, Canha made an appearance as a contestant on the Food Network show, 100 cooks.

== See also ==
- Rule 5 draft results
