= Espy Watts Brawley House =

Historic house in North Carolina, United States

- U.S. National Register of Historic Places
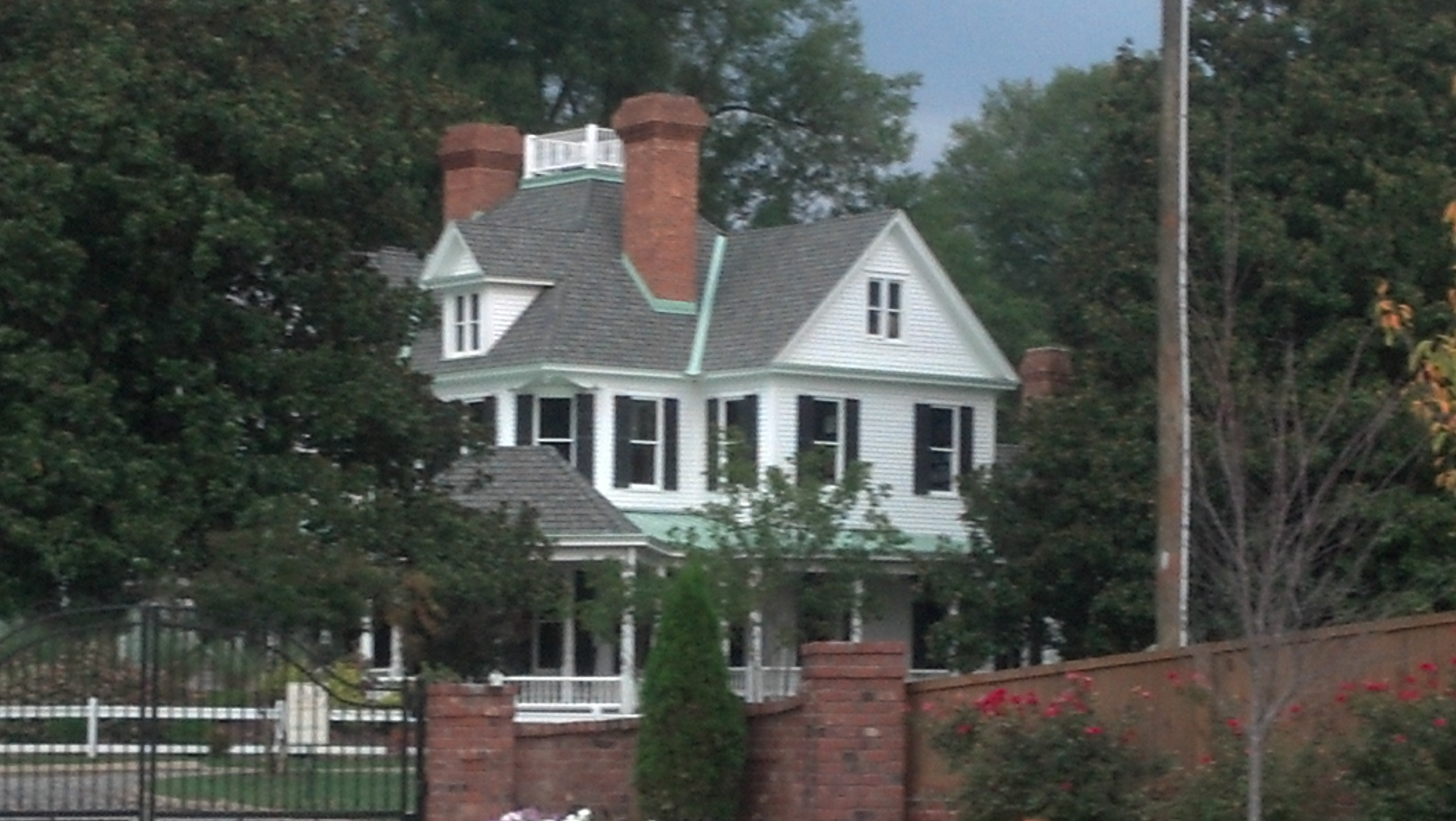
- A view of the Brawley House from N.C. Highway 115

- Location within North Carolina Location within the United States
- Location: 601 William St., Mooresville, North Carolina
- Coordinates: 35°35′55″N 80°48′29″W
- Built: 1904
- Architectural style: Colonial Revival; Queen Anne style
- MPS: Iredell County MRA
- NRHP reference No.: 80002859
- Added to NRHP: November 24, 1980

The Espy Watts Brawley House, also known as the Brawley House, is a historic home located at Mooresville, Iredell County, North Carolina. It was built in 1904, and is a large 2 1/2-story, transitional Queen Anne / Colonial Revival style frame dwelling. It has a two-story side wing with a two-story, three-sided bay; truncated slate hipped roof; and one-story wraparound porch with porte-cochère. Also on the property are two contributing outbuildings.

It is currently used as a venue for weddings and other events. The house's namesake, Espy Watts Brawley, was a prominent local cotton farmer, cottonseed oil manufacturer, and banker.

It was listed on the National Register of Historic Places in 1980.
