= Mount Calvary Lutheran Church =

Historic church in Virginia, United States

- U.S. National Register of Historic Places
- Virginia Landmarks Register
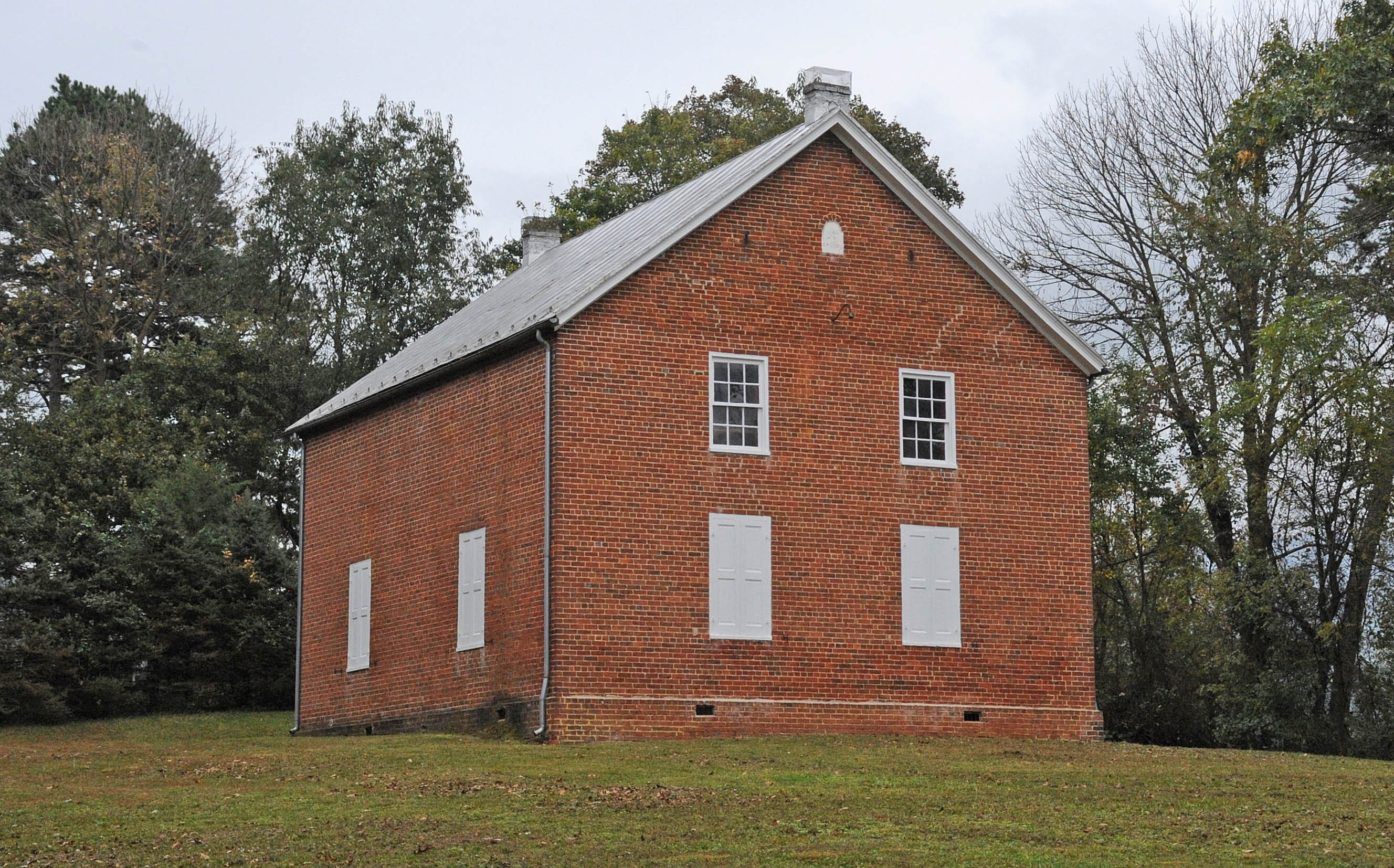

- Location within Virginia Location within the United States
- Location: 279 Somers Rd., Luray, Virginia
- Coordinates: 38°37′48″N 78°25′23″W
- Area: 4 acres (1.6 ha)
- Built: 1848
- Architectural style: Early Republic, Federal
- NRHP reference No.: 98001068
- VLR No.: 069-0038

Significant dates
- Added to NRHP: June 3, 2008
- Designated VLR: June 17, 1998

Mount Calvary Lutheran Church, also known as Hawksbill Church, Hacksbill Church, Hoxbiehl Church, and Gomer's Church, is an historic Lutheran church with adjacent cemetery located near the town of Luray in Page County, Virginia, United States.

== History ==
It is not known when this congregation was established. In 1765, John Schwarbach, who apparently was temporarily rendering pastoral services, conveyed three acres (1.2 ha) of land to Peter Painter and Jacob Shaffer, trustees of this church. The church was first called the “Hoxbiehl” or “Hacksbill” (Hawksbill), later “Comer’s Church” due to so many members by that name, and lastly “Mount Calvary.” This church was first served by the Pennsylvania Ministerium, Bathaser Sauer having attended a convention as a lay delegate. In 1813, it was one of the five valley churches to unite with the Evangelical Lutheran North Carolina Synod, and in 1820 it joined the Evangelical Lutheran Tennessee Synod.

Mount Calvary was originally a union church shared by members of the Lutheran and Reformed faiths. The insistence on conducting all church functions in the German language led to the cancellation of the union agreement in 1832, when the Reformed people formed a separate congregation.

The church served an active congregation until 1959, when regular services ceased.

Mount Calvary was the mother church of five other congregations in Page County that were organized, directly or indirectly, from her membership: Morning Star (organized 29 November 1873), Grace (organized 10 March 1877), St. Mark’s (organized 1876), St. James’ (Rileyville, organized 1884), and Beth Eden (organized 31 December 1896).

== Pastors ==
The following pastors have served Mount Calvary Church.

- Johannes Schwarbach 1765-1775

Besides pastors from Madison County, Virginia, Peter Muhlenberg and Christian Streit rendered occasional pastoral services.

- Paul Henkel 1784-1823
- James Hoffman (Reformed) 1796-1806
- Wilhelm G. Forster 1798-1806
- Johann Voltz (John Foltz) 1806-1810
- Peter Schmucker 1813-1820
- Paul Henkel 1821-1822
- George Leidy (Reformed) 1822-1823
- Ambrose Henkel 1823-1837
- Jacob Stirewalt 1837-1860
- Socrates Henkel 1860-1869
- John Nathaniel Stirewalt 1869-1906
- D.L. Miller 1907-1909 (His call was to the Stony Man pastorate)
- Philip Loy Snapp 1910–1921 (His call was to the Stony Man pastorate)
- Carroll Irving Morgan 1921-1925
- Abner Lafayette Boliek 1927-1933
- B.D. Castor 1934-1944
- H.B. Arehart 1945-1954
- R.H. Ebert 1956-1959

== Church buildings ==
It is not known in what year a church was first built on this site. However, on August 6, 1765, Johannes Schwarbach, who apparently was temporarily rendering pastoral services, conveyed three acres (1.2 ha) of land to Peter Painter and Jacob Shaffer, trustees of the church.

The old log church stood in front of and to the right of the present building. In 1937, one could still see where the ground had been disturbed for the foundation. It was rectangular in shape, with two front entrances. It was used not only as a church, but also as a school. Near the old church and on the lower side of the. graveyard was a two-story log building that was also used as a school.

The current structure is the third church at the location, and was constructed in 1848. The building is a two-story rectangular brick structure with a metal gable roof. Since its construction, the church has seen no additions and only minor alterations to the interior and exterior of the building. The site includes a small cemetery and a non-contributing wooden outhouse. As of 2008, the church was undergoing restoration with the possibility of using the building again.

The church was listed on the Virginia Landmarks Register on June 17, 1998, and the National Register of Historic Places on June 3, 2008.

== Church register ==
The only existing church register for Mount Calvary was acquired in 1817. The early entries are in German. The register is 32 centimetres (13 in) long and about 19 centimetres (7.5 in) wide. The book is in two parts and has two title pages. In 1979, the book was in the possession of Harry L. Comer of Page County, Virginia. There are at least two English translations of its pages:

- Finck, William J., translator. Early Records of Mt. Calvary Lutheran Church, Page County, Virginia. St. Louis: Joseph Willard Baker, October 10, 1969.
- Wust, Klaus, translator. The Record of Hawksbill Church 1788-1850 Page County, VA. Edinburg, Virginia: Shenandoah History, 1979.

Tradition says that an earlier church register was lost in the Civil War.
