= Mooresville High School (North Carolina) =

American public school in North Carolina

Location
- 659 E Center Ave; Mooresville, North Carolina; United States; 35°34′40″N 80°48′06″W

Information
- Type: Public
- Motto: “Every Child, Every Day”
- Established: 1930s
- School district: Mooresville Graded School District
- CEEB code: 342715
- NCES School ID: 370312001333
- Principal: Samone Graham
- Faculty: 81 (FTE) (2015–16)
- Enrollment: 2,045 students (2023–24)
- Colors: Blue, white, black
- Athletics: NCHSAA 7A
- Athletics conference: North Piedmont 6A/7A
- Mascot: Blue Devils
- Accreditation: AdvancED
- Website: mhs.mgsd.k12.nc.us

Mooresville Senior High School, or more commonly Mooresville High School, is a high school located in Mooresville, North Carolina. It is part of the Mooresville Graded School District and was opened in the 1930s. The sports teams are known as the Blue Devils. Mooresville plays in the North Piedmont Conference 6A/7A which includes Mooresville (7A); Davie Co (7A); South Iredell (7A); Lake Norman (7A); Statesville (6A); North Iredell (6A). Mooresville Home is Coach Joe Popp Stadium located on the Magnolia Campus of Mooresville High School.

== School information ==
For the 2024-2025 school year, Mooresville High School had a total enrollment of 1953 students and 82 teachers on a (FTE) basis. The student population had a gender ratio of 50.25% male to 49.75% female. The demographic group makeup of the student population was: White, 75.35%; Black, 16.46%; Hispanic, 4.73%; Asian/Pacific Islander, 1.89%; and American Indian, 0.13% (two or more races, 1.45%). For the same school year, 31.84% of the students received free and reduced-cost lunches.

== Notable alumni ==
- Rodney Childers, NASCAR Cup Series championship winning crew chief
- Dale Earnhardt Jr., retired NASCAR Cup Series driver, member of the NASCAR Hall of Fame
- Jeffrey Earnhardt, NASCAR Xfinity Series driver
- Justin Jarvis, baseball player in the New York Mets organization
- John J. Mack, senior advisor to the investment firm Kohlberg Kravis Roberts and the former CEO & chairman of the board at Morgan Stanley
- Jim Popp, sports executive
- J.R. Sweezy, NFL offensive guard, Super Bowl XLVIII champion with the Seattle Seahawks
- Forrest Thompson, MLB pitcher
