= Mooresville, North Carolina =

- Town
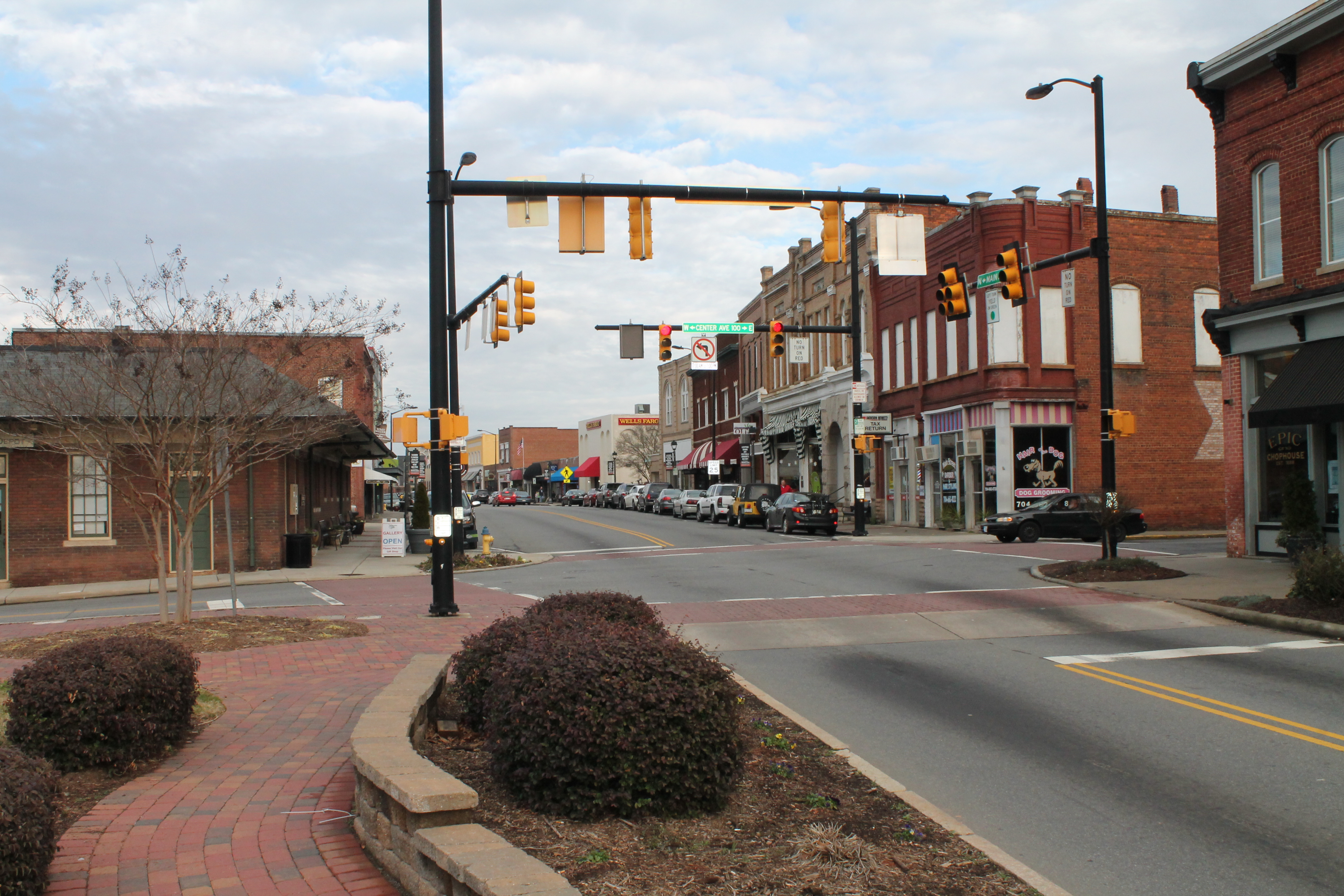
- Main Street

- Flag Seal Logo
- Nickname: Race City USA
- Interactive map of Mooresville
- Coordinates: 35°35′05″N 80°49′36″W
- Country: United States
- State: North Carolina
- County: Iredell
- Established: March 3, 1873
- Named for: John Franklin Moore

Government
  - Type: Council-Manager government
  - Mayor: Eddie Dingler (mayor pro tem)
  - Town Manager: Tracey Jerome
  - Town Commission: Eddie Dingler (Ward 1); William Aven (Ward 2); Tommy DeWeese (Ward 3); Lisa Qualls (Ward 4); Eddie Karriker (At Large); Gary West (At Large)

Area
  - Total: 26.58 sq mi (68.84 km^{2})
  - Land: 26.51 sq mi (68.66 km^{2})
  - Water: 0.066 sq mi (0.17 km^{2})
- Elevation: 840 ft (260 m)

Population (2020)
  - Total: 50,193
  - Estimate (2022): 52,656
  - Density: 1,890/sq mi (731/km^{2})
- Time zone: UTC−5 (Eastern (EST))
  - Summer (DST): UTC−4 (EDT)
- ZIP codes: 28115, 28117
- Area codes: 704, 980
- FIPS code: 37-44220
- GNIS feature ID: 2406189
- Website: www.mooresvillenc.gov

Mooresville is a town located in the southwestern section of Iredell County, North Carolina, United States, and is a part of the Charlotte metropolitan area. The population was 50,193 at the 2020 census, making it the most populous municipality in Iredell County. It is located approximately 25 miles (40 km) north of Charlotte.

Mooresville is best known as the home of many NASCAR racing teams and drivers, along with an IndyCar team and its drivers, as well as racing technology suppliers, which has earned the town the nickname "Race City USA". Also located in Mooresville is the corporate headquarters of Lowe's Corporation and Universal Technical Institute's NASCAR Technical Institute.

== History ==
The area that would develop into the town of Mooresville was originally settled by English, German, and Scots-Irish families who moved into the area from nearby Rowan County, as well as from Virginia, Pennsylvania, and elsewhere. Many were seeking new lands on which to establish farms. Many of the early families such as the Wilsons, Davidsons, Cowans, Sherrills, Torrances, and others came to the area as early as the mid-1700s. They formed small communities that eventually grew into the community known as "Deep Well", which took its name from a large natural well that was found in the area.

Many of these families established large farms, primarily of cotton, which grew into small plantations by the 1850s. Major Rufus Reid was the most prominent planter in the area, enslaving 81 African Americans on over 2,000 acres (810 ha) of land. His property was known as Mount Mourne Plantation, named after the Mourne Mountains of County Down in Northern Ireland. Several other historic plantation homes are set in the area as well, including the Johnson-Neel House, the Cornelius House, Forest Dell Plantation, and the colonial era Belmont Plantation.

In 1856, a railroad was placed on a ridge that crossed the land of a local farmer by the name of John Franklin Moore. A small-scale planter, Moore set up a depot on his land, and encouraged others to help establish a small village on the location in the late 1850s. The little village, known as "Moore's Siding", was born. The Civil War hampered developments, with the railroad tracks being removed to aid the Confederate efforts in Virginia. After the war, the tracks were returned, and Moore's Siding slowly began to prosper.

Shortly after the Civil War, John Franklin Moore saw the need for the village to incorporate into a town. The town was incorporated as Mooresville in 1873. Moore helped to establish the first brick factory in Mooresville, and built some of the first brick buildings on Main Street. He died in 1877, and his wife, Rachel Summrow Moore, continued the development of the town.

In 1883 the railroad lines were run back through the town with the addition of a new depot. The railroad brought growth to the town, which continued with the addition of the first water plant in the early 1890s, the establishment of a library in 1899, a phone company in 1893 and the first of many textile mills in 1900.

In 1938, artist Alicia Weincek painted the mural North Carolina Cotton Industry in the town's post office, having won a WPA competition for the commissioned work.

The Mooresville Moors were a minor league baseball team who played in the Class D North Carolina State League from 1937 to 1942. The league ceased operations for two seasons due to World War II but was reorganized in 1945.

Selma Burke, a prominent sculptor during the Harlem Renaissance who was born and raised in Mooresville, created the bust of President Franklin D. Roosevelt for the Four Freedoms plaque on the Recorder of Deeds building in Washington, D.C. The bust would later be used for the image on the United States dime.

On December 11, 2014, Duke Energy, to repair a rusted, leaking pipe, received approval from North Carolina to dump coal ash (containing arsenic, lead, thallium and mercury, among other heavy metals) from the Marshall Steam Station 10 miles (16 km) west of Mooresville into Lake Norman.

On October 3, 2015, Duke reported that a sinkhole had formed at the base of the Marshall Steam Station dam on Lake Norman. The Department of Environmental Quality (DEQ) says Duke placed a liner in the hole and filled it with crushed stone.

== Geography ==
Mooresville is located in southern Iredell County. Interstate 77 passes through the western side of the town, with access from Exits 31 through 36. I-77 leads south to the South Carolina border and north to the Virginia line. Statesville, just to the north, is the county seat. Lake Norman, on the Catawba River, is 3 to 8 miles (5 to 13 km) west of the town center. Mooresville is located 27 miles (43 km) north of Charlotte and 16 miles (26 km) south of Statesville.

According to the United States Census Bureau, Mooresville has a total area of 21.0 square miles (54.3 km^{2}), of which 20.9 square miles (54.2 km^{2}) are land and 0.04 square miles (0.1 km^{2}), or 0.24%, are water.

== Demographics ==
Historical population
Census	Pop.	Note	%±
1880	508		—
1890	886		74.4%
1900	1,533		73.0%
1910	3,400		121.8%
1920	4,315		26.9%
1930	5,619		30.2%
1940	6,682		18.9%
1950	7,121		6.6%
1960	6,918		−2.9%
1970	8,808		27.3%
1980	8,575		−2.6%
1990	9,317		8.7%
2000	18,823		102.0%
2010	32,711		73.8%
2020	50,193		53.4%
2025 (est.)	55,842	▲	11.3%
U.S. Decennial Census

=== 2020 census ===
As of the 2020 census, Mooresville had a population of 50,193. The median age was 36.2 years. 25.6% of residents were under the age of 18 and 12.6% of residents were 65 years of age or older. For every 100 females there were 93.8 males, and for every 100 females age 18 and over there were 90.4 males age 18 and over.

99.7% of residents lived in urban areas, while 0.3% lived in rural areas.

There were 19,441 households in Mooresville, of which 37.1% had children under the age of 18 living in them. Of all households, 48.5% were married-couple households, 17.6% were households with a male householder and no spouse or partner present, and 27.1% were households with a female householder and no spouse or partner present. About 26.7% of all households were made up of individuals and 8.6% had someone living alone who was 65 years of age or older. There were 9,866 families residing in the town. There were 20,842 housing units, of which 6.7% were vacant. The homeowner vacancy rate was 1.6% and the rental vacancy rate was 8.4%.

Mooresville racial composition
Race	Number	Percentage
White (non-Hispanic)	35,046	69.82%
Black or African American (non-Hispanic)	5,462	10.88%
Native American	119	0.24%
Asian	2,606	5.19%
Pacific Islander	23	0.05%
Other/Mixed	2,525	5.03%
Hispanic or Latino	4,412	8.79%

=== 2000 census ===
In the 2000 census, there were 18,823 people, 7,139 households, and 5,082 families residing in the town. The population density was 1,281.6 inhabitants per square mile (494.8/km^{2}). There were 7,741 housing units at an average density of 527.1 per square mile (203.5/km^{2}). The racial makeup of the town was 81.54% White, 14.23% African American, 0.36% Native American, 1.66% Asian, 0.02% Pacific Islander, 1.14% from other races, and 1.06% from two or more races. Hispanic or Latino of any race were 2.55% of the population.

There were 7,139 households, out of which 39.1% had children under the age of 18 living with them, 54.9% were married couples living together, 12.7% had a female householder with no husband present, and 28.8% were non-families. 24.0% of all households were made up of individuals, and 8.1% had someone living alone who was 65 years of age or older. The average household size was 2.58 and the average family size was 3.09.

In the town, the population was spread out, with 28.7% under the age of 18, 7.3% from 18 to 24, 34.3% from 25 to 44, 18.4% from 45 to 64, and 11.2% who were 65 years of age or older. The median age was 34 years. For every 100 females, there were 93.4 males. For every 100 females age 18 and over, there were 88.8 males.

The median income for a household in the town was $42,943, and the median income for a family was $51,011. Males had a median income of $39,524 versus $24,939 for females. The per capita income for the town was $20,549. About 5.6% of families and 7.2% of the population were below the poverty line, including 7.5% of those under age 18 and 12.3% of those age 65 or over.

== Arts and culture ==
Mooresville is branded as "Race City USA". The town is home to more than 60 NASCAR teams and racing-related businesses, as well as an IndyCar team. Mooresville features two automotive museums: the Memory Lane Motorsports and Historical Automotive Museum, and the North Carolina Auto Racing Hall of Fame. The Mooresville Convention & Visitors Bureau is the official resource for travelers.

=== Historic districts ===
In addition to a number of historic sites including Mount Mourne Plantation, Johnson-Neel House, Cornelius House, and Espy Watts Brawley House, Mooresville is home to the following historic districts listed on the National Register of Historic Places:

- Mooresville Historic District, which includes much of the downtown commercial district;
- Mooresville Mill Village Historic District, a residential area near the former mill site; and
- South Broad Street Row, a district of older homes, some now in commercial use, near downtown.

== Government ==
The Town of Mooresville is run in a Commission-Manager style of municipal government with the Town Manager being Tracey Jerome. The Mooresville Board of Commissioners is presided over by Mayor Chris Carney and can be presided over by Mayor Pro Tempore and Ward 1 Commissioner Eddie Dingler in the event of Carney’s absence.

== Education ==
=== Public schools ===
Schools located in Mooresville operated by Mooresville Graded School District include:

- East Mooresville Intermediate School
- Mooresville High School
- Mooresville Intermediate
- Mooresville Middle
- Park View Elementary
- Rocky River Elementary
- Selma Burke Middle
- South Elementary

Schools located in Mooresville operated by Iredell-Statesville Schools include:

- Coddle Creek Elementary
- Lake Norman Elementary
- Lakeshore Elementary
- Shepherd Elementary
- Woodland Heights Elementary

=== Charter schools ===
- Pine Lake Preparatory School (Charter School)
- Langtree Charter School

=== Community college ===
Mooresville is the location of a campus of Mitchell Community College, whose main campus is in Statesville.

== Infrastructure ==
=== Transportation and highways ===
The following highways pass through or around Mooresville:

- I-77 - passes through the western side of Mooresville.
- US 21 - passes through the western side of Mooresville, running parallel to I-77 approximately one mile east of I-77
- NC 3 - passes through downtown Mooresville. The number is in recognition of the late NASCAR driver Dale Earnhardt, whose car number was 3.
- NC 115 - passes through downtown Mooresville
- NC 150 - passes through the northern side of Mooresville
- NC 152 - passes through downtown Mooresville
- NC 801 - passes through the northeastern side of Mooresville

Exit 36 from Interstate 77 provides access to NC 150 and downtown Mooresville. Exits 33 and 42 from Interstate 77 provide access to US 21, while Exit 42 also connects with NC 115. Exits 31 (Langtree Road) and 35 (Brawley School Road) also connect I-77 with Mooresville.

The I-77 Express Lanes begin at Exit 36, and continue south through the Mecklenburg County towns of Davidson, Cornelius and Huntersville before terminating in Uptown Charlotte.

=== Lake Norman Airpark ===
Lake Norman Airpark is located on the edge of Lake Norman and is 5 miles (8.0 km) northwest of downtown Mooresville, offering a 3,100-foot (940 m) runway. A thriving "fly-in community", Lake Norman Airpark is home to almost 50 lots. Tie-downs and fuel are available. The airport is owned by the surrounding Lake Norman Airpark Owners Association.

=== Media ===
First 3 seasons of the show Banshee were filmed in the town. Scenes from the Netflix show Hunting Wives were also filmed in the town.

== Notable people ==
- Greg Anderson, four-time NHRA pro stock champion
- Greg Biffle, NASCAR driver (1969–2025)
- Ryan Blaney, NASCAR driver
- Nicole Briscoe, ESPN host
- Ryan Briscoe, INDYCAR driver
- Selma Burke, sculptor/artist
- Kurt Busch, NASCAR driver
- Kyle Busch, NASCAR driver (1985-2026)
- Dale Earnhardt, NASCAR driver, member of the NASCAR Hall of Fame(1951-2001)
- Dale Earnhardt Jr., NASCAR driver, member of the NASCAR Hall of Fame
- Jeffrey Earnhardt, NASCAR driver
- Kerry Earnhardt, NASCAR driver
- Chase Elliott, NASCAR driver
- Suellen Evans, college student and murder victim
- Shane van Gisbergen, NASCAR Driver
- Jeff Gordon, retired NASCAR driver
- Matt Gould, racing driver
- Tanner Gray, NHRA pro stock driver and NASCAR driver
- Hayes Grier, social media personality
- Nash Grier, social media personality
- Will Grier, NFL quarterback
- Dan Jansen, retired speed skater
- Michael Jordan, basketball legend's NASCAR team, 23XI Racing, has its base in Mooresville.
- Kasey Kahne, NASCAR driver
- Joel Kauffman, NASCAR driver
- Brad Keselowski, NASCAR driver
- David Levine, ARCA and NASCAR driver
- Jason Line, three-time NHRA pro stock champion, 1993 NHRA Stock Eliminator Champion
- Joey Logano, NASCAR driver
- John J. Mack, investment banker
- Olindo Mare, NFL kicker
- J.B. Mauney, former professional bull rider
- Scott McLaughlin, INDYCAR driver
- Jack Melchor, venture capitalist
- John Franklin Moore (1822–1877), pioneer citizen and founder of Mooresville, North Carolina
- Melissa Morrison-Howard, track hurler, two-time Olympic bronze medalist
- Joe Nemechek, NASCAR driver
- John Hunter Nemechek, NASCAR driver and son of Joe Nemechek
- Thomas O'Keefe, musician
- Julius Peppers, NFL defensive end, formerly of the Carolina Panthers, Chicago Bears and Green Bay Packers
- Jim Popp, General Manager 5-time Grey Cup Champion Canadian Football League
- Will Power, INDYCAR driver
- Riki Rachtman, MTV TV Radio host
- Kevin Reed Jr., ARCA Menards Series crew chief
- Charles Robinson, WWE referee
- Reed Sorenson, NASCAR driver
- Ricky Steamboat, former professional wrestler
- Guenther Steiner, former Team Principal of the Haas F1 Formula One team
- J.R. Sweezy, NFL offensive guard, Super Bowl XLVIII champion with the Seattle Seahawks
- Forrest Thompson, former MLB pitcher
- Curt White, former Olympic weightlifter

== Sister city ==
Mooresville has one sister city, as designated by Sister Cities International:

- Hockenheim, Baden-Württemberg, Germany – home of the Hockenheimring, a well-known racetrack. This relationship was started and led in 2002 by Mooresville Senior High School German teacher, Audrey McCulloh.

== See also ==
- List of municipalities in North Carolina
