= Jacob Stirewalt =

Lutheran minister from Virginia

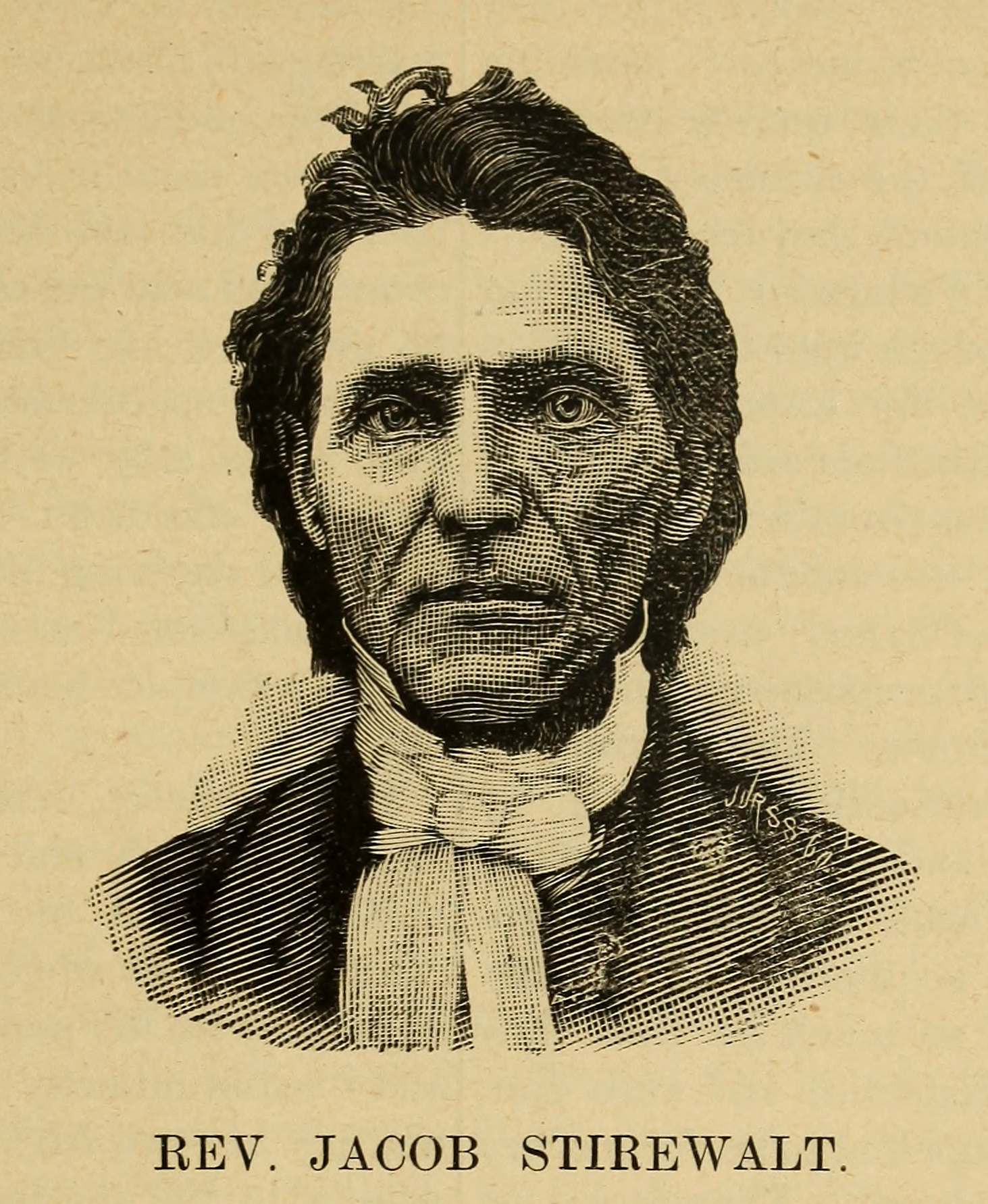
- Born: August 17, 1805; Rowan County, North Carolina
- Died: August 21, 1869 (aged 64); New Market, Virginia
- Occupation: Pastor
- Years active: 1837–1869
- Religion: Lutheran
- Ordained: 1837

The Reverend Jacob Stirewalt was a Lutheran minister serving in Virginia during the mid-19th century. He was born near Salisbury, Rowan County, North Carolina, on Saturday, August 17, 1805, and died at his residence, in New Market, Shenandoah County, Virginia, on Saturday the 21st of August, 1869, at the age of 64 years and 4 days.

Jacob Stirewalt, second son, the third and youngest child of Capt. John and Elizabeth Stirewalt, was baptized in infancy, and later confirmed in the Evangelical Lutheran Church. He was trained and educated by his parents. He gained his theological education by personal study and experience.

Jaocb married Henrietta Henkel, daughter of Elias Henkel, on 8 January 1833 at New Market, Virginia.

Jacob was ordained Deacon, September 14, 1837, and preached his first sermon at Mt. Calvary Church, Page County, Virginia. One of the congregations where he was pastor from 1837 to 1860. On September 14, 1838, he was ordained Pastor, in Lincoln County, North Carolina.

In the 32 years of his ministry, he preached 3132 sermons, of which 560 were funeral discourses, he confirmed 708 persons, he baptized 1259, and he married 171 couples.

As if to complete the circle of his life, just three months before his death, he preached his last sermon in Page County, Virginia, near the same place, at which he preached his first.
