= Murder of Erica Parsons =

Murder of American girl

Erica Lynn Parsons
- Born: February 24, 1998; Concord, North Carolina, US
- Disappeared: December 17, 2011 (aged 13); Salisbury, North Carolina, US
- Status: Deceased
- Died: c. November 19, 2011 (aged 13)
- Body discovered: September 27, 2016; Chesterfield County, South Carolina
- Known for: Child who was reported missing on July 30, 2013
- Parent(s): Carolyn Parsons and Billy Goodman (biological); Sandy and Casey Parsons (adoptive)

Erica Lynn Parsons (February 24, 1998 – c. November 19, 2011) was a 13-year-old girl from Salisbury, North Carolina, who disappeared mysteriously in 2011.

On July 30, 2013, Erica's brother Jamie reported to police she was missing and that he had not seen her since November 2011, stating their parents "killed Erica and buried her in our back yard", but later retracted this. Erica had been adopted at birth and raised by Sandy and Casey Parsons, relatives of her stepfather. When questioned by police, the Parsons claimed that Erica went to live with her biological paternal grandmother. Further investigation revealed Erica had not been seen alive since her disappearance in 2011, and police could not find evidence to support the existence of the grandmother, who relatives claimed was already deceased. In 2014, Casey and Sandy Parsons were convicted of fraudulently accepting federal benefits for Erica when she was not living with them.

In September 2016, Sandy Parsons led authorities to Erica's remains in Chesterfield County, South Carolina. Coroners were unable to determine the exact cause of death, but ruled the manner of death "homicidal violence of undetermined means".

On February 19, 2018, a grand jury indicted Sandy and Casey Parsons in the case.

Casey Parsons pleaded guilty to first degree murder on August 2, 2019, in Rowan County Superior Court. She was sentenced to life without parole.

Sandy Parsons also pleaded guilty, on December 17, 2019, to "second-degree murder, child abuse, concealment of death and obstruction" and was sentenced to at least 33 years.

== Background ==
Erica Lynn Parsons was born on February 24, 1998, to Carolyn Parsons. Carolyn separated from her husband, Steve, who was not the biological father, before Erica was born. Carolyn, who had three other children, felt she couldn't afford to care for Erica and sought alternative placement for her, stating she didn't want the child to grow up in foster care or homeless shelters as she had. Erica was taken in by Sandy and Casey Parsons, the brother and sister-in-law, respectively, of Carolyn Parsons' husband. The adoption was finalized in 2000. Carolyn Parsons had occasional visits with Erica and last saw her in January 2011. Erica's biological father, Billy Dean Goodman, died of natural causes in 2016.

Erica had a slight hearing impairment. She was homeschooled most of her school years.

== Investigation ==
On July 30, 2013, Erica's then 19-year-old adoptive brother, Jamie Parsons, had a fight with his parents, whereupon he reported Erica missing. He said he had not seen his adoptive sister in almost two years. He told police that Erica had been abused, and that he believed his parents had killed Erica, burying her in their backyard. He later retracted those statements, although he later testified at his parents' trial that there had been ongoing abuse. Jamie testified that the last time he saw Erica was November 19, 2011. She was standing in a corner, which was a common punishment Erica endured. "She didn't look too good – she looked like a zombie", he said. "She said she did not feel good. She said she could not breathe too good." Casey Parsons heard this and told her "to shut the fuck up". When he awoke the next morning, his parents had left early, which was unusual, and Erica was gone. His parents returned to the home without Erica and he felt something wasn't right; "Mama looked normal", he said. "Daddy looked sick, like he was about to throw up", Jamie testified. "Mama went on her recliner with the computer. Daddy, it was a blank stare." When asked where Erica was, they told Jamie that Erica had gone to live with her biological grandmother.

Police began an investigation into Erica's disappearance. Casey and Sandy Parsons claimed that Erica was with her biological paternal grandmother Irene "Nan" Goodman in Asheville, North Carolina, a woman they claim to have first made contact with in July 2011 after Goodman wanted to forge a relationship with her granddaughter. Investigators have found no evidence of her existence. Billy Goodman's mother, Cloie Goodman, died in 2005. Before his death, Billy said that there was no Irene Goodman in his family. Casey described Erica and Goodman meeting at a McDonald's in Mooresville, North Carolina, in September 2011, followed by several further visits. On one of those visits in December 2011, Casey said, Erica asked to stay with her grandmother permanently. In February 2012, shortly before Erica's 14th birthday, Casey says, she talked with Erica by telephone for the last time, as further calls reached a disconnected number. Casey told Dr. Phil McGraw on his show that she has since lost the phone number she used.

Sandy and Casey Parsons appeared on the Dr. Phil show on August 20 and 21, 2013. Casey told Dr. Phil that Erica took none of her personal belongings with her because when she went to stay with Goodman, they had purchased all new clothing for her to wear. When Goodman picked her up, a woman who goes by the nickname "Strawberry" was also there and showed them a stash of clothing with tags in the back of their van. The house where she was reportedly staying had a stable with horses. The Parsons claimed that they also took their other daughter, Brook, along with them, to take Erica to Asheville. Brook disputed the claim in her own interviews with police, saying she never rode to Asheville to take Erica to live there.

=== Abuse allegations ===
A number of witnesses testified at the Parsons' trial that Erica was routinely abused by the Parsons family, in particular by her adoptive mom, Casey. Casey's sister, Robin Ashley, testified that Casey beat Erica, often making her stand in the corner. Photographs of Erica standing in the corner on five occasions were presented to the court. Ashley testified that she saw bruises and marks on Erica, and that Casey relinquished the child to Ashley's custody for several months so that Casey "wouldn't kill her". Casey took her back fearing she would get in trouble for receiving money for a child who was not in her home. Warrants showed the couple continued to cash checks when Erica was not living with them.

Jamie Parsons testified that nearly everyone in the family had abused Erica routinely, something that Casey encouraged. According to Jamie, Casey would often bend Erica's fingers backwards to break them, but deny her medical assistance, instead making homemade casts. Jamie also testified that Erica was forced to live in a closet and would be locked inside for hours at a time and was beaten when she relieved herself in the closet. She was also reportedly forced to eat canned dog food. Jamie testified that Erica's adoptive father, Sandy, would often get mad and punch Erica on her head. Soon after Erica was reported missing, Sandy and Casey hired an attorney, believing they were suspects. Investigators found red stains in the house but have not said what tests showed about them.

=== Related federal charges ===
On July 30, 2014, Sandy and Casey Parsons were arrested in Fayetteville on federal fraud charges. The couple had been receiving monthly checks of $634 for adoption assistance and continued cashing those checks after Erica was no longer living with them. They also continued to claim Erica on their taxes. Casey pleaded guilty to 15 charges, while Sandy opted for a trial. A jury found Sandy guilty on most of the charges in October 2014. At a sentencing hearing in federal court on February 18, 2015, Jamie Parsons and Robin Ashley testified about abuse Erica received at the hands of the Parsons family. Federal prosecutor Anand Ramaswamy said there was no record of Erica during the time her adoptive parents illegally accepted money, claiming, "The reason is she's no longer alive." The hearing was continued until March 27.

Prosecutors also presented evidence of a series of scams allegedly perpetuated by Casey Parsons. In 2000, Casey was hired to be a surrogate mother. She became pregnant and took a payment of $10,000 for her services. Weeks later, she called the biological mother, Amy Miller, to say that she had miscarried. Miller says she believed Casey was still pregnant as Casey refused to turn over medical records, changed her phone number, and sent her "nasty emails". Casey then offered to sell the baby to her own sister, Robin, who in turn searched for Miller online to tell her Casey was indeed still pregnant and that Casey had taken money from two other couples who wanted to adopt the baby. Miller was able to take custody of her child at birth after getting law enforcement involved. Evidence was also presented of an eBay scam where Casey accepted money for items listed on eBay, but never sent the items. Judge Schroeder called Casey a "serial swindler".

On March 27, 2015, U.S. District Judge Thomas Schroeder sentenced Casey Parsons to 10 years and her husband to 8 years for fraud. Schroeder "believes Casey was the brains behind what happened" and said Erica "endured horrific abuse", saying that the fraud distracted investigators from the other problems. The judge also said there was no evidence Erica was living. Federal records showed that as of July, Casey Parsons, whose release date as per her plea deal is December 11, 2023, was sent to Carswell Federal Medical Center in Texas. Sandy Parsons, whose release date is March 14, 2022, was sent to Butner Federal Prison in North Carolina. Casey Parsons was later sent to Federal Correctional Center Tallahassee.

Both parents have appealed their sentences. The United States Supreme Court rejected Sandy Parsons's appeal in June 2016.

=== Additional information ===
Sandy and Casey Parsons appeared on the Dr. Phil talk show. As part of the show, Sandy Parsons took a polygraph, and was considered "strongly deceptive" by the former FBI agent who administered the test. Casey Parsons claimed to be experiencing a high level of pain, which could invalidate a polygraph, and never completed it.

On August 27, 2013, Sandy and Casey Parsons moved to Fayetteville. Their two youngest biological children were removed from the home by the Department of Social Services shortly after the criminal case against them began.

On January 30, 2014, the Federal Bureau of Investigation offered a $25,000 reward, in addition to the $10,000 offered by the sheriff, for information leading to the location of the girl. Six months later, the total reward increased to $50,000.

In September 2015, an Illinois tracker dog company called K-9 Specialties came to Salisbury after being hired by local residents.

On September 29, 2016, after another round of searches and questioning, Sandy Parsons led investigators to Erica's skeletal remains. They were buried in a small grave near the home of Sandy's mother on Blair Hendrick Road, between the towns of Pageland and Mount Croghan, South Carolina. Before the discovery, detectives recovered items in the search of a shed on property belonging to Sandy, including: a video tape, a hammer, teeth, and school records.

== Discovery of remains ==
After talking to investigators on numerous occasions, Sandy Parsons led authorities to the remains of Erica Parsons that had been buried in Chesterfield County, South Carolina.

Investigators conducted several interviews with Sandy Parsons in accordance with the warrant.

According to the warrant, Sandy Parsons admitted his "harsh treatment" of Erica.

"The treatment included, but was not limited to, locking Erica in a closet, beating her with a belt buckle, bending her fingers back and choking her", the warrant states.

Dr. Cynthia Brown of the University of North Carolina School of Medicine, characterized the treatment of Erica as "child torture."

The warrant also lays out exactly how investigators from Rowan County were able to locate Erica's remains in South Carolina.

The warrant states that in August, Sandy Parsons acknowledged to Rowan County Sheriff's investigator Chad Moose that Erica was dead. Sandy Parsons described the treatment Erica received, and the disposal of her body.

Sandy Parsons said that the body was discarded on December 19, 2011, and that it could be found off Taylor Chapel Road in Pageland, South Carolina, near the home of his mother.

Investigators worked with Rowan County District Attorney Brandy Cook to obtain a release for Sandy Parsons to leave his prison campus so that he could lead investigators to Erica's remains.

On September 20, an Order for Custody of a Federal Inmate was issued by a judge, allowing an Escort Team to take custody of Sandy Parsons and bring him from the Butner prison to Pageland so that he could "show the location of Erica Parsons' clandestine grave".

The body was recovered in that location, and Sandy Parsons was returned to the prison at Butner.

== Autopsy results ==
The North Carolina Office of the Medical Examiner reported that Erica died of "homicidal violence of undetermined means". According to the autopsy, Erica had many fractures in various stages of healing. Fractures were found in her nose, jaw, upper right arm, nine ribs and several vertebrae. The state of her bones also showed evidence of malnourishment. The Rowan County Sheriff received the report January 9, 2018, and began the process of determining criminal charges.

== Charges and sentencing ==
On February 19, 2018, a grand jury indicted both Sandy and Casey Parsons on counts of "first-degree murder, felony child abuse inflicting serious injury, felony concealment of death and felony obstruction of justice". Casey Parsons was brought to Rowan County for a court appearance on March 14, 2018, while Sandy Parsons was brought back for a court hearing on March 15. Prosecutors announced in April 2018 that they were seeking the death penalty for both Casey and Sandy Parsons.

As of February 2019, defense attorneys agreed to separate trials.

Casey Parsons pleaded guilty to first degree murder on August 2, 2019, in Rowan County Superior Court and was sentenced to life without parole.

The trial date for Sandy Parsons was set for April 6, 2020, and his attorney requested a change of venue. Sandy Parsons pleaded guilty to "second-degree murder, child abuse, concealment of death and obstruction" on December 17, 2019, and was sentenced to at least 33 years, to be served after his federal sentence.

On January 14, 2022, according to the Federal Bureau of Prisons web site, Sandy Parsons was released from federal custody after completing his sentence for tax and mail fraud in connection with benefits received on behalf of Erica. That same day he began serving a state sentence in Central Prison.

Federal Bureau of Prisons records show Casey Parsons was released from federal custody November 25, 2023, to begin serving her state sentence. At that time her husband was listed as a prisoner at Alexander Correctional Institution.

== See also ==
- List of people who disappeared mysteriously (2000–present)
