= South Carolina Highway 268 =

State highway of South Carolina

South Carolina Highway 268

Route information
- Maintained by SCDOT
- Length: 5.630 mi (9.061 km)

Major junctions
- South end: SC 265 near Ruby
- North end: SC 9 / SC 109 in Mount Croghan

Location
- Country: United States
- State: South Carolina
- Counties: Chesterfield

Highway system
- South Carolina State Highway System; Interstate; US; State; Scenic
← SC 267	→ SC 269

South Carolina Highway 268 (SC 268) is a 5.630-mile-long (9.061 km) state highway in the U.S. state of South Carolina. The highway connects rural areas of Chesterfield County with Mount Croghan.

== Route description ==
SC 268 begins at an intersection with SC 265 at a point southwest of Ruby, within a rural part of Chesterfield County. It travels to the northeast and crosses Little Black Creek. It continues in a fairly northeastern direction and crosses Deep Creek just before entering the city limits of Mount Croghan. In the center of town, it meets its northern terminus, an intersection with SC 9 and SC 109 (Main Street/Camden Road).

== Major intersections ==
The entire route is in Chesterfield County.

Location	mi	km	Destinations	Notes
	0.000	0.000	SC 265 – Jefferson, Chesterfield	Southern terminus
Mount Croghan	5.630	9.061	SC 9 (Main Street) / SC 109 (Main Street / Camden Road) – Pageland, Chesterfield, Wadesboro	Northern terminus
1.000 mi = 1.609 km; 1.000 km = 0.621 mi
