= South Carolina Highway 9 =

Highway in South Carolina, USA

South Carolina Highway 9
- SC 9 highlighted in red, special routes in blue

Route information
- Maintained by SCDOT
- Length: 259.570 mi (417.737 km)
- Existed: 1922–present

Major junctions
- South end: SC 65 in Cherry Grove Beach
- US 17 in North Myrtle Beach; US 76 in Nichols; US 301 / US 501 in Dillon; I-95 in Dillon; US 15 / US 401 in Bennettsville; US 1 / US 52 in Cheraw; US 521 in Lancaster; I-77 near Richburg; I-585 / US 176 / US 221 in Spartanburg; I-85 in Spartanburg
- North end: NC 9 at the North Carolina state line near New Prospect

Location
- Country: United States
- State: South Carolina
- Counties: Horry, Marion, Dillon, Marlboro, Chesterfield, Lancaster, Chester, Union, Spartanburg

Highway system
- South Carolina State Highway System; Interstate; US; State; Scenic
| ← SC 8 | → SC 10 |

South Carolina Highway 9 (SC 9) is a 259.570-mile (418 km) major state highway in the U.S. state of South Carolina. The highway travels from Cherry Grove Beach to the North Carolina state line upstate. The highway is currently the longest state highway in South Carolina. It is signed as a north–south highway, even though it mostly travels in an east–west direction.

== Route description ==
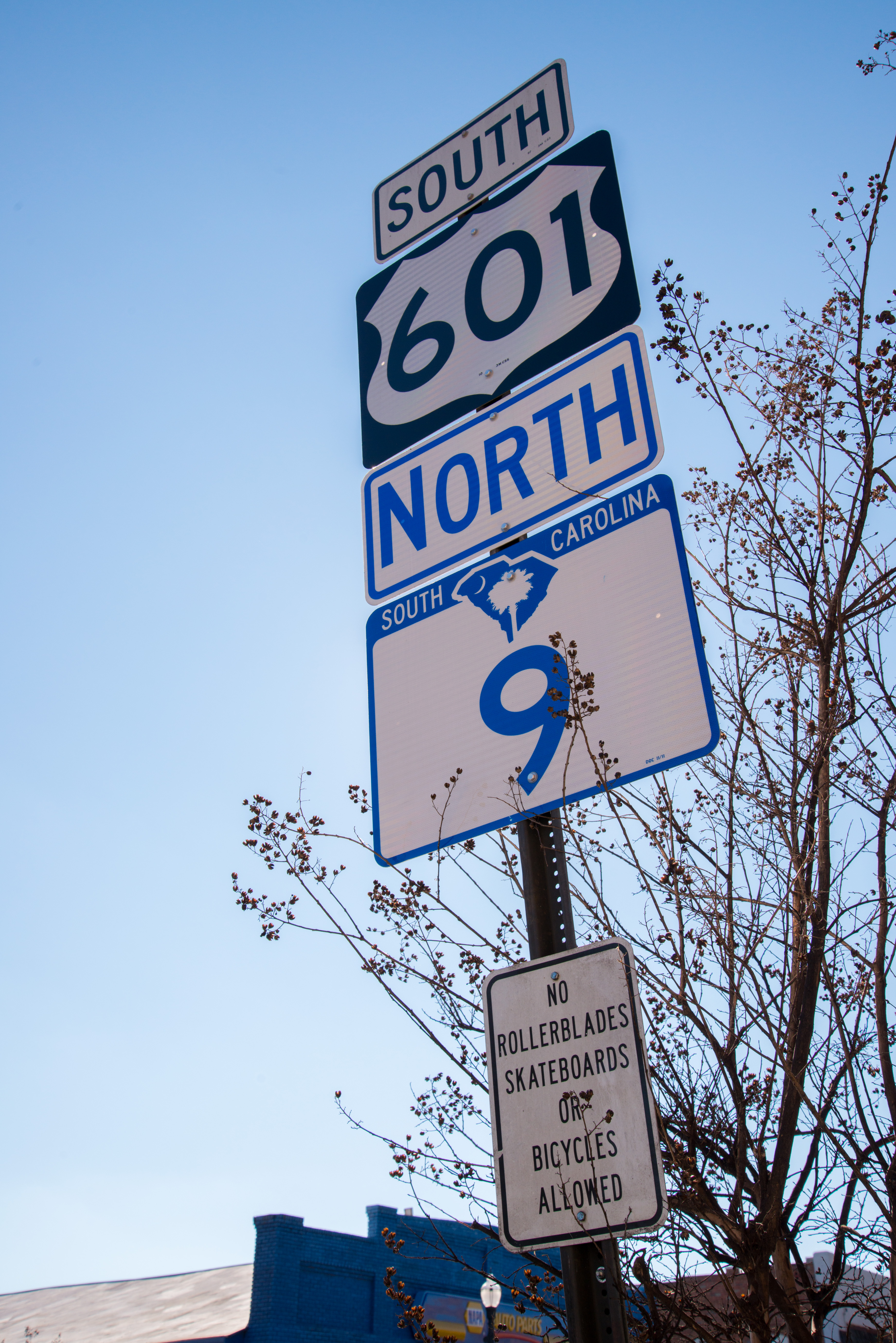
South US 601/North SC 9 in Pageland

SC 9 begins at the North Carolina-South Carolina border, where the road continues as NC 9. This is about twelve miles (19 km) northwest of Spartanburg.

The road slowly heads southeast to Spartanburg. Five miles into its existence SC 9 intersects SC 11 and then two miles (3.2 km) later, SC 9 intersects SC 292. After this, SC 9 enters Boiling Springs.

Finally, SC 9 enters the northeast section of Spartanburg and crosses over Interstate 85 and Interstate 585. Then SC 9 joins up with US Route 176. While concurrent, it intersects US Route 29 and a couple of other state highways. Finally, after the ten-mile concurrency with US Route 176 ends, SC 9 leaves the Spartanburg metro.

About 1.5 miles (2.4 km) east of this concurrency, SC 9 intersects SC 150 in downtown Pacolet. In another five miles (8.0 km) or so, SC 9 enters Jonesville, where SC 9 merges with SC 18. SC 9 merges off SC 18 nearly a mile out of town.

The next town, Lockhart, is nearly 7.5 miles (12.1 km) away. On the way there, SC 9 runs across SC 114 and SC 105. Once in downtown Lockhart, SC 9 merges with SC 49 for nearly a half-mile.

The next town is six miles to the east. That town is Chester. There SC 9 avoids the city by going south and merging with SC 97 and SC 121 Bypass.

Eight miles east of Chester, SC 9 crosses over Interstate 77 and enters Richburg. SC 9 merges with SC 901 for about a mile. Once in downtown, SC 9 turns left and out of Richburg. It then enters Fort Lawn, where it goes under US Route 21.

SC 9 then enters the rapidly growing city of Lancaster. Right before it enters town, SC 9 Business spreads off. SC 9 then meets/crosses over US Route 521 and SC 200.

Finally, SC 9 enters the rural area of north central SC and rolls through the countryside at interstate speeds, with the biggest thing on the road to Pageland being an intersection with SC 522. While entering Pageland, SC 9 merges with US Route 601. US 601 merges off with SC 151 in downtown Pageland.

SC 9 is the northern terminus of SC 268 in Mt. Croghan. It is another mile to Ruby, during which SC 9 is concurrent with SC 109.

SC 9 curves left when it serves as the eastern terminus to SC 265 one mile (1.6 km) from Ruby. Having turned east, SC 9 enters Chesterfield. Once again, it breaks off in a business route and then it meets SC 102 and SC 145.

SC 9 then proceeds onto Cheraw. While entering downtown, SC 9 merges with US Route 52 and then onto US Route 1 to get out of town. SC 9 merges off US 1 after downtown, and SC 9 heads east, where it shortly meets SC 177 and then SC 79.

Seven miles southeast of Cheraw, SC 9 runs into Bennettsville. SC 9 merges with SC 38 for nearly four miles, then both merge briefly with US 15-401. SC 9 runs eastward with US 15-401 for nearly a mile before merging off again. There is another SC 9 Business Route.

SC 9 then proceeds onto the tiny town of Clio where the main intersection is with SC 381.

Nearly seven miles later, after merging SC 57, SC 9/57 crosses under I-95 and enters Dillon. There SC 9/57 merges with US Route 301 before all three go their separate ways.

A further ten miles (16 km) to the east, SC 9 meets up with SC 41 in Lake View. Here SC 9 comes very close to the NC border (about two miles (3.2 km) south), but as soon as SC 9 leaves town, it heads due south into deep rural land for nine to ten miles (16 km).

Finally, SC 9 enters Nichols where it merges with US Route 76 for a little more than a mile. Another six miles (9.7 km) goes by before SC 9 begins to enter the beach zone, as another SC 9 Business Route merges off. With SC 9 Bus, SC 9 is able to avoid downtown Loris, go by the Twin City Airport, and have an interchange with US Route 701.

After meeting back up with its Business Route, SC 9 heads towards the NC border, this time as close as a mile. Yet again, SC 9 bends south where it meets SC 905 in Longs, an interchange with SC 31; and then heads into downtown North Myrtle Beach. There it crosses over US Route 17 and SC 90 and goes through one mile (1.6 km) of beach, where it continues as SC 65 along the beachfront.

== History ==
Established in 1922 as an original state highway, it traversed from SC 23 in Dillon, west to SC 10, in Enoree. By 1926, SC 9 was extended east to Lake View, then replacing SC 47 to Green Sea, then southeast on new primary routing to Little River. On its northern end, SC 9 rerouted from Kelly to SC 19, near Spartanburg, replacing SC 92. The route from Kelly to Enoree was renumbered SC 92.

In 1927, SC 9 was rerouted between Pageland to Lancaster on a more southern route, avoiding the Tradesville area; The old alignment was briefly downgraded to secondary before being renumbered as SC 906. In 1933, SC 9 was realigned on a straight path from Loris to Little River; most of the old route was downgraded to secondary, with exception to Wampee and eastward becoming SC 90. In 1936, SC 9 was extended north through Spartanburg and Boiling Springs to its current northern terminus at the North Carolina state line; replacing SC 177.

In 1940, SC 9 was extended south as a new primary routing to Cherry Grove Beach. Between 1943 and 1946, SC 9 was rerouted onto Pine Street between Pacolet to Spartanburg; the old route was downgraded to secondary, but then later became SC 295 in 1948. In 1947, it replaced the part of SC 100 in Chesterfield. In 1948, SC 9 south end was truncated at US 17, at Nixons Crossroads; the route to Cherry Grove Beach was downgraded. In 1949, SC 9 was given a southern bypass of Chesterfield, leaving its first business loop through the downtown (since decommissioned). Also in that same year, SC 9 was moved on a more direct routing between Pageland to Lancaster, replacing SC 906; the old routing was renumbered as SC 902 and SC 903 (today US 601).

In 1956, SC 9 was given a southern bypass of Chester, leaving a business loop through downtown. By 1962, SC 9 was rerouted in Spartanburg, utilizing Pine Street to Interstate 585, then north along Boiling Springs Road. Part of the old routing through the downtown area became part of SC 56. By 1967, SC 9 was given a northern bypass of Lancaster, leaving a business loop through downtown. In 1974, SC 9 was rerouted north into Dillon via US 301/US 501; leaving 3rd Avenue (later becoming Martin Luther King Jr. Boulevard).

From 1982 to 1985, SC 9 moved onto bypass route from Loris to Green Sea, leaving a business loop through downtown Loris. Also around that same time, SC 9 was moved onto a western bypass of Bennettsville, leaving a business loop through downtown. By 1988, SC 9 was re-extended to its current southern terminus at Cherry Grove Beach, replacing part of SC 65.

== Major intersections ==
| County | Location | mi | km | Destinations | Notes |
|---|---|---|---|---|---|
| Horry | Cherry Grove Beach | 0.000 | 0.000 | SC 65 south (Ocean Boulevard) – North Myrtle Beach | Southern terminus of SC 9; northern terminus of SC 65 |
| Horry | North Myrtle Beach | 1.520 | 2.446 | US 17 south (Kings Highway) – North Myrtle Beach | Southern end of US 17 concurrency; interchange |
| Horry | Little River | | | SC 90 to US 17 north – Conway, Wilmington | Interchange |
| Horry | Little River | 2.370 | 3.814 | US 17 north – Wilmington | Northern end of US 17 concurrency; no southbound exit; interchange |
| Horry | Little River | 4.299– 4.320 | 6.919– 6.952 | SC 31 south (Carolina Bays Parkway) – Myrtle Beach, Georgetown | Interchange |
| Horry | Longs | 9.730 | 15.659 | SC 905 (Pireway Road) – Conway, Pireway | |
| Horry | | 16.690 | 26.860 | SC 9 Bus. north – Loris | Southern terminus of SC 9 Bus. |
| Horry | Loris | 23.350– 23.396 | 37.578– 37.652 | US 701 – Loris, Tabor City | |
| Horry | Green Sea | 29.850 | 48.039 | SC 410 / SC 9 Bus. south – Green Sea, Loris | Northern terminus of SC 9 Bus. |
| Horry | | 41.300 | 66.466 | US 76 east – Fair Bluff | Southern end of US 76 concurrency |
| Marion | Nichols | 42.900 | 69.041 | US 76 west (Mullins Street) – Mullins, Marion | Northern end of US 76 concurrency |
| Dillon | Lake View | 51.130 | 82.286 | South Main Street north (SC 9 Conn. north) to SC 41 – Lumberton | Southern terminus of SC 9 Conn., which shares the South Main Street name |
| Dillon | Lake View | 51.400 | 82.720 | SC 41 (Richard Temple Boulevard) – Marion, Marietta | |
| Dillon | Dillon | 63.680 | 102.483 | SC 57 south (Lockemy Highway) – Mullins | Southern end of SC 57 concurrency |
| Dillon | Dillon | 64.440 | 103.706 | US 301 south / US 501 south / SC 34 west – Latta, Darlington | Southern end of US 301/US 501 concurrency |
| Dillon | Dillon | 65.380 | 105.219 | US 301 north / US 501 north (Second Avenue) – Fayetteville | Northern end of US 301/US 501 concurrency |
| Dillon | Dillon | 66.560 | 107.118 | I-95 – Florence, Fayetteville | I-95 exit 193 |
| Dillon | Little Rock | 69.830 | 112.380 | SC 57 north | Northern end of SC 57 concurrency |
| Marlboro | Clio | 81.670 | 131.435 | SC 381 (Society Street / Red Bluff Street) – McColl, Blenheim | |
| Marlboro | | | | I-73 | Proposed interchange |
| Marlboro | Bennettsville | 89.270 | 143.666 | US 15 north / US 401 north – McColl | Southern end of US 15/US 401 concurrency |
| Marlboro | Bennettsville | | | SC 38 south / SC 9 Bus. north / SC 38 Bus. north (Broad Street) – Marion, Myrtle Beach | Southern end of SC 38 concurrency; southern terminus of SC 9 Bus. and SC 38 Bus. |
| Marlboro | Bennettsville | 91.240 | 146.837 | US 15 south / US 401 south – Society Hill, Hartsville | Northern end of US 15/US 401 concurrency |
| Marlboro | Bennettsville | 91.700 | 147.577 | SC 385 (Main Street) – Hartsville | |
| Marlboro | Bennettsville | 93.530 | 150.522 | SC 38 north (Oakwood Street) / SC 9 Bus. south (Cheraw Highway) – Hamlet | Northern end of SC 38 concurrency; northern terminus of SC 9 Bus. |
| Marlboro | | 97.540 | 156.975 | SC 79 north – Laurinburg | Southern terminus of SC 79 |
| Marlboro | | 98.750 | 158.923 | SC 912 south (Willamette Road) | Northern terminus of SC 912 |
| Marlboro | Wallace | 103.940 | 167.275 | SC 177 north – Hamlet | Southern terminus of SC 177 |
| Marlboro | Wallace | 104.740 | 168.563 | US 1 north – Rockingham | Southern end of US 1 concurrency |
| Chesterfield | Cheraw | | | US 1 Truck south / US 52 Truck / SC 9 Truck north (Front Street) – Old St. David's Church | Northern terminus of US 1 Truck; southern terminus of SC 9 Truck |
| Chesterfield | Cheraw | | | US 52 north (2nd Street) – Morven, Wadesboro | Southern end of US 52 concurrency |
| Chesterfield | Cheraw | 107.880 | 173.616 | US 1 south / US 52 south – Camden, Columbia | Northern end of US 1 and US 52 concurrencies |
| Chesterfield | | | | SC 9 Truck south (Four Mile Loop Road) | Northern terminus of SC 9 Truck |
| Chesterfield | Chesterfield | 119.200 | 191.834 | SC 102 south (Craig Street) – Hartsville | Northern terminus of SC 102 |
| Chesterfield | Chesterfield | 119.510 | 192.333 | SC 145 – McBee, Wadesboro | |
| Chesterfield | Ruby | 123.320 | 198.464 | SC 265 west – Jefferson | Eastern terminus of SC 265 |
| Chesterfield | Ruby | 125.400 | 201.812 | SC 109 south (Market Street) | Southern end of SC 109 concurrency |
| Chesterfield | Mount Croghan | 128.550 | 206.881 | SC 109 north / SC 268 south (Depot Street) – Jefferson, Wadesboro | Northern end of SC 109 concurrency; northern terminus of SC 268 |
| Chesterfield | Pageland | 137.840 | 221.832 | SC 151 (Van Lingle Mungo Boulevard) – Hartsville, Monroe | |
| Chesterfield | Pageland | 138.380 | 222.701 | US 601 north / SC 151 Bus. (Pearl Street) | Southern end of US 601 concurrency |
| Chesterfield | Pageland | | | SC 207 north (Elm Street) – Monroe | Southern terminus of SC 207 |
| Chesterfield | Pageland | 141.870 | 228.318 | US 601 south – Kershaw | Northern end of US 601 concurrency |
| Lancaster | Buford | 152.520 | 245.457 | SC 522 – Heath Springs | |
| Lancaster | Lancaster | 159.870 | 257.286 | US 521 south (Lancaster Bypass) / SC 9 Bus. north (Arch Street) – Lancaster, Heath Springs | Southern end of US 521 concurrency; southern terminus of SC 9 Bus.; interchange |
| Lancaster | Lancaster | | | SC 200 (Monroe Highway) – Lancaster | Interchange |
| Lancaster | Lancaster | 161.820 | 260.424 | US 521 north / US 521 Bus. south (Charlotte Highway) – Van Wyck, Charlotte | Northern end of US 521 concurrency; northern terminus of US 521 Bus. |
| Lancaster | Lancaster | 164.850 | 265.300 | SC 9 Bus. south (Meeting Street) / Riverside Road – Lancaster, Van Wyck | Northern terminus of SC 9 Bus. |
| Chester | Fort Lawn | 169.050 | 272.060 | US 21 (Catawba River Road) – Rock Hill, Great Falls | |
| Chester | | 173.770 | 279.656 | SC 99 south (Richburg Road) – Great Falls | Northern terminus of SC 99 |
| Chester | Richburg | 177.170 | 285.127 | SC 901 south (Mountain Gap Road) – Richburg | Southern end of SC 901 concurrency |
| Chester | Richburg | 177.540 | 285.723 | SC 223 east (Wylies Mill Road) | Western terminus of SC 223; to Landsford Canal State Park |
| Chester | | 178.730 | 287.638 | SC 901 north (Edgeland Road) – Edgemoor | Northern end of SC 901 concurrency |
| Chester | | 179.090– 179.099 | 288.217– 288.232 | I-77 – Charlotte, Columbia | I-77 exit 65 |
| Chester | | 182.170 | 293.174 | SC 909 west (Oakley Hall School Road) | Eastern terminus of SC 909 |
| Chester | Chester | 188.810 | 303.860 | SC 72 west / SC 97 north / SC 121 north (J.A. Cochran Bypass) SC 9 Bus. north (Lancaster Street) | Southern end of SC 72/SC 121 and SC 97 concurrencies; southern terminus of SC 9 Bus. |
| Chester | Chester | 190.030 | 305.824 | US 321 south / US 321 Bus. north / SC 97 south (Columbia Road) – Winnsboro | Northern end of SC 97 concurrency; southern end of US 321 concurrency |
| Chester | Chester | | | SC 72 west / SC 121 south (West End Street) – Carlisle | Northern end of SC 72/SC 121 concurrency |
| Chester | Chester | | | SC 9 Bus. east (Pinckney Street) | Western terminus of SC 9 Bus. |
| Chester | Chester | 192.950 | 310.523 | US 321 north (Lowrys Highway) – York | Northern end of US 321 concurrency |
| Chester | | 207.130 | 333.343 | SC 49 north (Lockhart Highway) – York | Southern end of SC 49 concurrency |
| Union | Lockhart | 207.840 | 334.486 | SC 49 south (Lockhart Highway) – Union | Northern end of SC 49 concurrency |
| Union | | 210.380 | 338.574 | SC 105 (Mount Tabor Church Road) – Union | |
| Union | | 219.460 | 353.187 | SC 114 – Gaffney, Union | |
| Union | | 221.490 | 356.454 | SC 18 south (Jonesville Highway) – Union | Southern end of SC 18 concurrency |
| Union | Jonesville | 222.550 | 358.160 | SC 18 north (Pacolet Street) – Gaffney | Northern end of SC 18 concurrency |
| Union | Jonesville | 222.890 | 358.707 | Church Street to US 176 | Southern terminus of SC 9 Conn. |
| Spartanburg | Pacolet | 229.310 | 369.039 | SC 150 (Glenn Springs Road) – Glenn Springs, Gaffney | |
| Spartanburg | Pacolet | 231.290 | 372.225 | US 176 east – Union | Southern end of US 176 concurrency |
| Spartanburg | Pacolet | | | SC 295 north (Southport Road) | Southern terminus of SC 295 |
| Spartanburg | Spartanburg | | | US 29 (Saint John Street) – Cowpens | |
| Spartanburg | Spartanburg | | | SC 296 west (Daniel Morgan Avenue) | Eastern terminus of SC 296 |
| Spartanburg | Spartanburg | | | East Wood Street west (US 176 Conn. east) | No access from US 176 east/SC 9 south to US 176 Conn.; eastern terminus of US 176 Conn. and East Wood Street; provides access to Spartanburg Medical Center |
| Spartanburg | Spartanburg | 241.360 | 388.431 | US 221 (Whitney Road) – Chesnee | Southern end of I-585 concurrency; I-585 exit 25B |
| Spartanburg | Spartanburg | 241.780 | 389.107 | I-585 north (Boiling Springs Road) / US 176 west / North Church Street (US 176 Conn. east) | Northern end of I-585 and US 176 concurrencies; western terminus of US 176 Conn.; access to northbound via Milliken Road; I-585 exit 25A |
| Spartanburg | Spartanburg | 243.230– 243.258 | 391.441– 391.486 | I-85 BL – Charlotte, Greenville | I-85 Bus. exit 6 |
| Spartanburg | Boiling Springs | 244.631– 244.670 | 393.695– 393.758 | I-85 – Charlotte, Greenville | I-85 exit 75 |
| Spartanburg | | 251.935 | 405.450 | SC 292 south – Inman | Northern terminus of SC 292 |
| Spartanburg | New Prospect | 254.910 | 410.238 | SC 11 (Cherokee Foothills Scenic Highway) – Campobello, Chesnee | |
| Spartanburg | | 259.570 | 417.737 | NC 9 north – Mill Spring | Continuation beyond North Carolina state line |
1.000 mi = 1.609 km; 1.000 km = 0.621 mi: Concurrency terminus; Unopened

== Special routes ==
=== Loris business loop ===
South Carolina Highway 9 Business
- Location: Loris, South Carolina
- Length: 14.990 mi (24.124 km)
- Existed: 1982–present

South Carolina Highway 9 Business (SC 9 Bus.) begins nearly 5 miles (8.0 km) northwest of Loris, heading due south from SC 9. However, it only goes south for about 1 mile (1.6 km), before turning eastward at the eastern terminus of SC 917. SC 9 Bus. then heads into downtown Loris, the downtown being at the intersection with U.S. Route 701 (US 701). As soon as SC 9 Bus. passes US 701, it heads 1.5 miles (2.4 km) back to SC 9.

=== Lake View connector route ===
South Carolina Highway 9 Connector
- Location: Lake View, South Carolina
- Length: 0.170 mi (274 m)

South Carolina Highway 9 Connector (SC 9 Conn.) is a 0.170-mile (0.274 km) connector route in the northern part of Lake View that is an unsigned highway. It begins at an intersection with the SC 9 where it turns left off of South Main Street and onto West 3rd Avenue. It travels to the north on South Main Street to an intersection with SC 41, where it turns left off of Richard Temple Boulevard and onto North Main Street.

=== Bennettsville business loop ===
South Carolina Highway 9 Business
- Location: Bennettsville, South Carolina
- Length: 2.400 mi (3.862 km)
- Existed: 1985–present

South Carolina Highway 9 Business (SC 9 Bus.) begins 1 mile (1.6 km) north of Bennettsville when SC 9 merges with SC 38. SC 9 Bus. heads straight into downtown Bennettsville, where just before downtown SC 9 merges with SC 385. There it travels just north of downtown before moving south in the outskirts of town and ends again at SC 9.

=== Cheraw alternate route ===
South Carolina Highway 9 Alternate
- Location: Cheraw, South Carolina
- Existed: c. 1942–1947

South Carolina Highway 9 Alternate (SC 9 Alt.) was an alternate route that existed in the central part of Cheraw. It was established around 1942 on Kershaw Street between US 1/US 52 and SC 9. It was decommissioned in 1947 and was downgraded to a secondary road.

=== Cheraw truck route ===
South Carolina Highway 9 Truck
- Location: Cheraw, South Carolina
- Length: 5.890 mi (9.479 km)

South Carolina Highway 9 Truck (SC 9 Truck) is a 5.890-mile (9.479 km) truck route partially within the northeastern part of Cheraw. It is entirely within the northeastern part of Chesterfield County. It begins at an intersection with US 1/SC 9 (Powe Street). This intersection is also the northern terminus of US 1 Truck. From this point, US 52 Truck and SC 9 Truck travel to the northwest. They travel through a residential area of the city. They curve to the west-northwest and intersect US 52 (Second Street). Here, US 52 Truck ends, and SC 9 Truck turns right and follows US 52 to the northwest. They cross over Huckleberry Branch on the Patrolman Gilbert "Gil" Halma Bridge. Here, they leave the city limits proper of Cheraw, but still travel along the eastern edge of the city. After they leave the city for good, they intersect the northern terminus of Four-Mile Loop Road. Here, SC 9 splits off to the southwest. It travels through a rural part of the county. It curves to the south-southeast and meets its northern terminus, another intersection with SC 9.

The entire route is in Chesterfield County.

| Location | mi | km | Destinations | Notes |
|---|---|---|---|---|
| Cheraw | 0.000 | 0.000 | US 1 north / SC 9 south – Rockingham, Bennettsville, Wallace US 1 Truck south / US 52 Truck east (Front Street south) – Old St. David's Church, Pee Dee River access, Historical area US 1 south / SC 9 north – Historical area | Southern end of US 52 Truck concurrency; southern terminus of SC 9 Truck; northern terminus of US 1 Truck |
| Cheraw | 0.320 | 0.515 | US 52 east (Second Street) – Cheraw | Northern end of US 52 Truck concurrency; southern end of US 52 concurrency; western terminus of US 52 Truck |
| Cheraw | 0.690 | 1.110 | Patrolman Gilbert "Gil" Halma Bridge | Crossing over Huckleberry Branch |
| | 3.490 | 5.617 | US 52 west – Wadesboro | Northern end of US 52 concurrency |
| | 5.890 | 9.479 | SC 9 – Chesterfield, Cheraw, Historic area, Downtown | Northern terminus; provides access to McLeod Health Cheraw |
1.000 mi = 1.609 km; 1.000 km = 0.621 mi: Concurrency terminus

=== Chesterfield business loop ===
South Carolina Highway 9 Business
- Location: Chesterfield, South Carolina
- Length: 2.2 mi (3.5 km)
- Existed: 1949–1956

South Carolina Highway 9 Business was a business loop along Main Street in Chesterfield. Established in 1949, when SC 9 was moved onto new road, bypassing south of Main Street; however, by 1956, SC 9 Business was already decommissioned. Though official maps from the state show that Main Street is a secondary road (SC-S-13-1), some online mapping sites still label it as a branch of SC 9.

=== Lancaster alternate route ===
South Carolina Highway 9 Alternate
- Location: Lancaster, South Carolina
- Existed: c. 1942–1947

South Carolina Highway 9 Alternate (SC 9 Alt.) was an alternate route that existed in the northern part of Lancaster. It was established around 1942 between US 521 south of the city to where US 521 and SC 9 split north of downtown. It was decommissioned in 1947 and was downgraded to a secondary road. Today, its path is part of US 521 and SC 9 Business (SC 9 Bus.).

=== Lancaster business loop ===
South Carolina Highway 9 Business
- Location: Lancaster, South Carolina
- Length: 5.370 mi (8.642 km)
- Existed: 1967–present

South Carolina Highway 9 Business (SC 9 Bus.) merges off SC 9 (F.W. McWhirter Expressway) about 2 miles (3.2 km) northwest of Lancaster. After going south for one-half-mile (0.80 km), SC 9 Bus. bends eastwards and heads straight in that direction. SC 9 Bus. merges onto U.S. Route 521 (US 521) for one block and then merges back off, crosses over SC 200, and quickly SC 9 Bus. is out of downtown on East Arch Street. A one-half-mile (0.80 km) after crossing over SC 200, SC 9 Bus. ends at SC 9. Other than Spartanburg, the City of Lancaster is the largest urban area SC 9 travels through before reaching the North Myrtle Beach area.

=== Richburg alternate route ===
South Carolina Highway 9 Alternate
- Location: Richburg, South Carolina
- Existed: 1939–1947

South Carolina Highway 9 Alternate (SC 9 Alt.) was an alternate route that existed in the central part of Richburg. It was established in 1939 between SC 9 and SC 901. It was decommissioned in 1947 and was downgraded to a secondary road.

=== Chester business loop ===
- Location: Chester, South Carolina
- Length: 2.850 mi (4.587 km)
- Existed: 1956–present

South Carolina Highway 9 Business (SC 9 Bus.) is a business route in the city of Chester. Like all the numbered highways in Chester, it goes straight through downtown, and the bypass route makes a half-moon path around Chester. SC 9 Bus. shares a brief concurrency with US 321 Bus./SC 97 Bus., and then with SC 72/SC 121 Bus.

=== Jonesville alternate route ===
South Carolina Highway 9 Alternate
- Location: Jonesville, South Carolina
- Existed: 1938–1947

South Carolina Highway 9 Alternate (SC 9 Alt.) was an alternate route that existed in the northern part of Jonesville. It was established in 1938 on Church Street between SC 9 and SC 11. It was decommissioned in 1947 and was downgraded to a secondary road. Today, it is known as SC 9 Connector.

=== Jonesville connector route ===
South Carolina Highway 9 Connector
- Location: Jonesville, South Carolina
- Length: 0.090 mi (145 m)

South Carolina Highway 9 Connector (SC 9 Conn.) is a 0.090-mile-long (0.145 km) connector route in the north-central part of Jonesville, in the northwestern part of Union County. It is a brief link between the SC 9 mainline (Main Street) and SC 18 (Pacolet Street). It is unsigned for its entire length. It begins at an intersection with the SC 9 mainline (Main Street). It takes Church Street in a roughly northwestern direction. It immediately crosses over some railroad tracks of Norfolk Southern Railway. It provides rear access for a textile company. Then, it reaches its northern terminus, an intersection with SC 18 (Pacolet Street).

=== Spartanburg alternate route ===
South Carolina Highway 9 Alternate
- Location: Spartanburg, South Carolina
- Existed: 1946–1947

South Carolina Highway 9 Alternate (SC 9 Alt.) was an alternate route that existed near Pacolet. It was established in 1946 between SC 9 near Pacolet and US 176 (now SC 56) in Spartanburg. It was decommissioned in 1947 and was downgraded to a secondary road. Today, it is partially known as SC 295.
