= South Carolina Highway 265 =

Highway in South Carolina

South Carolina Highway 265

Route information
- Maintained by SCDOT
- Length: 24.690 mi (39.735 km)
- Existed: 1928–present

Major junctions
- West end: US 601 near Kershaw
- East end: SC 9 southeast of Ruby

Location
- Country: United States
- State: South Carolina
- Counties: Lancaster, Chesterfield

Highway system
- South Carolina State Highway System; Interstate; US; State; Scenic
← SC 263	→ SC 267

South Carolina Highway 265 (SC 265) is a 24.690-mile (39.735 km) primary state highway in the U.S. state of South Carolina. It connects Jefferson with the cities of Kershaw and Chesterfield.

== Route description ==
SC 265 is a two-lane rural highway that traverses 24.5 miles (39.4 km) from U.S. Route 601 (US 601) north of Kershaw to SC 9 near Ruby.

== History ==
The highway was established in 1928 as a new primary routing from SC 26 in Kershaw to SC 9 near Ruby. In 1940, it was extended southwest to SC 97 in Liberty Hill. In 1948, it was reduced back to its original route from 1928 to 1940. In 1951 or 1952, SC 265 was shortened to its current eastern terminus with US 601.

== Junction list ==
County	Location	mi	km	Destinations	Notes
Lancaster		0.000	0.000	US 601 (Gold Mine Highway) – Kershaw, Pageland	Western terminus
Lancaster		2.080	3.347	SC 903 (Flat Creek Road) – McBee, Lancaster	
Chesterfield	Jefferson	9.450	15.208	SC 151 Bus. (Main Street)	
Chesterfield	Jefferson	10.100	16.254	SC 151 – McBee, Pageland	
Chesterfield		17.180	27.649	SC 268 north – Mount Croghan	
Chesterfield		22.670	36.484	SC 109 – Ruby, Hartsville	
Chesterfield		24.690	39.735	SC 9 – Ruby, Chesterfield	Eastern terminus
1.000 mi = 1.609 km; 1.000 km = 0.621 mi
