= South Carolina Highway 109 =

Highway in South Carolina

South Carolina Highway 109

Route information
- Maintained by SCDOT
- Length: 14.520 mi (23.368 km)
- Existed: 1938–present

Major junctions
- South end: SC 145 near McBee
- SC 9 in Ruby
- North end: NC 109 at the North Carolina state line near Mount Croghan

Location
- Country: United States
- State: South Carolina
- Counties: Chesterfield

Highway system
- South Carolina State Highway System; Interstate; US; State; Scenic
← SC 107	→ SC 110

South Carolina Highway 109 (SC 109) is a 14.520-mile (23.368 km) primary state highway in the U.S. state of South Carolina. It serves to connect Chesterfield with central Chesterfield County and McBee.

== Route description ==
SC 109 is a two-lane rural highway that traverses from SC 145 through Ruby and Mount Croghan, to the North Carolina state line.

== History ==
SC 109 was established in either 1937 or 1938 as a new primary route from SC 9 in Mount Croghan to the North Carolina state line. In 1939, it was extended south to SC 85. In 1941 or 1942, SC 109 was extended south again to U.S. Route 15 (US 15) in Hartsville; there was also a four-mile (6.4 km) separate piece connecting SC 155 to US 52. In 1948, SC 109 moved back to its current southern terminus at SC 145; both the former extension and separate piece were downgraded to secondary roads.

== Junction list ==
The entire route is in Chesterfield County.

Location	mi	km	Destinations	Notes
	0.000	0.000	SC 145 / Hartsville-Ruby Road – McBee, Chesterfield, Hartsville	Southern terminus
Ruby	6.800	10.944	SC 265 – Jefferson, Chesterfield	
Ruby	8.160	13.132	SC 9 south (Main Street) / Market Street – Chesterfield	Southern end of SC 9 concurrency
Mount Croghan	11.310	18.202	SC 9 north (Main Street) / SC 268 south (Depot Street) – Pageland, Jefferson	Northern end of SC 9 concurrency; northern terminus of SC 268
	14.520	23.368	NC 109 north – Wadesboro	Continuation into North Carolina
1.000 mi = 1.609 km; 1.000 km = 0.621 mi: Concurrency terminus
