= Chesterfield County School District =

Public school district in South Carolina, United States

Address
- 401 West Blvd Chesterfield, South Carolina, 29701; United States

District information
- Type: Public
- Grades: PreK-12
- Superintendent: Dr. Chris Ballenger
- NCES District ID: 4501560

Students and staff
- Enrollment: 6,988 (2019-2020)
- Student–teacher ratio: 13.90

Other information
- Website: www.chesterfieldschools.org

The Chesterfield County School District is a school district that governs public schools in Chesterfield County, South Carolina. Since 1968, Chesterfield County has operated a single school district which now consists of two primary schools, seven elementary/intermediate schools, three middle schools, and four high schools. Total enrollment in the county's public schools for 2009 is estimated to be 8,000 students.

== Schools ==
=== High schools ===
- Central High School, Pageland
- Cheraw High School, Cheraw
- Chesterfield High School, Chesterfield
- McBee High School, McBee

=== Middle schools ===
- Chesterfield/Ruby Middle School, Chesterfield/Ruby
- Long Middle School, Cheraw
- New Heights Middle School, Jefferson
- Robius Middle School

=== Elementary schools ===
- Cheraw Intermediate School, Cheraw
- Edwards Elementary School, Chesterfield
- Jefferson Elementary School, Jefferson
- McBee Elementary School, McBee
- Pageland Elementary School, Pageland
- Plainview Elementary School, Plainview
- Ruby Elementary School, Ruby

=== Primary schools ===
- Cheraw Primary School, Cheraw
- Petersburg Primary School, Pageland
