= Chesterfield County, South Carolina =

County in South Carolina, United States

- County
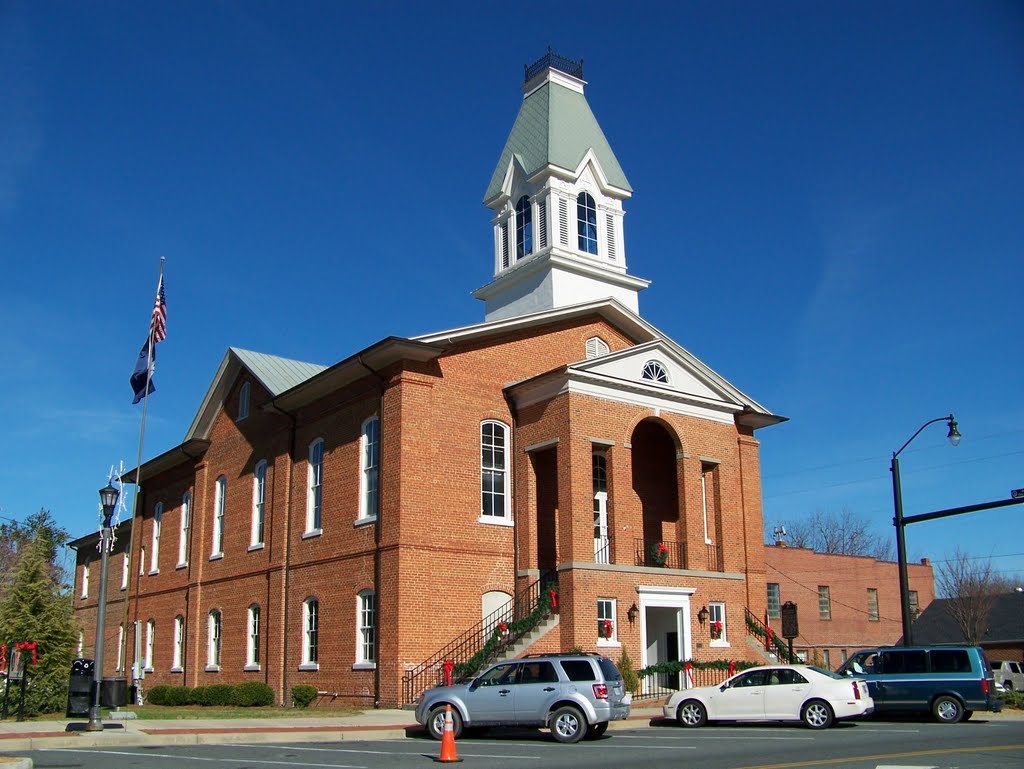
- Old Chesterfield County Courthouse

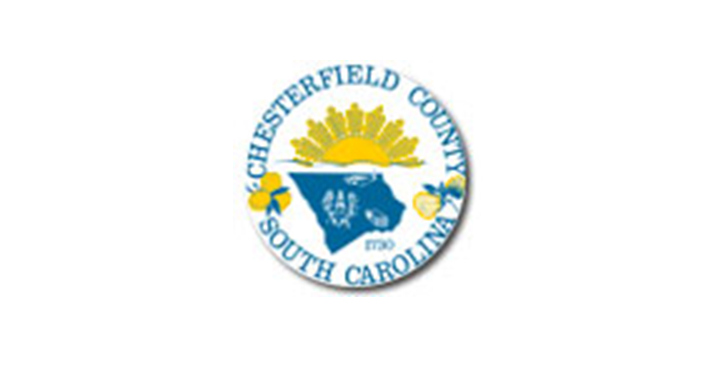
- Flag Seal

- Location within the U.S. state of South Carolina
- Interactive map of Chesterfield County, South Carolina
- Coordinates: 34.64°N 80.16°W
- Country: United States
- State: South Carolina
- Founded: 1785
- Named for: Philip Dormer Stanhope, 4th Earl of Chesterfield
- Seat: Chesterfield
- Largest community: Cheraw

Area
  - Total: 805.66 sq mi (2,086.6 km^{2})
  - Land: 798.99 sq mi (2,069.4 km^{2})
  - Water: 6.67 sq mi (17.3 km^{2}) 0.83%

Population (2020)
  - Total: 43,273
  - Estimate (2025): 44,740 ▲
  - Density: 54.160/sq mi (20.911/km^{2})
- Time zone: UTC−5 (Eastern)
  - Summer (DST): UTC−4 (EDT)
- Congressional district: 7th
- Website: www.chesterfieldcountysc.com

Chesterfield County is a county located in the U.S. state of South Carolina. As of the 2020 census, its population was 43,273. Its county seat is Chesterfield. The largest community in the county is Cheraw. It is located north of the Midlands, in the Pee Dee region, on the border with North Carolina.

== History ==
The county is named for Philip Stanhope, 4th Earl of Chesterfield, a British politician who opposed the Stamp Act of 1765, which was deeply unpopular in South Carolina, and who was known for always speaking up for the rights of the colonists while he was serving in the British Parliament and when he served as British Secretary of State.

The county was formed in 1785, but was part of what was then known as Cheraws District until 1800, at which time Chesterfield became a district itself. In the 1700s, the area that would become Chesterfield County was settled primarily by immigrants from England and Wales, as well as by smaller numbers of immigrants from County Antrim, Ireland, in what has since become Northern Ireland. Northern Irish immigrants were overwhelmingly Presbyterians of Scottish descent, due to the fact that they were from Ireland but were of Scottish origins. They were referred to by the rest of colonial society as "Scotch-Irish" however this was not a term they self-applied, preferring to refer to themselves as "Ulstermen" or "Irish Presbyterians." Under the post-American Civil War (1861–1865) state constitution of 1867, passed during the Reconstruction era, South Carolina districts became counties with home rule.

On April 10, 2020, a case of Influenza A virus subtype H7N3 was confirmed in what The Post and Courier described as "a commercial turkey flock" which resulted in the disinfecting & quarantine of the farm. This is the 1st confirmed case of H7N3 in the United States since another case was found in Lincoln County, Tennessee on March 5, 2017. Four days later on April 14, a second case was confirmed at a turkey farm in Jefferson, South Carolina resulting in the euthanization of 32,000 turkeys. Clemson University released the map of the control area for the first turkey farm infected by the virus on May 4.

== Geography ==
According to the U.S. Census Bureau, the county has a total area of 805.66 square miles (2,086.6 km^{2}), of which 798.99 square miles (2,069.4 km^{2}) is land and 6.67 square miles (17.3 km^{2}) (0.83%) is water.

=== National protected area ===
- Carolina Sandhills National Wildlife Refuge

=== State and local protected areas ===
- Angelus Wildlife Management Area
- Campbells Crossroads Wildlife Management Area
- Cheraw State Park
- H. Cooper Black Jr. Memorial Field Trial and Recreation Area
- McBee Wildlife Management Area
- Sand Hills State Forest
- Sand Hills State Forest Wildlife Management Area
- Sugarloaf Mountain Recreation Area

=== Major water bodies ===
- Black Creek
- Great Pee Dee River
- Lake Juniper
- Lake Robinson
- Little Carr Creek
- Lynches River

=== Adjacent counties ===
- Anson County, North Carolina – north
- Richmond County, North Carolina – northeast
- Union County, North Carolina – northwest
- Marlboro County – east
- Darlington County – southeast
- Kershaw County – southwest
- Lancaster County – west

=== Major highways ===
- US 1
- US 52
- US 52 Truck
- US 601
- SC 9
- SC 9 Truck
- SC 102
- SC 109
- SC 145
- SC 151
- SC 151 Bus. (Jefferson)
- SC 151 Bus. (Pageland)
- SC 207
- SC 265
- SC 268
- SC 903

=== Major infrastructure ===
- Cheraw Municipal Airport
- Pageland Airport

== Demographics ==
Historical population
Census	Pop.	Note	%±
1800	5,216		—
1810	5,564		6.7%
1820	6,645		19.4%
1830	8,472		27.5%
1840	8,574		1.2%
1850	10,790		25.8%
1860	11,834		9.7%
1870	10,584		−10.6%
1880	16,345		54.4%
1890	18,468		13.0%
1900	20,401		10.5%
1910	26,301		28.9%
1920	31,969		21.6%
1930	34,334		7.4%
1940	35,963		4.7%
1950	36,236		0.8%
1960	33,717		−7.0%
1970	33,667		−0.1%
1980	38,161		13.3%
1990	38,577		1.1%
2000	42,768		10.9%
2010	46,734		9.3%
2020	43,273		−7.4%
2025 (est.)	44,740	▲	3.4%
U.S. Decennial Census; 1790–1960 1900–1990; 1990–2000 2010 2020

=== Racial and ethnic composition ===
Chesterfield County, South Carolina – Racial and ethnic composition Note: the US Census treats Hispanic/Latino as an ethnic category. This table excludes Latinos from the racial categories and assigns them to a separate category. Hispanics/Latinos may be of any race.
Race / Ethnicity (NH = Non-Hispanic)	Pop 1980	Pop 1990	Pop 2000	Pop 2010	Pop 2020	% 1980	% 1990	% 2000	% 2010	% 2020
White alone (NH)	25,468	25,505	27,172	28,790	25,829	66.74%	66.11%	63.53%	61.60%	59.69%
Black or African American alone (NH)	12,241	12,814	14,044	15,179	13,150	32.08%	33.22%	32.84%	32.48%	30.39%
Native American or Alaska Native alone (NH)	37	63	142	223	184	0.10%	0.16%	0.33%	0.48%	0.43%
Asian alone (NH)	11	28	125	171	269	0.03%	0.07%	0.29%	0.37%	0.62%
Native Hawaiian or Pacific Islander alone (NH)	x	x	9	9	4	x	x	0.02%	0.02%	0.01%
Other race alone (NH)	0	7	21	50	118	0.00%	0.02%	0.05%	0.11%	0.27%
Mixed race or Multiracial (NH)	x	x	284	646	1,633	x	x	0.66%	1.38%	3.77%
Hispanic or Latino (any race)	404	160	971	1,666	2,086	1.06%	0.41%	2.27%	3.56%	4.82%
Total	38,161	38,577	42,768	46,734	43,273	100.00%	100.00%	100.00%	100.00%	100.00%

=== 2020 census ===
As of the 2020 census, the county had a population of 43,273, 17,538 households, and 12,399 families, with a median age of 42.9 years; 22.1% of residents were under the age of 18 and 19.4% were 65 years of age or older. For every 100 females there were 94.6 males, and for every 100 females age 18 and over there were 91.9 males age 18 and over.

Of those households, 29.3% had children under the age of 18 living with them and 32.1% had a female householder with no spouse or partner present. Individuals made up 30.1% of households and 13.8% had someone living alone who was 65 years of age or older. There were 20,408 housing units, 14.1% of which were vacant; owner-occupied units represented 72.7% of the occupied housing stock while renter-occupied units accounted for 27.3%, resulting in homeowner and rental vacancy rates of 1.7% and 10.6%, respectively.

The racial makeup was 60.5% White, 30.6% Black or African American, 0.6% American Indian and Alaska Native, 0.6% Asian, 0.0% Native Hawaiian and Pacific Islander, 2.8% from some other race, and 4.9% from two or more races; Hispanic or Latino residents of any race comprised 4.8% of the population.

16.8% of residents lived in urban areas while 83.2% lived in rural areas.

=== 2010 census ===
At the 2010 census, there were 46,734 people, 18,173 households, and 12,494 families living in the county. The population density was 58.5 inhabitants per square mile (22.6/km^{2}). There were 21,482 housing units at an average density of 26.9 per square mile (10.4/km^{2}). The racial makeup of the county was 62.8% white, 32.6% black or African American, 0.5% American Indian, 0.4% Asian, 2.0% from other races, and 1.6% from two or more races. Those of Hispanic or Latino origin made up 3.6% of the population. In terms of ancestry, 16.3% were American, 6.8% were English, 6.0% were German, and 5.9% were Irish.

Of the 18,173 households, 34.7% had children under the age of 18 living with them, 44.6% were married couples living together, 18.3% had a female householder with no husband present, 31.2% were non-families, and 27.4% of all households were made up of individuals. The average household size was 2.52 and the average family size was 3.05. The median age was 39.3 years.

The median income for a household in the county was $32,979 and the median income for a family was $41,225. Males had a median income of $35,965 versus $26,881 for females. The per capita income for the county was $17,162. About 17.6% of families and 22.7% of the population were below the poverty line, including 33.6% of those under age 18 and 18.0% of those age 65 or over.

=== 2000 census ===
At the 2000 census, there were 42,768 people, 16,557 households, and 11,705 families living in the county. The population density was 54 people per square mile (21 people/km^{2}). There were 18,818 housing units at an average density of 24 per square mile (9.3/km^{2}). The racial makeup of the county was 64.34% White, 33.22% Black or African American, 0.34% Native American, 0.30% Asian, 0.02% Pacific Islander, 1.04% from other races, and 0.75% from two or more races. 2.27% of the population were Hispanic or Latino of any race.

There were 16,557 households, out of which 33.40% had children under the age of 18 living with them, 49.60% were married couples living together, 16.30% had a female householder with no husband present, and 29.30% were non-families. 25.90% of all households were made up of individuals, and 10.00% had someone living alone who was 65 years of age or older. The average household size was 2.54 and the average family size was 3.05.

In the county, the population was spread out, with 26.60% under the age of 18, 8.50% from 18 to 24, 29.00% from 25 to 44, 23.90% from 45 to 64, and 12.00% who were 65 years of age or older. The median age was 36 years. For every 100 females there were 93.20 males. For every 100 females age 18 and over, there were 90.00 males.

The median income for a household in the county was $29,483, and the median income for a family was $36,200. Males had a median income of $30,205 versus $20,955 for females. The per capita income for the county was $14,233. About 16.70% of families and 20.30% of the population were below the poverty line, including 24.70% of those under age 18 and 24.20% of those age 65 or over.

== Law and Government ==
=== Politics ===
After the 2020 Redistricting Cycle, the South Carolina House of Representatives, Chesterfield County is located in South Carolina's 53rd, 54th, and 65th House districts and is represented by Republican Richie Yow in the 53rd, Democrat Representative Patricia Moore "Pat" Henegan in the 54th, and Republican Representative Cody Mitchell in the 65th. In the South Carolina Senate, Chesterfield is located in Senate district 27 and 29. It was represented by Democrat, and former 2010 candidate for governor, Vincent Sheheen, in District 27 until 2020. The district is now represented by Republican Penry Gustavson.

In the US House of Representatives, Chesterfield County is entirely located in South Carolina's 7th Congressional District. As of the 2022 House elections, it is represented by Republican Russell Fry, who comes from Horry County. Chesterfield County was formerly located in South Carolina's 5th Congressional District which was one of the seats that the Democrats lost to the Republicans during the 2010 election; before the 2010 election, congressman John M. Spratt had represented the district since 1983 but was defeated 55% to 45% by Republican Mick Mulvaney in 2010.

United States presidential election results for Chesterfield County, South Carolina
Year	Republican		Democratic		Third party(ies)	
Year	No.	%	No.	%	No.	%
1900	56	4.09%	1,314	95.91%	0	0.00%
1904	12	1.03%	1,158	98.97%	0	0.00%
1912	0	0.00%	1,178	99.58%	5	0.42%
1916	3	0.16%	1,883	99.63%	4	0.21%
1920	14	0.67%	2,066	99.33%	0	0.00%
1924	11	0.71%	1,539	99.23%	1	0.06%
1928	23	1.66%	1,362	98.34%	0	0.00%
1932	23	1.08%	2,109	98.92%	0	0.00%
1936	18	0.56%	3,192	99.44%	0	0.00%
1940	20	0.69%	2,880	99.31%	0	0.00%
1944	15	0.46%	3,222	98.77%	25	0.77%
1948	31	1.24%	912	36.51%	1,555	62.25%
1952	1,776	27.56%	4,668	72.44%	0	0.00%
1956	795	15.94%	3,559	71.35%	634	12.71%
1960	1,372	23.57%	4,450	76.43%	0	0.00%
1964	2,449	34.58%	4,634	65.42%	0	0.00%
1968	2,564	25.47%	3,180	31.59%	4,324	42.95%
1972	5,230	63.56%	2,938	35.70%	61	0.74%
1976	2,537	24.77%	7,687	75.04%	20	0.20%
1980	3,478	34.88%	6,393	64.11%	101	1.01%
1984	5,451	54.15%	4,593	45.62%	23	0.23%
1988	4,999	51.35%	4,699	48.27%	37	0.38%
1992	4,183	37.31%	5,691	50.76%	1,338	11.93%
1996	4,028	38.11%	5,734	54.25%	807	7.64%
2000	6,266	50.02%	6,111	48.79%	149	1.19%
2004	7,252	51.62%	6,729	47.90%	68	0.48%
2008	8,325	50.89%	7,842	47.94%	192	1.17%
2012	8,490	51.16%	7,958	47.96%	146	0.88%
2016	9,312	56.16%	6,858	41.36%	411	2.48%
2020	11,297	59.85%	7,431	39.37%	148	0.78%
2024	11,682	63.52%	6,520	35.45%	189	1.03%

=== Law enforcement ===
As of 2023, the current sheriff is Cambo Streater. In 2014, Sheriff Sam Parker was found guilty of charges that he used inmates for personal work and provided them contraband such as alcohol and an iPad. He was sentenced to two years of prison.

== Economy ==
In 2022, the GDP of Chesterfield County was $1.7 billion (about $38,443 per capita). This is a real GDP of $1.4 billion (approx. $31,029 per capita) in chained 2017 dollars. In 2022 through 2024, the unemployment rate has fluctuated between 2-4.5%.

As of April 2024, some of the top employers in the county include Black+Decker, Chesterfield County School District, Crown Holdings, McLeod Health, Northeastern Technical College, and Walmart.

Employment and Wage Statistics by Industry in Chesterfield County, South Carolina
Industry	Employment Counts	Employment Percentage (%)	Average Annual Wage ($)
Accommodation and Food Services	974	7.3	15,652
Administrative and Support and Waste Management and Remediation Services	584	4.4	49,868
Agriculture, Forestry, Fishing and Hunting	292	2.2	41,236
Arts, Entertainment, and Recreation	36	0.3	21,320
Construction	510	3.8	40,560
Finance and Insurance	186	1.4	51,688
Health Care and Social Assistance	1,401	10.5	49,244
Information	149	1.1	60,372
Manufacturing	4,786	35.8	56,888
Mining, Quarrying, and Oil and Gas Extraction	96	0.7	66,924
Other Services (except Public Administration)	226	1.7	38,324
Professional, Scientific, and Technical Services	132	1.0	45,448
Public Administration	630	4.7	38,636
Real Estate and Rental and Leasing	46	0.3	37,544
Retail Trade	1,232	9.2	28,340
Transportation and Warehousing	1,655	12.4	55,796
Utilities	117	0.9	69,160
Wholesale Trade	300	2.2	56,108
Total	13,352	100.0%	47,713

== Education ==
The county's youth are educated through the Chesterfield County School District. The South Point Christian School is a private school in Pageland that offers Kindergarten through 12th grade.

Northeastern Technical College has branches in Pageland and Cheraw.

=== High schools ===
- Central High School, Pageland
- Cheraw High School, Cheraw
- Chesterfield High School, Chesterfield
- McBee High School, McBee

=== Middle schools ===
- Chesterfield/Ruby Middle School, Chesterfield/Ruby
- Long Middle School, Cheraw
- New Heights Middle School, Jefferson

=== Elementary schools ===
- Cheraw Intermediate School, Cheraw
- Edwards Elementary School, Chesterfield
- Jefferson Elementary School, Jefferson
- McBee Elementary School, McBee
- Pageland Elementary School, Pageland
- Plainview Elementary School, Plainview
- Ruby Elementary School, Ruby

=== Primary schools ===
- Cheraw Primary School, Cheraw
- Petersburg Primary School, Pageland

== Culture ==
Chesterfield County supports several fine arts organizations ranging from High School Marching Bands to community theatres to municipal arts commissions.

- The Central High Sound of Central
- The Cheraw Tribe Marching Band
- The Chesterfield Marching Pride
- The Spirit of McBee High Marching Band
- The Cheraw Arts Commission
- The Chesterfield Arts Commission

== Recreation ==
Chesterfield County features many different types of recreation. Although each town varies in its offerings, facilities such as baseball and softball fields, walking tracks, parks, and other outdoor areas are common throughout the area. Golf is extremely popular and many local courses are frequented by visitors from throughout the region. There is a lot of hunting and fishing in the swamps of the Black Creek and Lake Robinson.

== Communities ==
=== Towns ===
- Cheraw (largest community; partly in Marlboro County)
- Chesterfield (county seat)
- Jefferson
- McBee
- Mount Croghan
- Pageland
- Patrick
- Ruby

=== Census-designated place ===
- Cash

=== Unincorporated communities ===
- Angelus
- Middendorf
- Minden

== See also ==
- List of counties in South Carolina
- National Register of Historic Places listings in Chesterfield County, South Carolina
- USS Chesterfield County (LST-551)
