= North Carolina Highway 207 =

State highway in Union County, North Carolina, US

North Carolina Highway 207
- Wolf Pond Road

Route information
- Maintained by NCDOT
- Length: 13.0 mi (20.9 km)
- Existed: 1948–present

Major junctions
- South end: SC 207 at the South Carolina state line near Pageland, SC
- North end: US 74 / US 601 / NC 200 in Monroe

Location
- Country: United States
- State: North Carolina
- Counties: Union

Highway system
- North Carolina Highway System; Interstate; US; State; Scenic
← NC 205	→ NC 208

North Carolina Highway 207 (NC 207) is a primary state highway in the U.S. state of North Carolina. It is entirely in the boundaries of Union County and serves to connect the city of Monroe to the city of Pageland, South Carolina, at the South Carolina state line via SC 207.

== Route description ==
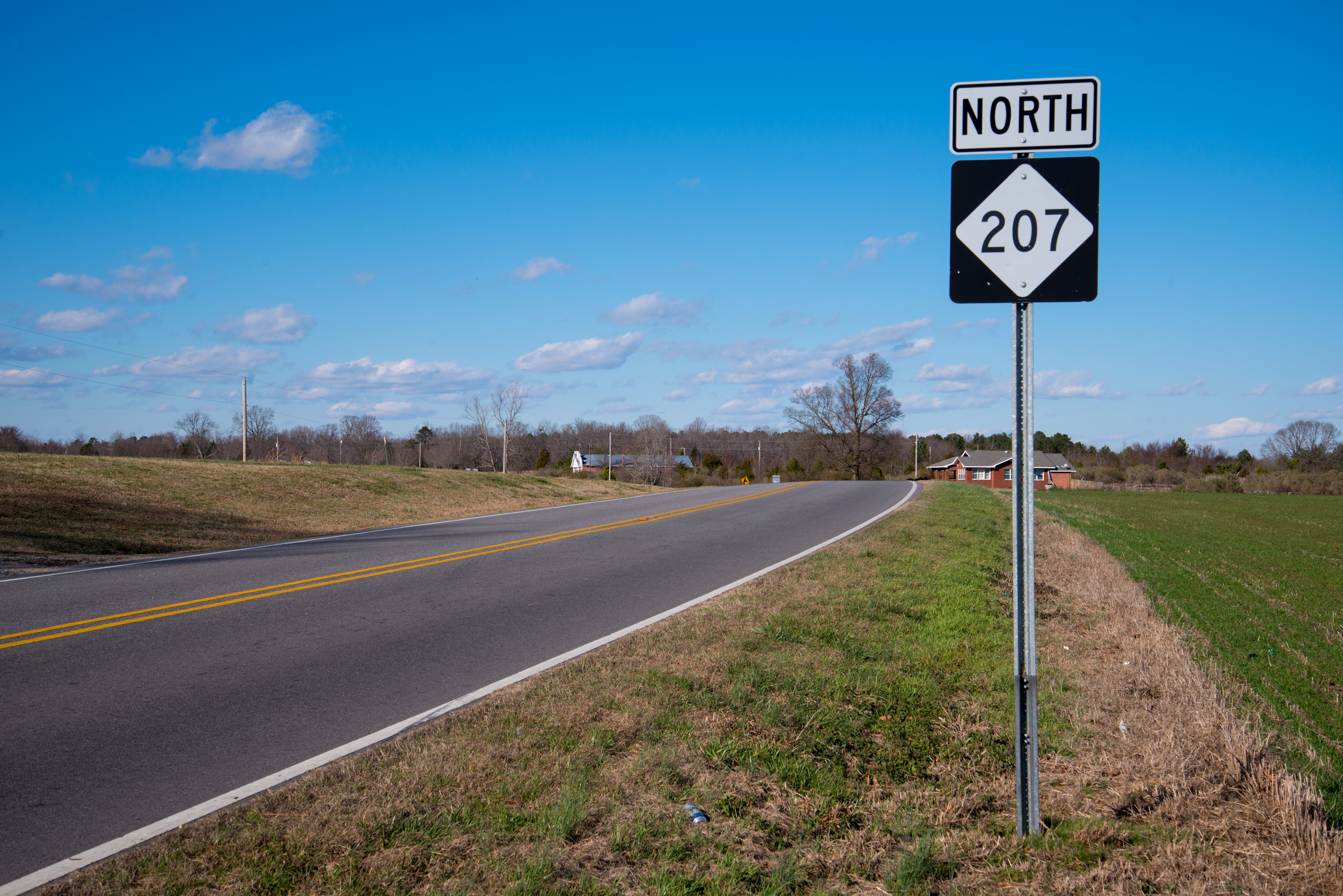
First sign for NC 207 after state line

From the North Carolina-South Carolina state line, NC 207 is a two-lane rural highway traversing north through rolling hills of farmland. Once it enters Monroe city limits, it becomes Haynes Street, where it connects several neighborhoods until it reaches the downtown business district. At Franklin Street, the road widens to four-lanes. At Church Street, it becomes Skyway Drive, continuing over the CSX rail yard it continue due north till it reaches Roosevelt Boulevard, where NC 207 ends at an interchange with US 74, US 601, and NC 200. Outside Monroe city limits, it is known and labeled as Wolf Pond Road.

== History ==
The second and current NC 207 was established in 1948 as a new primary route from the South Carolina state line to US 74/NC 151/NC 200 (Franklin Street) in Monroe. The highway is a continuation of SC 207, which predates it. Between 1958-62, NC 207 was truncated at Morrow Street; and then was extended to Church Street between 1969 and 1982. In August 2011, NC 207 was extended along Skyway Drive to US 74/US 601/NC 200 (Roosevelt Boulevard), after NC 200 was relocated bypassing west of Monroe.

The first NC 207 was created in 1926 as a short route from Forest City south to the South Carolina state line near Chesnee, South Carolina. This route was originally numbered as NC 206 but was changed by the North Carolina Department of Transportation for reasons unknown. Before being eliminated in 1933 with many other state routes, US 221 was selected to cover its span. This span was later re-signed as US 221A when a newer, more direct route was constructed bypassing Forest City and Spindale.

== Junction list ==
The entire route is in Union County.

Location	mi	km	Destinations	Notes
	0.0	0.0	SC 207 south	South Carolina state line
Monroe	13.0	20.9	US 74 / US 601 / NC 200 (Roosevelt Boulevard) – Charlotte, Wadesboro, Pageland, Concord	Interchange
1.000 mi = 1.609 km; 1.000 km = 0.621 mi
