= Pageland Airport =

- IATA: none; ICAO: KPYG; FAA LID: PYG

Summary
- Airport type: Public
- Owner: City & Town of Pageland
- Serves: Pageland, South Carolina
- Elevation AMSL: 575 ft / 175 m
- Coordinates: 34°44′31″N 080°20′42″W
- Interactive map of Pageland Airport

Runways
Direction	Length		Surface
Direction	ft	m	Surface
6/24	3,396	1,035	Asphalt

Statistics (2015)
- Aircraft operations: 2,464
- Based aircraft: 12
- Source: Federal Aviation Administration

Pageland Airport (IATA: KPYG, ICAO: PYG) is a public use airport located three nautical miles (5 km) southeast of the central business district of Pageland, a city in Chesterfield County, South Carolina, United States. It is owned by the Town of Pageland.

== Facilities and aircraft ==
Sumter Airport covers an area of 20 acres (8.1 ha) at an elevation of 575 feet (175 m) above mean sea level. It has two runways: 6/24 is 3,396 by 60 feet (1,035 x 18 m) with an asphalt surface.

For the 12-month period ending December 15, 2015, the airport had 48,300 aircraft operations, an average of 132 per day: 100% general aviation. At that time there were 12 aircraft based at this airport: 11 single-engine and 1 multi-engine.

== See also ==
- List of airports in South Carolina
