= South Carolina Highway 207 =

State highway in South Carolina, United States

South Carolina Highway 207

Route information
- Maintained by SCDOT
- Length: 9.168 mi (14.754 km)
- Existed: 1949–present

Major junctions
- South end: US 601 / SC 9 in Pageland
- North end: NC 207 at the North Carolina state line near Pageland

Location
- Country: United States
- State: South Carolina
- Counties: Chesterfield

Highway system
- South Carolina State Highway System; Interstate; US; State; Scenic
← SC 203	→ SC 210

South Carolina Highway 207 (SC 207) is a 9.168-mile (14.754 km) primary state highway in the state of South Carolina. It is entirely within the boundaries of Chesterfield County and serves to connect the city of Pageland, South Carolina to the city of Monroe, North Carolina via North Carolina Highway 207 (NC 207).

== Route description ==
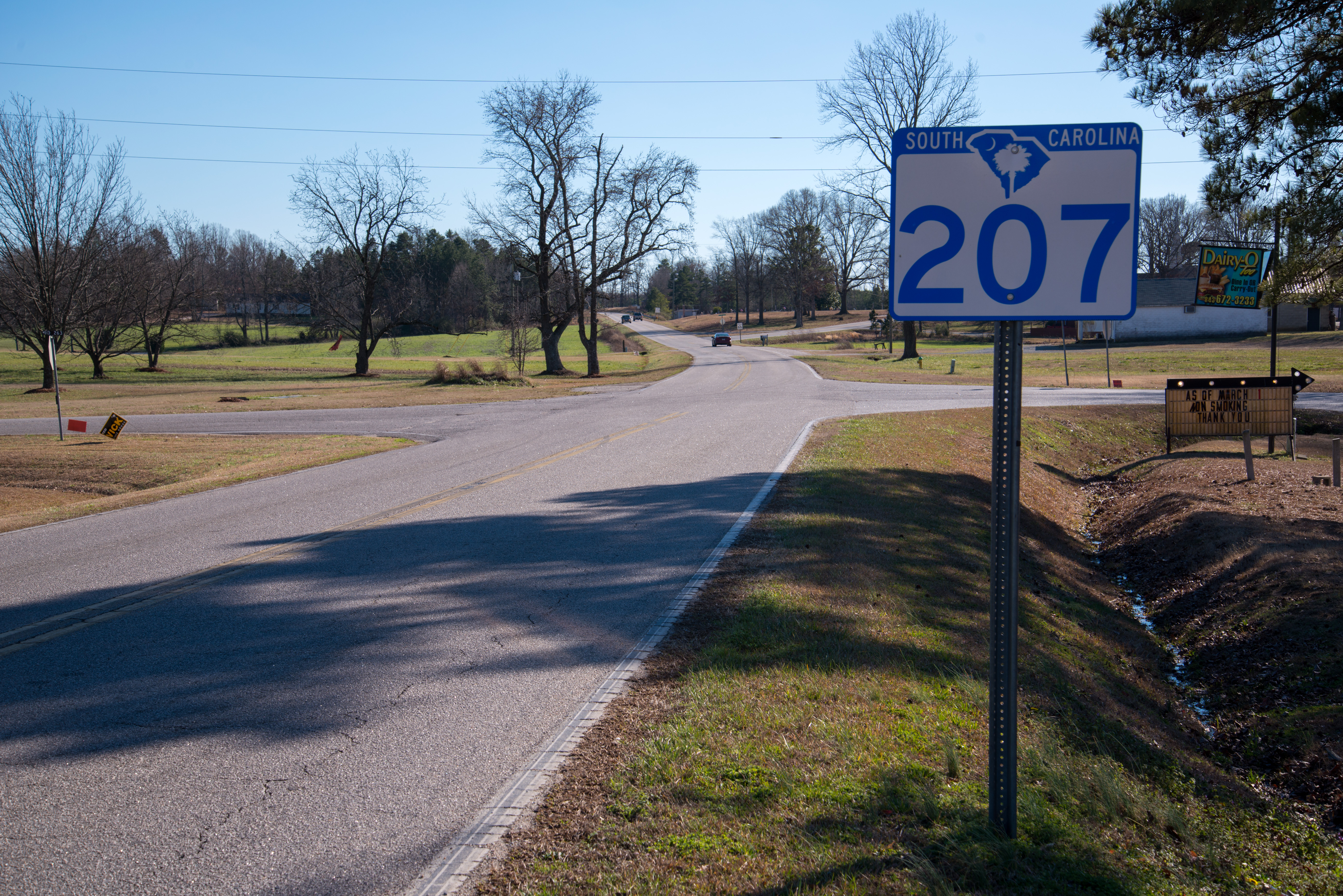
First sign for SC 207 after state line

Starting at the intersection of Elm Street and McGregor Street (U.S. Route 601 (US 601) and SC 9), it travels northwest for 9.2 miles (14.8 km) to the North Carolina state line, where it continues on as NC 207 towards Monroe. The entire route is two lanes and travels through mostly farmland.

== History ==
The road was originally established in 1940 as a new primary route from Pageland to the North Carolina state line (exactly as it is today). By 1942, it was extended southeast to SC 151. In 1948, it was decommissioned, but was recommissioned in 1949 after NC 207 was established.

== Junction list ==
The entire route is in Chesterfield County.

Location	mi	km	Destinations	Notes
Pageland	0.000	0.000	US 601 / SC 9 (McGregor Street) / South Elm Street – Chesterfield, Lancaster	Southern terminus
	9.168	14.754	NC 207 north (Wolf Pond Road) – Monroe	Continuation into North Carolina
1.000 mi = 1.609 km; 1.000 km = 0.621 mi
