= USS Chesterfield County =

Tank landing ship

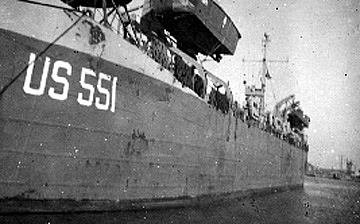
- LST-551

History

United States
- Name: USS LST-551, later USS Chesterfield County
- Namesake: Chesterfield County, South Carolina, and Chesterfield County, Virginia,
- Builder: Missouri Valley Bridge and Iron Company, Evansville, Indiana
- Laid down: 15 January 1944
- Launched: 11 March 1944
- Sponsored by: Mrs. H. Edward Lannan
- Commissioned: 14 April 1944
- Decommissioned: 10 June 1955
- Renamed: USS Chesterfield County (LST-551), 1 July 1955
- Recommissioned: 21 December 1965
- Stricken: 1 June 1970
- Honours and awards: 1 battle star for World War II; 2 campaign stars for the Vietnam War
- Fate: Sold for scrapping, February 1971

General characteristics
- Class & type: LST-542-class tank landing ship
- Displacement: 1,780 long tons (1,809 t) light; 3,640 long tons (3,698 t) full
- Length: 328 ft (100 m)
- Beam: 50 ft (15 m)
- Draft: Unloaded : 2 ft 4 in (0.71 m) forward; 7 ft 6 in (2.29 m) aft; Loaded : 8 ft 2 in (2.49 m) forward; 14 ft 1 in (4.29 m) aft
- Propulsion: 2 × General Motors 12-567 diesel engines, two shafts, twin rudders
- Speed: 12 knots (22 km/h; 14 mph)
- Boats & landing craft carried: 2 LCVPs
- Troops: Approximately 140 officers and enlisted men
- Complement: 8-10 officers, 100-115 enlisted men
- Armament: 1 × single 3-inch/50-caliber gun mount; 8 × 40 mm guns; 12 × 20 mm guns

USS Chesterfield County (LST-551), originally USS LST-551, was an LST-542-class tank landing ship built for the United States Navy during World War II and in commission from 1944 to 1955 and again in the late 1960s. Named after Chesterfield County, South Carolina, and Chesterfield County, Virginia, she has been the only U.S. Navy vessel to bear the name.

== Construction and commissioning ==
LST-551 was laid down on 15 January 1944 at Evansville, Indiana, by the Missouri Valley Bridge and Iron Company. She was launched on 11 March 1944, sponsored by Mrs. H. Edward Lannan, and commissioned on 14 April 1944.

== Service history, 1944–1955 ==
During World War II, LST-551 was assigned to the European Theater of Operations and participated in the Operation Dragoon the invasion of southern France, in August and September 1944. Following the war, LST-551 performed occupation service in Europe until early July 1945. She then served with Amphibious Force, United States Atlantic Fleet, until she was decommissioned on 10 June 1955.

While out of commission, LST-551 was renamed USS Chesterfield County (LST-551) on 1 July 1955.

== Service history, 1960s ==
Chesterfield County was recommissioned on 21 December 1965 and operated on the Brown Waters Vietnam in 1966 and 1967 during the Vietnam War. Decommissioned once again in 1968, she was struck from the Naval Vessel Register on 1 June 1970 and sold to Mitsui and Company of Japan in February 1971 for scrapping.

== Awards and honors ==
LST-551 earned one battle star for World War II service and Chesterfield County earned two battle stars for Vietnam War service.

== See also ==
- List of United States Navy LSTs
- Chesterfield County, South Carolina
- Chesterfield County, Virginia
