= Cheraw Historic District =

Historic district in South Carolina, United States

- U.S. National Register of Historic Places
- U.S. Historic district
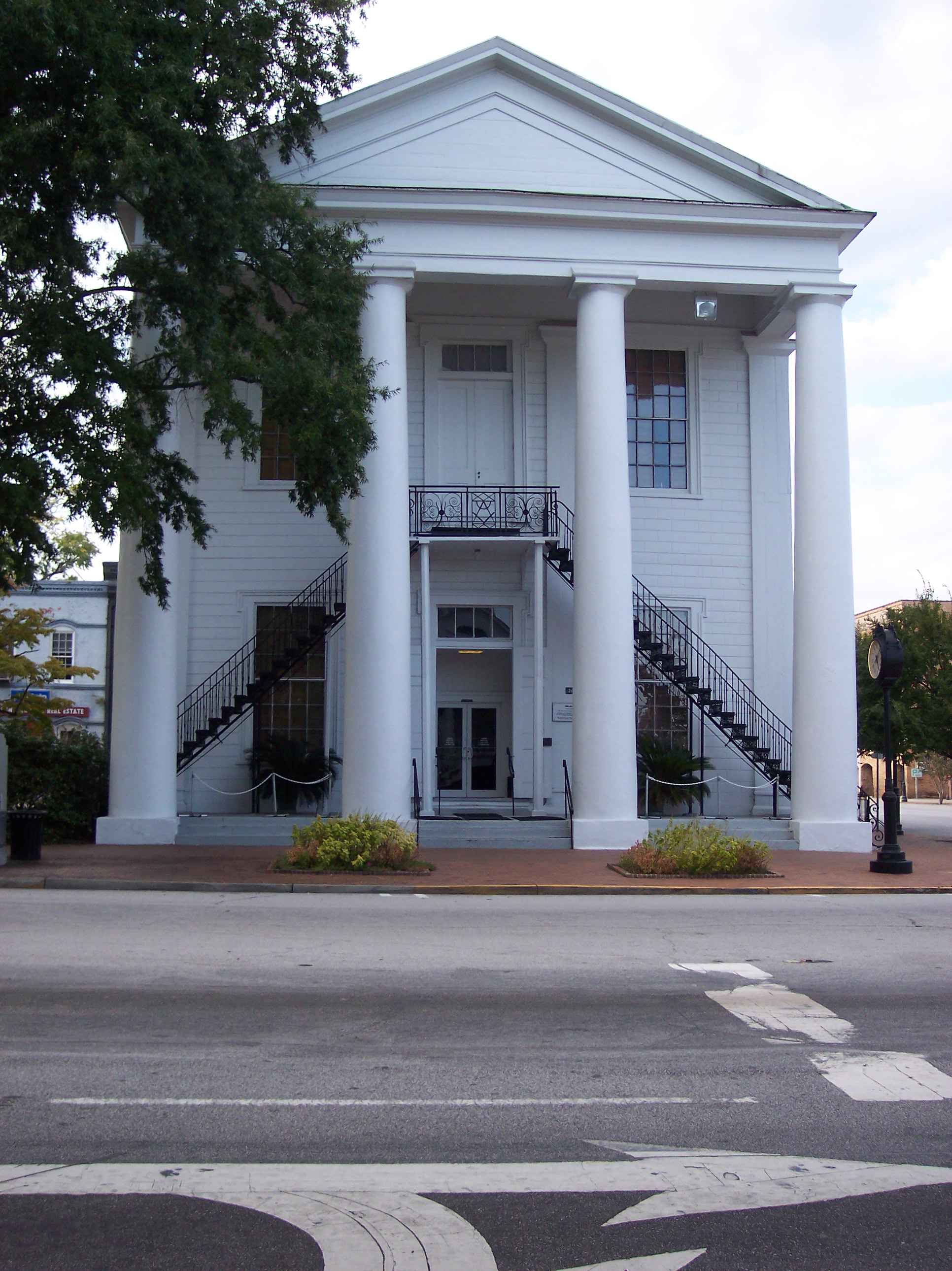
- Cheraw Town Hall, Cheraw Historic District, September 2006

- Location within South Carolina Location within the United States
- Location: Bounded by Front, Kershaw, 3rd, McIver, Cedar, Greene, Christian, and Church Sts., Cheraw, South Carolina
- Coordinates: 34°41′50″N 79°53′15″W
- Area: 600 acres (240 ha)
- Built: 1865
- Architectural style: Mixed (more Than 2 Styles From Different Periods)
- NRHP reference No.: 74001844
- Added to NRHP: November 20, 1974

Cheraw Historic District is a national historic district located at Cheraw, Chesterfield County, South Carolina. The district encompasses 39 contributing buildings and 1 contributing object in Cheraw. Located within the district are varieties of architectural styles that include the early frame homes of the 1800s (often called upcountry farmhouses, or essentially I-House in type), antebellum structures with Classical Revival details and Greek Revival porticos, and Victorian houses from the turn of the 20th century. The district also includes several churches, a cemetery, and the towns’ original boundary markers dating from 1766. Notable buildings include Town Hall, First Presbyterian Church, St. Peter's Catholic Church, Chicola Club / Brady's Restaurant, First Federal Savings, Robert Smalls, Dizzy Gillespie and Loan, B.C. Moore and Sons, Coulter Memorial Academy Building, and Godfrey House. Located in the district is the separately listed St. David's Episcopal Church and Cemetery.

It was listed on the National Register of Historic Places in 1974.
