= Chesterfield High School (South Carolina) =

Location
- 401 North Page Street; Chesterfield, South Carolina 29709; United States

Information
- School district: Chesterfield County School District
- Principal: Neil Adams
- Staff: 33.00 (FTE)
- Grades: 9–12
- Enrollment: 501 (2023-2024)
- Student to teacher ratio: 15.18
- Colors: Blue and gold
- Team name: Rams
- Website: cfh.chesterfieldschools.org

Chesterfield High School is a public high school in Chesterfield, South Carolina, United States, serving students from ninth through twelfth grades for the towns of Chesterfield, Mount Croghan, and Ruby. Many students also attend from other attendance areas, namely Cheraw, Pageland, and Anson County, North Carolina due to the quality of the Chesterfield-Ruby schools. The current Chesterfield High School opened in 1969 following the consolidation of the original Chesterfield High School (which served white students), Gary High School (which served African-American students), and Ruby High School.

== Programs ==
=== Athletics ===
Chesterfield High has won six wrestling state championships, and finished as state runners-up twice, in 2006 and 2011.

Chesterfield also won the 2007, 2008, and 2009 1A Football State Championship and were runners-up in 2006. The school's rival is Cheraw High School and Central High School in Pageland.

The Rams track & field team has been state runner-up several times, and cross country has won several regional championships across the 1A and 2A divisions.

The Lady Rams softball team has won the Class 1A State Championship three times (2008, 2010, 2012). And in 2023, they won the Class AA state championship. Prior to integration, the original Chesterfield High won state championships in baseball (1962 Class 1A). After runner up finishes in 2008 and 2009, the baseball team won the Class 1A State Championship in 2011.

The school also has state runner-up finishes in boys' track and field (2003 Class 2A), boys' golf (2007 Class 1A), and competitive cheerleading (2007 Class 2A).

The girls' basketball team won state championship (1961 Class 1A) and had a runner-up finish (1959 Class 1A).

=== Band ===
The band won their first SCBDA 1A-3A State Championship in 2014 and placed second in 2015 and 2017.

== 2008 bomb incident ==
In 2008, the report of a student plotting to bomb Chesterfield High School was caught before the plan was set into motion.

== Notable alumni ==
- Beth Kennett, politician
