= H. Cooper Black Jr. Memorial Field Trial and Recreation Area =

- Interactive map of H. Cooper Black Jr. Memorial Field Trial and Recreation Area
- Nearest city: Cheraw, SC
- Coordinates: 34°33′59″N 79°55′29″W
- Area: 7,000 acres (28 km^{2})
- Open: 1994
- Camp sites: tent and RV sites

H. Cooper Black Jr. Memorial Field Trial and Recreation Area is a state park located near the town of Cheraw in Chesterfield County, South Carolina. It is the only South Carolina state park available for field trials and retriever competitions. The park was created on land originally part of Sand Hills State Forest in memory of Dr. H. Cooper Black, Jr, of Columbia after his death in 1993.

== Activities and amenities ==
Activities available at the park include picnicking, fishing, camping and hunting in-season.

Amenities include a meeting hall, waterfowl ponds, playground and a picnic shelter. 4 ponds and 2 fields (Boykin and Palmetto) are available for rent for the use of retriever training.

Equestrian facilities including stables, kennels, corrals, a show ring and arenas along with 40 miles of equestrian trails and 30 miles of sand roads can also be found at the park.

Unlike other state parks, this one can be closed to the general public during special events and one should contact the park before planning a trip to ensure it is open.
