= Beth Kennett =

American politician (born 1964)

Mayor of Burlington, North Carolina
- Incumbent
- Assumed office January 7, 2026
- Preceded by: James B. Butler

Personal details
- Born: July 25, 1964 (age 62) Monroe, North Carolina, U.S.
- Party: Democratic Party
- Spouse: Jay Kennett
- Children: 2
- Education: Gardner–Webb College (BA); Southern Baptist Theological Seminary (MDiv)
- Occupation: politician healthcare administrator minister
- Website: Mayor's Website

Elizabeth "Beth" Kennett (born July 25, 1964) is an American politician. On November 4, 2025, she was elected as the first woman mayor of Burlington, North Carolina.

== Early life and education ==
Kennett was born on July 25, 1964 in Monroe, North Carolina. She graduated from Chesterfield High School in Chesterfield, South Carolina in 1982. She earned a bachelor of arts degree in music education and flute performance from Gardner–Webb College in 1986 and a master of divinity degree from the Southern Baptist Theological Seminary in 1989.

== Career ==
Kennett is an ordained minister in the United Church of Christ. She works as the director of Center for Congregational Health at Atrium Health Wake Forest Baptist.

=== Politics ===
Kennett is a Democrat and has been a member of the Alamance County Democratic Party since 2006. In 2008, she unsuccessfully ran for a seat on the Alamance Burlington Board of Education. She unsuccessfully ran for mayor of Burlington, North Carolina in 2023 against James B. Butler. In 2024, she was appointed to the Burlington Traffic Commission. She won the mayoral election in Burlington on November 4, 2025, defeating Republican former mayor and city councilman Ronnie Keith Wall. She received 4,237 votes while Wall received 3,640. Kennett is the first woman to win a mayoral election in Burlington.

== Personal life ==
She is married to Jay Kennett and has two children, Abi and Emma.

Kennett is a member of Impact Alamance Community Engagement, Down Home NC, We Are Down Home Alamance, and the Morrowtown Community Garden.
