= South Carolina Highway 151 =

State highway in South Carolina

South Carolina Highway 151
- Bobo Newsom Highway

Route information
- Maintained by SCDOT
- Length: 52.850 mi (85.054 km)
- Existed: 1937–present

Major junctions
- South end: US 52 Bus. / SC 34 in Darlington
- US 52 / US 401 in Darlington; US 15 in Hartsville; US 1 in McBee
- North end: US 601 / SC 151 Bus. in Pageland

Location
- Country: United States
- State: South Carolina
- Counties: Darlington, Chesterfield

Highway system
- South Carolina State Highway System; Interstate; US; State; Scenic
← SC 150	→ SC 153

South Carolina Highway 151 (SC 151) is a 52.850-mile (85.054 km) primary state highway in the U.S. state of South Carolina. Known as "the road to the beach" by many residents of the Charlotte metropolitan area due to it being the most direct route to the Grand Strand, it connects the Charlotte metropolitan area to Darlington, Florence, and the aforementioned Grand Strand.

== Route description ==
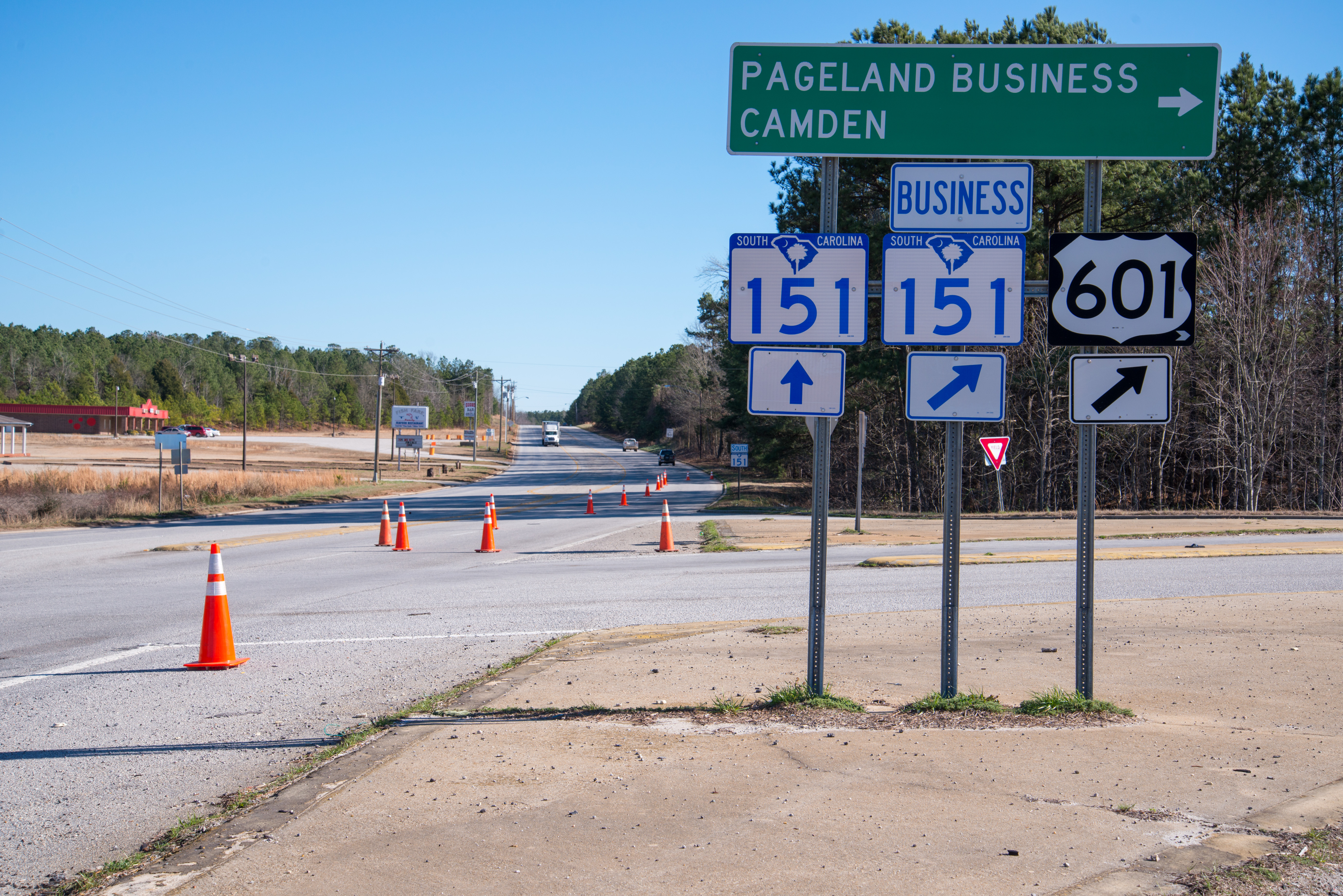
SC 151 bypasses Pageland, while US 601/SC 151 Bus takes right into town

SC 151 is a four-lane and mostly divided highway from Darlington to Pageland. For several segments, the road is five lanes, with four travel lanes and a center turn lane.

SC 151 starts in Pageland, splitting off from US 601 to bypass the town's business district. Heading southward, it also bypasses Jefferson, heads through downtown McBee, and bypasses Hartsville. In downtown McBee, the speed limit is 25 MPH, and on several segments of the route, the limit is 60 MPH. Past McBee, the route takes on a more east-west direction, which it maintains until its southern terminus in Darlington.

== History ==
The first SC 151 was established in 1927 as a new primary routing between U.S. Route 29 (US 29)/SC 15 in Anderson, to SC 20 in Williamston. By 1930, it was renumbered as SC 248.

The current SC 151 was established in 1937 as a renumbering of SC 35 from Darlington to the North Carolina state line. By 1952, SC 151 was truncated at SC 9 in Pageland, its route north to the state line replaced by US 601. By 1958, SC 151 replaced SC 151 Alternate (SC 151 Alt.), bypassing Hartsville. In 1983, SC 151 was extended and bypassed east of Pageland, to its current northern terminus. In 1997, SC 151 was bypassed east of Jefferson.

=== South Carolina Highway 35 ===
South Carolina Highway 35
- Location: Darlington–Pageland, South Carolina
- Existed: 1922–1938

South Carolina Highway 35 (SC 35) was an original state highway that was established at least as early as 1922 from SC 41 (now US 52 Bus.) in Darlington, through Hartsville, to SC 50 (now US 1) in McBee. In 1923, it was extended through Jefferson to SC 9 in Pageland. By the end of 1926, it was extended again to the North Carolina state line, at a point north-northwest of Pageland. In 1938, it was decommissioned and redesignated as SC 151.

== Major intersections ==
County	Location	mi	km	Destinations	Notes
Darlington	Darlington	0.000	0.000	US 52 Bus. (Main Street) / SC 34 east (Pearl Street) – Bennettsville, Cheraw, Dillon, Latta	Southern end of SC 34 concurrency; southern terminus
Darlington	Darlington	0.610	0.982	SC 340 south (Washington Street) – Timmonsville	Northern terminus of SC 340
Darlington	Darlington	0.970	1.561	Lamar Highway south (SC 34 Conn. west) to I-20 / US 401 – Sumter	Eastern terminus of SC 34 Conn.
Darlington	Darlington	1.400	2.253	US 52 / US 401 (Governor Williams Highway) to SC 34 Truck east / I-20 / I-95 – Cheraw, Florence, Myrtle Beach	Interchange; western terminus of SC 34 Truck
Darlington	Earlys Crossroads	6.660	10.718	SC 34 west (Lydia Highway) – Bishopville	Northern end of SC 34 concurrency
Darlington		10.440	16.802	SC 151 Bus. north (Fourth Street) – Hartsville	Southern terminus of SC 151 Bus.
Darlington	Hartsville	12.410	19.972	US 15 (Fifth Street) – Bishopville, Hartsville	
Darlington	Hartsville	16.480	26.522	SC 151 Bus. south (Carolina Avenue) – Hartsville	Northern terminus of SC 151 Bus.
Chesterfield	McBee	26.790	43.114	US 1 – Camden, Cheraw	
Chesterfield	Catarrh	36.530	58.789	SC 903 north (McBee Highway) – Lancaster	Southern terminus of SC 903
Chesterfield	Jefferson	41.370	66.579	SC 151 Bus. north (Main Street) – Jefferson	Southern terminus of SC 151 Bus.
Chesterfield	Jefferson	42.810	68.896	SC 265 – Chesterfield	
Chesterfield		44.580	71.745	SC 151 Bus. south (Main Street) – Jefferson	Northern terminus of SC 151 Bus.
Chesterfield		49.270	79.292	SC 151 Bus. north (Pearl Street) – Pageland	Southern terminus of SC 151 Bus.
Chesterfield	Pageland	51.600	83.042	SC 9 (McGregor Street) – Lancaster, Chesterfield, North Myrtle Beach	
Chesterfield	Pageland	52.850	85.054	US 601 / SC 151 Bus. south (Pearl Street) – Pageland, Monroe	Northern terminus of SC 151 and SC 151 Bus.
1.000 mi = 1.609 km; 1.000 km = 0.621 mi: Concurrency terminus

== Special routes ==
=== Hartsville alternate route ===
South Carolina Highway 151 Alternate
- Location: Hartsville, South Carolina
- Length: 7.4 mi (11.9 km)
- Existed: 1954–c.1972

South Carolina Highway 151 Alternate (SC 151 Alt.) was an alternate route established in 1954 as a new primary route bypassing south of Hartsville. In 1972 or 1973, it was renumbered as SC 151 Business.

=== Hartsville business loop ===
South Carolina Highway 151 Business
- Location: Hartsville, South Carolina
- Length: 7.540 mi (12.134 km)
- Existed: 1958–present

South Carolina Highway 151 Business (SC 151 Bus.) is a 7.540-mile (12.134 km) business route that travels through downtown Hartsville. It was established by 1958 as a renumbering of mainline SC 151. It follows Fourth Street and Carolina Avenue.

The entire route is in Darlington County.

Location	mi	km	Destinations	Notes
	0.000	0.000	SC 151 – Darlington	Southern terminus
Hartsville	2.420	3.895	US 15 (Marquis Highway) – Bishopville, Bennettsville	Interchange
Hartsville	4.070	6.550	US 15 Bus. (Fifth Street) – Bishopville, Bennettsville	
Hartsville	7.540	12.134	SC 151 – McBee	Northern terminus
1.000 mi = 1.609 km; 1.000 km = 0.621 mi

=== Jefferson business loop ===
South Carolina Highway 151 Business
- Location: Jefferson, South Carolina
- Length: 3.190 mi (5.134 km)
- Existed: 1997–present

South Carolina Highway 151 Business (SC 151 Bus.) is a 3.190-mile (5.134 km) business route that follows Main Street through downtown Jefferson. It was established by 1997 as a renumbering of mainline SC 151.

The entire route is in Chesterfield County.

Location	mi	km	Destinations	Notes
Jefferson	0.000	0.000	SC 151 – McBee	Southern terminus
Jefferson	1.660	2.672	SC 265 – Kershaw, Chesterfield	
	3.190	5.134	SC 151 – Pageland	Northern terminus
1.000 mi = 1.609 km; 1.000 km = 0.621 mi

=== Pageland business loop ===
South Carolina Highway 151 Business
- Location: Pageland, South Carolina
- Length: 3.030 mi (4.876 km)
- Existed: 1983–present

South Carolina Highway 151 Business (SC 151 Bus.) is a 3.030-mile (4.876 km) business route that travels through downtown Pageland via Pearl Street. It also has a concurrency with U.S. Route 601 (US 601). It was established in 1983 as renumbering of mainline SC 151.

The entire route is in Chesterfield County.

Location	mi	km	Destinations	Notes
	0.000	0.000	SC 151 – Jefferson	Southern terminus
Pageland	1.940	3.122	US 601 south / SC 9 – Chesterfield, Lancaster	Southern end of US 601 concurrency
Pageland	3.030	4.876	US 601 north / SC 151 south – Monroe, Charlotte	Northern end of US 601 concurrency; northern terminus
1.000 mi = 1.609 km; 1.000 km = 0.621 mi
