= Northeastern Technical College =

College in Cheraw, South Carolina, U.S.

- Type: Public community college
- Parent institution: South Carolina Technical College System
- President: Kyle Wagner
- Students: 1,466
- Location: Cheraw, South Carolina, United States; 34.6992°N 79.9388°W
- Nickname: Trailblazers
- Website: www.netc.edu
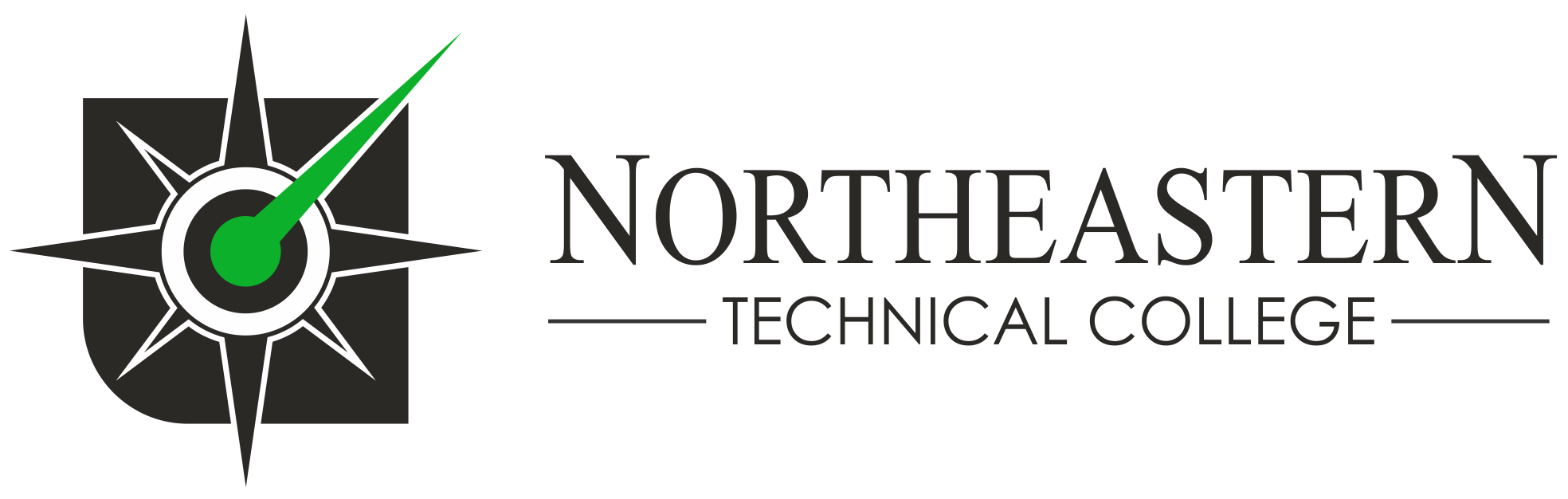

Northeastern Technical College is a public community college in Cheraw, South Carolina with branches in Pageland, Dillon, and Bennettsville. The college primarily serves Chesterfield, Marlboro, and Dillon counties. It is part of the South Carolina Technical College System.

Northeastern Technical College is accredited by the Commission on Colleges of the Southern Association of Colleges and Schools to award associate degrees, diplomas, and certificates. As with many other 2-year institutions, Northeastern offers transfer programs to multiple Universities in South Carolina including Francis Marion University, University of South Carolina, Clemson University, Coker College, Lander University, South Carolina State University, Winthrop University and Kaplan College

== Demographics ==
Northeastern Technical College has 894 enrolled students as of Spring semester 2017. The campus is diverse; 54% of students are White/Non-Hispanic, 43% are Black/Non-Hispanic, 1% are Native American and 1% are Asian.
