= Jefferson, South Carolina =

- Town
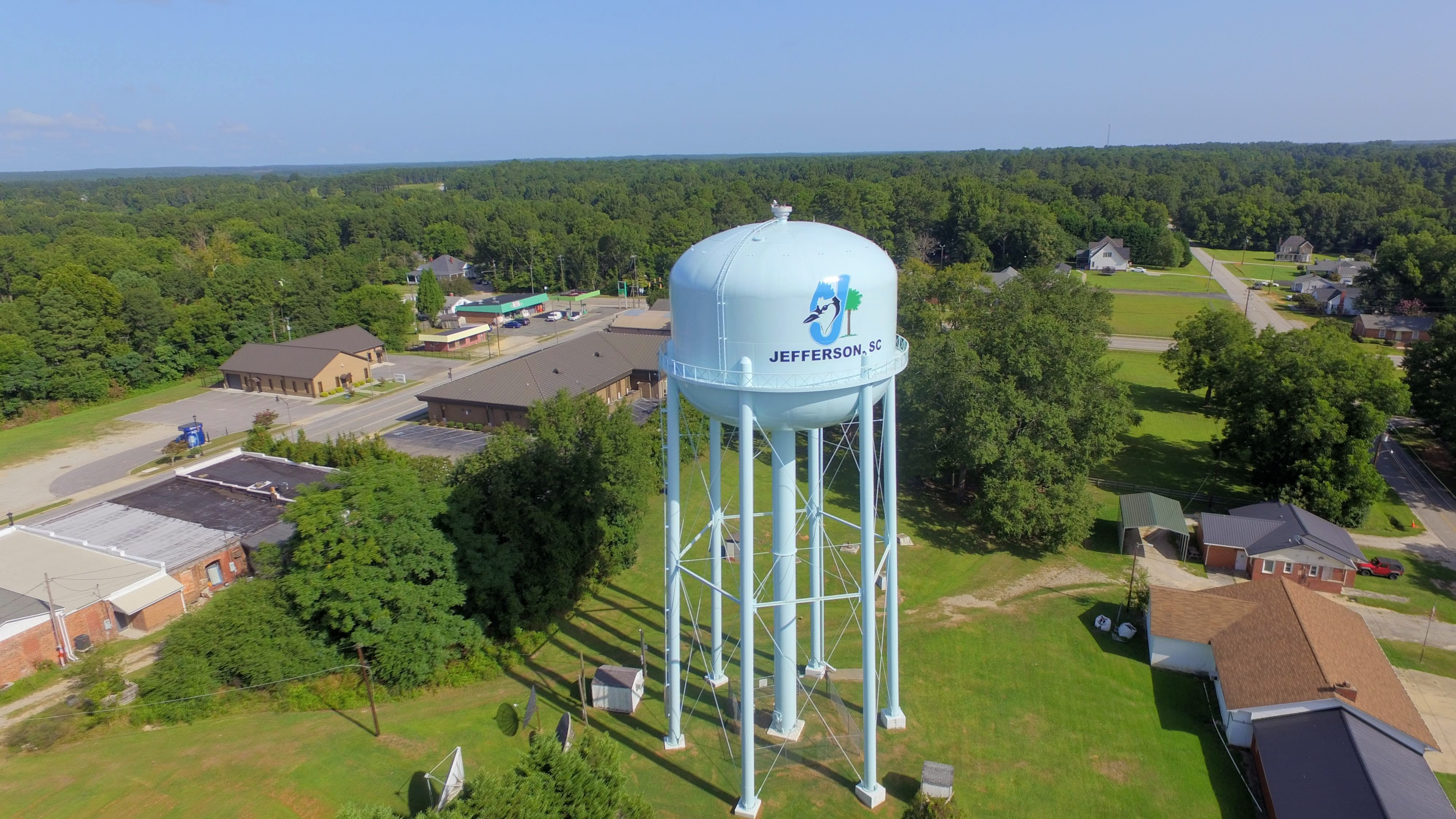
- Water tower, 2011
- Nickname: "J-Town"
- Motto: “A small town with big city dreams”
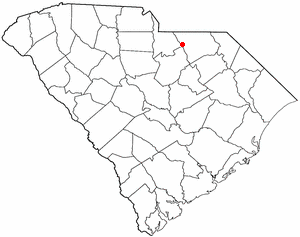
- Location of Jefferson, South Carolina
- Coordinates: 34°39′12″N 80°22′40″W
- Country: United States
- State: South Carolina
- County: Chesterfield
- Incorporated: 1904

Government
  - Type: Council

Area
  - Total: 1.81 sq mi (4.68 km^{2})
  - Land: 1.80 sq mi (4.67 km^{2})
  - Water: 0.0039 sq mi (0.01 km^{2})
- Elevation: 454 ft (138 m)

Population (2020)
  - Total: 772
  - Density: 428/sq mi (165.4/km^{2})
- Time zone: UTC−5 (Eastern (EST))
  - Summer (DST): UTC−4 (EDT)
- ZIP code: 29718
- Area codes: 843, 854
- FIPS code: 45-36610
- GNIS feature ID: 2405909
- Website: https://jefferson-sc.com/

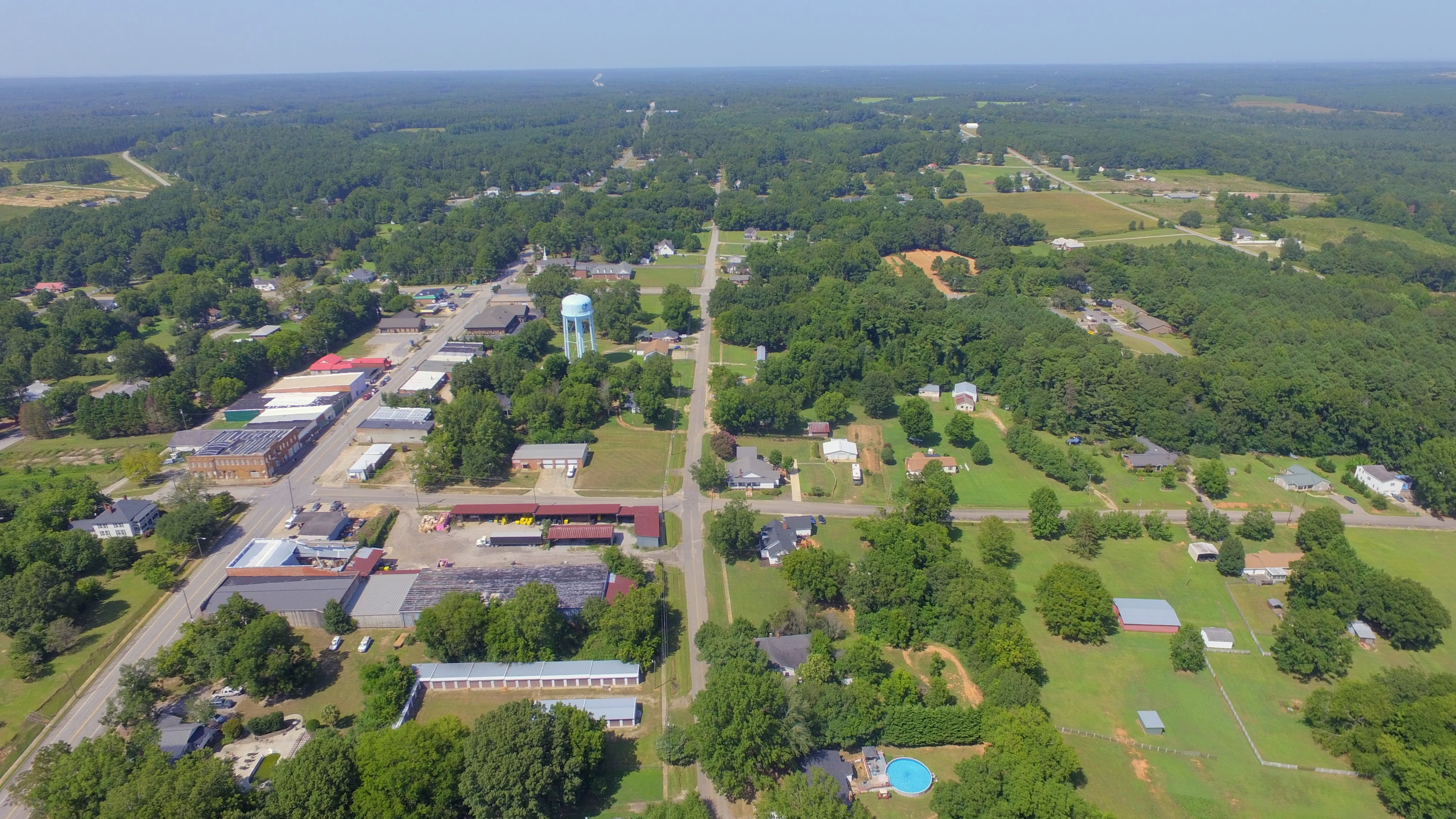
A drone view of Jefferson

Jefferson is a town in western Chesterfield County, South Carolina, United States at the junction of SC routes 265 and 151. Jefferson is located in the Piedmont region of South Carolina just in the edge meeting the Sandhills region. Jefferson is located 16 miles northwest of McBee, 8 miles south of Pageland, 50 miles southeast of Charlotte, North Carolina, and 70 miles north-northeast of the state capitol Columbia.

As of the 2020 census, Jefferson had a population of 772.

== History ==
Jefferson was incorporated in 1904. The area known today as the Town of Jefferson was founded in the late 1700’s to early 1800’s by the Miller Family on their farm land, and was named Millers store or Millersville on 1800s maps. The town was first incorporated in 1901 then 1904. The first Intendent/Mayor was Lewis E. Gardner (great-grandfather of current Mayor James M Miller in 2025). Lewis Gardner was married to Susan Alice Miller, the granddaughter of the founder Michael Miller. Many Millers are buried at the Miller-Lowry family cemetery on main street.

On April 14, 2020, a local turkey farm reported a case of Influenza A virus subtype H7N3 which resulted in the euthanasia of 32,000 turkeys.

== Geography and climate ==
According to the United States Census Bureau, the town has a total area of 1.8 square miles (4.7 km^{2}), of which 1.8 square miles (4.7 km^{2}) is land and 0.56% is water.

=== Neighboring towns ===
- Pageland, South Carolina – North
- Waxhaw, North Carolina - Northwest
- Mount Croghan, South Carolina – Northeast
- Chesterfield, South Carolina – East
- McBee, South Carolina – Southeast
- Bethune, South Carolina – South
- Kershaw, South Carolina - Southwest
- Lancaster, South Carolina – West

=== Brewer Gold Mine ===
The Brewer Gold Mine is an abandoned mine located on the western border of Chesterfield County, about 1.5 miles due west of the town of Jefferson, South Carolina. Brewer Gold Company owns approximately 1,000 acres of land along a small north-south ridgeline that divides Little Fork Creek and the Lynches River. About one-quarter of the 1,000 acres has been disturbed by mining operations. Brewer Gold Mine was one of the oldest and most productive gold mines in the eastern United States.

Activities at Brewer are rumored to date to the 16th century involving Indian trade with the Spaniards. Before the Revolutionary War, the area was mined for iron. The first documented discovery of gold took place by Burrell Brewer in 1828. Brewer Gold Company, a subsidiary owned by the British Costain Limited Group (Costain), secured ownership of the mine in 1986, with the first gold production occurring in August 1987. Ore was mined using conventional open pit methods until January 1995. Rock was first fractured using drilling and blasting, and then loaded into trucks. Waste rock was used as fill for facility construction or hauled to a disposal area to the south of the Brewer Pit. Ore was hauled to the crushing area where processing for the cyanide heap-leach method began. The crushed ore was then placed on pads and a dilute cyanide solution was sprayed over the heaps and allowed to percolate through the ore, thereby dissolving the gold into solution.

== Demographics ==
Historical population
Census	Pop.	Note	%±
1910	390		—
1920	454		16.4%
1930	499		9.9%
1940	547		9.6%
1950	556		1.6%
1960	493		−11.3%
1970	709		43.8%
1980	651		−8.2%
1990	745		14.4%
2000	704		−5.5%
2010	753		7.0%
2020	772		2.5%
U.S. Decennial Census

=== 2020 census ===
Jefferson racial composition
Race	Num.	Perc.
White (non-Hispanic)	477	61.79%
Black or African American (non-Hispanic)	245	31.74%
Native American	2	0.26%
Asian	13	1.68%
Other/Mixed	23	2.98%
Hispanic or Latino	12	1.55%

As of the 2020 United States census, there were 772 people, 350 households, and 248 families residing in the town.

=== 2000 census ===
As of the census of 2000, there were 704 people, 296 households, and 200 families residing in the town. The population density was 394.9 inhabitants per square mile (152.5/km^{2}). There were 345 housing units at an average density of 193.5 per square mile (74.7/km^{2}). The racial makeup of the town was 62.07% White, 34.80% African American, 1.14% from other races and 1.99% from two or more races. Hispanic or Latino of any race were 9.09% of the population.

There were 296 households, out of which 32.8% had children under the age of 18 living with them, 44.9% were married couples living together, 19.9% had a female householder with no husband present, and 32.1% were non-families. 29.7% of all households were made up of individuals, and 14.9% had someone living alone who was 65 years of age or older. The average household size was 2.38 and the average family size was 2.90.

In the town, the population was spread out, with 26.7% under the age of 18, 10.1% from 18 to 24, 23.6% from 25 to 44, 24.7% from 45 to 64, and 14.9% who were 65 years of age or older. The median age was 35 years. For every 100 females, there were 87.7 males. For every 100 females age 18 and over, there were 73.2 males.

The median income for a household in the town was $24,821, and the median income for a family was $31,875. Males had a median income of $25,417 versus $18,021 for females. The per capita income for the town was $12,924. About 19.9% of families and 27.2% of the population were below the poverty line, including 47.0% of those under age 18 and 19.4% of those age 65 or over.

== Recreation ==
The Jefferson Recreation Complex on Ogburn Drive is a multi-purpose public park that includes five baseball ballfields. In 2012, approximately 400 area youth ages three to 15 participated on 26 teams, including the building of a press box and restroom facility.

== Education ==
Public education in Pageland is administered by Chesterfield County School District. The district operates Jefferson Elementary School, New Heights Middle School, and Central High School. Northeastern Technical College offers higher education.

Jefferson has a public library, a branch of the Chesterfield County Library System.

== Infrastructure ==
=== Medical ===
Sandhills Medical Foundation is a community health center serving residents of Chesterfield, Kershaw, Lancaster and Sumter counties. It was founded in 1977.
