= McBee High School =

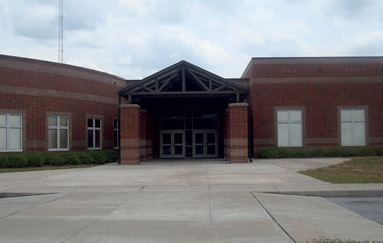
- McBee High School, 2011

Location
- 264 East Pine Avenue; McBee, South Carolina 29101; United States
- Coordinates: 34.466533°N 80.252233°W

Information
- School type: Public high school
- School district: Chesterfield County School District
- Educational authority: South Carolina Department of Education
- Superintendent: Chan Anderson, Ed.D.
- School board member: Jamie Wayne
- Principal: Sherry S. Young
- Teaching staff: 46.00 (FTE)
- Grades: 6–12
- Enrollment: 568 (2023-2024)
- Student to teacher ratio: 12.35
- Schedule type: Modified 4x4 block
- Colors: Red, white, and black
- Song: "Far Above Cayuga's Waters"
- Fight song: "On, Wisconsin!"
- Mascot: Black panther
- Feeder schools: McBee Elementary School, Plainview Elementary School
- Website: mhs.chesterfieldschools.org

McBee High School is a public secondary school serving grades 6 through 12 in McBee, South Carolina. The school is located on McBee's west side, near the intersection of Highway 151 and 1. It has an approximate enrollment of 500 students, and is one of four high schools under the jurisdiction of Chesterfield County Public School District.

== Students ==
Students come from two elementary schools, McBee Elementary School and Plainview Elementary School.

== Annual events ==
- Sandhills Classic Band Invitational – late September
- Homecoming Football Game and Parade – late October
