= McLeod Health =

McLeod Health logo

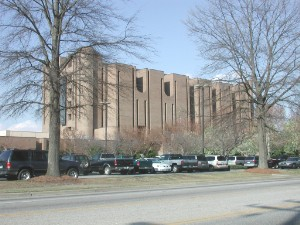
McLeod Regional Medical Center in Florence, South Carolina, part of McLeod Health.

McLeod Health is a hospital network serving the twelve counties of northeastern South Carolina. McLeod Health was founded in 1906. It is a locally owned, not-for-profit institution. In addition to seven acute care facilities, McLeod Health operates a home health agency, a cancer center, two urgent care facilities, a hospice service, and approximately 85 medical practices.

In July 2010, McLeod Regional Medical Center was honored with the American Hospital Association-McKesson Quest for Quality Prize, awarded annually to a hospital in the United States.

== Facilities ==
McLeod operates facilities in the Pee Dee area, including four hospitals and a fitness center.

=== Hospitals ===
- McLeod Regional Medical Center is a non-profit level two trauma medical center located on a 75-acre (300,000 m^{2}) campus in downtown Florence which includes 461 licensed beds and 40 Neonatal Intensive Care beds. 81 Emergency Department Rooms, including 4 adult trauma bays and 1 pediatric trauma bay. 3 helipads. The hospital complex contains the Cardiovascular Institute, the Center for Advance Surgery, the Cancer Center and a Children's Hospital unit.
- McLeod Darlington is a 49-bed acute hospital located in Darlington, South Carolina. It has 23 inpatient psychiatric beds.
- McLeod Loris: Founded in 1950 in Loris, South Carolina, it is a fully accredited acute care facility with 105 licensed beds.
- McLeod Clarendon is an 81-bed acute hospital located in Manning, South Carolina.
- McLeod Dillon is a 79-bed acute hospital located in Dillon, South Carolina.
- McLeod Seacoast, located in Little River, South Carolina, is a 118-bed hospital offering a wide range of inpatient and outpatient services. Its medical staff includes more than 120 active and affiliate physicians.
- McLeod Cheraw, located in Cheraw, South Carolina, is a hospital offering a wide range of inpatient and outpatient services. It has a medical staff of affiliate physicians.

=== Other facilities ===
- McLeod Center for Cancer Treatment & Research
- McLeod Health and Fitness Center is a fitness center located in Florence.
- McLeod Occupational Health
- McLeod Choice Pharmacy: in addition to prescription medications, the pharmacy offers over-the-counter medications and personal care items.
- McLeod Behavioral Health Center is a 23-bed inpatient facility in Darlington providing care to individuals experiencing a primary psychiatric illness with or without a co-occurring substance abuse disorder.
