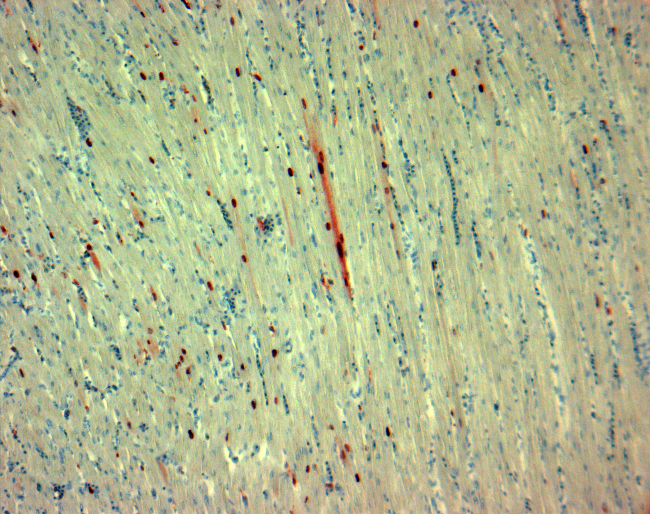

Virus classification
- (unranked): Virus
- Realm: Riboviria
- Kingdom: Orthornavirae
- Phylum: Negarnaviricota
- Class: Insthoviricetes
- Order: Articulavirales
- Family: Orthomyxoviridae
- Genus: Alphainfluenzavirus
- Species: Influenza A virus
- Serotype: Influenza A virus subtype H7N3

= Influenza A virus subtype H7N3 =

Virus subtype

Influenza A virus subtype H7N3 (A/H7N3) is a subtype of the species Influenza A virus (sometimes called bird flu virus).

In North America, the presence of H7N3 was confirmed at several poultry farms in British Columbia in February 2004; flocks were culled to halt the spread of the virus. Two humans, both poultry workers, were infected and had symptoms including conjunctivitis and mild influenza-like illness. Both fully recovered and were treated with oseltamivir.

In 1963, H7N3 was first found in Britain, in turkeys. For the first time since 1979, H7N3 was found in the UK in April 2006. It infected birds and one poultry worker (whose only symptom was conjunctivitis) in a Norfolk, England Witford Lodge Farm. Oseltamivir was used for prevention and 35,000 chickens were culled.

In 2005, H7N3 was detected in migratory bird droppings in Taiwan.

On September 27, 2007, another outbreak of H7N3 was detected in a poultry operation in Saskatchewan, Canada. The Canadian Food Inspection Agency has announced the euthanization of the flock and the disinfection of all building, materials, and equipment in contact with the birds or their droppings.

In June, 2012, an outbreak was found on about 10 farms in Jalisco, Mexico. Of the over 6 million birds checked, 1.7 million were found to be sick. The area primarily produces layers and supplies eggs. The virus is not transmitted from hens to their eggs.
