= Mount Croghan, South Carolina =

- Town
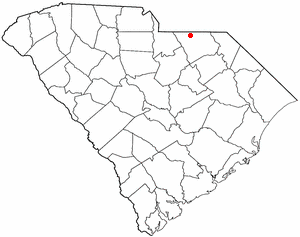
- Location of Mount Croghan, South Carolina
- Coordinates: 34°46′11″N 80°13′35″W
- Country: United States
- State: South Carolina
- County: Chesterfield

Area
  - Total: 0.76 sq mi (1.97 km^{2})
  - Land: 0.76 sq mi (1.97 km^{2})
  - Water: 0 sq mi (0.00 km^{2})
- Elevation: 443 ft (135 m)

Population (2020)
  - Total: 135
  - Density: 177.9/sq mi (68.69/km^{2})
- Time zone: UTC-5 (Eastern (EST))
  - Summer (DST): UTC-4 (EDT)
- ZIP code: 29727
- Area codes: 843, 854
- FIPS code: 45-48355
- GNIS feature ID: 2406205
- Website: www.mtcroghan.com

Mount Croghan is a town in Chesterfield County, South Carolina, United States. As of the 2020 census, Mount Croghan had a population of 135. It is well known for the Mt Croghan Flea market.

== Geography ==
Mount Croghan is located in northern Chesterfield County. South Carolina Highway 9 passes through the town, leading east 9 miles (14 km) to Chesterfield, the county seat, and west 9 miles (14 km) to Pageland. South Carolina Highway 109 leads north from Mount Croghan 3 miles (5 km) to the North Carolina border, from where North Carolina Highway 109 leads northeast another 14 miles (23 km) to Wadesboro. SC 109 joins SC 9 running east from Mount Croghan 3 miles (5 km) to Ruby. South Carolina Highway 268 leads southwest from Mount Croghan 13 miles (21 km) to Jefferson.

According to the United States Census Bureau, the town has a total area of 0.77 square miles (2.0 km^{2}), all land.

== Demographics ==
Historical population
Census	Pop.	Note	%±
1920	232		—
1930	229		−1.3%
1940	209		−8.7%
1950	209		0.0%
1960	145		−30.6%
1970	123		−15.2%
1980	146		18.7%
1990	131		−10.3%
2000	155		18.3%
2010	195		25.8%
2020	135		−30.8%
U.S. Decennial Census

As of the census of 2000, there were 155 people, 66 households, and 46 families residing in the town. The population density was 203.5 inhabitants per square mile (78.6/km^{2}). There were 70 housing units at an average density of 91.9 per square mile (35.5/km^{2}). The racial makeup of the town was 90.32% White and 9.68% African American.

There were 66 households, out of which 30.3% had children under the age of 18 living with them, 56.1% were married couples living together, 10.6% had a female householder with no husband present, and 28.8% were non-families. 28.8% of all households were made up of individuals, and 15.2% had someone living alone who was 65 years of age or older. The average household size was 2.35 and the average family size was 2.79.

In the town, the population was spread out, with 22.6% under the age of 18, 3.2% from 18 to 24, 27.1% from 25 to 44, 23.9% from 45 to 64, and 23.2% who were 65 years of age or older. The median age was 43 years. For every 100 females, there were 78.2 males. For every 100 females age 18 and over, there were 84.6 males.

The median income for a household in the town was $34,792, and the median income for a family was $36,875. Males had a median income of $30,625 versus $17,361 for females. The per capita income for the town was $14,880. About 2.6% of families and 3.8% of the population were below the poverty line, including none of those under the age of eighteen and 13.0% of those 65 or over.
