= Ruby, South Carolina =

- Town
- Seal
- Nickname: Jewel City
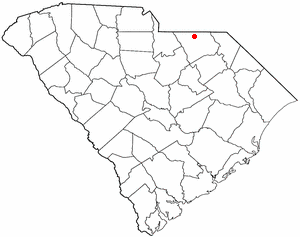
- Location of Ruby, South Carolina
- Coordinates: 34°44′55″N 80°10′42″W
- Country: United States
- State: South Carolina
- County: Chesterfield

Area
  - Total: 2.47 sq mi (6.40 km^{2})
  - Land: 2.47 sq mi (6.40 km^{2})
  - Water: 0 sq mi (0.00 km^{2})
- Elevation: 384 ft (117 m)

Population (2020)
  - Total: 307
  - Density: 124.3/sq mi (48.01/km^{2})
- Time zone: UTC-5 (Eastern (EST))
  - Summer (DST): UTC-4 (EDT)
- ZIP code: 29741
- Area codes: 843, 854
- FIPS code: 45-62080
- GNIS feature ID: 2407255

Ruby is a town in Chesterfield County, South Carolina, United States. The population was 307 at the 2020 census.

== History ==
Originally named "Flint Hill", Ruby was first settled in 1875. As with other nearby towns, it didn't develop until the railroad was constructed through town. The Cheraw & Lancaster Railroad arrived in 1902, and Ruby incorporated the same year.

Ruby has annual celebrations: the Jewel City Jubilee and the Fourth of July Parade and Fireworks.

== Geography ==
Ruby is located in northern Chesterfield County. South Carolina Highway 9 passes through the town, leading east 6 miles (10 km) to Chesterfield, the county seat, and northwest 3 miles (5 km) to Mount Croghan. South Carolina Highway 109 travels west with SC 9 to Mount Croghan and goes south from Ruby 8 miles (13 km) to its terminus at Campbell Crossroads.

According to the United States Census Bureau, Ruby has a total area of 2.5 square miles (6.4 km^{2}), all land.

== Demographics ==
Historical population
| Census | Pop. | Note | %± |
|---|---|---|---|
| 1910 | 194 | | — |
| 1920 | 290 | | 49.5% |
| 1930 | 326 | | 12.4% |
| 1940 | 337 | | 3.4% |
| 1950 | 315 | | −6.5% |
| 1960 | 284 | | −9.8% |
| 1970 | 306 | | 7.7% |
| 1980 | 256 | | −16.3% |
| 1990 | 300 | | 17.2% |
| 2000 | 348 | | 16.0% |
| 2010 | 360 | | 3.4% |
| 2020 | 307 | | −14.7% |
U.S. Decennial Census

As of the census of 2000, there were 348 people, 157 households, and 108 families residing in the town. The population density was 112.0 inhabitants per square mile (43.2/km^{2}). There were 182 housing units at an average density of 58.6 per square mile (22.6/km^{2}). The racial makeup of the town was 85.06% White, 13.79% African American, 0.29% Native American, and 0.86% from two or more races. Hispanic or Latino of any race were 0.57% of the population.

There were 157 households, out of which 26.8% had children under the age of 18 living with them, 56.1% were married couples living together, 7.6% had a female householder with no husband present, and 30.6% were non-families. 28.7% of all households were made up of individuals, and 14.6% had someone living alone who was 65 years of age or older. The average household size was 2.22 and the average family size was 2.70.

The town population distribution by age was as follows: 20.1% under the age of 18, 8.0% from 18 to 24, 29.3% from 25 to 44, 21.6% from 45 to 64, and 21.0% who were 65 years of age or older. The median age was 40 years. For every 100 females, there were 88.1 males. For every 100 females age 18 and over, there were 90.4 males.

The median income for a household in the town was $35,313, and the median income for a family was $43,636. Males had a median income of $23,750 versus $16,932 for females. The per capita income for the town was $16,441. About 3.1% of families and 8.7% of the population were below the poverty line, including 7.6% of those under age 18 and 14.6% of those age 65 or over.
