= Pageland, South Carolina =

Town in South Carolina, United States

- Town
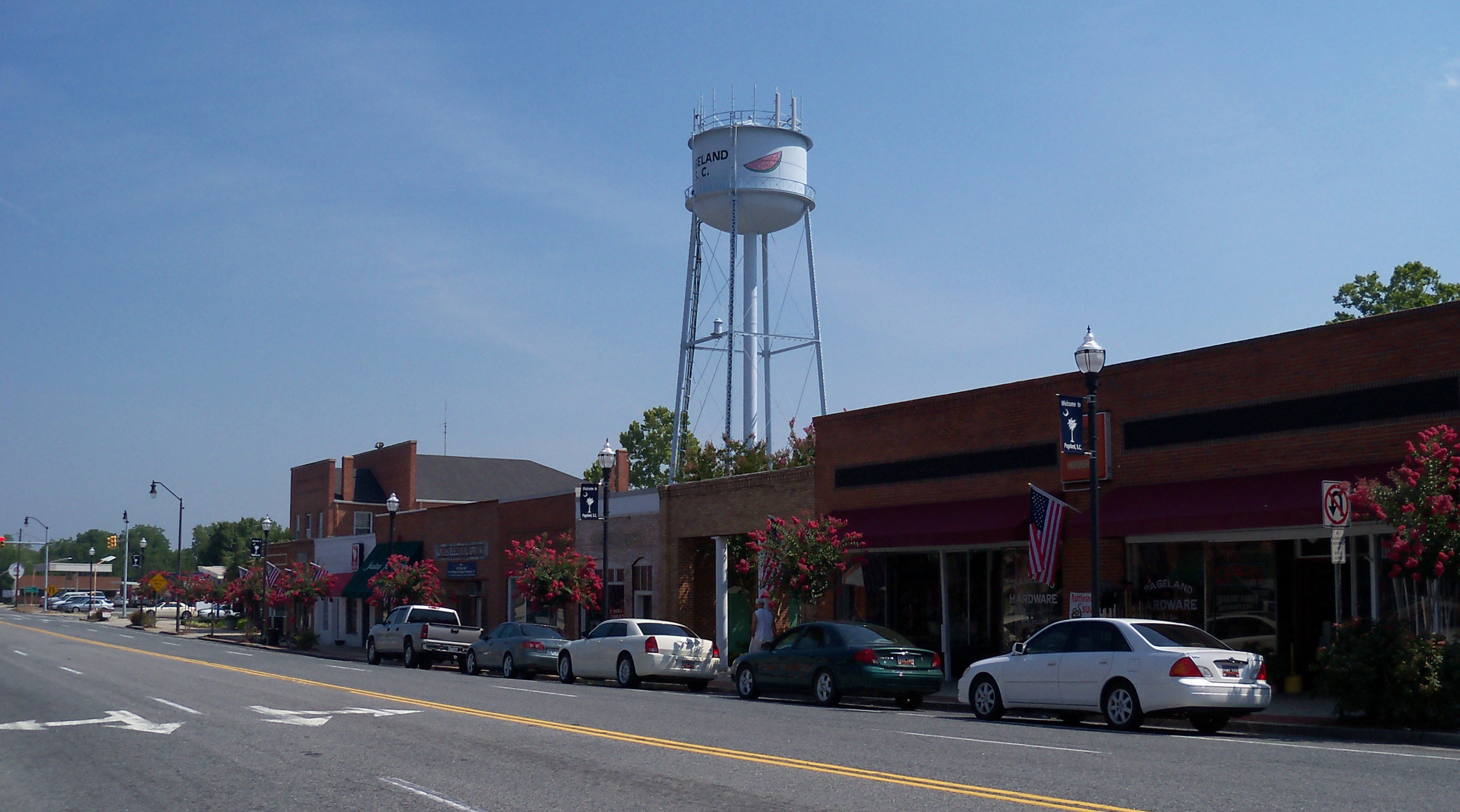
- Downtown Pageland

- Seal
- Nickname: The Watermelon Capital of World
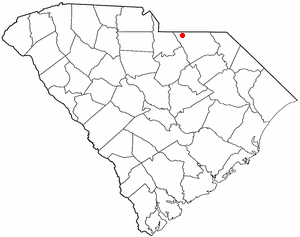
- Location of Pageland, South Carolina
- Coordinates: 34°45′36″N 80°22′31″W
- Country: United States
- State: South Carolina
- County: Chesterfield
- Chartered: January 11, 1908

Area
  - Total: 4.90 sq mi (12.69 km^{2})
  - Land: 4.86 sq mi (12.58 km^{2})
  - Water: 0.042 sq mi (0.11 km^{2})
- Elevation: 604 ft (184 m)

Population (2020)
  - Total: 2,456
  - Density: 505.7/sq mi (195.27/km^{2})
- Time zone: UTC−5 (Eastern (EST))
  - Summer (DST): UTC−4 (EDT)
- ZIP code: 29728
- Area code: 843, 854
- FIPS code: 45-54025
- GNIS feature ID: 2407065
- Website: https://townofpageland.com/

Pageland is a town in Chesterfield County, South Carolina, United States. It is the second largest town in Chesterfield County. The population was 2,760 at the 2010 census.

Pageland is widely known for the annual Pageland Watermelon Festival that has been held in July annually since 1951. The watermelon is an important staple in Pageland's community in history. In 1952, Pageland adopted the title of "The Watermelon Capital of the World." Many of the town's benches and business display watermelons and Pageland's water tower features a watermelon painted on the tank.

== Geography ==
Pageland is located in northwestern Chesterfield County. U.S. Route 601 passes through the town, leading north 18 miles (29 km) to Monroe, North Carolina, and southwest 20 miles (32 km) to Kershaw. Charlotte, North Carolina, is 41 miles (66 km) to the northwest via US 601 and US 74. South Carolina Highway 9 leads east from Pageland 19 miles (31 km) to Chesterfield and west 23 miles (37 km) to Lancaster. South Carolina Highway 151 leads south 8 miles (13 km) to Jefferson.

According to the United States Census Bureau, Pageland has a total area of 4.4 square miles (11.4 km^{2}), of which 4.4 square miles (11.3 km^{2}) is land and 0.04 square miles (0.1 km^{2}), or 0.97%, is water.

=== Neighboring towns ===
- Monroe, North Carolina – north
- Mount Croghan, South Carolina – east
- Jefferson, South Carolina – south
- Lancaster, South Carolina – west

=== Major highways ===
- US 601
- SC 9
- SC 151
- SC 207

== Demographics ==
Historical population
Census	Pop.	Note	%±
1910	360		—
1920	521		44.7%
1930	707		35.7%
1940	989		39.9%
1950	1,925		94.6%
1960	2,020		4.9%
1970	2,122		5.0%
1980	2,720		28.2%
1990	2,666		−2.0%
2000	2,521		−5.4%
2010	2,760		9.5%
2020	2,456		−11.0%
U.S. Decennial Census

=== 2020 census ===
Pageland racial composition
Race	Num.	Perc.
White (non-Hispanic)	1,135	46.21%
Black or African American (non-Hispanic)	891	36.28%
Native American	8	0.33%
Asian	24	0.98%
Other/Mixed	96	3.91%
Hispanic or Latino	302	12.3%

As of the 2020 United States census, there were 2,456 people, 1,019 households, and 647 families residing in the town.

=== 2000 census ===
As of the census of 2000, there were 2,521 people, 964 households, and 641 families residing in the town. The population density was 575.4 inhabitants per square mile (222.2/km^{2}). There were 1,071 housing units at an average density of 244.4 per square mile (94.4/km^{2}). The racial makeup of the town was 54.34% White, 35.82% African American, 0.24% Native American, 0.99% Asian, 0.04% Pacific Islander, 7.22% from other races, and 1.35% from two or more races. Hispanic or Latino of any race were 8.77% of the population.

There were 964 households, out of which 30.5% had children under the age of 18 living with them, 41.4% were married couples living together, 20.2% had a female householder with no husband present, and 33.5% were non-families. 28.7% of all households were made up of individuals, and 14.7% had someone living alone who was 65 years of age or older. The average household size was 2.54 and the average family size was 3.06.

In the town, the population was spread out, with 25.5% under the age of 18, 11.9% from 18 to 24, 28.0% from 25 to 44, 19.2% from 45 to 64, and 15.4% who were 65 years of age or older. The median age was 34 years. For every 100 females there were 92.9 males. For every 100 females age 18 and over, there were 88.9 males.

The median income for a household in the town was $29,046, and the median income for a family was $33,214. Males had a median income of $24,826 versus $18,452 for females. The per capita income for the town was $15,190. About 21.5% of families and 24.1% of the population were below the poverty line, including 37.2% of those under age 18 and 25.4% of those age 65 or over.

== Politics ==
In the South Carolina House of Representatives, Pageland is located in South Carolina's 53rd House district and is represented by Republican Richie Yow. In the South Carolina Senate, Pageland is located in Senate district 27 and represented by Penry Gustafson.

== Education ==
Public education in Pageland is administered by Chesterfield County School District. The district operates Petersburg Primary School, Pageland Elementary School, New Heights Middle School, and Central High School.

South Pointe Christian School, a private Christian school, operates in Pageland. It includes classes for preschool through high school.

Northeastern Technical College, part of the South Carolina Technical College System, has a branch in Pageland.

Pageland has a public library, a branch of the Chesterfield County Library System.

== Local media ==
The local newspaper is The Progressive Journal, which is published weekly on Tuesdays. Pageland also is covered by The Link, which is published weekly on Tuesday.

== Notable people ==
- Billy Backus, world champion boxer, has lived there
- Robbie Caldwell, former head football coach at Vanderbilt University, current offensive line coach at Clemson University
- Justice Cunningham, football player selected in the 2013 NFL draft by the Indianapolis Colts
- Corey Miller, football linebacker for the New York Giants
- Patina Miller, Tony Award-winning actress and singer, former student of Central High School in Pageland
- Van Lingle Mungo, baseball pitcher for the Major League Brooklyn Robins-Dodgers and New York Giants
