= Pee Dee (disambiguation) =

Pee Dee is a region of South Carolina.

Pee Dee or Peedee may also refer to the Pee Dee River or the following:

== People ==
- Pedee people, also spelled Pee Dee and Peedee, a historic Native American people, once concentrated in South Carolina
- Pee Dee Lumbee, modern communities of Lumbee descent in Pee Dee region of South Carolina

== Places ==
- Little Pee Dee River, tributary of the Pee Dee River
- Pee Dee, Anson County, North Carolina, United States, a populated place
- Pee Dee, Montgomery County, North Carolina, an unincorporated community
- Pee Dee Avenue Historic District, national historic district located at Albemarle, Stanly County, North Carolina.
- Pee Dee Creek, many streams
- Pee Dee National Wildlife Refuge, in Anson and Richmond Counties, North Carolina
- Pee Dee River, in North and South Carolina
- Peedee Formation, a geologic formation in North and South Carolina

== Sports ==
- Pee Dee Cyclones, a minor league ice hockey team based in Winston-Salem, North Carolina
- Pee Dee Pride, a professional minor-league hockey team that was based in Florence, SC

== Transportation ==
- CSS Peedee, also known as CSS Pee Dee, a Confederate gunboat.
- Pee Dee Bridge Company, South Carolina railroad company
- Pee Dee River Railway, South Carolina
- Wilmington—Pee Dee Line, railroad line running from Wilmington, North Carolina west to Pee Dee, South Carolina

== Other ==
- Nickname for the Cleveland Plain Dealer, the major daily newspaper of Cleveland, Ohio, United States
- PeeDee the Pirate, mascot of the East Carolina Pirates
- Peedee Fryman, a fictional character on Steven Universe
- Pee Dee Light Artillery, a distinguished Confederate artillery battery during the American Civil War
- Pee Dee Area Council, Boy Scouts organization in northeastern South Carolina

== See also ==
- PD (disambiguation)
- Pee Dee, North Carolina
