= National Register of Historic Places listings in Chesterfield County, South Carolina =

Location of Chesterfield County in South Carolina

This is a list of the National Register of Historic Places listings in Chesterfield County, South Carolina.

This is intended to be a complete list of the properties and districts on the National Register of Historic Places in Chesterfield County, South Carolina, United States. The locations of National Register properties and districts for which the latitude and longitude coordinates are included below, may be seen in a map.

There are 10 properties and districts listed on the National Register in the county.

This National Park Service list is complete through NPS recent listings posted December 12, 2025.

== Current listings ==
| | Name on the Register | Image | Date listed | Location | City or town | Description |
|---|---|---|---|---|---|---|
| 1 | Cheraw Historic District | Cheraw Historic District | November 20, 1974 (#74001844) | Bounded by Front, Kershaw, 3rd, McIver, Cedar, Greene, Christian, and Church Sts. 34°41′50″N 79°53′15″W | Cheraw | |
| 2 | Coulter Memorial Academy Historic District | | September 26, 2022 (#100008217) | Roughly bounded by Powe, Front, Second, and Kershaw Sts. 34°42′05″N 79°53′06″W | Cheraw | |
| 3 | East Main Street Historic District | East Main Street Historic District | May 4, 1982 (#82003847) | Hursey Dr. and E. Main and Craig Sts. 34°44′09″N 80°04′58″W | Chesterfield | |
| 4 | Evy Kirkley Site | | August 3, 1979 (#79002380) | Address Restricted | McBee | |
| 5 | Dr. Thomas E. Lucas House | Dr. Thomas E. Lucas House | May 4, 1982 (#82003848) | 716 W. Main St. 34°44′16″N 80°05′41″W | Chesterfield | |
| 6 | St. David's Episcopal Church and Cemetery | St. David's Episcopal Church and Cemetery | September 22, 1971 (#71000761) | Church St. 34°41′44″N 79°52′46″W | Cheraw | |
| 7 | Seaboard Air Line Railway Depot in McBee | Seaboard Air Line Railway Depot in McBee | September 2, 1999 (#99000103) | W. Pine Ave., northwest of the junction of South Carolina Highway 151 and U.S. Route 1; 34°28′09″N 80°15′27″W | McBee | |
| 8 | Seaboard Air Line Railway Depot in Patrick | Seaboard Air Line Railway Depot in Patrick | February 22, 1999 (#99000100) | Winburn St., south of junction of South Carolina Highway 102 and U.S. Route 1; 34°34′36″N 80°02′34″W | Patrick | |
| 9 | Robert Smalls School | Robert Smalls School | March 4, 2014 (#14000043) | 316 Front St. 34°42′07″N 79°53′01″W | Cheraw | |
| 10 | West Main Street Historic District | West Main Street Historic District | May 4, 1982 (#82003849) | W. Main, Church, and Academy Sts. 34°44′09″N 80°05′33″W | Chesterfield | |

== See also ==
- List of National Historic Landmarks in South Carolina
- National Register of Historic Places listings in South Carolina
