= CW 21 =

CW 21 may refer to the following television stations in the U.S. affiliated with The CW:

== Current affiliates ==
- WBRL-CD in Baton Rouge, Louisiana (O&O)
- WBAE in Alpena, Michigan (cable-only)

== Former affiliates ==
- WTTO in Birmingham, Alabama (2006–2026)
- WWMB in Florence, South Carolina (2006–2021), now on WPDE-DT2
