= North Carolina Highway 145 =

State highway in Anson County, North Carolina, US

North Carolina Highway 145

Route information
- Maintained by NCDOT
- Length: 13.6 mi (21.9 km)
- Existed: 1961–present

Major junctions
- South end: SC 145 at the South Carolina state line near Morven
- US 52 in Morven
- North end: US 74 near Pee Dee

Location
- Country: United States
- State: North Carolina
- Counties: Anson

Highway system
- North Carolina Highway System; Interstate; US; State; Scenic
← NC 144	→ NC 146

North Carolina Highway 145 (NC 145) is a primary state highway in the U.S. state of North Carolina. It runs from the South Carolina state line to U.S. Route 74 (US 74) entirely in Anson County.

== Route description ==
A two-lane rural highway, it traverses 13.6 miles (21.9 km), starting at the South Carolina state line, going through the town of Morven where it intersects US 52, and ending at US 74 just north of Pee Dee community.

== History ==
Established in 1961, NC 145 was a renumbering of NC 85. The route has not changed since its inception.

=== North Carolina Highway 85 ===
North Carolina Highway 85
- Location: SC State Line–Pee Dee, NC
- Length: 13.6 mi (21.9 km)
- Existed: 1937–1961

North Carolina Highway 85 (NC 85) was established in 1937 as a renumbering of NC 802. Around 1947, NC 85 was realigned onto new road, bypassing the Cairo community. In 1961, NC 85 was renumbered to NC 145 because of the Interstate 85 designation in the state.

=== North Carolina Highway 802 ===
North Carolina Highway 802
- Location: SC State Line–Pee Dee, NC
- Length: 13.6 mi (21.9 km)
- Existed: 1921–1925

North Carolina Highway 802 (NC 802) was established as a new primary routing in either 1929 or 1930 as an auxiliary route of NC 80 (today's US 52) in Morven. It traveled from SC 95 (today's SC 145) at the state line, going northeast through Cairo and Pee Dee, to US 74/NC 20. In 1937, both North and South Carolina agreed to renumber NC 802 and SC 95 to 85.

== Junction list ==
The entire route is in Anson County.

Location	mi	km	Destinations	Notes
	0.0	0.0	SC 145 south – Chesterfield	South Carolina state line
Morven	4.5	7.2	US 52 – McFarlan, Wadesboro	
Pee Dee	13.6	21.9	US 74 – Rockingham, Wadesboro	
1.000 mi = 1.609 km; 1.000 km = 0.621 mi
