= WPDF-LP =

Television station in Florence, South Carolina (1989–2002)

- Florence, South Carolina; United States
- Channels: Analog: 56 (UHF)

Programming
- Affiliations: Fox (1989–1996); Independent (1996–June 1997); Network One (June−November 1997); FamilyNet (November 1997–2002)

Ownership
- Owner: GE Media, Inc.
- Sister stations: WFXB

History
- First air date: January 31, 1989
- Last air date: March 12, 2002
- Former call signs: W56CC (1989–1995); WEYB-LP (1995–2001)

Technical information
- Licensing authority: FCC
- Facility ID: 71480
- Class: TX
- ERP: 6.45 kW
- HAAT: 191 m (627 ft)
- Transmitter coordinates: 34°7′44.39″N 79°50′5.97″W

Links
- Public license information: LMS

WPDF-LP (channel 56) was a low-power television station in Florence, South Carolina, United States, which broadcast from January 1989 to March 2002.

Until November 1996, the station was the Fox affiliate for parts of northeastern South Carolina.

== History ==
The station began broadcasting on January 31, 1989, as W56CC. It was owned by WELY, Inc., which in turn was named for owner Edward L. Young, a former congressman. In 1991, Young had filed to buy the construction permit for a new full-power station on channel 21 in Florence, WFIL, though no sale ever materialized. Young expressed interest in building the channel as an NBC affiliate, which the market lacked, or as a replacement for channel 56.

Known first by its translator call letters and then as "WELY-TV", the station became known as WEYB-LP on December 5, 1995. However, some cable systems continued to carry Fox programming not through the local station but via Foxnet. Additionally, channel 56 itself served only Florence; Myrtle Beach viewers tuned to WSFX-TV in Wilmington, North Carolina, while far southern portions of the market received either WTAT-TV from Charleston or WACH from Columbia.

Though the full-power channel 21 station, WWMB, eventually signed on in 1994, it did not affiliate with the new network, with WWMB being a primary UPN outlet. However, on November 10, 1996, WEYB-LP lost Fox to the newly renamed WFXB (channel 43), which had been sold and converted to a secular station; that station beat out WWMB for the affiliation. WEYB-LP was then sold, with the new owners—JME Media, which also owned WFXB—dropping all remaining local programming, including a daily community affairs program hosted by market veteran Doug Williams which had aired on the station for nearly all of its existence; channel 56 was converted into a Network One affiliate in June 1997. The new affiliation was short-lived, as Network One ceased operations on November 13 of that year. The station went off the air for a transmitter overhaul and returned as an affiliate of FamilyNet.

In 2001, WEYB-LP became WPDF-LP, but the mix of programming—FamilyNet programs and some locally produced religious and sports content—remained unchanged. However, the station faced an existential threat that was technical. WPDF-LP lost its bid to be designated a Class A station and became liable to be displaced if a station was to use channel 56 for digital television. The displacement occurred when Florence full-power station WBTW was assigned channel 56. In March 2002, WBTW-DT signed on, displacing WPDF-LP and leaving it without a channel to broadcast, resulting in it going off the air. Even though Time Warner Cable carried the low-power station, owner Greg Everett opted not to continue on cable only, believing that most of its audience watched the station over the air, and the FCC canceled the license on August 10, 2004.
