= South Carolina Highway 95 =

South Carolina Highway 95 may refer to:

- South Carolina Highway 95 (1920s–1930s), a former state highway from near McBee to near Chesterfield
- South Carolina Highway 95 (1939–1952), a former state highway partially in Little Rock
