= Sandblast Rally =

Coordinates: 34°33′25″N 80°04′46″W

Sandblast Rally logo

Sandblast Rally is a rally racing event for both cars and motorcycles. The event takes place in the towns of Chesterfield, Cheraw and Patrick, South Carolina, USA. In later years the events have been held in February of each year. The 2008 event was the largest rally in the United States.

== Characteristics ==
The rally takes place within the Sand Hills State Forest, part of the Sandhills region of the Carolinas. Most rallies are held on closed tarmac or gravel roads; sandblast rally roads are almost entirely sand. Some of the roads are compacted by heavy trucks, some of the more infrequently used roads are quite soft. This presents an unusual challenge to rally cars, as the constant drag of the sand increases the wear and drag on the transmissions. The driving technique is also different from other rallies, as the soft sand on the side of the road can be similar to a snowbank, while the braking ability exceeds that of tarmac with slick tires.

== History ==
Long named "Sandhills Sandblast" after the region, the event was first organized by Greg Healey in the early 1990s. In the second year of running the event became part of the SCCA ProRally national championship. Healey moved to Pennsylvania in the mid-1990s and the rally lay dormant for several years. The first rallies started at noon and ran well into the night, with three or four stages run in complete darkness.

In 2001 Charles Sherrill resurrected the event, with similar stages. One of the busiest years was 2003 when the event ran twice in one year, spring and fall. The fall event was the first event sanctioned by the newly formed NASA Rally Sport organization.

In 2005 Anders Green became the organizer, and the official name became "Sandblast Rally".

In the February 2007 event, motorcycles were introduced as part of NASA Rally Sport's new RallyMoto program.

== Past winners ==
Year	Driver & Codriver	Make	Motorcycle	Model
2020	Klim Fedoff and Boyd Smith	Mitsubishi Evo IX	Bill Conger	KTM 450XC
2019	Martin Donnelly and Brian Doherty	Ford Fiesta	Randy Richardson	Husqvarna 701 Enduro
2018	Eric Wages and Sarah Montplaisir	Subaru Impreza STi	Bobby Wooldridge	Husaberg FE 570
2017	Ruben Cuenca and Ramiro Arevalo	Subaru Impreza STi	Bill Conger	Aprilla RXV 5.5
2016	Patrick Brennan and Aaron Crescenti	Mitsubishi Evo IX	Bobby Wooldridge	Husaberg FE 570
2015	Gary Donoghue and Kieran McElhinney	Mitsubishi Evo	Bill Conger	Aprilla RXV 5.5
2014	Eric Wages and Sarah Montplaisir	Subaru Impreza STi	Devon Mahon	KTM 530 EXC
2013	Jason Smith and Jared Lantzy	Subaru Impreza	Michael Gilkey	KTM 950 Adventure S
2012	Michael Reilly and Joshua Benthien	Ford Escort Cosworth	Bill Conger	Aprilla RXV 5.5
2011	Charles Sherill and Wilson Von Kessler	Mitsubishi Evo IV	Aaron Gibson	KTM 690R
2010	Eduardo Bancalari and Jay Mauney	Subaru Impreza WRX	Bill Conger	Aprilla RXV 5.5
2009	Eduardo Bancalari and Jay Mauney	Subaru Impreza WRX	Michael Gilkey	KTM 950 SE
2008	Charles Sherrill and Brian O'Neal	Mitsubishi Evo IV	Mark Ely	Aprilla RXV 5.5
2007	Celcus Donnelly and Noel Gallagher	Mitsubishi Evo VIII	Mark Ely	Honda XR 640 SP
2006	Seamus Burke and Brian Sharkey	Mitsubishi Evo VIII		
2005	Seamus Burke and Charles Bradley	Mitsubishi Evo VIII		
2004	Seamus Burke and Charles Bradley	Mitsubishi Evo VIII		
2003 (Fall)	Seamus Burke and Brian Sharkey	Mitsubishi Evo VI		
2003 (Spring)	Seamus Burke and Emma Burke	Mitsubishi Evo VIII		
2002	John Drislane and Ronan Burke	Mitsubishi Evo IV		
2001	Thomas Lawless and Cathal McCaire	Mitsubishi Evo IV		
1996	Paul Choiniere and Jeff Becker	Hyundai Elantra		
1995	Paul Choiniere and Jeff Becker	Audi Coupe S2		
1994	Paul Choiniere and Jeff Becker	Audi Coupe S2		
