= Pee Dee, North Carolina =

Pee Dee, North Carolina may refer to:

- Pee Dee, Anson County, North Carolina
- Pee Dee, Montgomery County, North Carolina
