= PD =

PD, P.D., or Pd may refer to:

== Arts and media ==
- People's Democracy (newspaper), weekly organ of the Communist Party of India (Marxist)
- The Plain Dealer, a Cleveland, Ohio, US newspaper
- Post Diaspora, a time frame in the Honorverse series of science fiction novels
- Principia Discordia, a 1965 holy text in Discordianism
- Production designer, a profession in film or television
- Production diary, a promotional video podcast
- Public domain, a copyright status

== Economics and business ==
- Personnel department, of an organization
- Price discrimination, a microeconomic pricing strategy
- Probability of default, used in finance (Basel II)
- Professional degree, or first professional degree
- Professional development, learning to earn or maintain professional credentials
- Program director, in service industries
- Public Debt, of a government

== Organizations ==
=== Companies ===
- Phelps Dodge, a former American mining company, now part of Freeport-McMoRan
- Polyphony Digital, developer of the Gran Turismo video game series
- Porter Airlines (IATA airline designator), a regional airline headquartered at Billy Bishop Toronto City Airport, Canada

=== Government and law ===
- Police department
- Preventive detention, an imprisonment that is putatively justified for non-punitive purposes
- Property damage liability, in insurance
- Public defender, an attorney appointed to represent people who cannot afford to hire one
- Public domain, works whose exclusive intellectual property rights are no longer valid
- Punitive damages

=== Political parties ===
- Democratic Party of Albania (Partia Demokratike), a centre-right political party in Albania
- Democratic Party (Indonesia) (Partai Demokrat), a political party in Indonesia
- Democratic Party (Italy) (Partito Democratico), a centre-left political party in Italy
- Democratic Party (Malta) (Partit Demokratiku), a centre-left political party in Malta
- Democratic Party (Romania) (Partidul Democrat), a social-democratic and, later, a centre-right political party in Romania
- Democratic Party – demokraci.pl (Partia Demokratyczna – demokraci.pl), Poland
- Party of Democrats (Partito dei Democratici), a defunct political party in San Marino
- People's Democracy (Ireland), a defunct political organization in Ireland
- Progressive Democrats, a defunct political party in the Republic of Ireland
- Proyecto Dignidad, a political party in Puerto Rico

== Places ==
- Province of Padua (ISO 3166-2:IT), Italy
- Port Dickson (town), a coastal city in Negeri Sembilan, Malaysia

== Professions ==
- Doctor of Pharmacy, also abbreviated PharmD
- Postdoctoral, a research position or course of study
- Privatdozent, a title or position especially in German universities
- Production designer, a profession in film or television

== Science and technology ==
=== Medicine ===
- Paleolithic diet, a diet based on presumed ancient diets
- Panic disorder, a condition with excessive fear or anxiety
- Parkinson's disease, a degenerative neurological condition
- Paroxysmal dyskinesia, a group of movement disorders
- Pediatric dentistry, mouth health care and tooth repair for children
- Peritoneal dialysis, a way to filter the blood when the kidneys are not working well
- Personality disorder, any of various psychiatric problems
- Peyronie's disease, a connective tissue disorder involving the growth of fibrous plaques in the soft tissue of the penis
- Pharmacodynamics, the study of how a drug affects an organism
- Phenyldichloroarsine, a blister agent and vomiting agent
- Polydipsia, excessive thirst
- Progressive disease, a disease that continues to worsen and often has no proven total cure
- Psychotic depression, a major depressive episode that is accompanied by psychotic symptoms
- Pupillary distance, in optometry

=== Computing ===
- USB PD (USB Power Delivery), an extension of the USB standard
- pandas (software), package for data manipulation and analysis in the Python programming language
- Pentium D, a dual-core variant of the Pentium 4 processor
- Perfect Dark (P2P), a Japanese peer-to-peer file-sharing (P2P) application designed for use with Microsoft Windows
- Phase-change Dual, an optical media format
- Pure Data, a graphical audio-processing language

=== Physics ===
- Photodiode, a semiconductor device that converts light into current
- Potential difference, or voltage
- Partial discharge, an undesirable discharge phenomenon in high voltage dielectrics

=== Other uses in science and technology ===
- PD resistor, a pull-down resistor
- Pd test, the outcome of using a drop of para-phenylenediamine (also abbr. "Pd") to identify lichens
- Palladium, symbol Pd, a chemical element
- Photodisinfection, an alternative name for Antimicrobial Photodynamic Therapy
- Point-defence, a category of weapons
- Axiom of projective determinacy, in mathematical logic
- Pumpe Düse, a Volkswagen Group name for Unit Injector diesel engine technology

== Other uses ==
- The NYSE ticker symbol of PagerDuty
- Padang railway station, West Sumatra, Indonesia (station code)
- Full stop (or period, in American English), used in coded military communications
- Personal development, as used in the self-help and personal growth requiring fields
- peu difficile, in mountaineering, "little difficult" climbing grade International French adjectival system

== See also ==
- PD-50, a 1979 currently non-floating floating dry dock made in Sweden
- PD Draw, a bridge over the Passaic River, New Jersey, US
- PD-1, a cell surface receptor protein
- pd, the nickname of Brent Scott, the founder of the website Insex
- Pee Dee
- Pound (mass)
- Pulldown (disambiguation)
