= Belvin Maynard =

American pilot

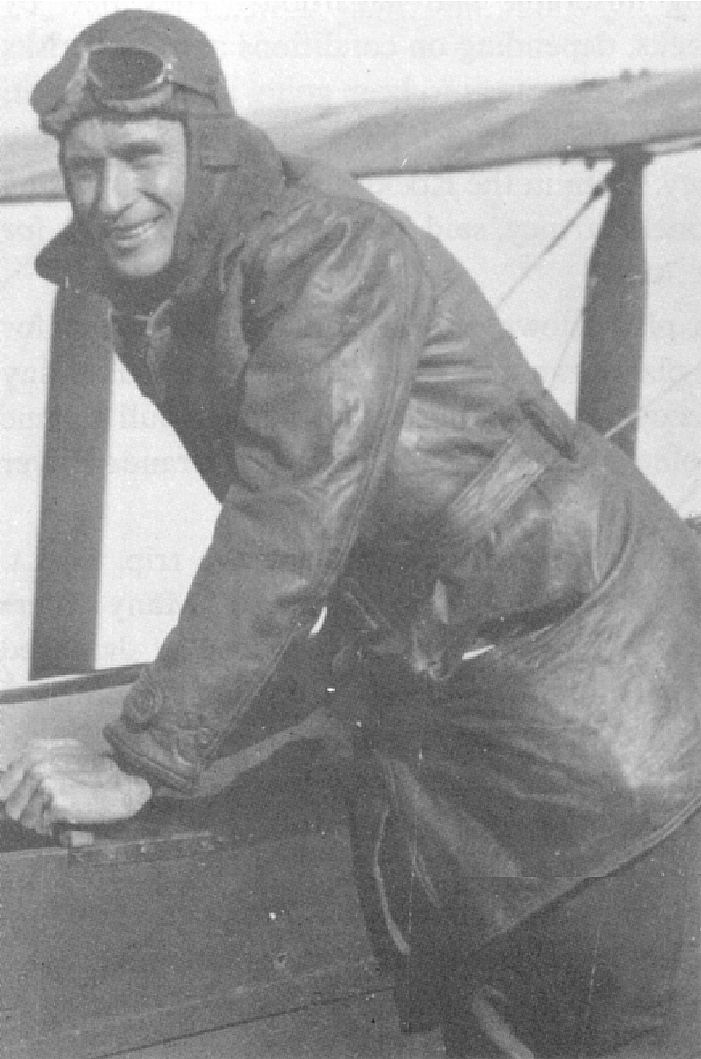
- Maynard in 1919
- Born: Belvin Womble Maynard Sr. September 28, 1892; Morven, North Carolina, U.S.
- Died: September 7, 1922 (aged 29); Rutland, Vermont, U.S.
- Known for: Winning the 1919 transcontinental air race
- Spouse: Essie Frances Goodson (m. 1913)
- Children: 4
- Aviation career
- Air force: United States Army Air Service
- Rank: Lieutenant

Belvin Womble Maynard Sr., known as the Flying Parson (September 28, 1892 – September 7, 1922) was an American aircraft pilot who won the United States Army's 1919 transcontinental air race from Mineola, New York to San Francisco.

== Early life ==
Maynard was born in Morven, North Carolina on September 28, 1892. After completing high school, he enrolled at Wake Forest College as a Baptist ministerial student.

== Military service ==
World War I broke out during Maynard's junior year at Wake Forest. As a divinity student, he was exempt from conscription under the Selective Service Act of 1917. However, in June 1917, he chose to enlist in the United States Army Air Service. He served as a trainer and a test pilot at Romorantin. After seventeen months abroad, he was reassigned to Hazelhurst Field as chief test pilot.

In September 1919, Maynard, flying a de Havilland with a Liberty motor, finished third in an international air derby from Mineola to Toronto and back. The following month, he won the Army's transcontinental air race from Mineola to San Francisco, flying 2701 miles over 21 flights in a time of 24 hours and 59 minutes. He was accompanied on the trip by his mechanic, Sergeant M. E. Cline, and a seven-month old German Shepherd named Trixie. On his return trip, Maynard encountered six snowstorms, dodged a mountain peak, and was forced down by a broken crankshaft.

On December 5, 1919, Maynard was the first pilot to land on the runway of the new airfield in Winston-Salem, North Carolina. The airstrip, which was the first commercial airfield in North Carolina, was named Maynard Field in his honor. It closed in the 1930s when air traffic moved to the nearby Miller Municipal Air Field.

== Post-military flying career ==
Maynard was discharged from the Army on May 8, 1920. He accepted a position with the Brooklyn YMCA and hoped to resume his education after a year or two and become a minister. He continued to fly, running a successful aerial photography business and participating in flying exhibitions. On April 14, 1922, Maynard flew a Fokker over New York City while passengers Thais Magrane and Jeanette Vreeland performed a radio benefit concert for the Veterans' Mountain Camp. In August 1922, he performed a marriage ceremony for fellow pilot Lloyd W. Bertaud and Helen Virginia Lent while flying a seaplane over the Hudson River. Maynard was also a frequent speaker in churches.

On September 7, 1922, Maynard was performing a flying exhibition at the Rutland State Fair in Rutland, Vermont. His plane nosedived while attempting a tailspin at a low altitude. His mechanic Charles Mionette and passenger Lieutenant I. R. Wood were killed instantly. Maynard survived the crash, but died before he could be transported to a hospital.
