= Juanita Moody =

American cryptographer and intelligence analyst (1924–2015)

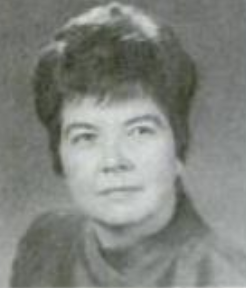
- Juanita Morris Moody, from a 1971 issue of Civil Service Journal
- Born: Juanita Morris; May 29, 1924; Morven, North Carolina, U.S.
- Died: February 17, 2015 (aged 90); Pawleys Island, South Carolina, U.S.
- Education: Western Carolina University
- Occupations: intelligence analyst, cryptographer
- Years active: 1943–1976
- Spouse: Warren Moody
- Awards: National Intelligence Medal of Achievement

Juanita Moody (née Morris; May 29, 1924 – February 17, 2015) was an American cryptographer, intelligence analyst and National Security Agency (NSA) executive. She worked for the Signals Intelligence Service (SIS) and NSA from 1943 until 1976.

Moody was responsible for providing intelligence to the White House and Department of Defense during the Cuban Missile Crisis. Her reports helped the United States avoid war with the Soviet Union.

== Biography ==
=== Early life ===
Juanita Morris was born in 1924 in Morven, North Carolina. Her father Joseph was a railroad worker and cotton-and-soybean farmer. Her mother Mary Elizabeth was a homemaker. Juanita was the first of nine children.

=== Early career ===
She began studying at Western Carolina University in 1942. She left in early 1943 to join the war effort; she volunteered at a recruitment office in Charlotte, North Carolina, and in April she was sent to Arlington Hall, the headquarters of the Signals Intelligence Service, in Arlington, Virginia.

She began training in cryptanalysis while waiting for her security clearance, but later, was transferred to an administrative library role. She remained interested in cryptanalysis, however, and joined a group that met outside of work to study a complex, unbroken German code system; as a result, she was assigned official code-related tasks. She was successful in breaking a German one-time pad cipher. By the end of the war she had been promoted from code clerk to a head of office.

She planned to return to Western Carolina University at the end of the war, but her supervisor asked her to remain with the SIS. She agreed, on the condition that she would be given a more complicated job.

She was promoted to the National Security Agency's research and development department after the war, where Moody became involved in computational cryptanalysis and analytic machines. Through the 1950s, she was a supervisor of Soviet analytic affairs and in 1960 was the head of signals intelligence operations to gather information about Cuba in Operation Mongoose, as the chief of the Office of Non-Communist Nations.

In 1961 she was promoted again. This time it was to section chief of G-Group, which was responsible for overseeing NSA operations nearly everywhere except China and the Soviet Union.

=== The Cuban Missile Crisis ===
Moody oversaw NSA responses to the Cuban Missile Crisis in October 1962 and was responsible for deciding what information relating to the crisis would be collected and processed.

In the fall of 1961, Moody was visited by Louis Tordella, the deputy director at NSA. With him, were two high-ranking officials from the Kennedy administration, one of whom was Edward Lansdale, an assistant secretary of defense. Lansdale said, "We want to know what you know about Cuba. Even if it’s a hunch, or a thought, or a guess, I want to know everything that's on your mind when you think Cuba." Moody began reciting information gathered from the sigint. Lansdale said in disbelief, "Now, come on!" as if Moody was exaggerating. Moody replied, "I don’t have to have any hunches. It is all in the sigint."

Lansdale was concerned that no one was providing the White House with that level of detail about an aggressive military buildup in Cuba, and he asked Moody to write up her findings. Moody spent the next several days compiling "wheelbarrow loads of material" for the assistant secretary of defense. When she finished the report, Moody urged Tordella to "publish" the report, meaning to circulate it among the intelligence agencies, the White House, the State Department, and the military. Tordella refused, citing the NSA charter that did not allow it, as it was the CIA's purview to release such information.

Moody persisted in pleading with Tordella to "publish" the reports she and her team were compiling. Tordella continued to reply, "We can’t do that. It will get us in trouble, because it would be considered outside of our charter." Moody responded, "It has reached the point, that I am more worried about the trouble we're going to get in having not published it, because someday we're going to have to answer for this."

Tordella finally published the report in February 1962. It was the first such NSA report distributed to the wider intelligence community. Before long, an old CIA friend of Moody's showed up at her office. He wanted to congratulate her. He said, "[e]verybody knows that you were responsible for getting that serialized report on what's happening in Cuba out, and I want you to know that was a good thing you did." He also warned her, however, that not everyone was thrilled about her initiative. He said that he had just come from a high-level meeting at the CIA during which officials tried to "decide what to do about NSA for overstepping their bounds."

After the discovery of nuclear weapons in Cuba in 1962, the mission at NSA shifted to assessing the war capabilities of the Soviet Union in real time, or as close to it as possible. NSA director Gordon Blake established an around-the-clock team to provide the sigint summaries twice a day as well as immediate updates, as needed. Moody was put in charge of this effort.

She once called United Nations ambassador Adlai Stevenson directly in the middle of the night at his hotel to apprise him of intelligence gathered a few hours earlier because State Department officials refused to put her through. Stevenson used the information in a United Nations speech the next day. Afterward, he sent congratulations to Moody and the agency.

After the Cuban Missile Crisis wound down, Adm. Robert Dennison, Commander of the U.S. Atlantic Fleet, wrote to the NSA director that the intelligence coming from NSA's Cuba desk was "one of the most important single factors in supporting our operations and improving our readiness."

=== Later career ===
She was promoted to higher positions in NSA throughout the 1960s and early 1970s. Moody became the focus of controversy in 1975 when she was called to testify in front of a Senate committee that was investigating abuses of power in federal intelligence agencies. Her name was widely associated with the investigation in the press, but NSA later clarified that she was not involved in any abuses of power and that her involvement in the investigation was as a spokesperson.

In 1975, Moody was awarded the inaugural National Intelligence Medal of Achievement. She retired from NSA the following year after 33 years of working for the agency. She was inducted into the NSA Hall of Honor in 2003.

== Personal life ==
In 1948, she married fellow civil servant Warren Moody.

She died in 2015 at her summer retreat, aged 90, and was buried at Arlington National Cemetery.
