= Pee Dee, Anson County, North Carolina =

Coordinates: 34°56′07″N 79°53′22″W

Pee Dee, also known as Pee Dee Station, is a populated place in Anson County, North Carolina, United States, situated at an elevation of 236 feet (72 m) AMSL. It is a former railway stop for passengers traveling on the Seaboard Air Line Railroad. Pee Dee is southeast of Lilesville, at the intersection of North Carolina Highway 74 and North Carolina Highway 145. The community was named after the Pee Dee River.

In the late 1800s and early 1900s, a school for Blacks operated at Pee Dee, known as the "Collegiate Institute for Negro Youth". The school was established and promoted by the Reverend Adam Martin Barrett. The Collegiate Institute was also known as the Collegiate and Industrial Institute and Barrett's College.

== See also ==
- Pee Dee, Montgomery County, North Carolina
- Pee Dee
