= Robert Smalls School =

- U.S. National Register of Historic Places
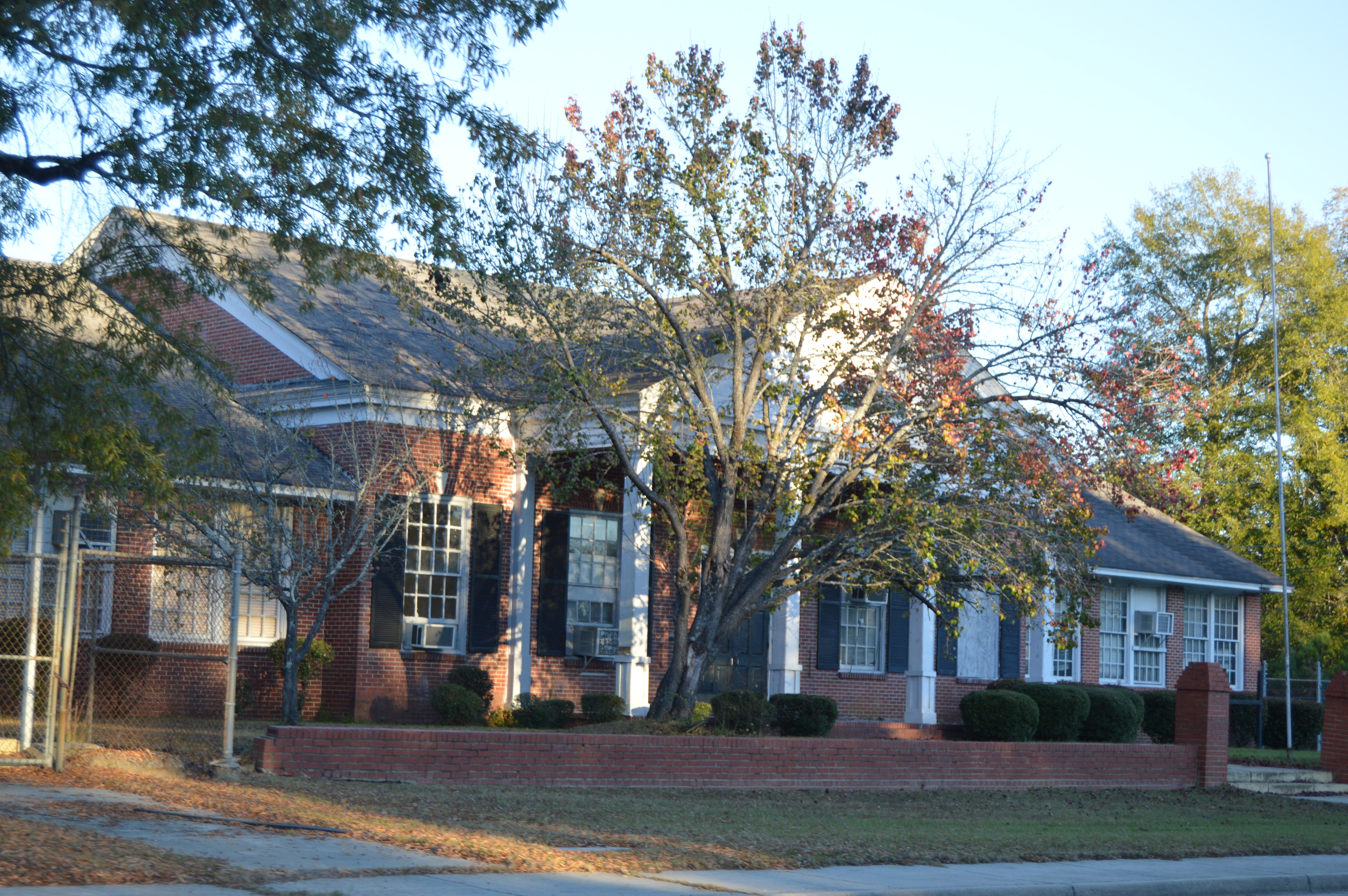
- Front of the school

- Location within South Carolina Location within the United States
- Location: 316 Front St., Cheraw, South Carolina
- Coordinates: 34°42′7″N 79°53′1″W
- Area: less than one acre
- Built: c. 1953
- NRHP reference No.: 14000043
- Added to NRHP: March 4, 2014

The Robert Smalls School is a historic school building at 316 Front Street in Cheraw, South Carolina. This single story brick Colonial Revival structure was designed by the Florence firm of Hopkins, Baker & Gill, and completed in 1953. It was part of a development effort by the city to modernize its schools while continuing to provide "separate but equal" education facilities for its African-American citizenry. It served as a public school until the 1990s, and was sold by the city to a nonprofit organization in 2012. It now houses a food pantry and services for at-risk youth. It was named for Robert Smalls.

It was listed on the National Register of Historic Places in 2014.

== See also ==
- National Register of Historic Places listings in Chesterfield County, South Carolina
