= Evy Kirkley Site =

Archaeological site in South Carolina, United States

- U.S. National Register of Historic Places
- Nearest city: McBee, South Carolina
- Area: 9.6 acres (3.9 ha)
- NRHP reference No.: 79002380
- Added to NRHP: August 3, 1979

Evy Kirkley Site is a historic archaeological site located near McBee, Chesterfield County, South Carolina. The site is a well-preserved, multi-component prehistoric site on the ecologically rich “Fall Line” of the state in the states’ slate belt. The site includes preserved animal bone, shell and macrofossil remains, and distributions of green volcanic slate debitage.

It was listed on the National Register of Historic Places in 1979.
