= WBTW =

Television station in Florence, South Carolina

- Florence–Myrtle Beach, South Carolina; Lumberton, North Carolina; United States
- City: Florence, South Carolina
- Channels: Digital: 13 (VHF); Virtual: 13
- Branding: WBTW News 13; The News 13 Network; 13.2 WBTW (on 13.2)

Programming
- Affiliations: 13.1: CBS; 13.2: MNTV and Antenna TV; for others, see § Subchannels

Ownership
- Owner: Nexstar Media Group; (Nexstar Media Inc.)
- Sister stations: WSPA-TV, WYCW

History
- First air date: October 18, 1954
- Former call signs: WPDV (CP, 1953–1954)
- Former channel numbers: Analog: 8 (VHF, 1954–1962), 13 (VHF, 1962–2009); Digital: 56 (UHF, 2001–2009)
- Former affiliations: ABC (secondary, 1954–1980)
- Call sign meaning: sequential after former co-owned WBTV

Technical information
- Licensing authority: FCC
- Facility ID: 66407
- ERP: 31.6 kW
- HAAT: 598 m (1,962 ft)
- Transmitter coordinates: 34°22′4″N 79°19′21″W

Links
- Public license information: Public file; LMS
- Website: www.wbtw.com

WBTW (channel 13) is a television station licensed to Florence, South Carolina, United States, serving the Pee Dee and Grand Strand regions of South Carolina as an affiliate of CBS. The station is owned by Nexstar Media Group, and maintains studios on McDonald Court in the unincorporated community of Socastee (but with a Myrtle Beach postal address); its transmitter is located near Dillon, South Carolina (across from the tower of ABC affiliate WPDE-TV, channel 15).

== History ==
The station went on the air on October 18, 1954, on VHF channel 8 from a transmitter at its original studios on TV Road in the Back Swamp section north of the town of Quinby (though with a Florence address). It was owned by Jefferson Standard Life Insurance Company (later becoming Jefferson-Pilot, now part of Lincoln Financial Group). It was Jefferson Standard's second television station behind WBTV in Charlotte, North Carolina. WBTW's call sign was derived from "W" being the next letter in the alphabet after "V". The two stations were programmed separately, but shared a microwave system built in 1959. On September 17, 1962, it moved to VHF channel 13, while its previous channel was reallocated to High Point, North Carolina, as WGHP.

Jefferson Standard sold the station to the Shott family of Bluefield, West Virginia, publishers of the Bluefield Daily Telegraph and owners of WHIS-AM-FM-TV in Bluefield through the Daily Telegraph Publishing Company, in 1968. The move came because WBTV and WBTW had a fairly significant grade B signal overlap, and neither station would have been able to expand its signal if Jefferson Standard had kept them both. During WBTW ownership by the Shott family, the station often used local radio personalities to deliver news, sports and weather. Regular talent included Jim (James) Griffin and Gene Allen.

In 1979, WBTW activated its current tower on Pee Dee Church Road in rural Dillon County, southeast of the county seat of Dillon south of South Carolina Highway 9. This more than doubled its coverage area, giving it at least secondary coverage as far north as Fayetteville, Raeford and Pinehurst; as far west as Polkton and Pageland; as far south as Georgetown and Summerton and as far east as Leland and Elizabethtown. Only local cable systems in Fayetteville and Pinehurst do not currently carry WBTW, but did until the 1980s and early-1990s. For much of the analog era, it had a large audience in the eastern portion of the neighboring Columbia market; until the mid-1980s, that city's CBS affiliate, WLTX, did not cover that area very well.

For many years, it was the only commercial television station located between Wilmington and Charleston. This was because of a quirk in the Federal Communications Commission (FCC)'s allocation of VHF channels. Most markets got at least two VHF allocations. However, Florence–Myrtle Beach is sandwiched between Raleigh–Durham (channels 4, 5, and 11) and Wilmington (channels 3 and 6) to the north, Charleston (channels 2, 4, 5, and 7) to the south, and Columbia (channel 10) and Charlotte (channels 3 and 9) to the west. This created a "doughnut" in northeastern South Carolina where there could be only one VHF license.

The station has always been a CBS affiliate, but carried some ABC shows until WPDE-TV (channel 15) signed-on in 1980. The Shotts sold most of their media holdings in 1984, with their two remaining television stations, WBTW and KIMT in Mason City, Iowa, going to Spartanburg-based Spartan Radiocasting Corporation (later Spartan Communications), the founding owners of fellow CBS affiliate WSPA-TV. In the late-1980s and early-1990s, it branded itself on-air as the "Best of Two Worlds" playing off the "BTW" in its call letters. In 2000, Spartan merged with Media General.

From 1995 to 2000, WBTW served as the de facto CBS affiliate for parts of the Wilmington market because former affiliate WJKA-TV switched to Fox and became WSFX-TV. That market got another CBS affiliate in 2000 when WILM-LP (now WILM-LD) picked up the affiliation. However, WBTW still served some parts of the Wilmington area that did not receive the low-powered WILM signal over-the-air or on cable. This ended in 2017 when WWAY acquired the CBS affiliation for its second digital subchannel. After being known as "TV 13" for most of its history, this station re-branded itself as "News 13" in 2002. WBTW's broadcasts became digital-only, effective June 12, 2009.

On May 2, 2011, a letter was submitted to the FCC requesting that WBTW be authorized to abandon its channel 13 frequency (213 MHz) and move to channel 41 (635 MHz), and transmit a non-directional signal with a strength of 1 million watts—equivalent to 5 million watts in analog (it is 316,000 watts on channel 13). The letter also requested that the height of the transmitter elements on the tower be the same as now on channel 13. This was never acted upon by the FCC and WBTW remains on channel 13.

On January 27, 2016, Media General announced that it had entered into a definite agreement to be acquired by Nexstar Broadcasting Group for $4.6 billion. The combined company would be called Nexstar Media Group and own 171 stations (including WBTW). The deal was completed on January 17, 2017.

== News operation ==
Historically, WBTW has been one of the most dominant stations in the country. This is in part because it was the only station in the market for a quarter-century; until WPDE signed on in 1980, viewers had to rely on cable to get programming from the other networks.

The ratings have tightened with more competition, but WBTW continues to lead. It is the only station that covers the entire market equally; WPDE and NBC affiliate WMBF-TV have largely focused on the Grand Strand in recent years.

Another factor in the station's dominance is talent continuity. Channel 13 has a number of staffers with remarkably long tenures for what has always been a small market. Bob Juback joined the station in 1984 as a sportscaster, moving to the weekend anchor desk in 1987. Juback took over as main anchorman in 1992 until his retirement in 2024, longer than anyone in the market's history. For the first 28 years of his tenure, Juback was teamed with Nicole Boone, who had been the station's top female anchor since 1989. Boone went into semi-retirement in 2020, but returns to cover special events in the market.

In 2004, WBTW established a news share agreement with Fox affiliate WFXB. It then began producing a weeknight 10 o'clock newscast for that station known as Fox 43 News at 10. In 2006, the title switched to Fox News at 10.

During August 2007, WBTW became the second station in the market to move most of its operations to new studios in Myrtle Beach. A smaller facility at that same site had been serving as the station's Grand Strand bureau since 1989; it was demolished in 2007 to make way for the larger facility. The station maintained some operations its old facilities in Florence for a time. However, by 2008 the station had moved all of its operations to Myrtle Beach. A physical Lumberton bureau closed in 2007. Like the other two stations in the market, it has kept a small team of reporters in Florence to cover the inland portion of the market.

In March 2008, WBTW converted its news operation to all-digital. The revamp included new graphics, new news set, and robotic studio cameras. In 2013, WBTW became the second station in the market (after NBC affiliate WMBF, which signed on in HD) to broadcast its newscasts in high definition. This left ABC affiliate WPDE as the last local news station to still broadcast in enhanced digital widescreen (until 2015).

On December 1, 2011, WBTW began producing an hour-long weekday morning show on WFXB. Known as Fox Morning News, the broadcast is seen from 7 until 8 a.m. offering a local alternative to the big three network morning shows. On May 19, 2012, WBTW launched an hour-long newscast on Saturday and Sunday mornings from 8 to 9 a.m.

On April 20, 2015, WBTW began producing a half-hour extension to its morning newscast at 4:30 a.m., as well as an hour-long 9 a.m. newscast titled News 13 NOW. The newscasts are the only ones on at that time in the Florence–Myrtle Beach market, and as a result, WBTW 13 produces five and a half hours of weekday morning news, with two of those hours produced for WFXB.

On September 10, 2018, WBTW debuted a 5:30 p.m. newscast, with Inside Edition moving to WMBF-TV in the same timeslot, which moved its 5:30 p.m. newscast to 7:30 p.m.

=== Notable former staff ===
- Darby Mullany Dunn – anchor (1993–1997)
- Rick Pizzo – sports anchor/reporter (1998–2001)
- Stephanie Sy – fill-in anchor/reporter (1999–2001)

== Subchannels ==
The station's signal is multiplexed:

Subchannels of WBTW
Subchannel	Res.	Short name	Programming
13.1	1080i	NEWS-13	CBS
13.2	480i	MYTV-13	MyNetworkTV & Antenna TV
13.3	480i	ION-13	Ion
13.4	480i	ESCAPE	Ion Mystery
21.1	720p	DABL	Roar (WWMB)

Broadcast on behalf of another station

On September 5, 2006, WBTW launched a new subchannel branded as "My TV", carrying programming from MyNetworkTV and Retro TV. In 2011, Retro TV was replaced with Antenna TV and the subchannel was rebranded as "WBTW 13.2".
