= Pee Dee Creek =

Pee Dee Creek may refer to:

- Pee Dee Creek (Mississippi)
- Pee Dee Creek (Missouri)

== See also ==
- Pee Dee River
