= Patrick, South Carolina =

- Town
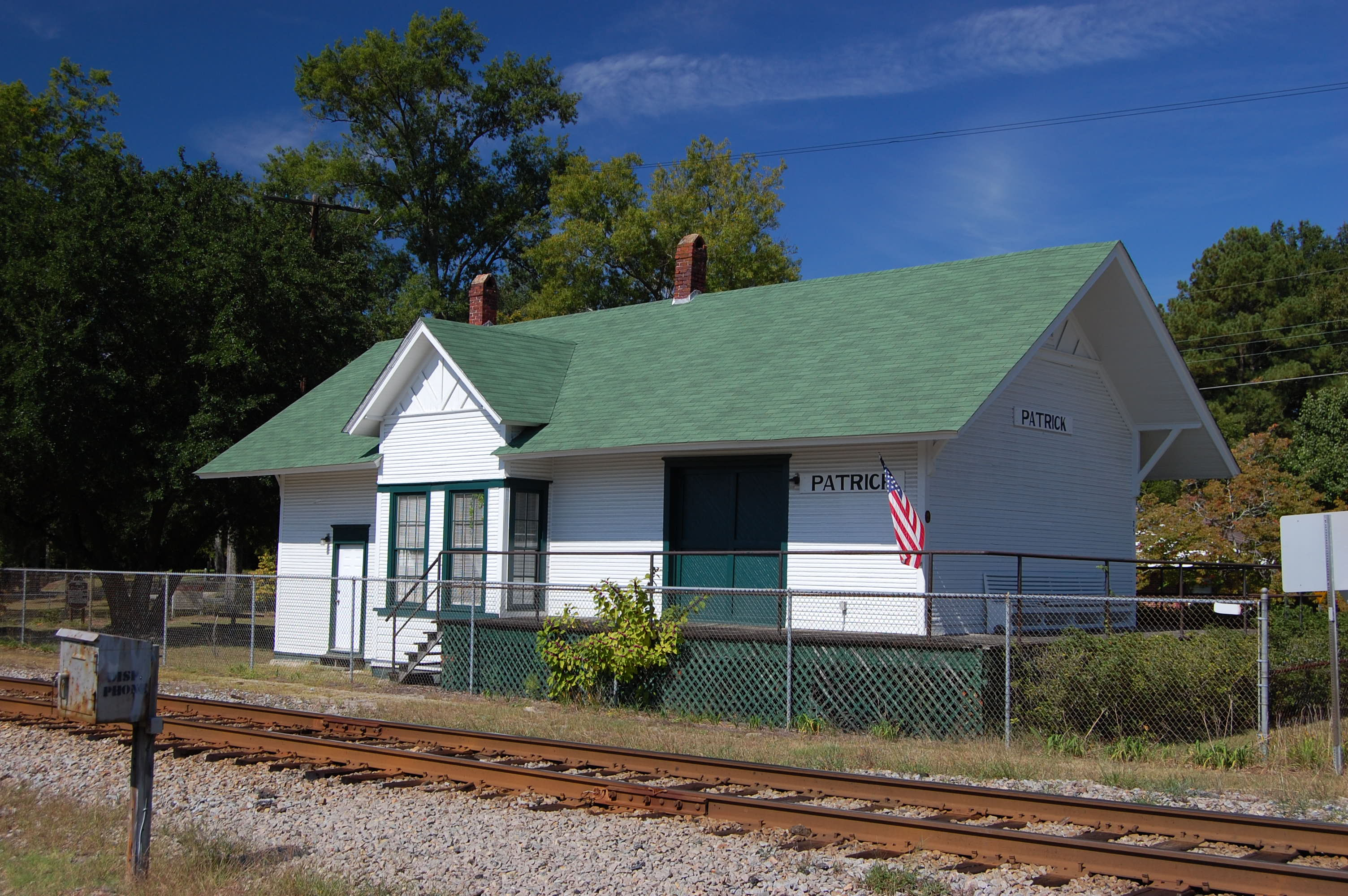
- Historic train station in Patrick, 2009

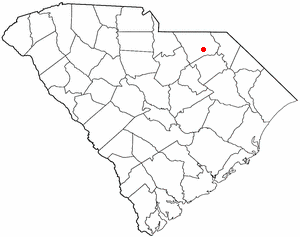
- Location of Patrick, South Carolina
- Coordinates: 34°34′31″N 80°02′41″W
- Country: United States
- State: South Carolina
- County: Chesterfield

Area
  - Total: 0.96 sq mi (2.48 km^{2})
  - Land: 0.96 sq mi (2.48 km^{2})
  - Water: 0 sq mi (0.00 km^{2})
- Elevation: 220 ft (67 m)

Population (2020)
  - Total: 266
  - Density: 277.3/sq mi (107.07/km^{2})
- Time zone: UTC-5 (Eastern (EST))
  - Summer (DST): UTC-4 (EDT)
- ZIP code: 29584
- Area codes: 843, 854
- FIPS code: 45-54925
- GNIS feature ID: 2407080
- Website: www.townofpatrick.com

Patrick is a town in Chesterfield County, South Carolina, United States. As of 2026, Patrick is recorded with a population of 290.

== History ==
The Seaboard Air Line Railway Depot was listed on the National Register of Historic Places in 1999.

== Geography ==
Patrick is located in southeastern Chesterfield County in the Sandhills region of the Carolinas.

U.S. Route 1 passes through the town, leading northeast 13 miles (21 km) to Cheraw and southwest 15 miles (24 km) to McBee. South Carolina Highway 102 crosses US 1 in the center of town, leading north 12 miles (19 km) to Chesterfield and south 15 miles (24 km) to Hartsville.

According to the United States Census Bureau, Patrick has a total area of 0.97 square miles (2.5 km^{2}), all land.

== Demographics ==
Historical population
| Census | Pop. | Note | %± |
|---|---|---|---|
| 1910 | 98 | | — |
| 1920 | 164 | | 67.3% |
| 1930 | 230 | | 40.2% |
| 1940 | 270 | | 17.4% |
| 1950 | 310 | | 14.8% |
| 1960 | 393 | | 26.8% |
| 1970 | 421 | | 7.1% |
| 1980 | 375 | | −10.9% |
| 1990 | 368 | | −1.9% |
| 2000 | 354 | | −3.8% |
| 2010 | 351 | | −0.8% |
| 2020 | 266 | | −24.2% |
U.S. Decennial Census

At the 2000 census, there were 354 people, 153 households and 97 families residing in the town. The population density was 360.8 inhabitants per square mile (139.3/km^{2}). There were 162 housing units at an average density of 165.1 per square mile (63.7/km^{2}). The racial makeup of the town was 75.71% White, 23.73% African American, 0.28% Native American, and 0.28% from two or more races. Hispanic or Latino of any race were 2.26% of the population.

There were 153 households, of which 23.5% had children under the age of 18 living with them, 47.1% were married couples living together, 10.5% had a female householder with no husband present, and 36.6% were non-families. 35.3% of all households were made up of individuals, and 13.7% had someone living alone who was 65 years of age or older. The average household size was 2.31 and the average family size was 3.01.

23.2% of the population were under the age of 18, 5.6% from 18 to 24, 28.0% from 25 to 44, 29.4% from 45 to 64, and 13.8% who were 65 years of age or older. The median age was 40 years. For every 100 females, there were 103.4 males. For every 100 females age 18 and over, there were 95.7 males.

The median household income was $26,56, and the median family income was $32,000. Males had a median income of $24,583 versus $31,429 for females. The per capita income for the town was $15,487. About 15.7% of families and 18.5% of the population were below the poverty line, including 44.1% of those under age 18 and 19.6% of those age 65 or over.

The mayor and council members are elected to 4 year terms.Two members of council are elected every two years from 4 year terms.

== Events ==
Two major events that take place in Patrick each year are:

- Sandblast Rally, a car race sanctioned by NASA Rally Sport
- Patrick Pine Straw Festival

== See also ==
- National Register of Historic Places listings in Chesterfield County, South Carolina
