= South Carolina Highway 145 =

State highway in South Carolina, United States

South Carolina Highway 145

Route information
- Maintained by SCDOT
- Length: 26.150 mi (42.084 km)
- Existed: 1960–present

Major junctions
- South end: US 1 near McBee
- SC 9 in Chesterfield
- North end: NC 145 at the North Carolina state line near Morven, NC

Location
- Country: United States
- State: South Carolina
- Counties: Chesterfield

Highway system
- South Carolina State Highway System; Interstate; US; State; Scenic
← SC 137	→ SC 146

South Carolina Highway 145 (SC 145) is a 26.150-mile (42.084 km) primary state highway in the U.S. state of South Carolina. It serves to connect Chesterfield with central Chesterfield County and McBee. The highway has been designated as the Carolina Sandhills Parkway by the SC General Assembly.

== Route description ==
SC 145 is a two-lane rural highway that traverses from U.S. Route 1 (US 1) near McBee, through the county seat of Chesterfield, to the North Carolina state line. It also travels through forest and wildlife refuge areas. The entire route has been officially named the Carolinas Sandhills Parkway by the State of South Carolina.

== History ==
The first SC 145 appeared in 1941 or 1942 as a new primary route from SC 644 to US 15 north of Walterboro. In 1948, it was downgraded to secondary status, known today as McLeod Road.

The current SC 145 was established in 1960 as a renumbering of SC 85; little has changed since.

=== South Carolina Highway 85 ===
South Carolina Highway 85
- Location: Chesterfield County
- Existed: 1938–1961

South Carolina Highway 85 (SC 85) was established in 1938 as a renumbering of SC 95, it traveled from US 1, near McBee, through Chesterfield, to the North Carolina state line, north-northeast of Chesterfield. In 1961, it was decommissioned and renumbered to SC 145 to match with NC 145.

== Major intersections ==
The entire route is in Chesterfield County.

Location	mi	km	Destinations	Notes
	0.0	0.0	US 1 – McBee, Camden, Patrick	Southern terminus
	11.970	19.264	SC 109 north – Ruby	Southern terminus of SC 109
Chesterfield	19.980	32.155	SC 9 – Ruby, Pageland, Cheraw	
Chesterfield	20.100	32.348	SC 9 Bus. (Main Street)	
	21.860	35.180	SC 742 north – Wadesboro	Southern terminus of SC 742
	26.150	42.084	NC 145 north	Continuation beyond North Carolina state line
1.000 mi = 1.609 km; 1.000 km = 0.621 mi
