= WFXB =

Television station in Myrtle Beach, South Carolina

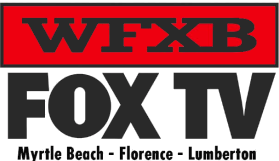
- Myrtle Beach–Florence, South Carolina; Lumberton, North Carolina; United States
- City: Myrtle Beach, South Carolina
- Channels: Digital: 36 (UHF); Virtual: 43
- Branding: FXB Fox TV

Programming
- Affiliations: 43.1: Fox; for others, see § Subchannels

Ownership
- Owner: Bahakel Communications; (Springfield Broadcasting Partners)

History
- First air date: July 5, 1984
- Former call signs: WGSE (1984–1996)
- Former channel numbers: Analog: 43 (UHF, 1984–2009); Digital: 18 (UHF, 2001–2019)
- Former affiliations: Independent (1984–1995); The WB (1995–1998, secondary after 1996)
- Call sign meaning: "Fox Myrtle Beach"

Technical information
- Licensing authority: FCC
- Facility ID: 9054
- ERP: 1,000 kW
- HAAT: 459 m (1,506 ft)
- Transmitter coordinates: 34°11′20″N 79°10′59″W

Links
- Public license information: Public file; LMS
- Website: www.wfxb.com

WFXB (channel 43) is a television station licensed to Myrtle Beach, South Carolina, United States, serving the Grand Strand and Pee Dee regions of South Carolina as an affiliate of the Fox network. Owned by Bahakel Communications, the station maintains studios on Huger Street in Myrtle Beach, west of Myrtle Beach International Airport, with an advertising sales office on East Evans Street in Florence; its transmitter is located on Grices Ferry Court near US 76 east of Mullins.

Established as a Christian independent station under the call sign WGSE in 1984, the station gradually became a more secular outlet; in 1996, it was sold and obtained the Fox affiliation for the market. In addition to Fox network programming, the station produces several local talk and news shows and airs additional news programming produced for it by local CBS affiliate WBTW.

== History ==
Channel 43 began broadcasting as independent station WGSE, the first TV station in Myrtle Beach, on July 5, 1984. It was owned by Carolina Christian Broadcasting of Greenville, owner of WGGS-TV in that city. Its lineup consisted of religious programs, both national and regional (such as Niteline from WGGS), as well as family-friendly secular shows and content from the short-lived Prime of Life Network, targeting seniors. The station's early years were far from a financial success. In 1987, Cox Cable, then the main cable provider in the Grand Strand, moved WGSE from channel 4 to channel 23 on its Myrtle Beach and Conway systems. This caused a "crisis" for the station, as it was now inaccessible to viewers without a converter. Even before the rash of televangelist scandals in 1987 and 1988, channel 43 struggled to survive. It was entirely subsidized by money from WGGS-TV and bank loans; operations manager and news director Jim Rizutti admitted in 1988, "It would not be an overstatement to say we've lost our shirt down here." He added that the station came close to shutting down several times, and believed that in the long run it would have to be sold.

Beginning in 1991, the station slowly added more secular programs, as well as Charlotte Hornets basketball. WGSE became a charter WB affiliate on January 11, 1995.

With viewership never supporting the station adequately, Carolina Christian Broadcasting sold WGSE to James McGregor Everett in 1996. Religious programming was cut back that fall from a third to 12 percent of channel 43's broadcast day, with some CCB-produced programming remaining as part of the sale agreement. Everett also pursued the Fox affiliation for the market. Two years prior, WWMB-TV (channel 21), a new station licensed to Florence, had gone so far as to have a verbal agreement with the network, which instead opted to use WSFX-TV out of Wilmington, North Carolina (and owned by James Everett's father, Robinson O. Everett), to cover the Grand Strand; Fox had even helped WWMB pick syndicated programming with a view to moving there. However, Fox's desire to use an independent business instead of WWMB, whose operations were managed by ABC affiliate WPDE-TV, steered the network to channel 43. Beginning on November 10, 1996, channel 43 became the Fox affiliate for Florence and Myrtle Beach; With this, the station changed its call letters to the current WFXB. Florence–Myrtle Beach had been the only area of South Carolina, and one of the few in the Eastern Time Zone, without a full-power over-the-air Fox affiliate. Florence proper had a low-power Fox affiliate, WEYB-LP (channel 56), which was ousted from the network with WFXB joining; co-owned WSFX-TV had been serving Myrtle Beach-area cable systems since it switched from CBS in 1994, and some parts of the market received a signal from WTAT-TV in Charleston.

The station retained the WB affiliation for another two years on a secondary basis, giving it up upon the launch of The WB 100+, which launched the cable-only station "WFWB" for the market. By this point, more talk and reality shows as well as recent sitcoms were added. Children's programming left the station in 2002 when Fox ended its weekday kids block. Current owner Bahakel Communications purchased the station in 2006.

== Newscasts ==
From the late 1980s to 1992, WGSE produced a local newscast. Shortly after becoming a Fox affiliate, WFXB once again started a local news operation, first producing short news updates at 10 p.m. and later expanding to a full 30-minute news broadcast. This was cut back in January 2001, owing to poor ratings and a slowing economy.

In 2004, WFXB entered into a news share agreement with CBS affiliate WBTW (channel 13) for the production of a 35-minute 10 p.m. newscast on weeknights. On December 1, 2011, WBTW began producing an hour-long newscast for WFXB airing on weekday mornings at 7 a.m. titled Fox Morning News.

== Subchannels ==
The station's signal is multiplexed:

Subchannels of WFXB
Subchannel	Res.	Short name	Programming
43.1	720p	WFXB-DT	Fox
43.2	480i	QVC-TV	QVC Over the Air
43.3	480i	WFXB-ST	Start TV
43.4	480i	WFXB-ME	MeTV
43.5	480i	WFXB-HI	Heroes & Icons
43.6	480i	WFXB-JU	True Crime Network
43.7	480i	WFXB-CZ	Cozi TV
43.8	480i	WFXB-ST	Story Television
43.9	480i	MeTOONs	MeTV Toons
