= East Main Street Historic District (Chesterfield, South Carolina) =

Historic district in South Carolina, United States

- U.S. National Register of Historic Places
- U.S. Historic district
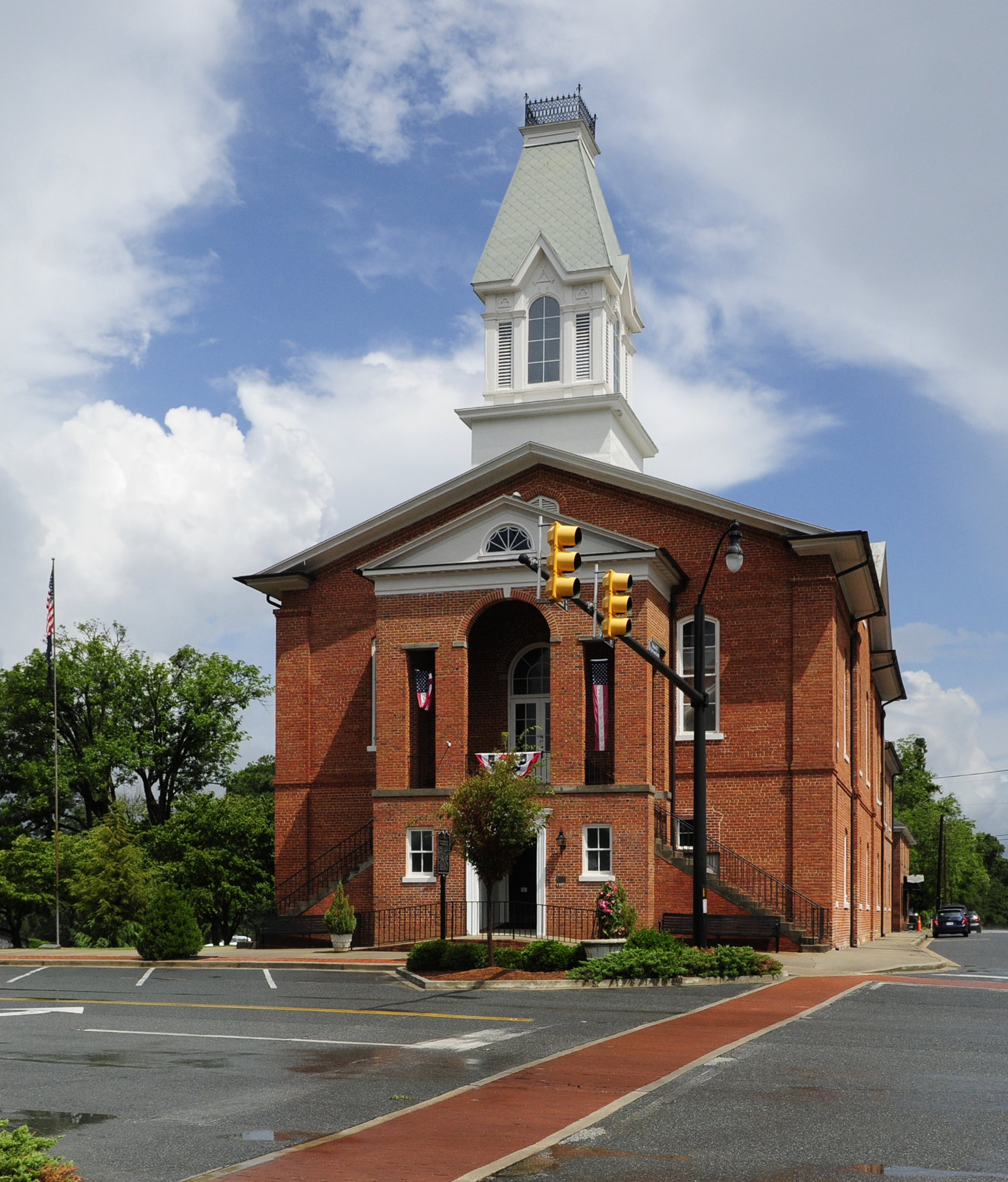
- Chesterfield Courthouse, East Main Street Historic District, August 2012

- Location within South Carolina Location within the United States
- Location: Hursey Dr., E. Main and Craig Sts., Chesterfield, South Carolina
- Coordinates: 34°44′09″N 80°04′58″W
- Area: 26 acres (11 ha)
- Built: c. 1798
- Architect: Simon, Louis; Et al.
- Architectural style: Mixed (more Than 2 Styles From Different Periods)
- MPS: Chesterfield MRA
- NRHP reference No.: 82003847
- Added to NRHP: May 4, 1982

East Main Street Historic District is a national historic district located at Chesterfield, Chesterfield County, South Carolina. The district encompasses 20 contributing buildings and 1 contributing site reflecting the development of the town of Chesterfield from about 1798 to 1937. The district contains some of Chesterfield's finest architectural expression and includes: the John Craig House, a hall-and-parlor farmhouse with excellent Federal style woodwork; the Chesterfield Courthouse with its Second Empire cupola; and several vernacular residences with Queen Anne and bungalow influence. The Chesterfield Post Office is a brick building designed by notable government architect Louis Simon. The original Chesterfield Courthouse, reputedly burned by General William T. Sherman’s troops in 1865, was the site of one of the state's earliest secession meetings. A marker on the grounds of the current Chesterfield Courthouse commemorates that meeting. The Craig Family cemetery, containing graves of members of one of Chesterfield's founding families, also is included in the district.

It was listed on the National Register of Historic Places in 1982.
