= WWMB =

Television station in Florence, South Carolina

ATSC 3.0 station
- Florence–Myrtle Beach, South Carolina; Lumberton, North Carolina; United States
- City: Florence, South Carolina
- Channels: Digital: 26 (UHF); Virtual: 21

Programming
- Affiliations: 21.1: Roar; for others, see § Subchannels

Ownership
- Owner: Sinclair Broadcast Group; (WWMB Licensee, LLC)
- Sister stations: WPDE-TV

History
- Founded: June 17, 1989
- First air date: September 21, 1994
- Former call signs: WFIL (1989–1990); WGRS (1990–1994)
- Former channel numbers: Analog: 21 (UHF, 1994–2009); Digital: 20 (UHF, 2006–2009), 21 (UHF, 2009–2019)
- Former affiliations: Independent (1994–1995); UPN (1995–2006); The CW (2006–2021); Dabl (2021–2025, now on 21.4)
- Call sign meaning: "We're Myrtle Beach"

Technical information
- Licensing authority: FCC
- Facility ID: 3133
- ERP: 655 kW
- HAAT: 581 m (1,906 ft)
- Transmitter coordinates: 34°22′3″N 79°19′48″W

Links
- Public license information: Public file; LMS

WWMB (channel 21) is a television station licensed to Florence, South Carolina, United States, serving the Pee Dee and Grand Strand regions of South Carolina with programming from the digital multicast network Roar. It is owned and operated by Sinclair Broadcast Group alongside dual ABC/CW affiliate WPDE-TV (channel 15, also licensed to Florence). The two stations share studios on University Boulevard in Conway; WWMB's transmitter is located on Pee Dee Church Road in Floydale, South Carolina.

== History ==
WWMB went on the air September 21, 1994, as an independent station. It was owned by Atlantic Media Group, but operated by Diversified Communications, then-owner of WPDE, under an LMA. It joined UPN as a charter affiliate on January 16, 1995. By 1999, WWMB was airing Access Hollywood starring Myrtle Beach native Nancy O'Dell. Barrington Broadcasting bought WPDE in 2006. At the same time, Atlantic Media Group sold WWMB to SagamoreHill Broadcasting, which continued the LMA with WPDE.

On January 24, 2006, Time Warner and CBS Corporation announced that the two networks they owned, The WB and UPN, would cease operations, and that those companies would combine their resources to create The CW. Just hours after the announcement, WPDE released a notice on its website indicating WWMB would become an affiliate of the new network. This notice was a little premature, as over the next two months, many announcements of network affiliation changes including station deals with The CW were made.

The existence of a cable-only WB affiliate, "WFWB", which was carried by area cable systems as part of The WB 100+ national cable service, made a CW affiliation for WWMB seem less of a sure thing. Nevertheless, WWMB made public on April 10 it had joined The CW.

At some point in 2006, the station signed on its original digital signal on UHF channel 20. WWMB's broadcasts became digital-only, effective June 12, 2009.

Even though WWMB aired CW programming on its individually-programmed main channel, it also operated a digital subchannel that carried the programming of The CW Plus, a similar national operation to The WB 100+. This resulted in the prime time schedules being identical. Despite this, the 21.2 subchannel did not inherit the cable channel slots of "WFWB", which were instead dropped.

On February 28, 2013, Barrington Broadcasting announced the sale of its entire group, including WWMB's LMA partner WPDE-TV, to Sinclair Broadcast Group. Since the LMA is included in the group deal, SagamoreHill would be selling the license assets of WWMB to Howard Stirk Holdings (owned by conservative commentator Armstrong Williams), with WPDE continuing to operate WWMB. The sale was finalized on November 22.

On August 12, 2025, Sinclair announced that it would acquire WWMB outright, creating a legal duopoly with WPDE. The sale was completed on December 1.

== Newscasts ==
In 1996, WWMB began airing the market's first prime time news on weeknights. Produced by WPDE, the show aired for thirty minutes and was originally called NewsChannel 15 at 10 on TV 21. It was initially anchored by Steve Hawley until late-1996 when he left the station. The program was then alternately hosted by Dave Gilbert and Tiffany Cochran. After the latter personality departed WPDE and Gilbert died in 1997, the show was renamed UPN 21 News at 10 and anchored by Leo Stallworth (later Audra Grant) until its cancellation in 2000.

In 2003, WPDE introduced another prime time newscast on WWMB under the title WPDE NewsChannel 15 at 10 on UPN. Now airing every night, it was anchored on weeknights by Jim Heath. The second generation of the show featured interactive segments such as "Say What?" and "Quick Hits" in a more fast-paced format. WWMB first got competition in 2004, when Fox affiliate WFXB entered into a news share agreement with WBTW. This partnership resulted in the area's second prime time broadcast at 10 seen weeknights for a half-hour. On September 18, 2006, with the launch of The CW, WPDE's production on WWMB changed its name to NewsChannel 15 at 10 on CW 21 and featured an updated graphics theme.

There was a further expansion of local newscasts in 2007 when WPDE added a third hour of its weekday Good Morning Carolinas broadcast to WWMB. This was seen from 7 to 8 a.m. and was the first local show to debut in the time slot and partially air against the national weekday morning show seen on the big three networks. For an unknown reason, the production was ultimately dropped.

On January 26, 2009, days after anchor Jim Heath left WPDE, WWMB's nightly 10 o'clock show was canceled. A repeat of NewsChannel 15 at 7 was subsequently added in its place on weeknights with live weather updates. Eventually, this program was dropped as well. WWMB airs a rebroadcast of WPDE's Carolina & Company Live in the weeknight 10:30 p.m. time slot. On August 19, 2013, WPDE revived the prime time newscast on WWMB called ABC 15 News on CW21 at 10pm. As of 2020, WWMB no longer airs a newscast, opting to air syndicated programming in its place.

== Subchannels ==
The station's ATSC 1.0 channels are carried on the multiplexed signals of other Florence–Myrtle Beach television stations:

Subchannels provided by WWMB (ATSC 1.0)
Channel	Res.	Short name	Programming	ATSC 1.0 host
21.1	720p	DABL	Roar	WBTW
21.2	480i	Charge!	Charge!	WPDE-TV
21.3	480i	TheNest	The Nest	WPDE-TV
21.4	480i	Charge!	Dabl	WHMC

=== ATSC 3.0 ===
Subchannels of WWMB (ATSC 3.0)
Channel	Short name	Programming
13.1	WBTW	CBS (WBTW)
15.1	WPDE	ABC (WPDE-TV)
15.10	T2	T2 (from Tennis Channel)
15.11	PBTV	Pickleballtv
15.20	GMLOOP	GameLoop
21.1	WWMB	Roar
23.1	WHMC	PBS (WHMC)
23.4	PBSKIDS	PBS Kids (WJPM-TV)

Subchannel broadcast with digital rights management
Subchannel streamed via the Internet

At 1:30 p.m. on September 20, 2021, WWMB switched to Dabl. The CW affiliation was moved to WPDE's second subchannel, but retained the "CW 21" branding. The national CW Plus feed on the second subchannel was dropped entirely.

On August 4, 2025, the station flipped to Roar.
