= Dr. Thomas E. Lucas House =

Historic house in South Carolina, United States

- U.S. National Register of Historic Places
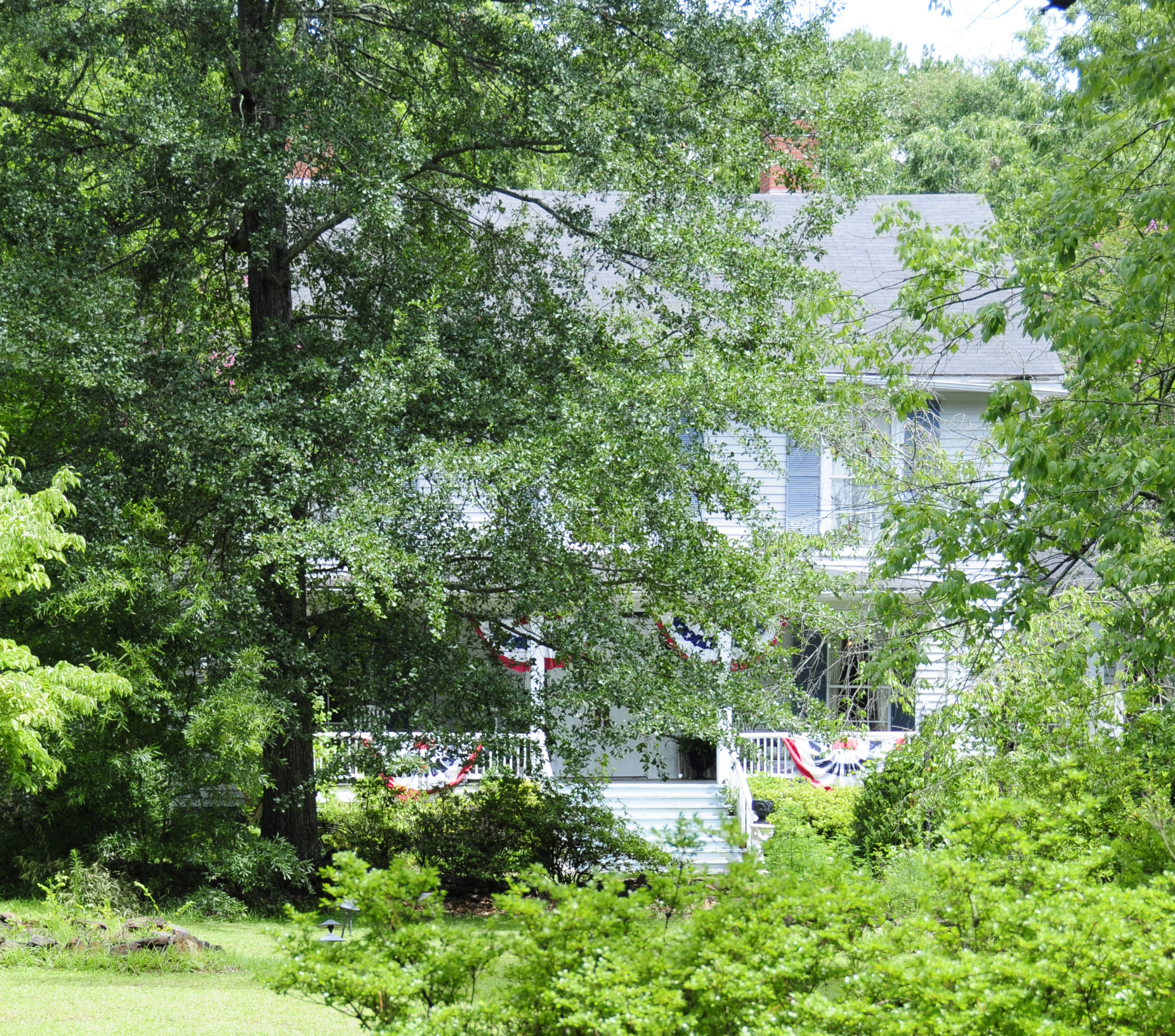
- Dr Thomas E Lucas House, August 2012

- Location within South Carolina Location within the United States
- Location: 716 W. Main St., Chesterfield, South Carolina
- Coordinates: 34°44′16″N 80°5′41″W
- Area: 4.4 acres (1.8 ha)
- Built: c. 1868
- Architectural style: Central-hall farmhouse
- MPS: Chesterfield MRA
- NRHP reference No.: 82003848
- Added to NRHP: May 4, 1982

Dr. Thomas E. Lucas House is a historic home located at Chesterfield, Chesterfield County, South Carolina. It was built about 1868, and is a two-story, three-bay, central-hall plan, frame farmhouse, with a one-story rear wing. It features a one-story porch across the front façade. Also on the property is an antebellum smokehouse, a gazebo (originally used as a hothouse, c. 1885), and several other outbuildings. The house is associated with Dr. Thomas E. Lucas, a farmer, physician and politician. In 1864 Lucas resigned his position as a lieutenant in Company A in the Fifteenth Battalion, South Carolina Artillery, to serve in the South Carolina House of Representatives.

It was listed on the National Register of Historic Places in 1982.
