= Pee Dee Creek (Missouri) =

Stream in the American state of Missouri

Coordinates: 39°43′58″N 91°46′29″W

Pee Dee Creek is a stream in Marion and Shelby counties in the U.S. state of Missouri. It is a tributary to the South Fork of the North River.

Pee Dee Creek most likely derives its name from the Pee Dee River in the Carolinas.

== See also ==
- List of rivers of Missouri
