= WPDE-TV =

Television station in Florence, South Carolina

- Florence–Myrtle Beach, South Carolina; Lumberton, North Carolina; United States
- City: Florence, South Carolina
- Channels: Digital: 27 (UHF); Virtual: 15
- Branding: ABC 15; CW 21 (on 15.2)

Programming
- Affiliations: 15.1: ABC; 15.2: The CW; for others, see § Subchannels

Ownership
- Owner: Sinclair Broadcast Group; (WPDE Licensee, LLC)
- Sister stations: WWMB

History
- First air date: November 22, 1980
- Former channel numbers: Analog: 15 (UHF, 1980–2009); Digital: 16 (UHF, until 2019)
- Call sign meaning: Pee Dee, a region served by the station

Technical information
- Licensing authority: FCC
- Facility ID: 17012
- ERP: 580 kW
- HAAT: 600 m (1,969 ft)
- Transmitter coordinates: 34°22′3″N 79°19′48″W

Links
- Public license information: Public file; LMS
- Website: wpde.com

WPDE-TV (channel 15) is a television station licensed to Florence, South Carolina, United States, serving the Pee Dee and Grand Strand regions of South Carolina as an affiliate of ABC and The CW. It is owned by Sinclair Broadcast Group alongside WWMB (channel 21, also licensed to Florence). The two stations share studios on University Boulevard in Conway; WPDE-TV's transmitter is located on Pee Dee Church Road in Floydale, South Carolina.

== History ==
On June 24, 1978, Eastern Carolinas Broadcasting, a group of primarily local investors, applied to the Federal Communications Commission (FCC) to build a new television station on channel 15 in Florence. The FCC granted the application and issued a construction permit to WPDE-TV on March 15, 1979. At the time, the area served by the station was still very rural, allowing Eastern Carolina Broadcasters to apply for a loan from the Farmers Home Administration. Ultimately, the company received nearly $2 million to renovate the former Florence Civic Coliseum on Cashua Drive into a main studio. The loan also enabled the construction of a 2,000-foot (610 m) tower at Dillon.

WPDE debuted on November 22, 1980. It gave Florence its second commercial television station after WBTW (channel 13). The station immediately took the ABC affiliation. The station was projected to provide ABC programming to 750,000 people that were unserved by that network. It was the first new commercial TV station in South Carolina since WCIV-TV started in Charleston in 1962 and the first for Florence since 1954. WBTW, a CBS affiliate, had aired some ABC programs in off-hours prior to WPDE's launch.

In May 1985, Diversified Communications of Portland, Maine, acquired WPDE-TV for $14.5 million. Over the course of the 1990s, the station shifted more and more resources toward the Myrtle Beach area. By 2000, more than half of its 70 employees were working in leased studio space there. In 2001, the station announced that it would move its Myrtle Beach employees and newscast production to a new facility in Conway which had previously housed bank offices.

Diversified had put WPDE-TV up for sale on two occasions. In 1993, it sought to sell the station as part of a liquidation of some assets; general manager Bill Christian reached an agreement to purchase it, but the deal fell through in 1994 after he could not put together financing. Citing interest from buyers, Diversified again put the station on the market in 2000.

WPDE was purchased by Barrington Broadcasting in 2006. WPDE's broadcasts became digital-only, effective June 12, 2009.

During the analog era, WPDE's over-the-air signal was spotty at best in much of the market, as was typical with most UHF stations at the time. In Myrtle Beach and Horry County, WPDE-TV competed with WWAY, the ABC affiliate in Wilmington, North Carolina; WWAY operated a Horry County news bureau until 1989, when it was closed after Nielsen moved Myrtle Beach from the Wilmington media market to the Florence market. To serve viewers without cable in Myrtle Beach, in the 1990s, WPDE-TV operated translator W68BZ (later WPDE-LP).

On February 28, 2013, Barrington announced the sale of its entire group, including WPDE-TV, to Sinclair Broadcast Group. The sale was completed on November 25.

== News operation ==
WPDE currently broadcasts 31 1/2 hours of news per week (including 5 1/2 hours each weekday and three hours each on Saturdays and Sundays). Staff members used to produce and anchor up to one hour of news per day for Savannah-based WTGS, which had a Georgia-based team of reporters and a weekday meteorologist, until Sinclair decided to end the WTGS newscasts on May 31, 2024, replacing them with The National Desk. Like the other two stations in the market, WPDE's news operation is split in two, with the majority of staff members working out of the Conway studios and a small bureau based on South Floyd Drive in Florence to cover the inland portion of the region.

For most of its history, WBTW was the dominant station in Florence–Myrtle Beach according to local Nielsen ratings. This is in part because that station essentially had the area to itself for over a quarter-century with the only real competition being Grade B signals from WECT in Wilmington and Columbia's WIS (both affiliates of NBC). WPDE's launch offered a second option of newscasts from WBTW. It was the first station in the market to move the majority of its operations to Horry County in 2002, a few years after setting up a weather studio in the Myrtle Beach Pavilion.

In March 2008, WBTW became the first station in the market to upgrade newscasts to 16:9 enhanced definition widescreen. Although not true high definition, broadcasts match the aspect ratio of HD television screens. Since its sign-on August 7, 2008, NBC affiliate WMBF-TV has been offering local news in full high definition. WPDE remained the last outlet with pillarboxed 4:3 standard definition news until October 26, 2010, when it upgraded to 16:9 enhanced definition widescreen. Corresponding with the change came a new set and updated graphics package.

On April 22, 2015, WPDE changed its longtime logo and branding from NewsChannel 15 to ABC 15, with its newscasts also being re-branded separately as ABC 15 News. To coincide with the re-branding, WPDE became the last major network station in the Florence–Myrtle Beach market to broadcast its local news in HD. The upgrade also came with a refresh to the studio and a new slogan.

Previously, weekdays at noon, WPDE aired a lifestyle/entertainment show called Carolina & Company Live. Airing in a magazine-type format from a secondary set, the broadcast was hosted by Cecil Chandler (formerly at WBTW for 36 years) and Amanda Sellers. During the program, there were various interview segments and business spotlights. WPDE began offering newscasts at 5 and 5:30 in 2016. It maintains partnerships with local radio stations WTKN FM 94.5, WRNN-FM 99.5, WWRK AM 970, and WWHK AM 1450.

During Hurricane Florence in September 2018, WPDE simulcast its coverage on sister station WCTI-TV after that station was knocked off the air by flood waters. WCTI reporters were eventually able to contribute to the newscasts from equipment field crews carried with them. WPDE remained in wall-to-wall coverage for 50 total hours during and after the storm and was broadcast to eastern North Carolina homes for days.

In April 2020, the station became the first in the market to produce a dedicated Spanish-language segment. Called Trabajando Por Ti (the Spanish translation of the station's slogan), it was anchored by Simon Williams with occasional contributions by other Spanish-speaking staff members. The five-minute segment is digital-only and is produced on Saturdays.

The station's studios on most weeks originate the weekly national public affairs program The Right Side with Armstrong Williams, which is aired by most Sinclair stations; Williams, a political commentator, holds an interest in WPDE's parent Sinclair Broadcast Group, including purchasing several stations through them via his holding company Howard Stirk Holdings, which holds the license and transmitting facilities for WWMB.

=== WWMB ===
In 1996, sister station WWMB began airing the market's first prime time news on weeknights. Produced by WPDE, the show aired for thirty minutes and was originally known as NewsChannel 15 at 10 on TV 21. It was initially anchored by Steve Hawley until late-1996 when he left the station. The program was then alternately hosted by Dave Gilbert and Tiffany Cochran. After the latter personality departed WPDE and Gilbert died in 1997, the show was renamed UPN 21 News at 10 and anchored by Leo Stallworth (later Audra Grant) until its cancellation in 2000. In 2003, WPDE introduced another prime time newscast on WWMB under the title WPDE NewsChannel 15 at 10 on UPN. Now airing every night, it was anchored on weeknights by Jim Heath. This second generation of the show featured interactive segments such as "Say What?" and "Quick Hits" in a more fast-paced format.

WWMB began having competition to its broadcast in 2004 when Fox affiliate WFXB (channel 43) entered into a news share agreement with WBTW. This partnership resulted in the area's second prime time broadcast at 10 seen weeknights for a half-hour. On September 18, 2006, with the launch of The CW, WPDE's production on WWMB became known as NewsChannel 15 at 10 on CW 21 and featured an updated graphics theme. There was a further expansion of local newscasts in 2007 when WPDE added a third hour of its weekday Good Morning Carolinas broadcast to WWMB. This was seen from 7 until 8 and was the first local show to debut in the time slot and partially air against the national weekday morning show seen on the big three networks. For an unknown reason, the production was ultimately dropped.

On January 26, 2009, days after anchor Jim Heath left WPDE, WWMB's nightly 10 o'clock show was canceled. A repeat of NewsChannel 15 at 7 was subsequently added in its place on weeknights with live weather updates. Eventually, this program was dropped as well. WWMB airs a rebroadcast of WPDE's Carolina & Company Live in the weeknight 10:30 p.m. time slot. On August 19, 2013, WPDE revived a weeknight prime time newscast on WWMB called The CW21 News At 10, which lasted a few years before ending.

=== Notable former on-air staff ===
- Nancy O'Dell
- Stuart Scott

== Subchannels ==
The station's signal is multiplexed:

Subchannels of WPDE-TV
Subchannel	Res.	Short name	Programming
15.1	720p	ABC	ABC
15.2	720p	CW	The CW
15.3	480i	Comet	Comet
15.4	480i	Weather	Local weather
21.2	480i	Charge!	Charge! (WWMB)
21.3	480i	TheNest	The Nest (WWMB)

Broadcast on behalf of another station

On September 20, 2021, WWMB's CW affiliation moved to WPDE's second subchannel and retained the "CW 21" branding.
