= Production diary =

A production diary is a live account of the making of a film for promotional purposes in the form of a video podcast. Production diaries follow different aspects of movie production while they are happening. Web-based production diaries are a new way for film makers to publicize their productions as they are being created, rather than when they are released (the old-model of film marketing). It is a detailed process of production of your film. In it you write your ideas and how would you execute your ideas and what resources would be needed along with equipment, actors, location recce and much more.

Examples of current web-based production diaries include:

- King Kong (2005) - KongisKing.net
- Superman Returns - BlueTights.net
- Nacho Libre - nacholibre.com (xml feed)
