= Patrick station (Seaboard Air Line Railway) =

- Seaboard Air Line Railway Depot in Patrick
- U.S. National Register of Historic Places
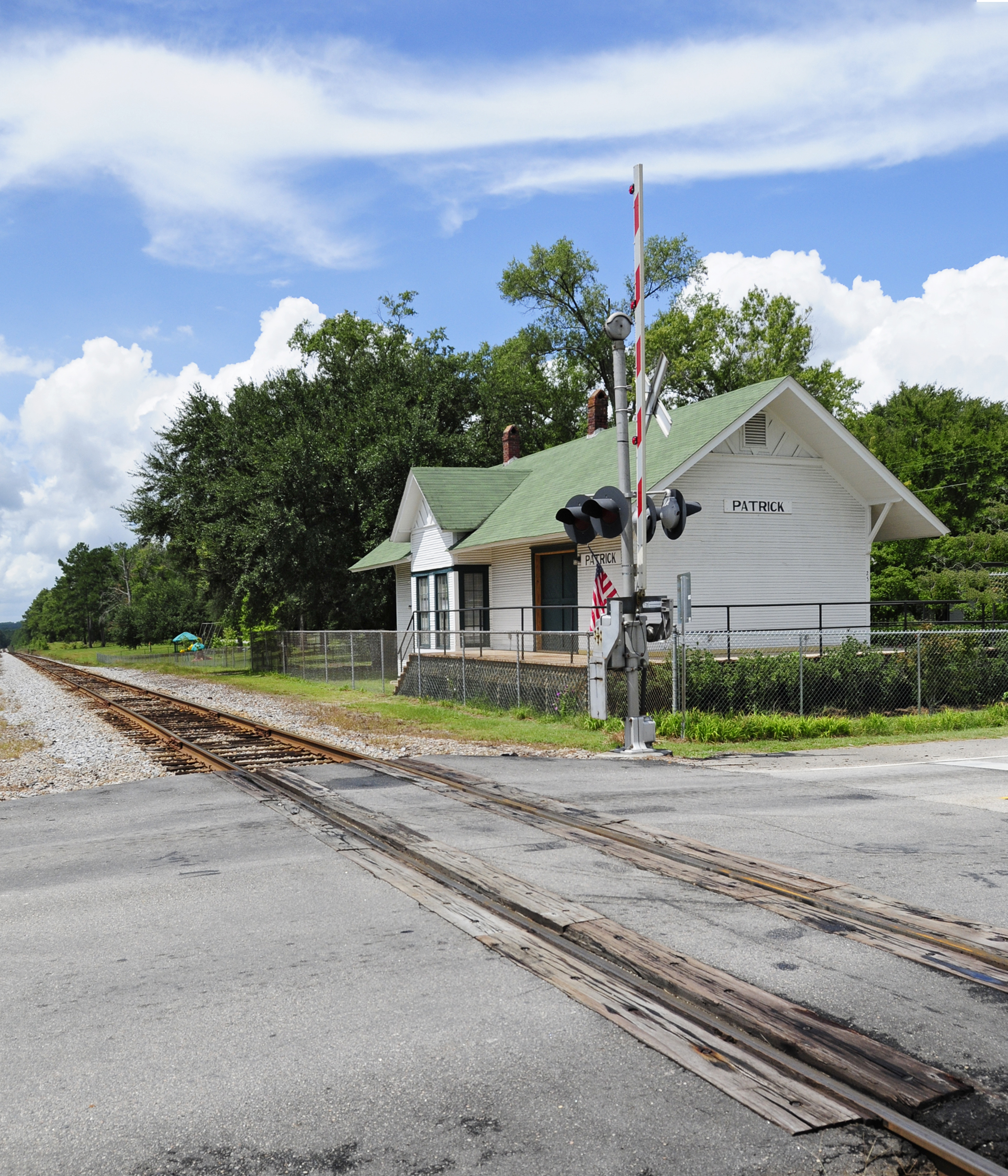
- Seaboard Air Line Railway Depot in Patrick, August 2012

- Location within South Carolina Location within the United States
- Location: Winburn St., S of jct. of SC 102 and US 1, Patrick, South Carolina
- Coordinates: 34°34′36″N 80°2′34″W
- Area: less than one acre
- Built: 1900
- NRHP reference No.: 99000100
- Added to NRHP: February 22, 1999

Seaboard Air Line Railway Depot in Patrick is a historic train station located at Patrick, Chesterfield County, South Carolina, United States. It was built in 1900 by the Seaboard Air Line Railroad, and is a 1 1/2-story frame building with a simple rectangular plan. It has a moderately pitched gable roof with two small, red brick chimneys at its peak. It had served as a flag stop for the Seaboard Air Line's Palmland,

It was listed on the National Register of Historic Places in 1999.

Preceding station	Seaboard Air Line Railroad	Following station
Middendorf toward Tampa or Miami	Main Line	Cheraw toward Richmond
