= Chesterfield, South Carolina =

Town in South Carolina, United States

- Town
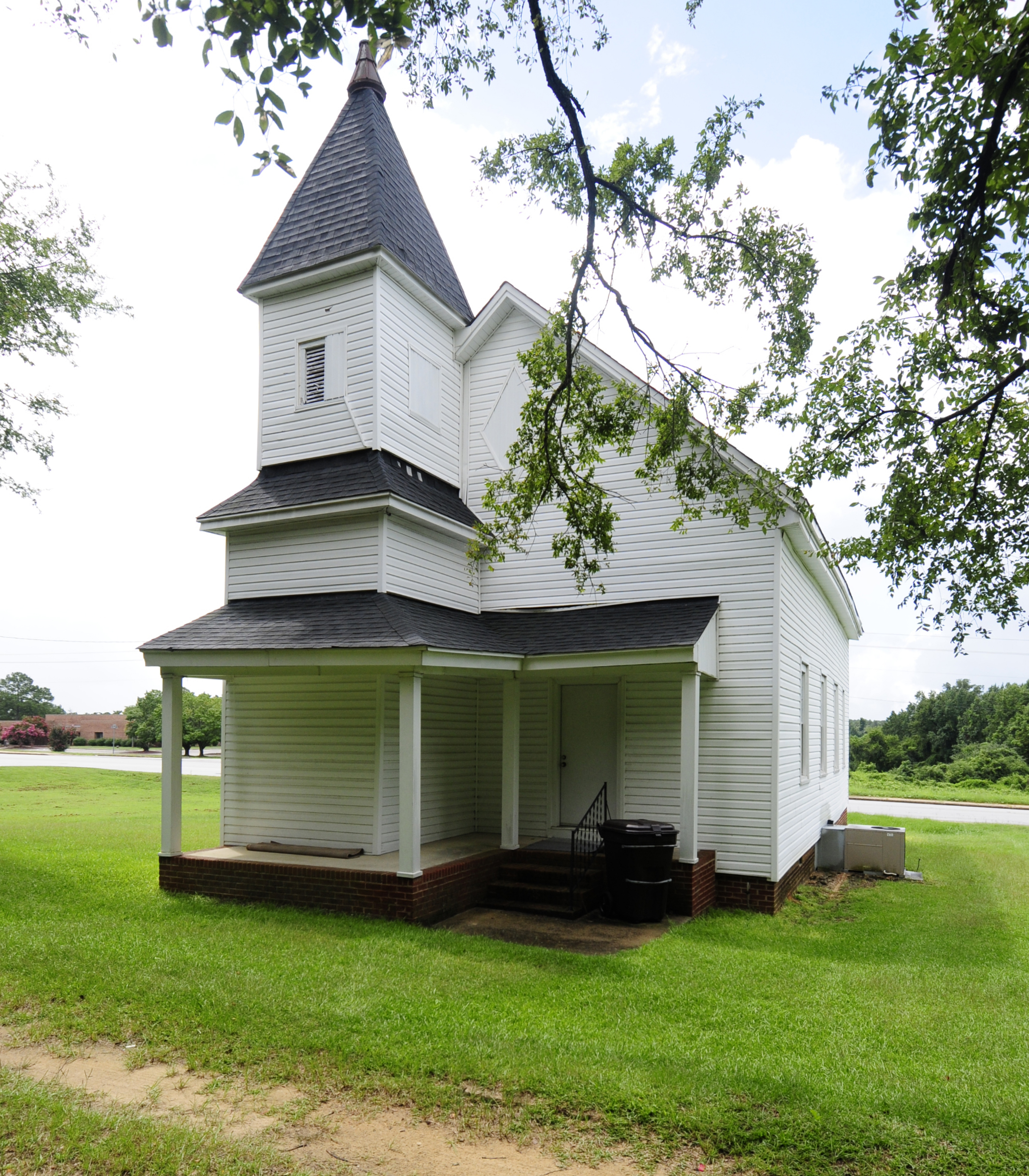
- Mount Tabor United Methodist Church, pictured in August 2012

- Seal
- Nickname: The Heart of the Carolinas
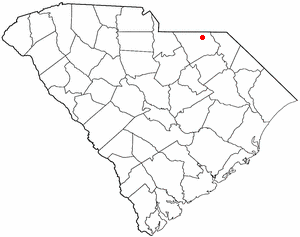
- Location of Chesterfield, South Carolina
- Coordinates: 34°43′59″N 80°04′41″W
- Country: United States
- State: South Carolina
- County: Chesterfield

Area
  - Total: 4.08 sq mi (10.56 km^{2})
  - Land: 4.08 sq mi (10.56 km^{2})
  - Water: 0 sq mi (0.00 km^{2})
- Elevation: 285 ft (87 m)

Population (2020)
  - Total: 1,357
  - Density: 332.7/sq mi (128.45/km^{2})
- Time zone: UTC-5 (Eastern (EST))
  - Summer (DST): UTC-4 (EDT)
- ZIP code: 29709
- Area codes: 843, 854
- FIPS code: 45-14140
- GNIS feature ID: 2406265
- Website: chesterfield-sc.com

Chesterfield is a town in Chesterfield County, South Carolina, United States. The population was 1,357 as of the 2020 census. It is the county seat of Chesterfield County, and least populous of all South Carolina county seats.

== History ==
The East Main Street Historic District, Dr. Thomas E. Lucas House, and West Main Street Historic District are listed on the National Register of Historic Places, supervised by the National Park Service of the U.S. Department of the Interior.

== Geography ==
Chesterfield is located in northeastern Chesterfield County. According to the United States Census Bureau, the town has a total area of 4.1 square miles (10.5 km^{2}), all land.

South Carolina Highway 9 passes through the town, leading east 12 miles (19 km) to Cheraw and west 19 miles (31 km) to Pageland. South Carolina Highway 145 crosses SC 9 near the center of town, leading southwest 21 miles (34 km) to McBee and northeast 10 miles (16 km) to Morven, North Carolina. South Carolina Highway 102 leads south from Chesterfield 12 miles (19 km) to Patrick.

== Demographics ==
Historical population
Census	Pop.	Note	%±
1900	308		—
1910	618		100.6%
1920	856		38.5%
1930	1,030		20.3%
1940	1,263		22.6%
1950	1,530		21.1%
1960	1,532		0.1%
1970	1,667		8.8%
1980	1,432		−14.1%
1990	1,373		−4.1%
2000	1,318		−4.0%
2010	1,472		11.7%
2020	1,357		−7.8%
U.S. Decennial Census

=== 2020 census ===
Chesterfield racial composition
Race	Num.	Perc.
White (non-Hispanic)	882	65.0%
Black or African American (non-Hispanic)	384	28.3%
Native American	3	0.22%
Asian	6	0.44%
Other/Mixed	64	4.72%
Hispanic or Latino	18	1.33%

As of the 2020 United States census, there were 1,357 people, 571 households, and 406 families residing in the town.

=== 2000 census ===
As of the census of 2000, there were 1472 people, 597 households, and 358 families residing in the town. The population density was 383.2 inhabitants per square mile (148.0/km^{2}). There were 683 housing units at an average density of 198.6 per square mile (76.7/km^{2}). The racial makeup of the town was 64.64% White, 34.67% African American, 0.15% Native American, 0.09% Asian, 0.29% from other races, and 0.15% from two or more races. Hispanic or Latino of any race were 0.83% of the population.

There were 597 households, out of which 28.1% had children under the age of 18 living with them, 38.5% were married couples living together, 19.8% had a female householder with no husband present, and 39.9% were non-families. 37.2% of all households were made up of individuals, and 17.8% had someone living alone who was 65 years of age or older. The average household size was 2.19 and the average family size was 2.86.

In the town, the population was spread out, with 23.2% under the age of 18, 7.7% from 18 to 24, 25.7% from 25 to 44, 24.9% from 45 to 64, and 18.5% who were 65 years of age or older. The median age was 41 years. For every 100 females, there were 81.5 males. For every 100 females age 18 and over, there were 73.0 males.

The median income for a household in the town was $25,833, and the median income for a family was $36,806. Males had a median income of $31,488 versus $20,625 for females. The per capita income for the town was $16,481. About 19.7% of families and 23.7% of the population were below the poverty line, including 39.0% of those under age 18 and 22.2% of those age 65 or over.

== Education ==
Chesterfield has a public library, a branch of the Chesterfield County Library System.

Home offices for the Chesterfield County School District are located in the town. Chesterfield is served by 3 schools in the district:

- Edwards Elementary School (grades K-5)
- Chesterfield-Ruby Middle School (grades 6-8)
- Chesterfield High School (grades 9-12)

== Geology ==
The "great syenite dyke" extends from Hanging Rock through Taxahaw to the Brewer and Edgeworth mine in Chesterfield.

== See also ==
- National Register of Historic Places listings in Chesterfield County, South Carolina
