= Diversified Communications Tower =

Communication tower

Coordinates: 34°22′3″N 79°19′48″W

Diversified Communications Tower is a 2000-foot guyed mast for TV transmission in Floydale, South Carolina, United States. Diversified Communications Tower was built in 1981 and is 609.6 meters high. The tower itself is 585.6 meters; the antenna is 24 meters. It is one of the tallest structures in the United States. The Diversified Communications Tower broadcasts the signals of local ABC affiliate WPDE and CW affiliate WWMB; the tower is named after Diversified Communications, WPDE's previous owner.

== See also ==
- WPDE
- Tallest structures in the U.S.
- List of the world's tallest structures
