= Pee Dee Area Council =

Former local council of Boy Scouts of America

- Owner: Boy Scouts of America
- Location: northeastern South Carolina
- Country: United States
- Founded: July 1928
- Defunct: August 1st, 2022
- Website https://www.peedeescouts.org/

The Pee Dee Area Council was a Boy Scouts organization located in northeastern South Carolina. The Indian Waters Council headquartered in Columbia, SC absorbed the council on August 1, 2022. The combined council, Indian Waters Council #553 continues to operate Camp Coker, and maintain an office in Florence, SC.

== Organization ==
- Atakwa District
- Chicora District
- Great Northern District
- Henry Shelor District

The Pee Dee Area Council Boy Scouts of America was founded in July 1928 with William E. Czarnitzki as the first Scout Executive. The council office was in the city hall in Darlington until it moved to Florence in the 1930s. Czarnitzki left the Pee Dee Area Council to take the job of Scout Executive of the Central South Carolina Council in his home town of Columbia c. March 1930.

== Camp Coker ==
Camp Coker
- Location: Society Hill, South Carolina
- Website https://peedeescouts.org

Camp Coker is a Boy Scout Camp located just outside Society Hill, South Carolina. Camp Coker is operated by the Pee Dee Area Council. The fully accredited Camp Coker offers programs and activities including COPE, aquatics, canoeing, rowing, sailing, kayaking, handicrafts, rifle shooting, shotgun shooting, archery, ecology and environmental science, fishing, natural sciences, Scoutcraft, and Trailblazers (emphasis on Tenderfoot-to-First Class skills). Camp Coker is a year-round facility. In addition to the Boy Scout summer camp program held June to August each year, Camp Coker host a variety of events, from unit camping opportunities to training courses, Wood Badge, Council events, District events, and Order of the Arrow functions.

=== History ===
==== Camp Pee Dee ====
Czarnitzki returned to Camp Coker for the council anniversary camporee in November 1978. He and Wilbert H. Bernshouse (10 September 1913 – 26 July 2007) from Sumter were the only people from 1929 at the camporee in 1978.

According to the 1941 Camp Coker bulletin, the question of how the site for Camp Coker was chosen is answered by a story about a good pot of fish stew. The bulletin recounts that a group of men from Darlington were out looking for a site to be used by the Boy Scouts for camping. The men traveled to a grist mill dam on Spot Mill Creek near Society Hill. They had come for a fish stew but later decided that the land looked ideal for the camp site they had been searching for. The grist mill building was still there in 1943 but was torn down sometime after that.

Soon after the trip buildings were constructed as the site was developed. The original camp was built on 80 acres (320,000 m^{2}) and called Camp Pee Dee after the name of the council. "Pee Dee" is the name of an Indian tribe from the area as well as a regional name for this part of the state. The Great Pee Dee River flows just miles from the camp. The Little Pee Dee River also flows through the council's geographic area.

The camp was located on the site of an old plantation. Spot Mill Creek runs through the heart of this site. In the 19th century a dam was built to form a pond for a grist mill. Turpentine was also extracted from some of the tall pine trees on the land.

In the original camp there were several buildings. The boys stayed in one of six screened-in cabins, each housing eight campers with four sets of bunk beds. The cabins were given names after famous Native American tribes such as the Apache, Sioux, Iroquois, Cherokee, Navajo and Seminole. In addition, there was one cabin for the cooks. The camp director, W. E. Czarnitzki, also had a cabin near the entrance to camp that served as an office. The cabins were screened in with canvas that could be dropped down in case of rain. They also had a front porch that extended out a couple of feet.

The other original buildings at Camp Pee Dee were the dining hall and the handicraft lodge. The dining hall was built by men from Darlington in 1929. It was erected on a hill overlooking the cabins. It was a wooden building on stilts over uneven ground. Water came up to the dining hall from an electric pump located near the road. This dining hall was used through the 1951 camping season. It was torn down to make way for the new dining hall. The new dining hall opened for the 1952 camping season and was constructed on a concrete slab after the top of the hill had been graded to an even surface.

The Handicraft Lodge was located just below the cabins on a hill. Many projects were completed in the Handicraft Lodge. Among those that the boys worked on were leather vests, along with sets of bows and arrows. The Handicraft Lodge and the Ecology hut are the only 1929 buildings that are still there in 2006.

Camp Pee Dee opened officially on July 1, 1929. Boys from Darlington, Sumter, and Bennettsville were the first to use the camp with a total of about 40 boys in camp. The flag pole was located on a hill above the dining hall and the cabins. The boys assembled outside their cabins for flag ceremonies. The swimming area was located right off of the dam. A pier was constructed for use and a platform was built in the water for diving.

The camp newspaper, called the Pine Needles, reports a lot of the activities that were going on in camp. Morning inspections were conducted by Sgt. Murrel Rose of Fort Jackson with the Cherokee Cabin and the boys from Sumter being five-time winners. The paper reports there were no cases of homesickness, although staff members Marion Yates and Dana Crosland were cited for love sickness. The best fisherman of the season was C. C. Griffen of Troop 14 in Bennettsville. He was responsible for landing three big jackfish in one day and causing a big stir in camp during the second week. A whole host of weekly individual awards were given out including biggest grouch, biggest eater, sloppiest Scout, funniest Scout, and the biggest "sheik" to name a few.

===== Camp Pee Dee becomes Camp Coker =====
The name of the council camp was changed from Camp Pee Dee to Camp Coker before the summer of 1932 in memory of Charles Westfield Coker, of Hartsville, South Carolina. He was President of the Southern Novelty Company (now Sonoco Products Company) from 1918 until his death in the fall of 1931. The lake in the center of camp is named Lake Westwood in honor of Charles Westfield Coker and Joseph Norwood. Joseph Norwood was a developer who took the 2,000-acre (8.1 km^{2}) Cox Plantation and subdivided it into lots in the year 1915. One of those lots of 80 acres (320,000 m^{2}) was the original land for the camp.

Improvements to the camp followed at a steady rate. A map made in 1940 shows that among the new additions were a first aid lodge, the long house, a campfire ring, and a bridge to the island in the lake. The camp latrines were given affectionate names. Wilbert Bernshouse recalls that in 1943 they were called Egypt, because "that's where the pyramids are". In 1944 he recalls them being called linen closets because everyone took their sheets there.

Camp Coker has gone through a number of different stages of growth from the original buildings in the summer of 1929 to what the camp looks like today. Many activities that boys at Camp Pee Dee enjoyed like swimming, archery, and handicrafts are still the foundation for the modern Camp Coker program. Although the activities are similar, the buildings have changed. By using old photographs and maps it is possible to construct a sort of historical tour of Camp Coker.

There have been several waves of construction at Camp Coker. There are also three corresponding types of architecture that can be seen at camp. These waves were the original construction, development in the early 1950s and development between 1962 and 1963. There are some buildings at camp today which do not fall into these waves. Among these buildings are the old winter cabin (built in 1941 and later called the camp office), the shooting sports buildings, and the Shaw Training Center.

Bill Stallworth (1919–2005) became the PDAC Scout executive on January 1, 1952. He had previously served the council as a Field Scout Executive (now called District Executive). He initiated the construction of several buildings at camp. The style of architecture used was basically concrete block. The current dining hall (1952) was one of these buildings. It was constructed of concrete block and had a porch on the end. A storage building now called the warehouse was built behind the dining hall. Directly beside it was a shower building which was the only one in camp. This structure now serves as a paint shed.

A string of buildings was built along the road adjacent to the winter cabin. Among these additions was a trading post (1954), health lodge (1952) and the director's cabin. A new dock was built at the waterfront along with a bridge leading to the swimming area from the central part of camp. Many troop camp sites were improved. A caretaker's house was built prior to camp in 1951. (Hartsville Messenger, June 1951) This caretaker's house was later moved up the hill and across the road and the present ranger's house was built c. 1962 – 63. William Lucas Shoemake (1916–1992) became the first full-time ranger in November 1962 and served through the summer of 1981. Mr. Shoemake was a fine Christian man who was greatly admired by the Camp Coker Staff. He was the only person to ever be granted a lifetime membership in Santee Lodge 116.

The camp was changed significantly in the 1950s when a sand causeway was built across the lake. A small bridge linked the causeway to the shore on the main side of camp. This bridge was replaced by a bigger, nicer bridge in the 1962-63 renovations that was high enough for rowboats and canoes to pass underneath. The bridge and causeway made the other side of the lake more accessible and it was no longer necessary to walk all the way around the lake to get to the other side. The wooden 1962-63 bridge was replaced by a bridge with steel supports and rails in 1993.

The swimming area at camp during the 1950s featured a "T Dock" and had the canoes docked at the swimming area. A diving platform was also located a little further out from the dock. The current dock has been in the shape of an "F" since the 1970s. There is also a floating dock further out in deeper water. Swimming at Camp Coker is done in Lake Westwood. There has never been a swimming pool at Camp Coker. Camp Coker used to have a marathon in which troops competed in a foot race, archery, rifle, obstacle course, rowing, canoeing, and swimming. The marathon began at the spillway and ended in the nearby swimming area so a spectator in that vicinity could see the beginning and the end of the marathon. Another program feature for adult leaders in camp was the greased watermelon where adults tried to put a greased watermelon into a canoe in the nonswimmers area. The sight of adults trying to hold on to a slippery greased watermelon provided many laughs. Another program feature for boys was the war canoes in which boys went in the lake in two canoes with fire buckets but no paddles. The object was to swamp the other canoe by bailing water into it.

===== 1960s =====
The 1962-63 Construction at Camp Stallworth helped organize another big capital funds campaign for the camp in the early 1960s. He called on Pee Dee companies and private donors to pledge money and adopt a campsite or building to improve camp. All this was possible because attendance at camp was up with all of the baby boomers reaching Scout age. Overall membership in Scouting was up and Stallworth was able to harness this growth and use it to really create the modern Camp Coker.

Construction at camp took place during the winter of 1962–1963. Everything from the parking lot to the island got changed during this period. A front lawn was created with flag poles and a stone sign built to make the entrance into camp impressive. The parking lot was moved to above the lawn. A welcome shelter with men's and women's toilet facilities was built on the lawn. It was named Stallworth Lodge in honor of Mr. Stallworth who was the driving force behind the campaign.

The style of architecture used for the new buildings was board and batten. A new changing house was built near the swimming area. The swimming area had a lookout tower that was similar to ones used in other camps. A new boat house with concrete boat docks for both sail boats and row boats was constructed between the camp office and the director's cabin. The dining hall also got a new side porch. A buttress for the dining hall was built in 1977-78 and an extension to the buttress was added in 1987–88. Central shower facilities were built on each side of the lake in the 1960s.

The other major phase of the construction was the development of the modern campsites. The Belk Foundation, of Belk department store fame, financed a new camp site on the island and the name of the island was changed to Belk Island. The island had previously been known to some campers as "Boney Finger Island" which came from a ghost story about a fictional character named Herman Van Glotch.

Many of the new campsites were on the west side of the lake. The new Burlington campsite (dedicated in 1981) was named after Burlington industries which had a big plant (now called Swift Galey) in Society Hill. Cayce campsite was supported by the Cayce family of Florence in honor of Frank Cayce who died in a parachute accident while at The Citadel, the military college of South Carolina. Prior to this the site was just called lake side. Cayce campsite had an unusual pine tree called the "witch's tree" from another ghost story. The branches of the tree went out and up and it was very unusual. It was cut down prior to the summer of 1978. John Holliday of Galivants Ferry was a long time council supporter and Holliday campsite was named after him. Campsite inspections were conducted by the two camp staff commissioners. There were two commissioners, one on each side of the lake. Each commissioner inspected the campsites on his side of the lake. Some troops were more diligent than others in keeping a clean campsite.

This was the last major renovation of Camp Coker. Almost all of the things built by Stallworth and the supporters of the campaign in the early 1960s remain. Some buildings have been added in the thirty plus years following the camp redevelopment plan. Most of them were donated by families in honor of someone.

===== Later construction =====
The shooting sports program area of camp has been developed since the early 1970s. The Hackett Rifle Range was built in 1974 in honor of Harley B. Hackett of Florence who was a former Santee Lodge member. He was shot down while flying a mission in Southeastern Asia in 1968. The Doug Sprague archery building was built in 1986 after he was killed in a robbery at Columbia Mall in Columbia, SC. Doug had been a Camp Coker staff member for five years in his youth. His father Bill Sprague (1918–2004), was Chairman of the Council Camping Committee in 1986. Mr. Sprague had also served the PDAC as a Scoutmaster, OA lodge adviser, and council president.

The Shaw Training Center was built in honor of Charlie Shaw in 1988. This modern building has several bedrooms, two full bathrooms, a kitchen and a large meeting room. Often this is used as the site of district committee meetings and other functions. Camp staff members have nicknamed the building the "Camp Coker Hilton".

The Copenhaver family of Hartsville donated money for a new campsite and renovation of the camp chapel in 1983. Copenhaver campsite and chapel were named in memory of Dr. James E. Copenhaver (1896–1982). He was the director of chemical research at Sonoco Products Company in Hartsville. He had previously been a chemistry professor at the University of South Carolina. Dr. Copenhaver was a longtime supporter of the Pee Dee Area Council. He was a former council president and was the second PDAC Scouter to receive the Silver Antelope award. Copenhaver chapel and campsite is located near the causeway just down from the rifle range. It also included a new screen shelter.

In 1990 Henry B. Moree of Society Hill donated money for a campsite in his name which was built above Holliday campsite. In 1987 Moree purchased most of the property across the paved road from camp and constructed a hunting preserve and motocross racetrack on the land.

Camp Coker has seen additional improvements in recent years. Santee Lodge was responsible for a new toilet house located between the Dining Hall and Council Ring. This facility was badly needed because at the time there were no good restroom facilities near the dining hall. The only toilet in the dining hall was reserved for the cooks and it got aggravated when flushed too many times. The lodge received a matching grant from the National Order of the Arrow to assist in its construction. A new sewage system was installed for the entire camp when the new restrooms were built. A new shower building was also added on each side of the lake replacing the central showers from the 1960s. A new campsite for the staff with toilets, sinks, showers, and washing machines was added between the warehouse and the council ring. This campsite has many small sleeping cabins that are called "birdhouses".

Santee Lodge 116 also paid for the first component of the newly developed C.O.P.E. course at camp by funding the zip line tower. At the time the council was in a rush to get the course underway to meet a deadline for new and stricter regulations. The lodge executive committee agreed to pay several thousand dollars to have the main poles used in the tower treated. Later the zipline and other components of the C.O.P.E. (Challenging Outdoor Physical Experience) course were added.

===== Dining =====
Camp Coker had a reputation for having excellent food. Mrs. Flora Bull (1922–2007) of Darlington, SC, was first hired by Camp Director Walter S. "Anky" Carter (1925–1994) in 1954. She cooked for the schools in Darlington and at Camp Coker from 1954 to 1980 and 1982–88. Flora's fried chicken was one of the favorite meals. She made dinner rolls from scratch that campers and staff members called "moon rocks". The "moon rocks" were served with a plate of butter. Ice water and iced tea were the usual drinks for meals along with Kool-Aid that was called "bug juice". Orange juice, milk, and coffee for adults were served for breakfast.

Food at Camp Coker was served family style and boys took turns being the waiter and assistant waiter. Food was served in bowls and eaten on real plates with metal forks, knives, and spoons. Dishes were washed after each meal and disposable utensils were not used. Boys who served as waiters and assistant waiters were responsible for setting the tables and cleaning up afterwards. This taught them the value of teamwork and responsibility. The end porch on the dining hall has a bell that was used to signal the waiters to come to the dining hall to set the tables.

Flora did not waste anything and her skills were one of the reasons why excellent food was served within a reasonable budget. This included making good soup out of leftovers. She made sweet rolls from scratch that were usually served on Saturday mornings before camp ended. She made delicious cookies from U.S. Department of Agriculture peanut butter. Her chili and rice, grilled cheese sandwiches, and macaroni and cheese were made from scratch. Leftover butter was melted and put into refrigerated molds to be used again. Her scrambled eggs were made from real eggs that were cracked out of the shell. Staff members would sit with troops when seats were available and this facilitated interaction between the staff and the campers. Scout songs were usually sung after meals led by a member of the staff. The interior light fixtures in the dining hall resemble wagon wheels. Flags from previous Pee Dee Area Council National Jamboree troops were hung from the rafters in the dining hall. Two "awards" that were sometimes presented in the dining hall were the loving cup and the pigs trough for the cleanest and messiest tables.

== Santee Lodge ==
Santee Lodge
- Lodge Chief: Gabe Gainey
- Lodge Adviser: Kenneth McIver
- Staff Adviser: Michael Hesbach
- Website http://www.santee116.com

Among the requests received for Order of the Arrow Charters by the National Boy Scouts of America in 1938 one was postmarked Florence, South Carolina. Apparently, Mr. Rucker Newbery had inspired local Scouts to become part of the rapidly growing organization of honor campers. The lodge chartered to the Pee Dee Council was the 116th Order of the Arrow Lodge. After a selection period, the name "Santee" was settled upon and duly registered with BSA. The lodge grew slowly, suffering numerous difficulties, which eventually led to a return visit by Mr. Newbery to reorganize the group. After his return, the lodge began to expand and become more involved in the Order and service to the Pee Dee Area Council. The Carolina parakeet became the official lodge totem at some point before the first patch was issued in 1955; just before Santee Lodge hosted the Dixie Fellowship for the first time. The actual bird used on the patch was adapted from the Audubon painting of Carolina parakeets. At this time, the patch sold for fifty cents. At approximately the same time, the first newsletter was published. Its name, The Santee Arrowman, has survived the years and still remains as the title of the current newsletter.

On February 28, 1958, the lodge held its first Winter Banquet. Banquets have been held at a variety of locations including Marion, several meeting rooms in Florence, Darlington, Hartsville, Cheraw, Conway and Sumter. Featured speakers have included the world's strongest man – Paul Anderson, National Order of the Arrow Chiefs Brad Starr and Jeff Herrmann, American Indian specialists, and many military, political and community leaders, including Lt. Governor Nick Theodore in 1992. A special feature of the banquet is the presentation of the Santee Lodge Red Arrow Awards for outstanding contributions by non-Arrowmen and Founder's Awards to one or two brothers who have given outstanding service and example to the lodge.

The lodge's primary functions are its fellowships, held in the fall, spring, and the end of summer camp. These events have varied in dates and occasionally in location. The Spring Fellowship in March 1963 was held at the Myrtle Beach Air Force Base. Over the years, the main purposes of these weekends were the induction of new Ordeal members, conducting the Brotherhood and Vigil Honor Ceremonies, and service projects. Like most lodges, Santee Lodge is closely tied to its summer camp, and it spends a great deal of time helping to make improvements to Camp Coker. These projects have included preparatory and repair work to campsites, the re-roofing and repair of many buildings, the construction, maintenance and improvements to the Council Ring and COPE Course, construction of the Dining Hall buttress, restrooms, basketball court and archery and rifle ranges, and numerous bridges, check dams and trails.

Santee was the first lodge to conduct an OA member's only week of summer camp. The tradition began about 1958 when Arrowmen were encouraged to attend the last week of camp to present a special parent's night program. In the 1960s, original scripts were written as the parent's night program evolved into a full-scale production. Since 1969, only OA members have attended the last week of summer camp with the lodge offering a special program of merit badge sessions and activities. It is at this time that most Ordeal candidates are inducted into the Order. The annual Pageant is presented on Friday night, which also kicks off the Summer Fellowship during which more members are inducted, and officers of the lodge are chosen for the coming year. Over the past seventy years, Santee Lodge 116 has become an active, viable part of the Pee Dee Area Council. Many former youth members of the lodge are still involved in Scouting as Volunteer Leaders. Several members have become professional Scouters and one cannot enter a city, town or community without finding someone that has been touched by the Lodge. Many members have gone on to become Section Officers and serve with distinction. Jody Clark became the first Santee Lodge member to become a national figure as he was elected Southeast Region Chief. Both he and Mac McLean have been honored with the Distinguished Service Award, the National Order of the Arrow's highest honor. Former Lodge Adviser David Surrett also holds the DSA from prior service as Section SE-5 Chief, NOAC and NLS Staff member and Region OA Committee member. Members account for about 85% of all Eagle Scouts from the Pee Dee Area Council. Many of the adult members have been awarded the Wood Badge, District Award of Merit and the Silver Beaver.

At the BSA's National Meeting in 1995, Santee Lodge was honored as recipient of the E. Urner Goodman Camping Award, one of only eight presented nationally. For the past several years, Santee Lodge has been honored as a National Quality Lodge. In 2005, Santee Lodge was one of only two lodges in the Southern Region chosen to receive the National Service Award, an award given on the basis of significant service to the home council.

== See also ==
- Scouting in South Carolina
