= McBee, South Carolina =

- Town
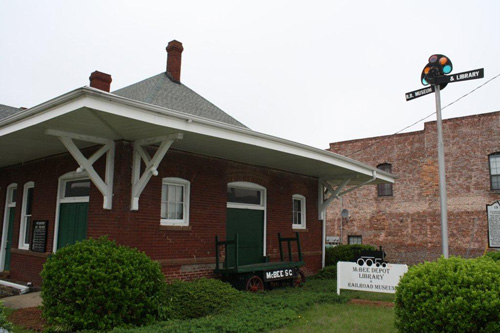
- McBee Railroad Depot, built in 1914

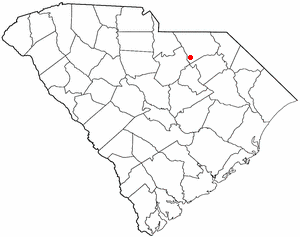
- Location of McBee, South Carolina
- Coordinates: 34°28′04″N 80°15′10″W
- Country: United States
- State: South Carolina
- County: Chesterfield
- Founded: October 8, 1901

Area
  - Total: 1.31 sq mi (3.40 km^{2})
  - Land: 1.31 sq mi (3.40 km^{2})
  - Water: 0 sq mi (0.00 km^{2})
- Elevation: 469 ft (143 m)

Population (2020)
  - Total: 758
  - Density: 578.1/sq mi (223.22/km^{2})
- Time zone: UTC-5 (Eastern (EST))
  - Summer (DST): UTC-4 (EDT)
- ZIP code: 29101
- Area codes: 843, 854
- FIPS code: 45-43495
- GNIS feature ID: 2406121
- Website: townofmcbeesc.com

McBee /ˈmækbi/ is a town in Chesterfield County, South Carolina, United States. As of the 2020 census, McBee had a population of 758. McBee is approximately 36 miles (58 km) northwest of Florence and 62 miles (100 km) northeast of Columbia.

== History ==
Building of the McBee to Wagram railroad in 1910

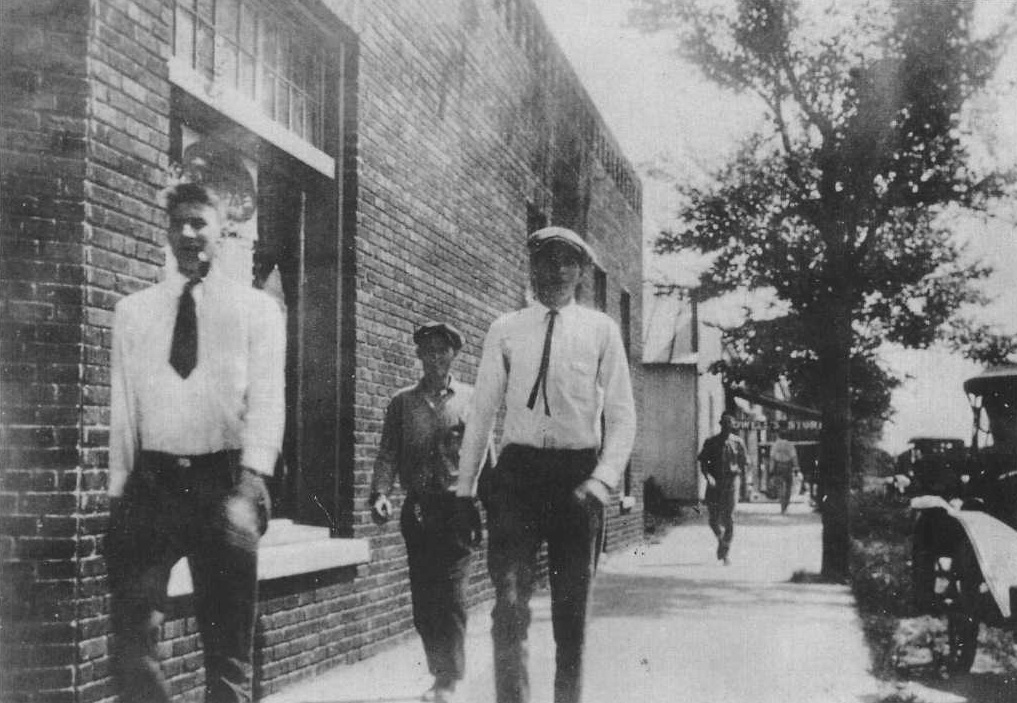
McBee 1920s Main Street

=== Origin ===
McBee was named after a railroad executive, V.E. "Bunch" McBee, born July 26, 1849, in Greenville County, South Carolina. Bunch McBee was one of South Carolina's leading forces in the building of railroads, was responsible for the Columbia to Hamlet, North Carolina, line, which runs through McBee, and was at one time superintendent of the Seaboard Air Line Railroad.

=== 20th century ===
In 1900, McBee's first railroad depot was built. About one year later on October 8, 1901, McBee was incorporated. On June 30, 1901, McBee Presbyterian Church was built, the first church in McBee. Six years later in 1907 McBee's second church, McBee Methodist Church, was built.

After the Seaboard's Columbia-to-Cheraw line was completed in 1900, McBee grew so quickly that a new depot became a high priority by the end of the decade. In 1914, the Seaboard Air Line Railroad built a second depot in McBee. This was both a passenger and freight depot until it closed in 1971. Now it is the McBee Depot Library and Railroad Museum. It was listed in the National Register of Historic Places in 1999 as the Seaboard Air Line Railway Depot in McBee. In 1980, the railroad became a subsidiary of the newly created CSX Corporation, and in 1986 the Seaboard name was changed to CSX Transportation.

In 1945, U.S. Route 1 through McBee was named the Blue Star Memorial Highway Number 6.

McBee Rescue was originally formed in 1962 as a joint venture with Jefferson Rescue to fill the need of rescue - ambulance service in the area. The ambulance was rotated between McBee and Jefferson and responded to the appropriate area as needed. The ambulance was originally parked on the street corner in McBee and later at the Health Center prior to constructing the current squad building. Prior to the ambulance, the only means of transport to the hospital was by personal vehicle or by the funeral home hearse, which had to come from Hartsville. Approximately one year later McBee and Jefferson split and formed their own respective squads and each purchased an ambulance.

In 1973, the town of McBee purchased a second engine for the McBee Fire Department. In 1986, Alligator Fire District was formed with McBee Fire Department.

=== 21st century ===
In 2001, McBee celebrated its 100-year anniversary. In 2001 McBee Elementary School was re-modeled. Following the completion of the elementary school, in 2005 McBee High School also was re-modeled. In 2012 McBee built a recreational complex that consists of four baseball diamonds, a football field, a soccer field, a walking trail, and a practice football field. In 2013 McBee launched their official website. Nestle Waters of North American, completed their bottled water facility in 2016, creating 27 jobs in McBee.

== Geography and climate ==
McBee is located in southwestern Chesterfield County in the Sandhills region of the Carolinas. U.S. Route 1 passes through the center of town, leading southwest 27 miles (43 km) to Camden and northeast 28 miles (45 km) to Cheraw. South Carolina Highway 151 crosses US 1 in the center of town, leading northwest 16 miles (26 km) to Jefferson and southeast 14 miles (23 km) to Hartsville. South Carolina Highway 145 splits off from US 1 just north of McBee and leads 25 miles (40 km) northeast to Chesterfield, the county seat.

According to the United States Census Bureau, McBee has a total area of 1.3 square miles (3.3 km^{2}), all land.

McBee has a humid subtropical climate, characterized by humid summers and cool dry winters. Precipitation does not vary greatly between seasons. July is the hottest month, with an average high temperature of below 91 °F and an average low temperature of around 69 °F.[6] The coldest month of the year is January, when the average high temperature is near 54 °F and the average low temperature is below 32 °F.[6] The warmest temperature ever recorded in the town was 106 °F.[7] The coldest temperature ever recorded in the town was -2 °F.[8] While McBee is near a coastal area, hurricanes are not a major concern, but are possible in this part of South Carolina.

Climate data for McBee, South Carolina
Month	Jan	Feb	Mar	Apr	May	Jun	Jul	Aug	Sep	Oct	Nov	Dec	Year
Mean daily maximum °F (°C)	48 (9)	54 (12)	65 (18)	74 (23)	80 (27)	88 (31)	90 (32)	89 (32)	83 (28)	73 (23)	58 (14)	48 (9)	71 (22)
Mean daily minimum °F (°C)	28 (−2)	32 (0)	42 (6)	48 (9)	58 (14)	68 (20)	70 (21)	70 (21)	64 (18)	52 (11)	38 (3)	30 (−1)	50 (10)
Average precipitation inches (mm)	4.64 (118)	3.97 (101)	5.04 (128)	3.33 (85)	3.42 (87)	4.33 (110)	4.12 (105)	3.88 (99)	4.68 (119)	3.80 (97)	3.59 (91)	3.52 (89)	48.32 (1,229)
Average snowfall inches (cm)	2.1 (5.3)	1.9 (4.8)	1.6 (4.1)	0 (0)	0 (0)	0 (0)	0 (0)	0 (0)	0 (0)	0.1 (0.25)	0.3 (0.76)	0.9 (2.3)	6.9 (18)
Average precipitation days	11.2	9.3	10.8	8.6	10.1	10.3	11.0	9.6	7.9	6.5	8.6	10.0	113.9
Average snowy days (≥ 0.3 in)	1.8	0.8	0.8	0	0	0	0	0	0	0.2	0.5	0.8	4.9
Mean monthly sunshine hours	173.6	180.8	235.5	270.0	291.4	288.0	291.5	272.8	240.0	229.4	177.0	167.4	2,817.4
Source: http://www.weather.com/outlook/health/fitness/wxclimatology/monthly/graph/29101

== Demographics ==
Historical population
Census	Pop.	Note	%±
1910	187		—
1920	417		123.0%
1930	514		23.3%
1940	587		14.2%
1950	420		−28.4%
1960	512		21.9%
1970	540		5.5%
1980	623		15.4%
1990	715		14.8%
2000	714		−0.1%
2010	867		21.4%
2020	758		−12.6%
U.S. Decennial Census

=== 2020 census ===
McBee racial composition
Race	Num.	Perc.
White (non-Hispanic)	434	57.26%
Black or African American (non-Hispanic)	254	33.51%
Native American	1	0.13%
Asian	1	0.13%
Other/Mixed	31	4.09%
Hispanic or Latino	37	4.88%

As of the 2020 United States census, there were 758 people, 365 households, and 275 families residing in the town.

=== 2010 census ===
As of the census of 2010, there were 867 people, 282 households, and 195 families residing in the town. The population density was 613.3 inhabitants per square mile (236.8/km^{2}). There were 329 housing units at an average density of 282.6 per square mile (109.1/km^{2}). The racial makeup of the town was 53.36% White, 45.52% African American, 0.56% Native American, and 0.56% from two or more races. Hispanic or Latino of any race were 0.70% of the population.

There were 282 households, out of which 29.8% had children under the age of 18 living with them, 44.3% were married couples living together, 18.8% had a female householder with no husband present, and 30.5% were non-families. 27.3% of all households were made up of individuals, and 8.9% had someone living alone who was 65 years of age or older. The average household size was 2.53 and the average family size was 3.09.

In the town, the population was spread out, with 26.1% under the age of 18, 8.7% from 18 to 24, 26.1% from 25 to 44, 26.9% from 45 to 64, and 12.3% who were 65 years of age or older. The median age was 38 years. For every 100 females, there were 83.5 males. For every 100 females age 18 and over, there were 79.6 males.

The median income for a household in the town was $27,083, and the median income for a family was $34,688. Males had a median income of $28,667 versus $21,500 for females. About 3.1% of families and 5.4% of the population were below the poverty line, including 33.2% of those under age 18 and 28.7% of those age 65 or over.

== Education ==
McBee's public schools are under the jurisdiction of the Chesterfield County School District. The district operates McBee Elementary School and McBee High School.

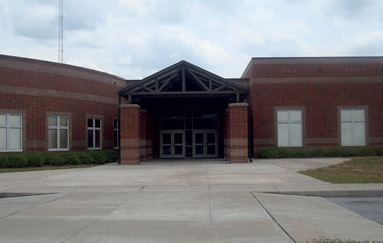
McBee High School, 2011

McBee Elementary School is a public secondary school serving grades K through 6 in McBee. The school is located on McBee's West side, near Highway 1. McBee Elementary has an approximate enrollment of 401 and has 15.4 Student to Teacher Ratio, and is one of six elementary schools under the jurisdiction of Chesterfield County Public School District.

McBee High School is a public secondary school serving grades 7 through 12 in McBee. The school is located on McBee's west side, near the intersection of Highways 151 and 1. McBee High has an approximate enrollment of 600 students and is one of four high schools under the jurisdiction of Chesterfield County Public School District.

McBee has a public library, a branch of the Chesterfield County Library System.

== Transportation ==
=== Highway ===
- South Carolina Highway 151 is a state highway that runs northwest to southeast through the town. McBee is approximately the halfway point between Charlotte and Myrtle Beach.
- U.S. Route 1 runs southwest to northeast through the town. The road runs from Fort Kent, Maine, to Key West, Florida. In 1945, the straight of U.S. Route 1 going through McBee was named a Blue Star Memorial Highway Number 6.

=== Railroads ===
- On January 1, 1900, McBee was reached by the railroad! In September 1899 construction had begun on the Chesterfield and Kershaw Railroad starting in Cheraw. Construction was completed to Camden by May 10, 1900, by the Raleigh and Gaston RR, 55 miles. Both railroad companies were merged into the new Seaboard Air Line Railway November 1, 1901. (Cariker, S. David, 1985, "Railroading in the Carolina Sandhills: Volume 1", page 119.)
- In July 1902 McBee became the starting point of construction of the Columbia, Monroe, and Charlotte Railroad, just south of Poplar Avenue. It was completed in 1903 from McBee to Junction, Diggs, Lee, Clark [Angelus], Miller and Jefferson, 17.16 miles. It came under Seaboard Air Line control April 6, 1914, but never with a profitably year. It operated 38 years until February 3, 1940, and was formally abandoned October 24, 1940, and dismantled in 1945. (Cariker, S. David, 1987, "Railroading in the Carolina Sandhills: Volume 2", page 32-33, 124.)
- On March 30, 1910, McBee became the starting point of construction of the South Carolina Western Railway, just north of Poplar Avenue. It was completed and opened January 1, 1911, to Hartsville. The company was absorbed into the Seaboard Air Line April 6, 1914. The line has been in service until recently and is slated to be dismantled in 2024. (Cariker, S. David, 1987, "Railroading in the Carolina Sandhills: Volume 2, page 84")

== Arts and culture ==
- The Taste of McBee - mid-March
- Sandhills Classic Band Invitational - late September
- McLeod Farms Strawberry Festival - early May
- McLeod Farms Peach Festival - early July
- McLeod Farms Fall Festival - late October
- McBee Homecoming Parade - late October
- McBee Christmas Parade - early December

== Notable people ==
- Don King, NFL defensive tackle
- Noah O. Knight, Medal of Honor recipient

== See also ==
- Carolina Sandhills National Wildlife Refuge
- National Register of Historic Places listings in Chesterfield County, South Carolina
