= Pee Dee, Montgomery County, North Carolina =

Unincorporated community in North Carolina, US

Coordinates: 34.9351537°N 79.8895028°W

Pee Dee is an unincorporated community in southwestern Montgomery County, North Carolina, United States, located on North Carolina Highway 73. U.S. Representative and State Senator Edmund Deberry lived in Pee Dee, which was a township at that time, until his death in 1859.

The community was named for the Pee Dee people, who built the nearby Town Creek Indian Mound.
