= Morven, North Carolina =

- Town
- Seal

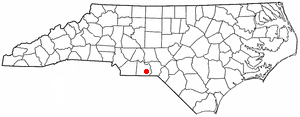
- Location of Morven, North Carolina
- Coordinates: 34°51′52″N 80°00′00″W
- Country: United States
- State: North Carolina
- County: Anson
- Founded: 1823
- Incorporated: 1883
- Named for: Morven, Scotland

Area
  - Total: 1.03 sq mi (2.66 km^{2})
  - Land: 1.03 sq mi (2.66 km^{2})
  - Water: 0 sq mi (0.00 km^{2})
- Elevation: 345 ft (105 m)

Population (2020)
  - Total: 329
  - Density: 320.3/sq mi (123.68/km^{2})
- Time zone: UTC-5 (Eastern (EST))
  - Summer (DST): UTC-4 (EDT)
- ZIP code: 28119
- Area code: 704
- FIPS code: 37-44560
- GNIS feature ID: 2406199
- Website: www.townofmorven.org

Morven is a town in Anson County, North Carolina, United States. The population was 329 at the 2020 census. The town was named after a town in Argyllshire, Scotland.

== Geography ==
According to the United States Census Bureau, the town has a total area of 1.0 square mile (2.7 km^{2}), all land.

Morven is located on US Highway 52.

== Demographics ==
Historical population
Census	Pop.	Note	%±
1900	447		—
1910	498		11.4%
1920	631		26.7%
1930	590		−6.5%
1940	602		2.0%
1950	601		−0.2%
1960	518		−13.8%
1970	562		8.5%
1980	765		36.1%
1990	590		−22.9%
2000	579		−1.9%
2010	511		−11.7%
2020	329		−35.6%
2021 (est.)	334	▲	1.5%
U.S. Decennial Census

=== 2020 census ===
Morven town, North Carolina – Racial and ethnic composition Note: the US Census treats Hispanic/Latino as an ethnic category. This table excludes Latinos from the racial categories and assigns them to a separate category. Hispanics/Latinos may be of any race.
Race / Ethnicity (NH = Non-Hispanic)	Pop 2000	Pop 2010	Pop 2020	% 2000	% 2010	% 2020
White alone (NH)	130	101	58	22.45%	19.77%	17.63%
Black or African American alone (NH)	443	381	253	76.51%	74.56%	76.90%
Native American or Alaska Native alone (NH)	2	2	0	0.35%	0.39%	0.00%
Asian alone (NH)	0	0	1	0.00%	0.00%	0.30%
Native Hawaiian or Pacific Islander alone (NH)	0	0	0	0.00%	0.00%	0.00%
Other race alone (NH)	2	0	1	0.35%	0.00%	0.30%
Mixed race or Multiracial (NH)	0	12	9	0.00%	2.35%	2.74%
Hispanic or Latino (any race)	2	15	7	0.35%	2.94%	2.13%
Total	579	511	329	100.00%	100.00%	100.00%

=== 2000 census ===
As of the census of 2000, there were 579 people, 207 households, and 148 families residing in the town. The population density was 534.1 inhabitants per square mile (206.2/km^{2}). There were 249 housing units at an average density of 229.7 per square mile (88.7/km^{2}). The racial makeup of the town was 76.86% African American,22.45% White, 0.35% Native American, 0.35% from other races. Hispanic or Latino of any race were 0.35% of the population.

There were 207 households, out of which 37.7% had children under the age of 18 living with them, 35.7% were married couples living together, 30.4% had a female householder with no husband present, and 28.5% were non-families. 25.1% of all households were made up of individuals, and 13.0% had someone living alone who was 65 years of age or older. The average household size was 2.80 and the average family size was 3.37.

In the town, the population was spread out, with 34.0% under the age of 18, 9.2% from 18 to 24, 26.1% from 25 to 44, 18.0% from 45 to 64, and 12.8% who were 65 years of age or older. The median age was 30 years. For every 100 females, there were 72.8 males. For every 100 females age 18 and over, there were 69.0 males.

The median income for a household in the town was $23,333, and the median income for a family was $30,000. Males had a median income of $27,000 versus $17,344 for females. The per capita income for the town was $9,923. About 24.2% of families and 24.9% of the population were below the poverty line, including 33.3% of those under age 18 and 17.1% of those age 65 or over.

== Notable people ==
- Juanita Moody (1924–2015) – American cryptographer and intelligence analyst
- Haywood Rivers (1922–2001) – African-American artist and gallery owner
- Belvin Maynard (1892-1922) - Aviator
