= Pee Dee =

Region of the U.S. state of South Carolina

Coordinates: 34.205833°N 79.539167°W

The twelve counties that comprise the Pee Dee region

The Pee Dee is a region in the northeast corner of the U.S. state of South Carolina. It lies along the lower watershed of the Pee Dee River, which was named after the Pee Dee, an Indigenous tribe historically inhabiting the region.

== History ==
The region was the homeland of the Pedee Native Americans, a people who originally occupied the area as part of the South Appalachian Mississippian culture from about 1000 to 1400, leaving the region for unknown reasons. Today, several nonprofit organizations have been recognized by South Carolina as descendants of the historic Pee Dee, including two state-recognized tribes and one state-recognized group. However, none of these organizations are federally recognized.

== Economy ==
The region's largest county is Horry. It encompasses the Grand Strand, which includes the beaches running from the North Carolina state border to the Winyah Bay in Georgetown County in South Carolina. On the coast, the economy is dominated by tourism, and features beaches, amusement parks, shopping, fishing, and golf. The area has become a major retirement center in the United States, in part because of its low cost of living, mild weather, and numerous golf courses. Inland is a belt featuring rivers, marshes, Carolina bays, and sandy rises where forestry is predominant. There are pine plantations and bald cypress timbering. Further inland, on higher ground, but still of only slight relief, is an agricultural belt of cultivation of tobacco, cotton, soybeans and produce.

The region, especially the inland portion, remained mostly rural well into the 20th century. As late as the 1970s, it was still so rural that Florence's second television station, WPDE-TV, obtained a Farmers Home Administration loan to build a studio and tower.

== Regional definition ==
There is no agreed definition on which of South Carolina's counties are included in the region. The region takes its name from the Pee Dee River. The counties in the Pee Dee region are located, either entirely or partially, within the river's watershed.

Historical population
Census	Pop.	Note	%±
1950	510,179		—
1960	532,450		4.4%
1970	524,091		−1.6%
1980	624,669		19.2%
1990	683,840		9.5%
2000	777,839		13.7%
2010	871,876		12.1%
2020	926,069		6.2%
2022 (est.)	953,988		3.0%
U.S. Decennial Census

=== Always included ===
- Chesterfield
- Darlington
- Dillon
- Florence
- Marlboro
- Marion

=== Usually included ===
- Horry
- Georgetown
- Williamsburg

=== Rarely included ===
- Clarendon
- Lee
- Sumter

== Politics ==
The Pee Dee region has remained relatively constant during the first decade of the 21st century in terms of its voting history. The region's voters have been close during the previous four presidential elections, but lean toward the Republican Party. The tilt of the region is primarily due to the numerous Republicans resident in Horry County along the Atlantic coast.

At the congressional level, the region, including the rarely included counties, is located within three congressional districts. The Pee Dee region is mostly contained in South Carolina's 7th congressional district.

Williamsburg, Clarendon, parts of Sumter, and parts of Florence counties are located in the majority-minority 6th district. Lee and the remaining parts of Sumter counties are located in 5th district. The 5th and 6th districts are represented by Republican Ralph Norman and Democrat Jim Clyburn, respectively.

The 7th district was established following the 2010 census. In the 2012 elections, incumbents Mulvaney and Clyburn won re-election. Republican Tom Rice defeated Democrat Gloria Tinubu, both of Horry County, 54.9% to 45.1%, to represent South Carolina's new House seat.

Presidential Election Results 2000-2012
Year	Democrat	Republican
2012	47% 139,723	53% 159,629
2008	47% 138,565	53% 153,380
2004	46% 106,776	54% 124,487
2000	47% 96,150	53% 107,954

== Cities ==
=== Primary cities ===
(population figures is from 2020 census estimates)

- Florence: 39,899
- Myrtle Beach: 35,682

=== Cities with a population of at least 5,000 ===
- Bennettsville: 7,020
- Cheraw: 5,040
- Conway: 24,849
- Darlington: 6,149
- Dillon: 6,384
- Georgetown: 8,403
- Hartsville: 7,446
- Lake City: 5,903
- Marion: 6.448
- North Myrtle Beach: 18,790

== Higher education ==
=== 4-year colleges ===
- Coastal Carolina University- Conway
- Coker University- Hartsville
- Francis Marion University- Florence

=== 2-year or specialized colleges ===
- Florence-Darlington Technical College-Florence
- Horry-Georgetown Technical College- Conway
- Northeastern Technical College- Cheraw
- Williamsburg Technical College- Kingstree

== Media ==
The area is served by four commercial broadcast television stations, WBTW CBS 13, WPDE ABC 15, WMBF NBC 32 and WFXB Fox 43, the first two with twin studios at Florence and Myrtle Beach, as well as two educational television stations substations, WHMC-TV, in Conway, South Carolina, and WJPM-TV in Florence, South Carolina

Daily newspapers include The Sun News of Myrtle Beach and The Morning News of Florence. The Georgetown Times is published five times per week.

== Major highways ==
- I-20
- I-95
- Future I-73
- US 1
- US 15
- US 17
- US 52
- US 76
- US 301
- US 378
- US 401
- US 501
- US 521
- US 701
- SC 22
- SC 31
- SC 9
- SC 38
- SC 41 & SC Highway 41 ALT
- SC 51
- SC 145
- SC 151
- SC 177
- SC 261

== See also ==
- Early history of Williamsburg, South Carolina
- Pee Dee Area Council
- Peedee Formation
- The Cheraws
- Waxhaws
