= Special routes of U.S. Route 15 =

Special routes of U.S. Route 15

Highway system
- United States Numbered Highway System; List; Special; Divided

Several special routes of U.S. Route 15 (US 15) exist. In order from south to north, they are as follows.

== South Carolina ==
=== Walterboro–Creedmoor alternate route ===
U.S. Highway 15 Alternate
- Location: Walterboro, South Carolina–North Carolina state line
- Existed: 1936–1957

U.S. Highway 15A
- Location: South Carolina state line–Creedmoor, North Carolina
- Existed: 1936–1957

U.S. Highway 15 Alternate (US 15 Alt.) in South Carolina and U.S. Highway 15A (US 15A) in North Carolina was established in 1936 as a renumbering of US 401, from Walterboro, South Carolina, to Creedmoor, North Carolina, going through the cities of Laurinburg, Raeford, Fayetteville, Lillington, and Raleigh. In 1950, South Carolina discontinued the US 15A concurrency with US 15, but it was not until 1953 when North Carolina followed and moved US 15A's southern terminus in Laurinburg. In 1957, US 15A was renumbered back to US 401.

=== Santee connector route ===
U.S. Highway 15 Connector
- Location: Santee, South Carolina
- Length: 2.140 mi (3.444 km)

U.S. Highway 15 Connector (US 15 Conn.) is a 2.140-mile (3.444 km) connector route that connects US 15/US 301 at the SCHP Patrolman Harry B. Ray Memorial Intersection just southwest of Santee, South Carolina, with South Carolina Highway 6 (SC 6) in the northeastern part of the town.

=== Summerton connector route ===
U.S. Highway 15 Connector
- Railroad Avenue
- Location: Summerton, South Carolina
- Length: 0.090 mi (145 m)

U.S. Highway 15 Connector (US 15 Conn.) is a 0.090-mile (0.145 km) connector route that connects US 301 with US 15 within the city limits of Summerton, South Carolina. It is known as Railroad Avenue and is an unsigned highway.

=== Sumter connector route ===
U.S. Highway 15 Connector
- Location: Sumter, South Carolina
- Length: 0.340 mi (547 m)

U.S. Highway 15 Connector (US 15 Conn.) is a 0.340-mile (0.547 km) connector route that connects US 15 with US 521 within the city limits of Sumter, South Carolina. Each of its terminuses is on the Sumter–South Sumter line. It is unnamed and is an unsigned highway.

=== Sumter–Society Hill alternate route ===
U.S. Highway 15 Alternate
- Location: Sumter–Society Hill, South Carolina
- Existed: 1955–1957

U.S. Highway 15 Alternate (US 15 Alt.) was an alternate route of US 15 that ran from Sumter to Society Hill, South Carolina. In 1957, it was decommissioned and replaced by US 401.

=== Dubose–Manville alternate route ===
U.S. Highway 15 Alternate
- Location: Dubose–Manville, South Carolina

=== Hartsville alternate route ===
U.S. Highway 15 Alternate
- Location: Hartsville, South Carolina

=== Hartsville business loop ===
U.S. Highway 15 Business
- Location: Hartsville, South Carolina
- Length: 6.500 mi (10.461 km)

U.S. Highway 15 Business (US 15 Bus.) is a 6.500-mile (10.461 km) business route of US 15 in Hartsville, South Carolina. It starts at US 15 outside of Hartsville. It then intersects SC 151 Bus. in the center of Hartsville and SC 102 in North Hartsville. It then ends at US 15.

Major intersections

The entire route is in Darlington County.

| Location | mi | km | Destinations | Notes |
|---|---|---|---|---|
| | 0.000 | 0.000 | US 15 (Marquis Highway) – Bishopville | Southern terminus |
| Hartsville | 2.060 | 3.315 | SC 151 Bus. – Darlington, Florence, McBee, Charlotte, Coker College | |
| North Hartsville | 4.330 | 6.968 | SC 102 north – Patrick, Chesterfield | Southern terminus of SC 102 |
| | 6.500 | 10.461 | US 15 (Marquis Highway/5th Street) – Bennettsville, Cheraw, Bishopville, Darlington | Southern terminus |
1.000 mi = 1.609 km; 1.000 km = 0.621 mi

=== Hartsville truck route ===
U.S. Highway 15 Truck
- Location: Hartsville, South Carolina

=== Bennettsville business loop ===
U.S. Highway 15 Business
- Location: Bennettsville, South Carolina
- Existed: 1952–1990

U.S. Highway 15 Business (US 15 Bus.) was a business loop of US 15 that ran through Bennettsville, South Carolina. In 1990, it was decommissioned and replaced by SC 385.

== North Carolina ==
=== Laurinburg business loop ===
U.S. Highway 15 Business
- Location: Laurinburg, North Carolina
- Length: 3.6 mi (5.8 km)
- Existed: 1962–present

U.S. Highway 15 Business (US 15 Bus.) was established between 1960 and 1962 following the original mainline US 15 route through Laurinburg, North Carolina. US 15 Bus., in concurrency partly with US 401 Bus. and US 501 Bus., traversed along Main Street and Aberdeen Road.

Major intersections

The entire route is in Laurinburg, Scotland County.

| mi | km | Destinations | Notes |
|---|---|---|---|
| 0.0 | 0.0 | US 15 / US 401 (McColl Road) – McColl | South end of US 401 Business overlap |
| 0.5 | 0.80 | I-74 / US 74 – Hamlet, Rockingham, Lumberton | |
| 1.3 | 2.1 | US 501 Bus. south – Raemon, Rowland | South end of US 501 Business overlap |
| 2.0 | 3.2 | US 74 Bus. (Church Street) – Hamlet, Maxton | |
| 2.9 | 4.7 | US 401 Bus. north (Main Street) | North end of US 401 Business overlap |
| 3.6 | 5.8 | US 15 / US 401 / US 501 – Aberdeen, Wagram, Raeford | North end of US 501 Business overlap |
1.000 mi = 1.609 km; 1.000 km = 0.621 mi: Concurrency terminus

=== Sanford alternate route ===
U.S. Highway 15A
- Location: Sanford, North Carolina
- Length: 6.5 mi (10.5 km)
- Existed: 1957–1960

U.S. Highway 15A (US 15A) was established in 1957 when mainline US 15 was bypassed west of Sanford, North Carolina. US 15A, in concurrency with US 1A and US 501A, traversed on Carthage Street and Hawkins Avenue. In 1960, it was renumbered as US 15 Bus.

=== Sanford business loop ===
U.S. Highway 15 Business
- Location: Sanford, North Carolina
- Length: 6.5 mi (10.5 km)
- Existed: 1960–1978

U.S. Highway 15 Business (US 15 Bus.) in Sanford, North Carolina, was established in 1960 as a renumbering of US 15A along Carthage Street and Hawkins Avenue, in concurrency with US 1 Bus. and US 501 Bus. Between 1976 and 1978, US 1 Bus. was rerouted along North Carolina Highway 42 on Wicker Street; it is believed that both US 15 Bus. and US 501 Bus. were decommissioned by that time.

=== Sanford bypass route ===
U.S. Highway 15 Bypass
- Location: Sanford, North Carolina

=== Chapel Hill alternate route ===
U.S. Highway 15A
- Location: Chapel Hill, North Carolina
- Length: 4.3 mi (6.9 km)
- Existed: 1953–1960

U.S. Highway 15A (US 15A) was established in 1953 when mainline US 15 was bypassed around Chapel Hill, North Carolina. US 15A, in concurrency with US 501A, traversed on Columbia and Franklin streets. In 1960, it was renumbered as US 15 Bus.

=== Chapel Hill business loop ===
U.S. Highway 15 Business
- Location: Chapel Hill, North Carolina
- Length: 4.3 mi (6.9 km)
- Existed: 1960–1987

U.S. Highway 15 Business (US 15 Bus.) in Chapel Hill, North Carolina, was established in 1960 as a renumbering of US 15A along Columbia and Franklin streets, in concurrency with US 501 Bus. It was decommissioned between 1985 and 1987.

=== Durham business loop ===
U.S. Highway 15 Business
- Location: Durham, North Carolina
- Length: 6.4 mi (10.3 km)
- Existed: 1960–present

U.S. Highway 15 Business (US 15 Bus.) was established in 1960 as a renumbering of mainline US 15, along University Drive and Roxboro Street, through downtown Durham, North Carolina. It is in concurrency with US 501 Bus. for majority of its route and is relatively unchanged since inception.

Major intersections

The entire route is in Durham, Durham County.

| mi | km | Destinations | Notes |
|---|---|---|---|
| 0.0 | 0.0 | US 15 / US 501 – Chapel Hill, Durham Downtown | South end of US 501 Business overlap |
| 1.6 | 2.6 | NC 751 (Academy Road) | To Duke University |
| 4.5 | 7.2 | NC 147 (Durham Freeway) – RTP | |
| 5.0 | 8.0 | US 70 Bus. / NC 98 (Ramseur Street/Holloway Street) | Brief overlap of eastbound US 70 Business and NC 98 |
| 6.4 | 10.3 | I-85 / US 15 / US 70 / US 501 Bus. – Roxboro, Greensboro, Oxford, Raleigh | North end of US 501 Business overlap |
1.000 mi = 1.609 km; 1.000 km = 0.621 mi: Concurrency terminus

=== Durham bypass route ===
U.S. Highway 15 Bypass
- Location: Durham, North Carolina

=== Oxford truck route ===
U.S. Highway 15 Truck
- Location: Oxford, North Carolina

== Virginia ==
=== Clarksville business route ===
U.S. Route 15 Business
- Location: Clarksville, Virginia

=== Keysville business loop ===
U.S. Route 15 Business
- Location: Keysville, Virginia

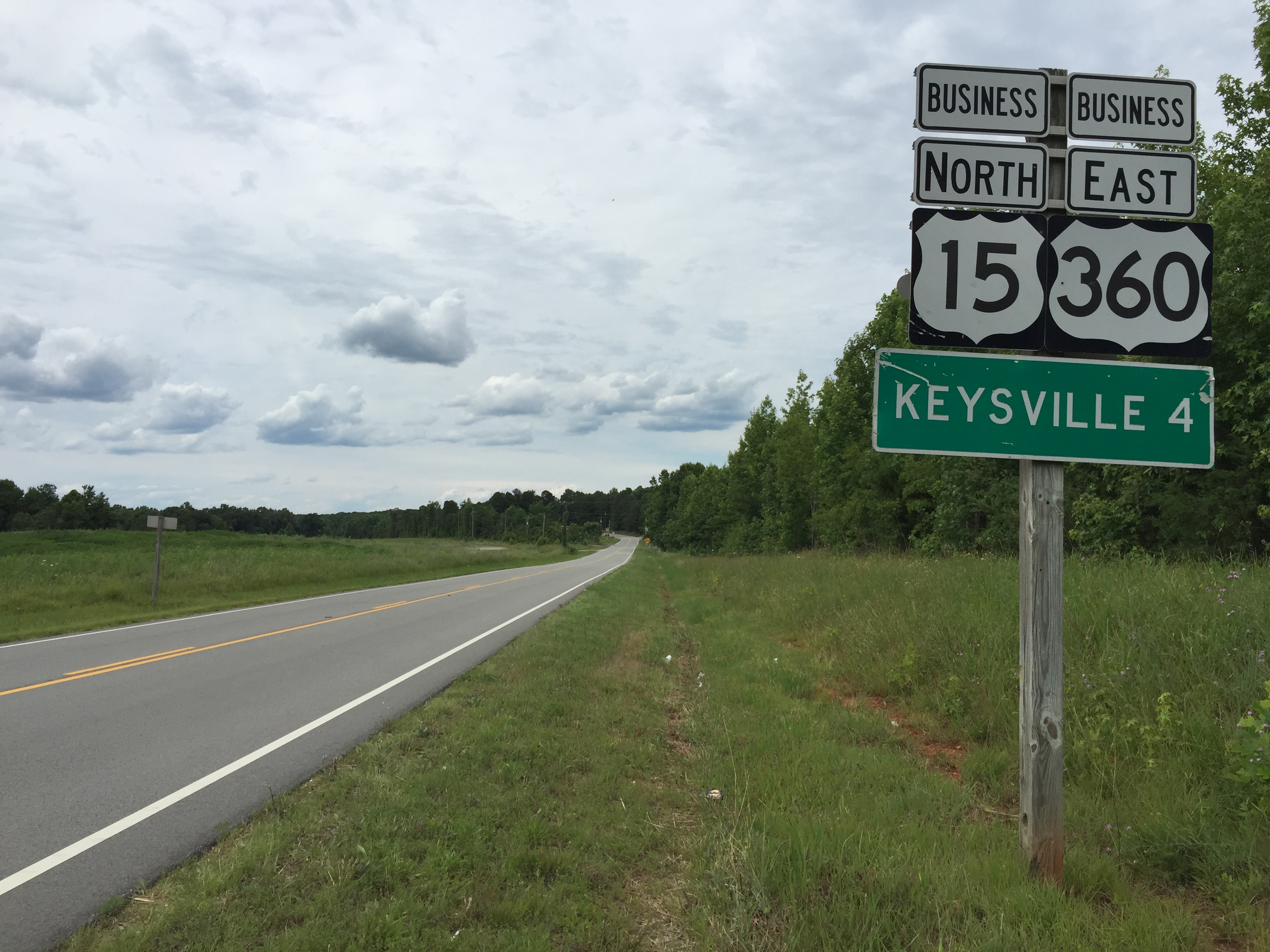
View north along US 15 Bus. and east along US 360 Bus. northeast of SR 622 just south of Keysville

U.S. Route 15 Business (US 15 Bus.) is a business route of US 15 in Charlotte County, Virginia. The highway, which runs 5.93 miles (9.54 km) between junctions with US 360 and US 15 south and north of Keysville, is entirely concurrent with US 360 Bus. US 15 Bus./US 360 Bus. follow Old Kings Highway from its southern end through a partial interchange with US 15 and US 360 to the town of Keysville. The business routes enter the town on King Street, along which the highways are concurrent with State Route 40 (SR 40). In the center of Keysville, US 15 Bus., US 360 Bus., and SR 40 curve north then west to cross the Southern Virginia Railroad. Just west of the railroad, the business routes turn north onto Front Street. US 15 Bus./US 360 Bus. follows Four Locust Highway to rejoin their respective mainline highways at a partial cloverleaf interchange.

=== Farmville business loop ===
U.S. Route 15 Business
- Location: Farmville, Virginia

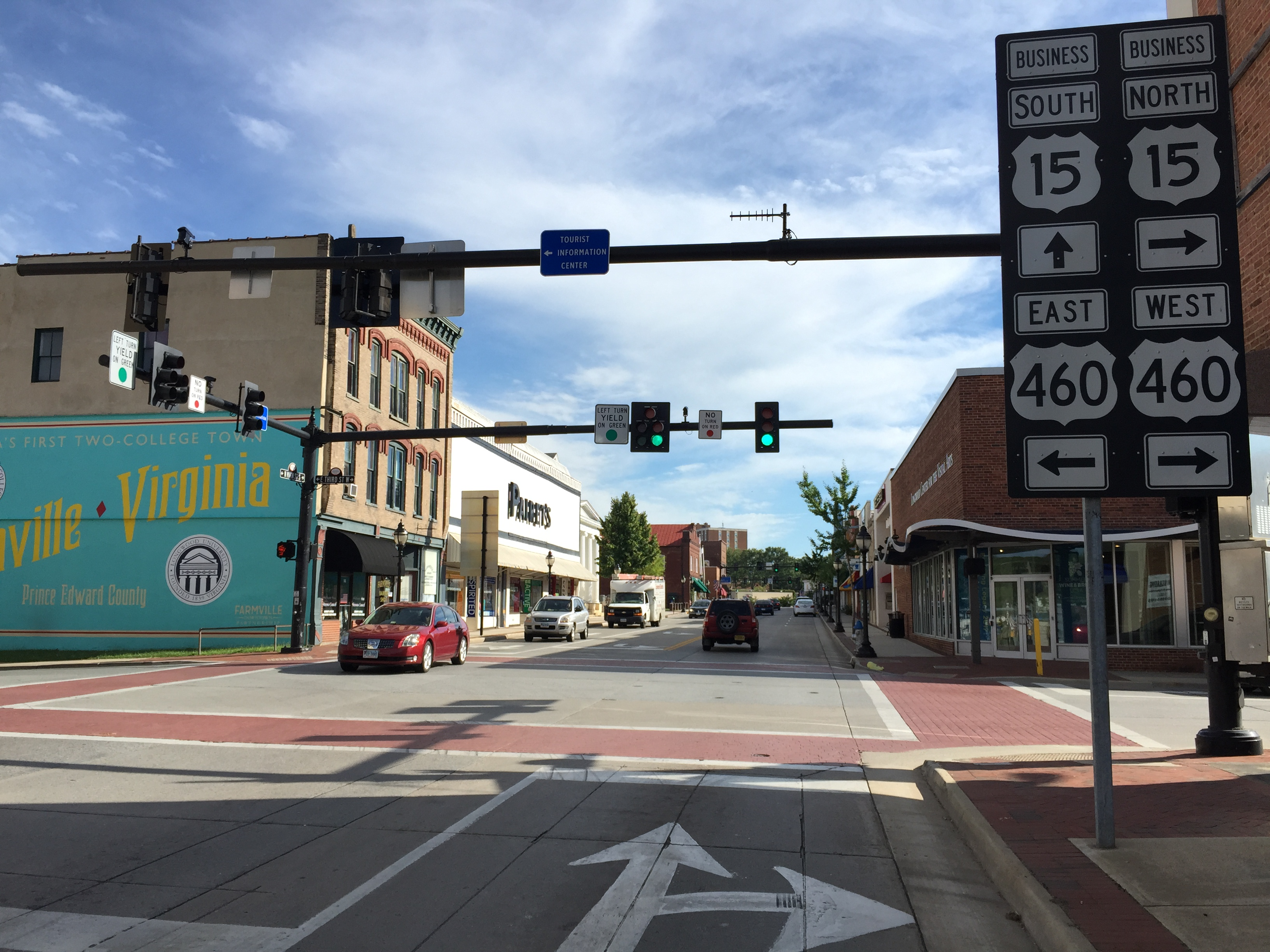
View south along US 15 Bus. at US 460 Bus. and the south end of SR 45 in Farmville

U.S. Route 15 Business (US 15 Bus.) in Farmville, Virginia, is a former segment of US 15 that begins at the southern end of an overlap at a diamond interchange with US 460. The route follows South Main Street directly into Farmville until the intersection with US 460 Bus. and SR 45 and turns west in its own concurrency with US 460 Bus. The US 15/US 460 concurrency ends when US 15 Bus. terminates just north of a trumpet interchange at the north end of the mainline US 15/US 460 overlap, but US 460 turns south an ends directly at that trumpet interchange with US 460.

=== Farmville alternate loop ===
U.S. Route 15 Alternate
- Location: Farmville, Virginia

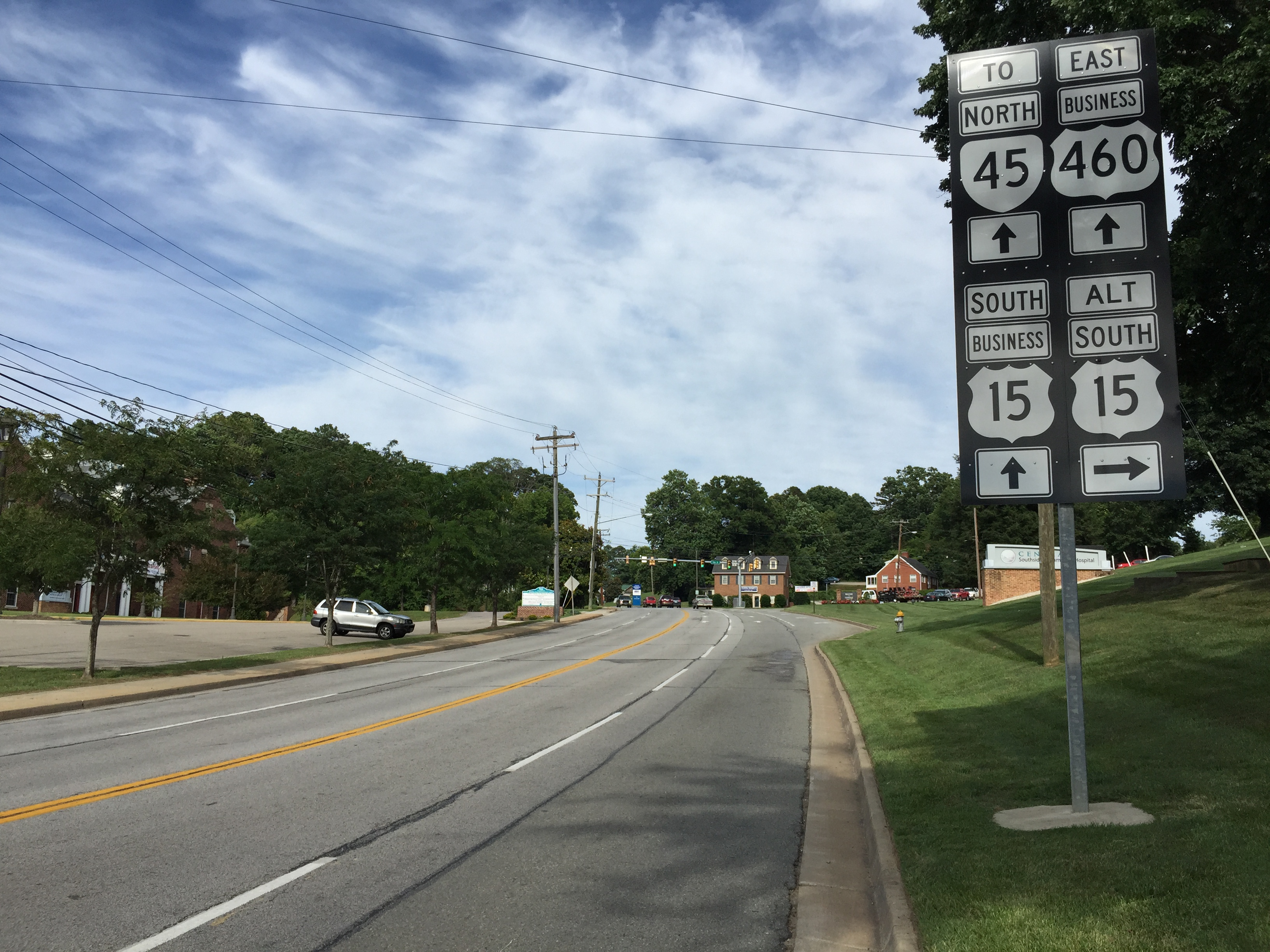
Sign for US 15 Alt. along US 15 Bus. and US 460 Bus. in Farmville

U.S. Route 15 Alternate (US 15 Alt.) in Farmville, Virginia, is an alternate route of US 15 Bus. The route diverges from US 15 Bus. at Griffin Boulevard south of downtown Farmville. It follows Griffin Boulevard north to High Street, then turns northwest along Oak Street. It rejoins US 15 Bus. and US 460 Bus. just west of downtown Farmville.

=== Culpeper business loop ===
U.S. Route 15 Business
- Location: Culpeper, Virginia
- Tourist routes: Journey Through Hallowed Ground Byway; Virginia Byway

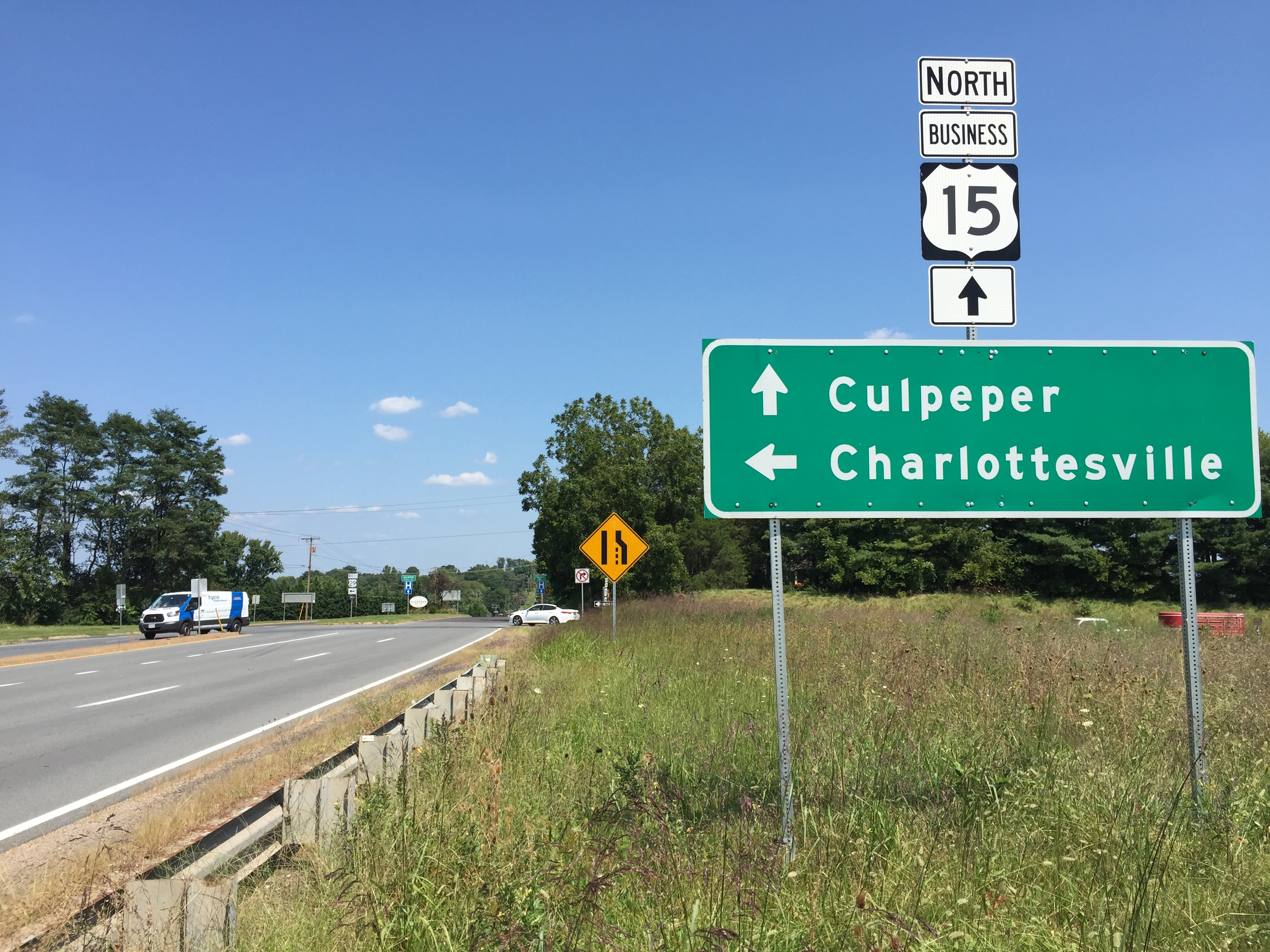
View north at the south end of US 15 Bus. at US 15/US 29 near Culpeper

U.S. Route 15 Business (US 15 Bus.) in Culpeper, Virginia, is a former segment of US 15 that begins at the southern end of an overlap at a diamond interchange, that being with US 29, where the mainline road turns east. The first leg of US 15 Bus. is Orange Road, and, despite the fact that Orange Road continues past US 522 to terminate as US 29 Bus., US 15 Bus. joins US 522 northwest in an overlap that meets US 29 Bus., where Madison Road becomes South Main Street. Along US 15 Bus./US 29 Bus./US 522, Orange Road terminates between West Park Avenue and West and East Mason streets. The intersection of Culpeper Street is where one can find Culpeper station if they turn east and drive two blocks away. US 522 turns left on West Evans Street, while, four blocks later, US 15 Bus./US 29 Bus. turns east off of North Main Street onto Old James Madison Highway, which eventually becomes Brandy Road and runs parallel to the same Amtrak line that used Culpeper station before terminating at an interchange with the US 15/US 29 overlap. Brandy Road becomes SR 762.

=== Remington business loop ===
U.S. Route 15 Business
- Location: Remington, Virginia
- Length: 2.71 mi (4.36 km)
- Existed: 1975–present
- Tourist routes: Journey Through Hallowed Ground Byway; Virginia Byway

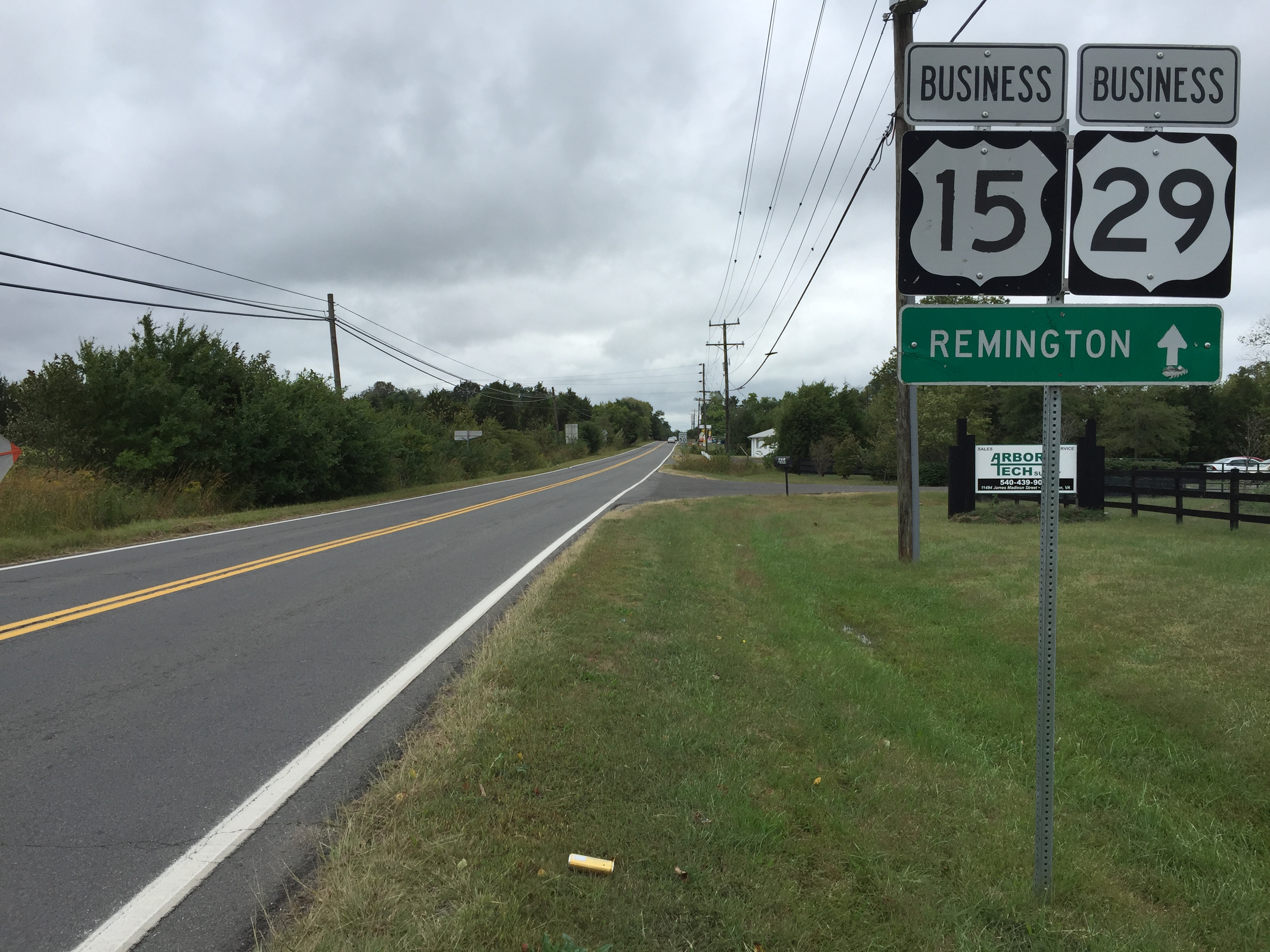
View south along US 15 Bus. and US 29 Bus. south of US 15/US 29 just north of Remington

U.S. Route 15 Business (US 15 Bus.), completely concurrent with US 29 Bus., is the former two-lane route of US 15/US 29 (James Madison Highway) through the town of Remington, Virginia, bypassed in 1975. It begins in Culpeper County where the bypass curves to the north, while US 15 Bus./US 29 Bus. heads northeast on Remington Road to a 1930 pony truss bridge over the Rappahannock River. Crossing the bridge into Fauquier County, it soon enters Remington, where it is known as James Madison Street. The principal intersection in Remington is with Main Street (SR 651), which heads west to the bypass and east to Sumerduck. After leaving Remington, US 15 Bus./US 29 Bus. travels north and returns to mainline US 15/US 29 about 0.5 miles (0.80 km) south of SR 28.

River Road (SR 1202), which intersects US 15 Bus./US 29 Bus. north of the Rappahannock River, is the pre-1930 alignment of US 15 (then also SR 32). The original bridge is long-gone.

=== Warrenton business loop ===
U.S. Route 15 Business
- Location: Warrenton, Virginia
- Tourist routes: Journey Through Hallowed Ground Byway; Virginia Byway

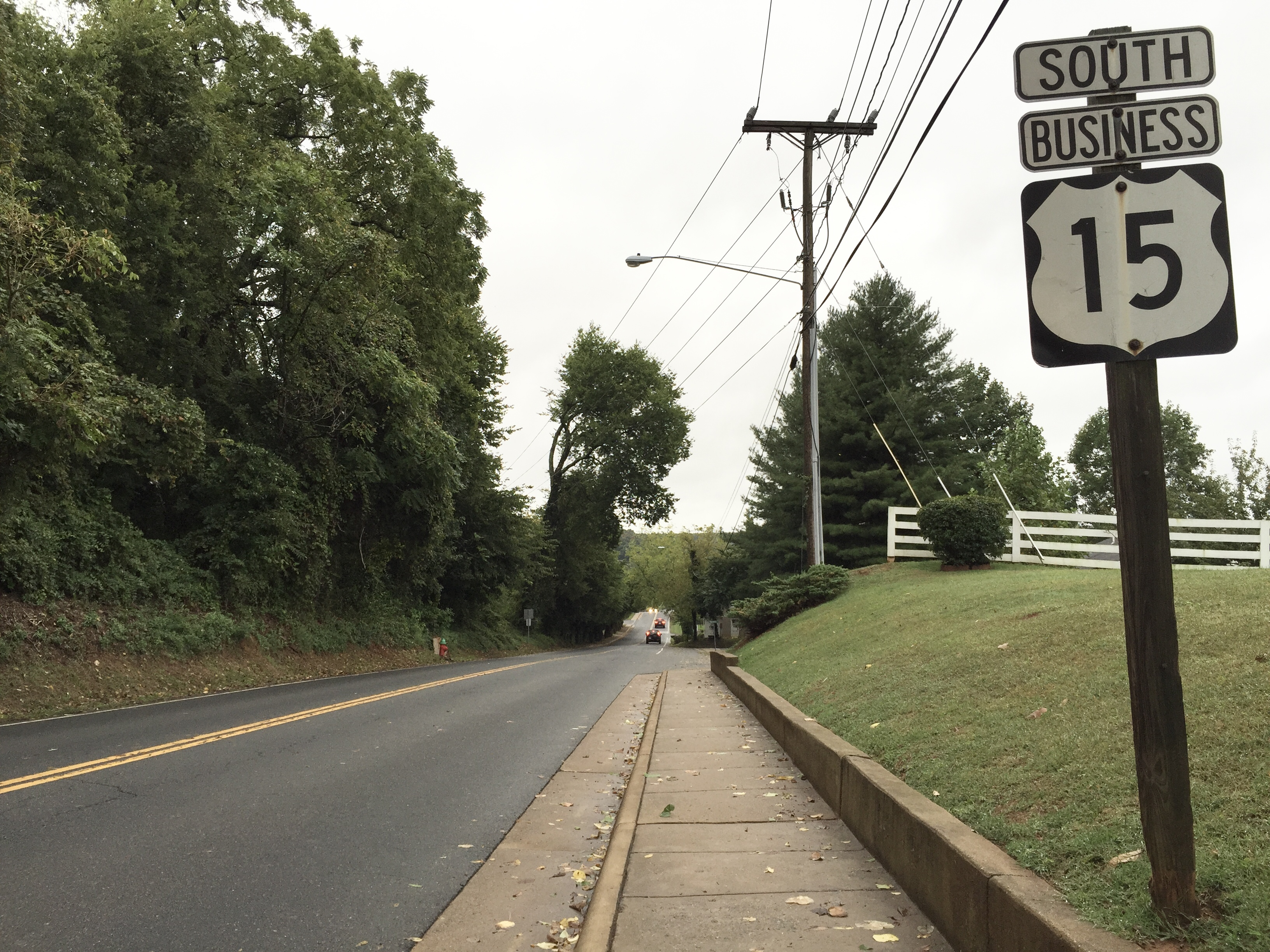
View south along US 15 Bus. in Warrenton

U.S. Route 15 Business (US 15 Bus.) in Warrenton, Virginia, is also US 17 Bus. and US 29 Bus., at least at the southern end. After James Madison Highway becomes Shirley Avenue, US 15 Bus. leaves this concurrency at Falmouth Street, while US 17 Bus./US 29 Bus. continues to the northwest. Two blocks after serving as the western terminus of SR 643, Falmouth Street intersects Mockingbird Lane and curves west to become Main Street, which runs through the heart of historic downtown Warrenton. As Main Street terminates at the corner of US 211 Bus. (Waterloo Street and Alexandria Pike), US 15 Bus. turns north in a concurrency with US 211 Bus. US 15 Bus./US 211 Bus. follows Alexandria Pike north until they move onto Blackwell Road before encountering at US 211/US 29 Bus. (Lee Highway) where US 211 and US 211 Bus. terminates, Blackwell Road becomes SR 672, and US 15 Bus. turns east on US 29 Bus. before finally terminating at an interchange with the northern end of the US 15/US 17/US 29 overlap.

=== Warrenton–Aldie temporary route ===
Temporary U.S. Route 15
- Location: Warrenton–Aldie, Virginia

=== Leesburg business loop ===
U.S. Route 15 Business
- Location: Leesburg, Virginia
- Tourist routes: Journey Through Hallowed Ground Byway; Virginia Byway

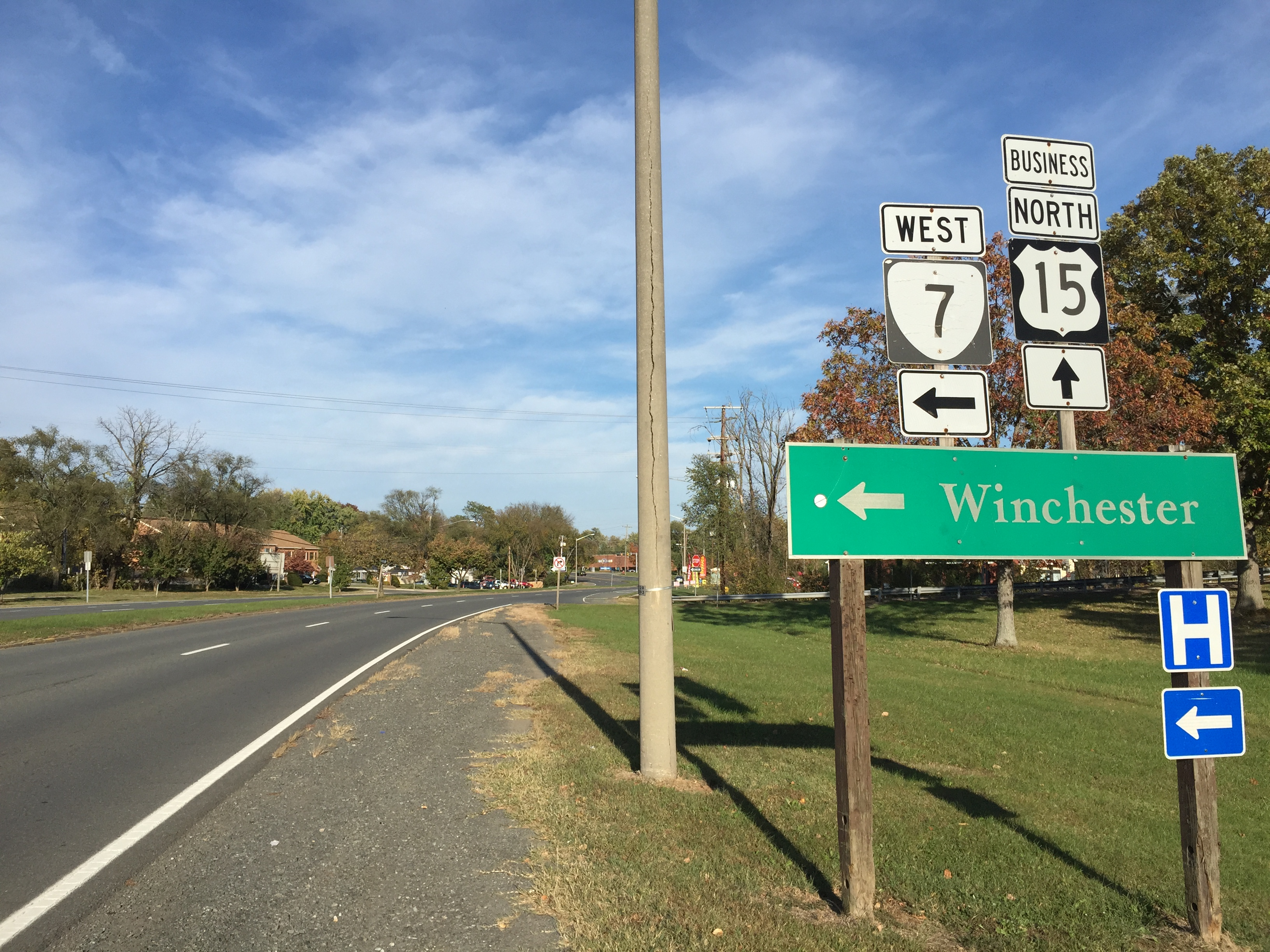
View north at the south end of US 15 Bus. at SR 7 in Leesburg

U.S. Route 15 Business (US 15 Bus.) separates from US 15 at SR 7 as it enters the town of Leesburg, Virginia, from the south as South King Street, following the Leesburg Bypass. It continues straight into the historic downtown area, crossing the Washington and Old Dominion Railroad Trail, the Town Branch creek, Royal Street, and Loudoun Street. US 15 Bus. crosses Market Street, SR 7 Bus., at the center of town, from which the town's four intercardinal sections radiate, and where the Loudoun County courthouse occupies the northeast corner. US 15 Bus. then changes names to North King Street and proceeds through the last few blocks of the historic district, crossing Cornwall and North streets. It continues past Union Cemetery, Ida Lee Park, and several schools. US 15 Bus. rejoins US 15 at the north end of Leesburg, just short of the Morven Park equestrian facilities.

=== Leesburg bypass route ===
U.S. Route 15 Bypass
- Location: Leesburg, Virginia

== Maryland ==
=== Emmitsburg business loop ===
U.S. Route 15 Business
- Seton Avenue
- Location: Emmitsburg, Maryland
- Length: 2.34 mi (3.77 km)
- Existed: 1967–present
- Tourist routes: Journey Through Hallowed Ground Byway

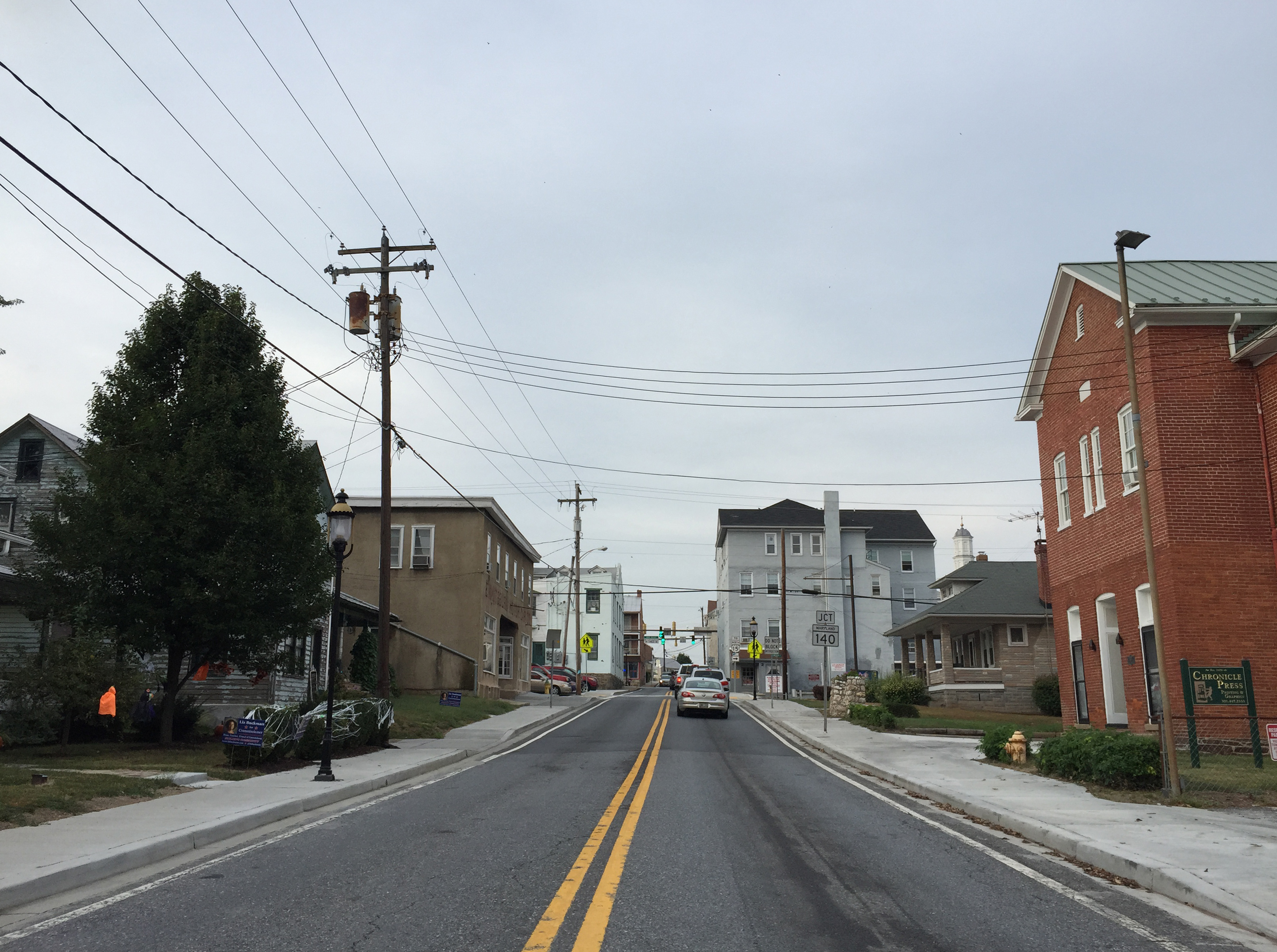
View north along US 15 Bus. in Emmitsburg

U.S. Route 15 Business (US 15 Bus.) is a business route of US 15 through Emmitsburg, Maryland. Known as Seton Avenue, the highway runs 2.34 miles (3.77 km) between junctions with US 15 on the south and north sides of the town. US 15 Bus. follows the original alignment of US 15 through Emmitsburg. The highway serves the Saint Joseph College and Mother Seton Shrine campusses, which are home to several emergency management institutions and a shrine dedicated to Elizabeth Ann Seton, the first person born in the U.S. to be canonized by the Catholic Church. The U.S. Highway's bypass of the town was constructed between 1963 and 1965. US 15 Bus. was assigned to the old alignment of US 15 from south of Emmitsburg to the Pennsylvania state line by 1967. The business route became unsigned by 1989 and was truncated at its present northern end by 1999.

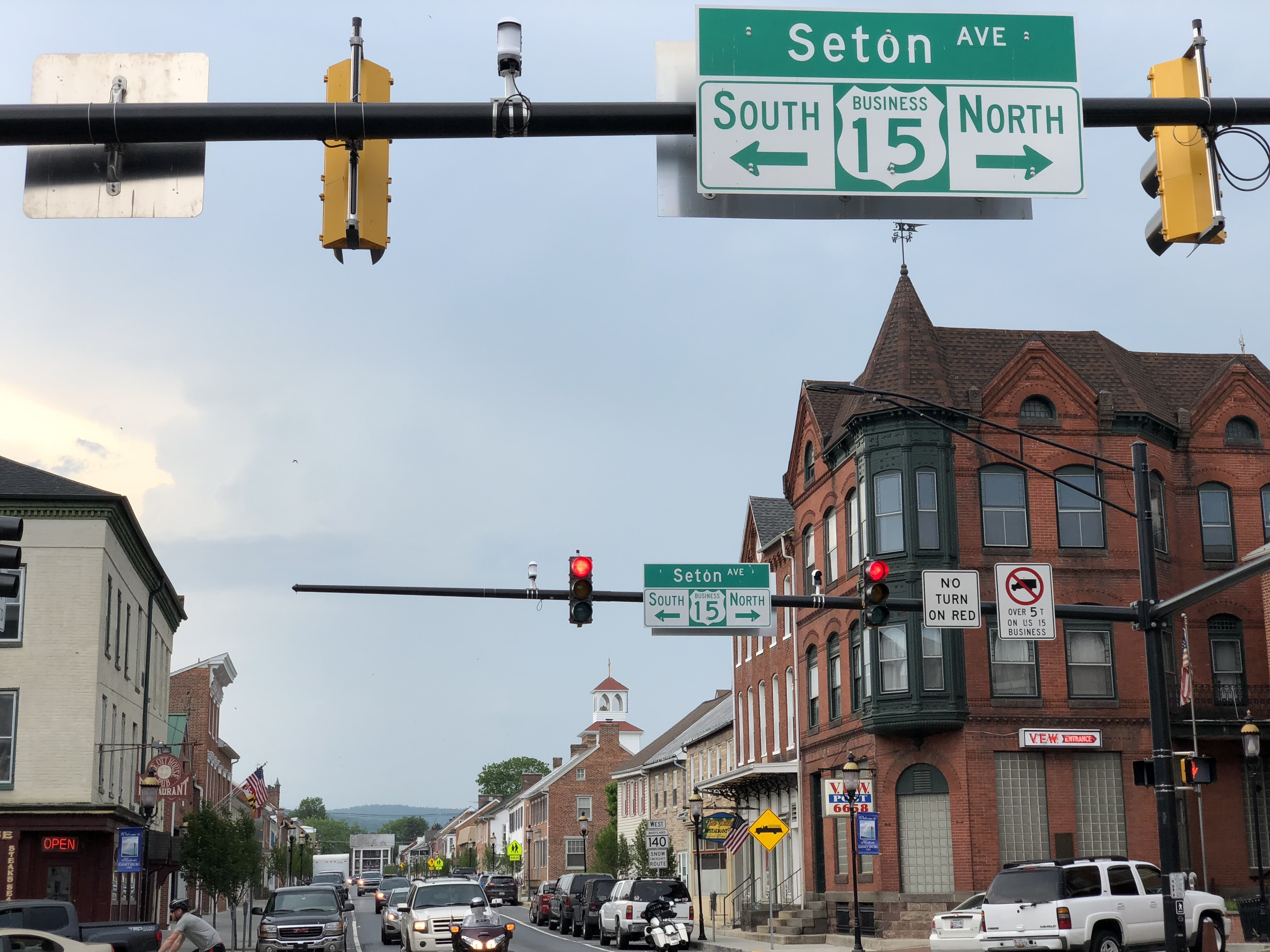
Signage for US 15 Bus. at MD 140 in Emmittsburg

US 15 Bus. begins at a superstreet intersection with US 15 (Catoctin Mountain Highway) opposite county-maintained Old Frederick Road. Access to northbound US 15 requires following southbound US 15 to a median U-turn. The superstreet intersection replaced a standard highway junction in 2004. US 15 Bus. heads north as a two-lane road that immediately intersects the old alignment of US 15, Old Emmitsburg Road, and crosses Toms Creek. The business route passes the campusses of St. Joseph College and Mother Seton Shrine. St. Joseph College is a defunct liberal arts college for women whose operations were absorbed by Mount St. Mary's University. The campus is now the National Emergency Training Center, a Federal Emergency Management Agency facility that is home of the National Fire Academy, the U.S. Fire Administration, the Emergency Management Institute, and National Fallen Firefighters Memorial. The Seton Shrine comprises the basilica of the National Shrine of St. Elizabeth Ann Seton and St. Joseph's Provincial House of the Daughters of Charity of Saint Vincent de Paul.

US 15 Bus. continues north into the Emmitsburg Historic District, where the highway intersects Maryland Route 140 (MD 140; Main Street) and passes St. Euphemia's School and Sisters' House. The business route veers northeast and crosses Flat Run before approaching its northern terminus at US 15. Traffic from northbound US 15 Bus. to northbound US 15 is required to follow the ramp to southbound US 15 and turn around at US 15's interchange with MD 140. US 15 Bus. continues north to North Seton Avenue, a service road that parallels the southbound direction of US 15 toward the Pennsylvania state line. That intersection is connected to a one-way southbound ramp from US 15's intersection with Welty Road. The intersection was changed to remove access from northbound US 15 Bus. to northbound US 15 in 2007. East of US 15, Welty Road immediately intersects Old Gettysburg Road, the old alignment of US 15 north toward Gettysburg, Pennsylvania.

== Pennsylvania ==
=== Gettysburg business loop ===
U.S. Route 15 Business
- Location: Gettysburg, Pennsylvania
- Length: 14 mi (23 km)
- Tourist routes: Journey Through Hallowed Ground Byway

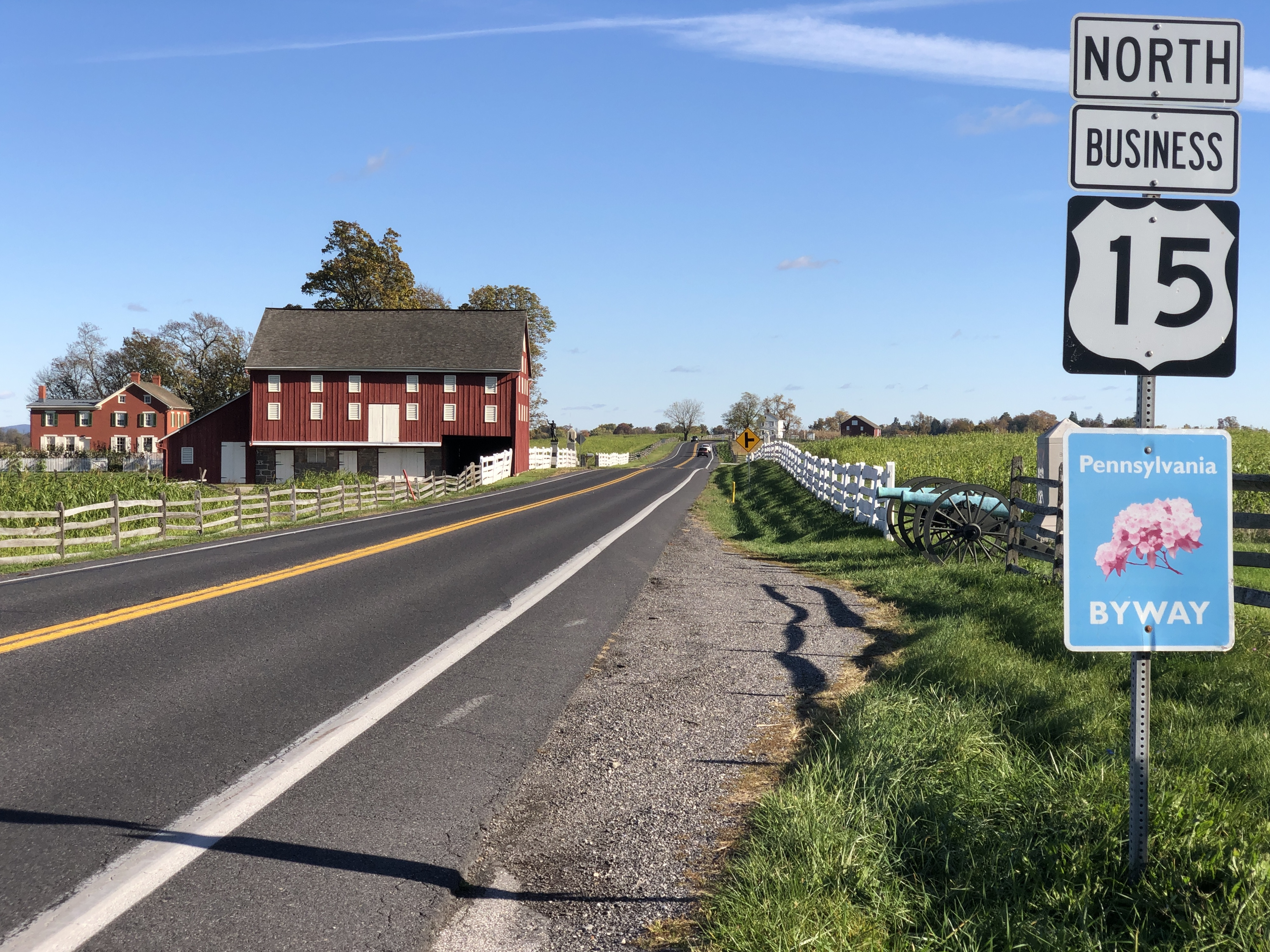
US 15 Bus. northbound in the Gettysburg National Military Park

U.S. Route 15 Business (US 15 Bus.) is a surface road in Adams County, Pennsylvania, that serves as a through street in the Gettysburg area. It marks the original incarnation of US 15, before a freeway bypass was created.

The southernmost portion of the business loop is lightly traveled, serving as a rolling connecting route between the more utilized portions of this highway and a similar business loop in Emmitsburg, Maryland. The road's designation officially begins at the Pennsylvania–Maryland state line in Freedom Township. South of the Gettysburg National Military Park, the road is narrow and features infrequent development, while, at its southern edges, a small number tourist facilities appear. Traffic picks up greatly during peak travel months through the park, which uses this highway as one of two main access ways. At the northern border of the greenspace, the route becomes Gettysburg's main street, featuring many stoplights and often cars parked on both sides of the street. North of the city center near Gettysburg College, large homes line the street. The highway then turns northeast, passing as an overly narrow route past commercial development, before traveling into sparsely populated farm county. In unincorporated Shrivers Corner, the route meets up with Pennsylvania Route 394, with which it is cosigned for its final one-half mile (0.80 km), as it passes into a US 15 freeway juncture.

Major intersections

The entire route is in Adams County.

| Location | mi | km | Destinations | Notes |
|---|---|---|---|---|
| Freedom Township | 0.00 | 0.00 | Old Gettysburg Road south | Maryland state line; southern terminus |
| Freedom Township | 1.60 | 2.57 | US 15 – Frederick, Harrisburg | Interchange |
| Gettysburg | 7.95 | 12.79 | PA 134 south (Taneytown Road) – Taneytown | Northern terminus of PA 134 |
| Gettysburg | 8.54 | 13.74 | PA 116 west (Middle Street) – Fairfield, Carroll Valley | South end of PA 116 overlap |
| Gettysburg | 8.61 | 13.86 | US 30 / PA 116 east (Chambersburg Street/York Street) | Traffic circle; north end of PA 116 overlap |
| Gettysburg | 9.10 | 14.65 | PA 34 north (Carlisle Street) – Carlisle | Southern terminus of PA 34 |
| Straban Township | 13.58 | 21.85 | PA 394 west (Shrivers Corners Road) – Biglerville | South end of PA 394 overlap |
| Straban Township | 13.99 | 22.51 | US 15 – Harrisburg, Frederick PA 394 east (Shrivers Corners Road) – Hunterstown | Interchange; northern terminus; north end of PA 394 overlap |
1.000 mi = 1.609 km; 1.000 km = 0.621 mi: Concurrency terminus

=== Shamokin Dam business loop ===
U.S. Route 15 Business
- Location: Shamokin Dam, Pennsylvania

U.S. Route 15 Business (US 15 Bus.) is a proposed business route of US 15 through Shamokin Dam, Pennsylvania, that will be designated onto the current alignment of US 15 once US 15 is relocated to the Central Susquehanna Valley Thruway between Selinsgrove and Union Township. The southern portion of US 15 Bus. will run concurrent with US 11.

=== Mansfield business loop ===
U.S. Route 15 Business
- Location: Mansfield, Pennsylvania
- Length: 4 mi (6.4 km)

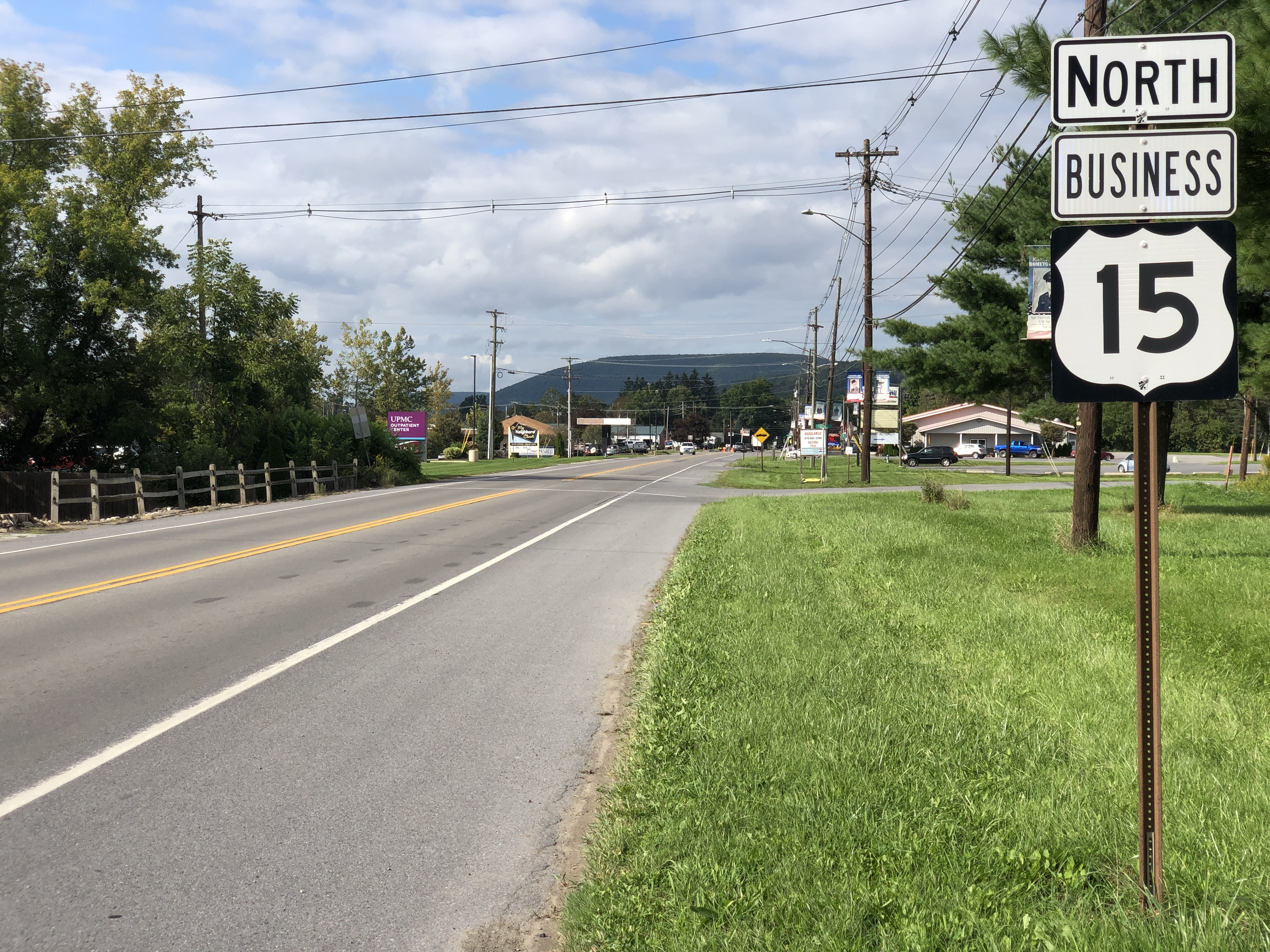
US 15 Bus. northbound just after entering Mansfield

U.S. Route 15 Business (US 15 Bus.) is a surface road in Tioga County, Pennsylvania, that serves as a through street in the Mansfield area. It marks the original incarnation of US 15, before a freeway bypass was created.

The route begins in the south in an area that features a variety of commercial development, including the area's fast-food and big-box stores. After passing through a light industrial section, the road moves into the borough of Mansfield. The business loop serves as the area's main north–south street, while US 6 is the key east–west street. After leaving the borough, it briefly travels along the forested Tioga River, before meeting a freeway junction.

Major intersections

The entire route is in Tioga County.

| Location | mi | km | Destinations | Notes |
|---|---|---|---|---|
| Richmond Township | 0.00 | 0.00 | I-99 / US 15 / PA 660 west – Williamsport, Corning | Southern terminus; eastern terminus of PA 660; exit 179 on I-99 |
| Mansfield | 2.25 | 3.62 | US 6 (Wellsboro Street) to I-99 / US 15 – Mansfield University | |
| Richmond Township | 3.55 | 5.71 | I-99 north / US 15 north – Corning | Northern terminus; exit 183 on I-99 |
1.000 mi = 1.609 km; 1.000 km = 0.621 mi

== See also ==
- List of special routes of the United States Numbered Highway System
