= Euphemia Blenkinsop =

Irish-born American religious sister and teacher

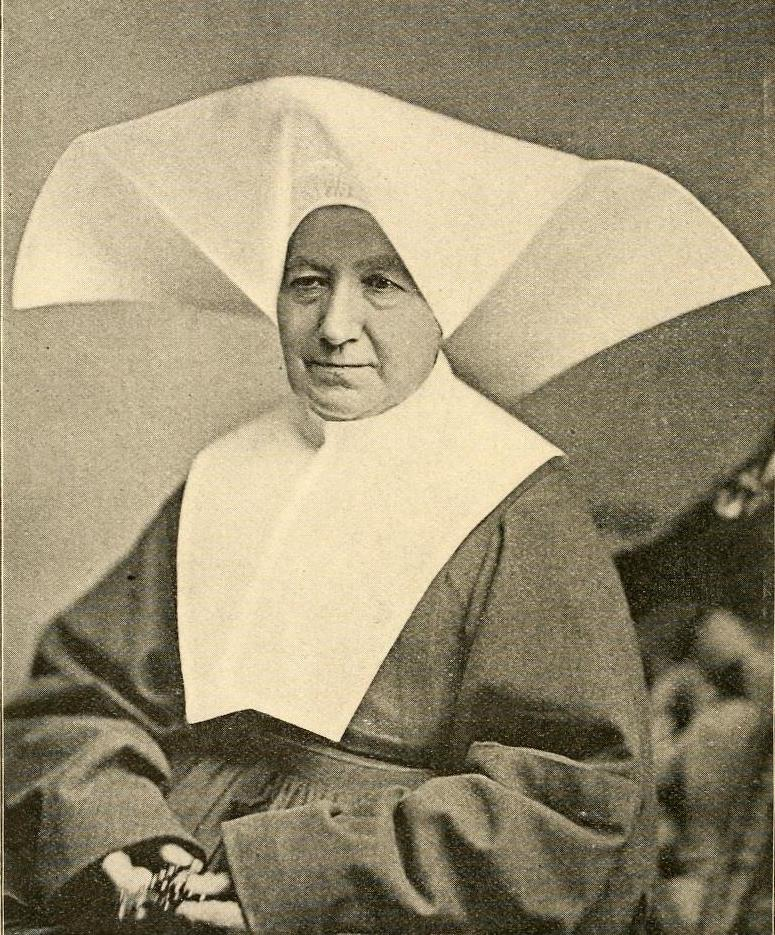
- Mother Euphemia, from an 1897 publication.
- Born: Catherine Blenkinsop; April 18, 1816; Dublin, Ireland
- Died: March 18, 1887 (aged 70); Emmitsburg, Maryland
- Other names: Sister Euphemia, Mother Euphemia
- Occupation(s): teacher, religious sister
- Relatives: Peter J. Blenkinsop (brother)

Euphemia Blenkinsop (April 18, 1816 – March 18, 1887), born Catherine Blenkinsop, also known as Mother Euphemia, was an Irish-born American religious sister and teacher, and visitatrix (provincial leader) of the Daughters of Charity in the United States, from 1866 to her death in 1887.

== Early life ==
Catherine Blenkinsop was born April 18, 1816, in Dublin, the daughter of Peter J. Blenkinsop and Mary Kelly Blenkinsop. Her father ran a Catholic publishing house and bookstore in Baltimore. Her maternal uncle was Archbishop Oliver Kelly of Tuam. One of her brothers, Peter J. Blenkinsop, became a Jesuit priest and college president. Her other brother, William Aloysius Blenkinsop, also became a priest.

The Blenkinsop family immigrated to the United States in 1826. In 1831, Catherine Blenkinsop entered the Sisters of Charity community in Emmitsburg, Maryland.

== Sisters of Charity ==
As Sister Catherine Euphemia, she taught in Roman Catholic schools in New York City and Baltimore for more than twenty years. She was a member of the order when it united with the Daughters of Charity of Saint Vincent de Paul in 1850. In 1866, she succeeded her mentor Mother Ann Simeon as visitatrix of the Daughters of Charity in the United States, and mother superior of the order's Mother House, St. Joseph's Sisterhood, in Emmitsburg. She was the head of the order in 1885 when a kitchen fire badly damaged two of the buildings on their campus.

== During the Civil War ==
During the American Civil War, the Daughters of Charity worked as nurses, treating wounded soldiers. "The soldiers asked one another, 'How is it that the sisters do not tremble?'", Blenkinsop wrote in an 1862 report. "Others asked the sisters what we should do if the enemy should reach us in triumph! 'We should remain at our post!'" Sister Euphemia was appointed to represent the order's leadership in the American South. Because written communication was difficult in wartime, she was sent in person to visit Daughters of Charity congregations in Confederate territory, at some personal risk. She spent Christmas Day, 1863, in New Orleans.

== Personal life and legacy ==
Mother Euphemia's failing health was announced by the order in dramatic terms: "A sorrow is slowly approaching, as the Grim Destroyer, with stealthy steps, draws nearer and nearer to the beloved Mother's couch." She died March 18, 1887, in Emmitsburg.

In 1899, St. Euphemia's School and Sisters' House in Emmitsburg was named for her patron saint, in her memory. St. Euphemia's School closed in 1956. but the building was placed on the National Register of Historic Places in 1984.
