= St. Euphemia's School and Sisters' House =

Historic buildings in Maryland, US

- U.S. National Register of Historic Places
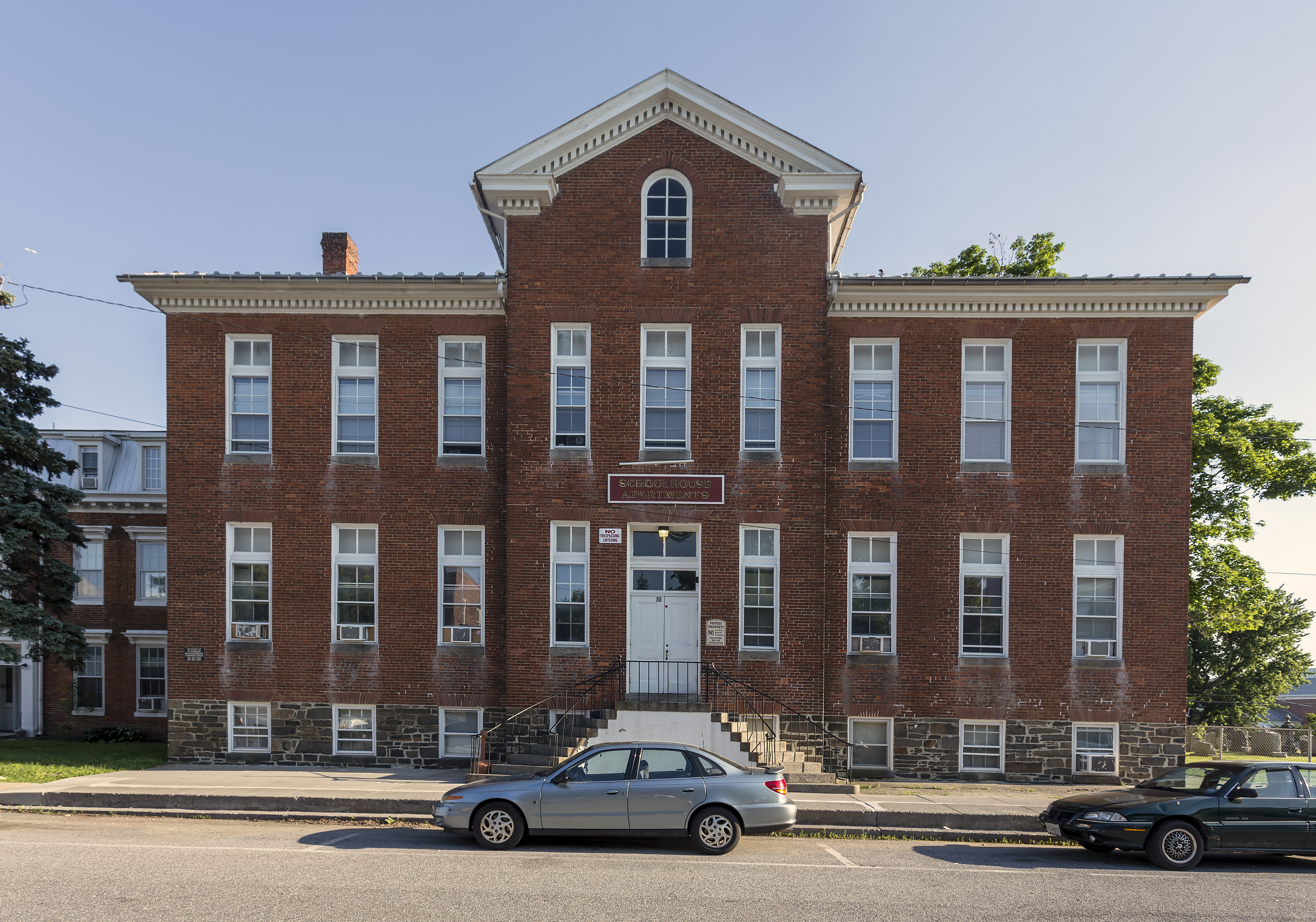

- Location within Maryland Location within the United States
- Location: 5052 DePaul St., Emmitsburg, Maryland
- Coordinates: 39°42′19″N 77°19′31″W
- Area: less than one acre
- Built: 1890
- Architect: Tyson & Lansinger
- NRHP reference No.: 84001770
- Added to NRHP: September 13, 1984

St. Euphemia's School and Sisters' House is a historic school building and convent located at Emmitsburg, Frederick County, Maryland. It is a late-19th century school complex that consists of two attached brick buildings: a two and half story school building built about 1890, and a house that was used as a convent and built about 1860.

It was named after the patron saint of sister Euphemia Blenkinsop in 1899 as a tribute to her memory. It was listed on the National Register of Historic Places in 1984.
