= South Carolina Highway 102 =

State highway in South Carolina, United States

South Carolina Highway 102

Route information
- Maintained by SCDOT
- Length: 25.550 mi (41.119 km)

Major junctions
- West end: US 15 Bus. in North Hartsville
- US 1 in Patrick
- East end: SC 9 in Chesterfield

Location
- Country: United States
- State: South Carolina
- Counties: Darlington, Chesterfield

Highway system
- South Carolina State Highway System; Interstate; US; State; Scenic
← SC 101	→ SC 105

South Carolina Highway 102 (SC 102) is a 25.550-mile-long (41.119 km) state highway in the U.S. state of South Carolina. The highway connects North Hartsville and Chesterfield, via Patrick. It is designated as an east–west highway (with its official eastern terminus in North Hartsville) though it travels north and south.

== Route description ==
SC 102 begins at an intersection with U.S. Route 15 Business (US 15 Bus.; North 5th Street) in North Hartsville, within Darlington County, where the roadway continues as Patrick Highway. It travels to the north-northeast and leaves the city limits of the city. It travels through rural areas of the county. Then, it crosses over Cedar Creek, where it enters Chesterfield County. SC 102 curves to the north-northwest for a short while before traveling in a fairly northerly direction. Just before entering Patrick, the highway goes through Sand Hills State Forest. In town is an intersection with US 1 (Main Street). It winds its way through rural areas of the county until it meets its northern terminus, an intersection with SC 9 (East Boulevard) in Chesterfield, where the roadway continues as South Craig Street.

== Major intersections ==
County	Location	mi	km	Destinations	Notes
Darlington	North Hartsville	0.000	0.000	US 15 Bus. (North 5th Street) / Patrick Highway – Hartsville	Western terminus
Chesterfield	Patrick	13.280	21.372	US 1 (Main Street) – McBee, Cheraw	
Chesterfield	Chesterfield	25.550	41.119	SC 9 (East Boulevard) / South Craig Street – Pageland, Cheraw	Eastern terminus
1.000 mi = 1.609 km; 1.000 km = 0.621 mi
