= North Hartsville, South Carolina =

- Census-designated place
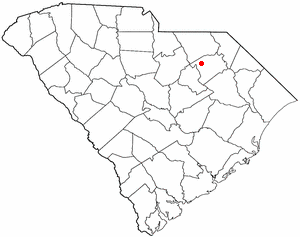
- Location of North Hartsville, South Carolina
- Coordinates: 34°24′04″N 80°04′15″W
- Country: United States
- State: South Carolina
- County: Darlington

Area
  - Total: 4.53 sq mi (11.74 km^{2})
  - Land: 4.53 sq mi (11.73 km^{2})
  - Water: 0.0077 sq mi (0.02 km^{2})
- Elevation: 210 ft (64 m)

Population (2020)
  - Total: 2,775
  - Density: 612.8/sq mi (236.59/km^{2})
- Time zone: UTC-5 (Eastern (EST))
  - Summer (DST): UTC-4 (EDT)
- ZIP code: 29550
- Area codes: 843 and 854
- FIPS code: 45-51145
- GNIS feature ID: 2403351

North Hartsville is a census-designated place (CDP) in Darlington County, South Carolina, United States. The population was 3,251 at the 2010 census. It is part of the Florence Metropolitan Statistical Area and the Hartsville Urban Cluster.

== Geography ==
North Hartsville is located in northwestern Darlington County. It is bordered to the south, across Prestwood Lake and Black Creek, by Hartsville, the largest city in Darlington County.

Business Route 15 (N. 5th Street) is the main road through the CDP. South Carolina Highway 102 (Patrick Highway) leaves north from Business 15 at the east end of town. Society Hill is 15 miles (24 km) to the northeast via US 15, while Patrick is 14 miles (23 km) to the north via SC 102. Darlington, the county seat, is 15 miles (24 km) to the southeast.

According to the United States Census Bureau, the North Hartsville CDP has a total area of 4.6 square miles (11.8 km^{2}), of which 0.004 square miles (0.01 km^{2}), or 0.13%, is water.

== Demographics ==
Historical population
Census	Pop.	Note	%±
2020	2,775		—
U.S. Decennial Census

As of the census of 2000, there were 3,136 people, 1,226 households, and 886 families residing in the CDP. The population density was 645.8 inhabitants per square mile (249.3/km^{2}). There were 1,406 housing units at an average density of 289.5 per square mile (111.8/km^{2}). The racial makeup of the CDP was 75.89% White, 21.56% African American, 0.48% Native American, 0.35% Asian, 1.31% from other races, and 0.41% from two or more races. Hispanic or Latino of any race were 2.39% of the population.

There were 1,226 households, out of which 33.6% had children under the age of 18 living with them, 53.1% were married couples living together, 14.3% had a female householder with no husband present, and 27.7% were non-families. 24.4% of all households were made up of individuals, and 8.3% had someone living alone who was 65 years of age or older. The average household size was 2.56 and the average family size was 3.03.

In the CDP, the population was spread out, with 26.7% under the age of 18, 7.0% from 18 to 24, 30.1% from 25 to 44, 25.6% from 45 to 64, and 10.6% who were 65 years of age or older. The median age was 36 years. For every 100 females, there were 94.2 males. For every 100 females age 18 and over, there were 90.7 males.

The median income for a household in the CDP was $41,016, and the median income for a family was $47,566. Males had a median income of $43,967 versus $25,186 for females. The per capita income for the CDP was $22,376. About 12.3% of families and 15.4% of the population were below the poverty line, including 22.2% of those under age 18 and 15.2% of those age 65 or over.
