= Emmitsburg Historic District =

Historic district in Maryland, United States

- U.S. National Register of Historic Places
- U.S. Historic district
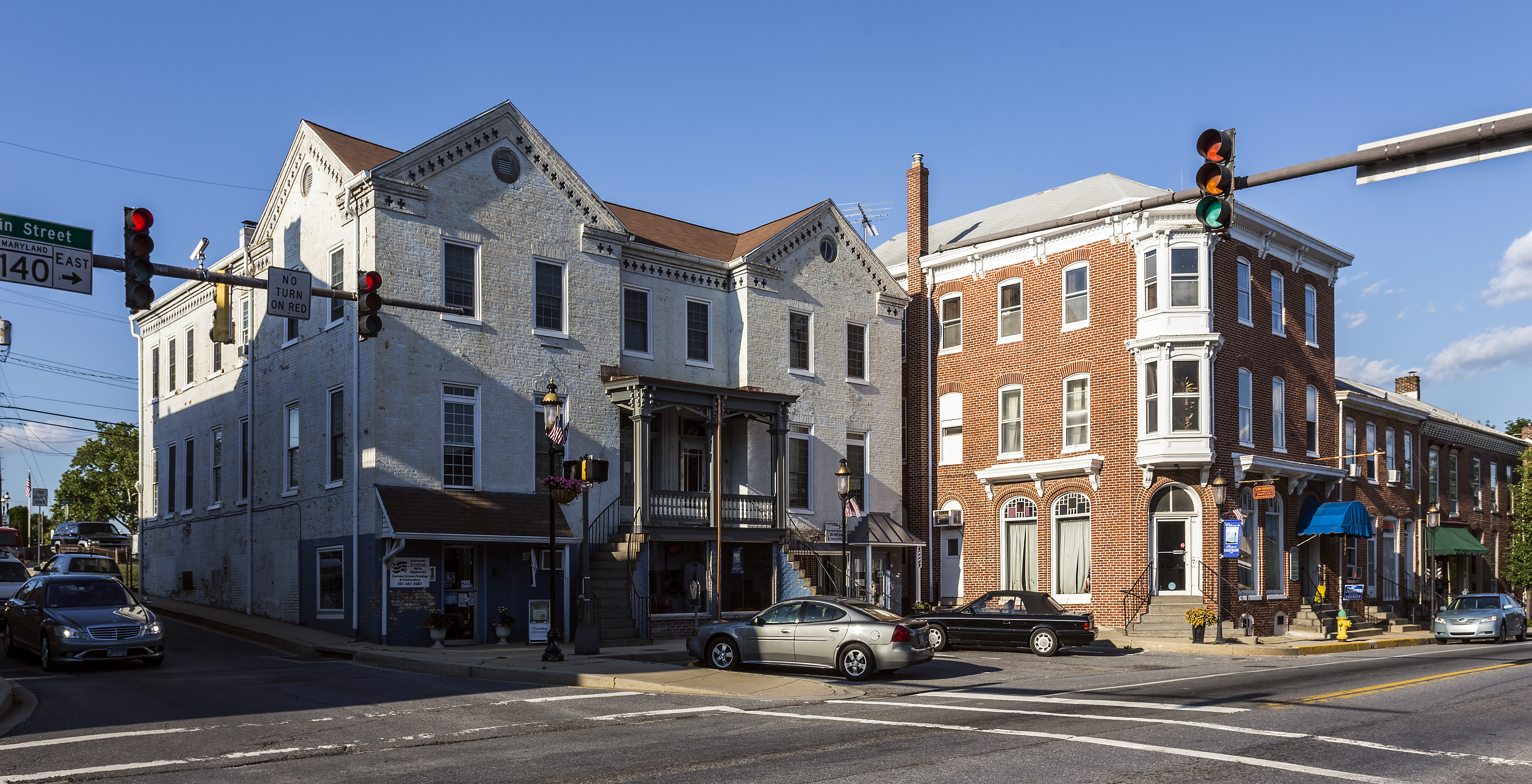
- Emmitsburg town square

- Location within Maryland Location within the United States
- Location: Roughly, Main St. E of Mountain View Cemetery to Creamery Rd. and Seton Ave. adjacent to Main, Emmitsburg, Maryland
- Coordinates: 39°42′16″N 77°19′40″W
- Area: 54 acres (22 ha)
- Built: 1785
- Architectural style: Greek Revival, Italianate, Federal
- NRHP reference No.: 92000076
- Added to NRHP: March 10, 1992

The Emmitsburg Historic District is a national historic district in Emmitsburg, Frederick County, Maryland. The district is predominantly residential and includes most of the older area of the town extending along Main Street and Seton Avenue. Also included are several commercial buildings and churches interspersed among the dwellings. The buildings are primarily two-story sided log or brick, dating from the late 18th to the mid 19th centuries. Some later 19th century buildings in this area include some large Italianate-influenced buildings forming the northeast and southeast corners of the main square; an area destroyed by fire in 1863. Settlement began in the region during the 1730s, bringing Protestant Germans and Scotch-Irish from Pennsylvania, as well as English Catholics from Tidewater Maryland.

It was added to the National Register of Historic Places in 1992.
