= Emmitsburg, Maryland =

Emmitsburg
- Town
- Town of Emmitsburg
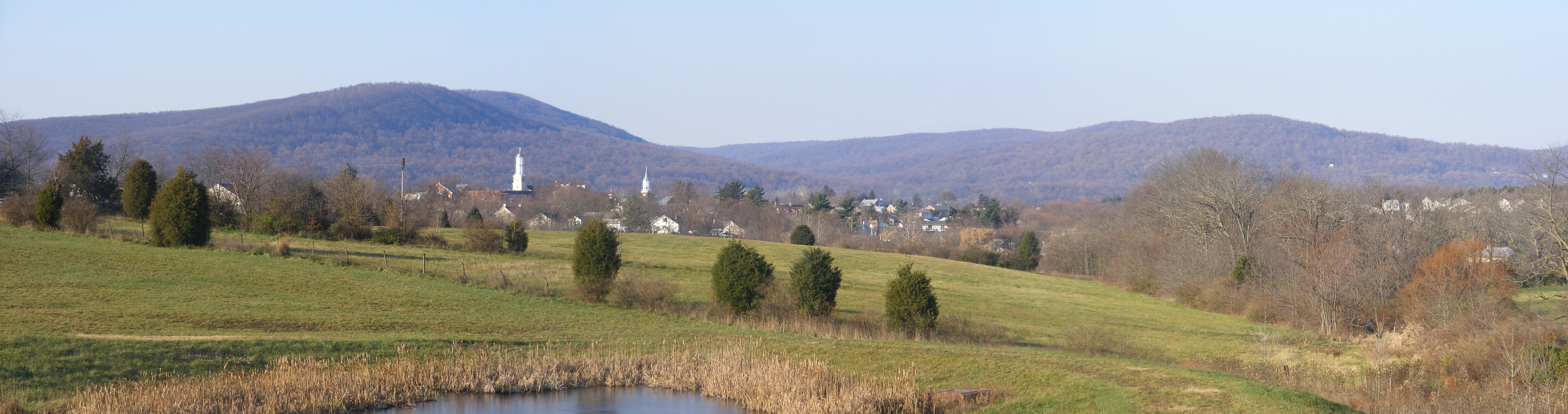
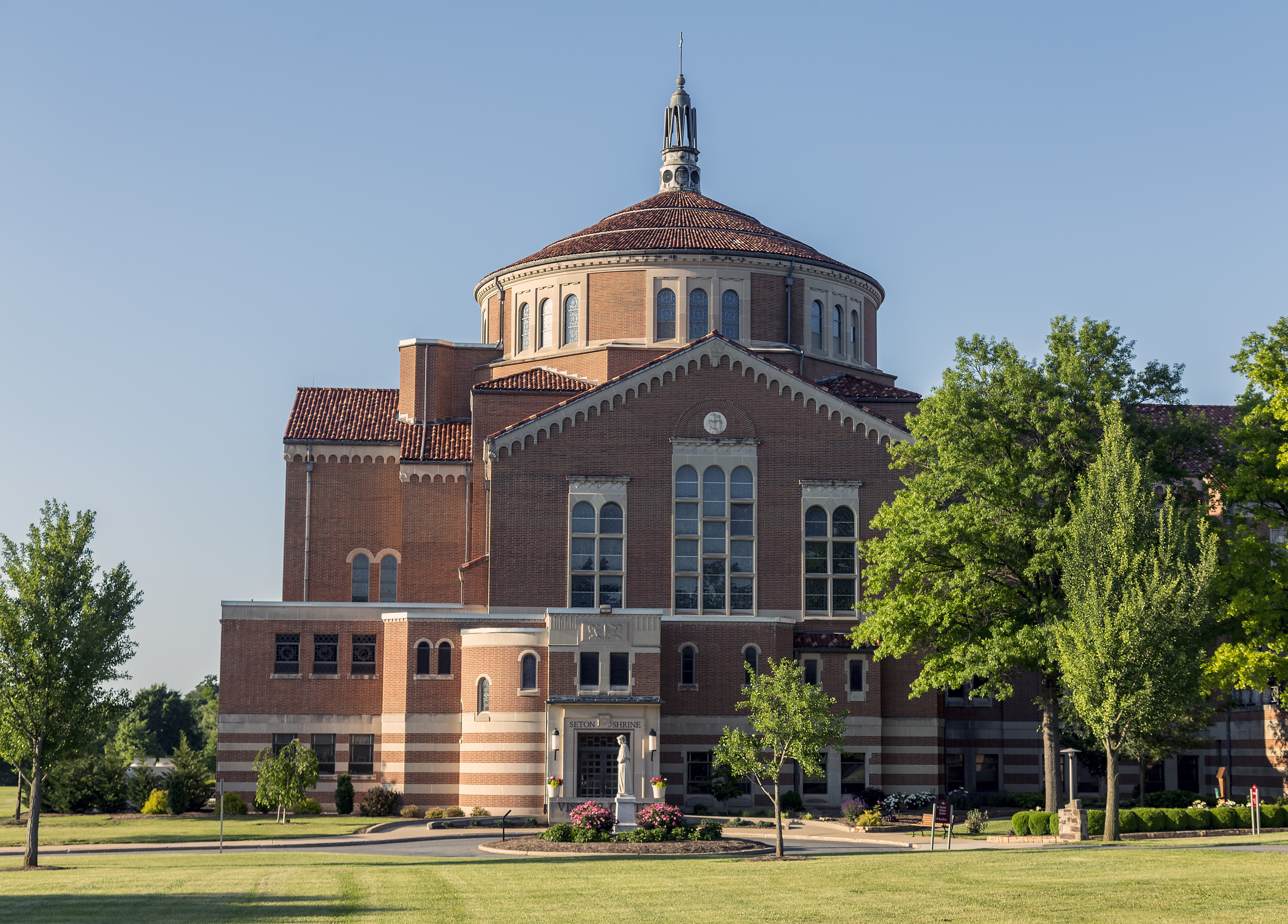
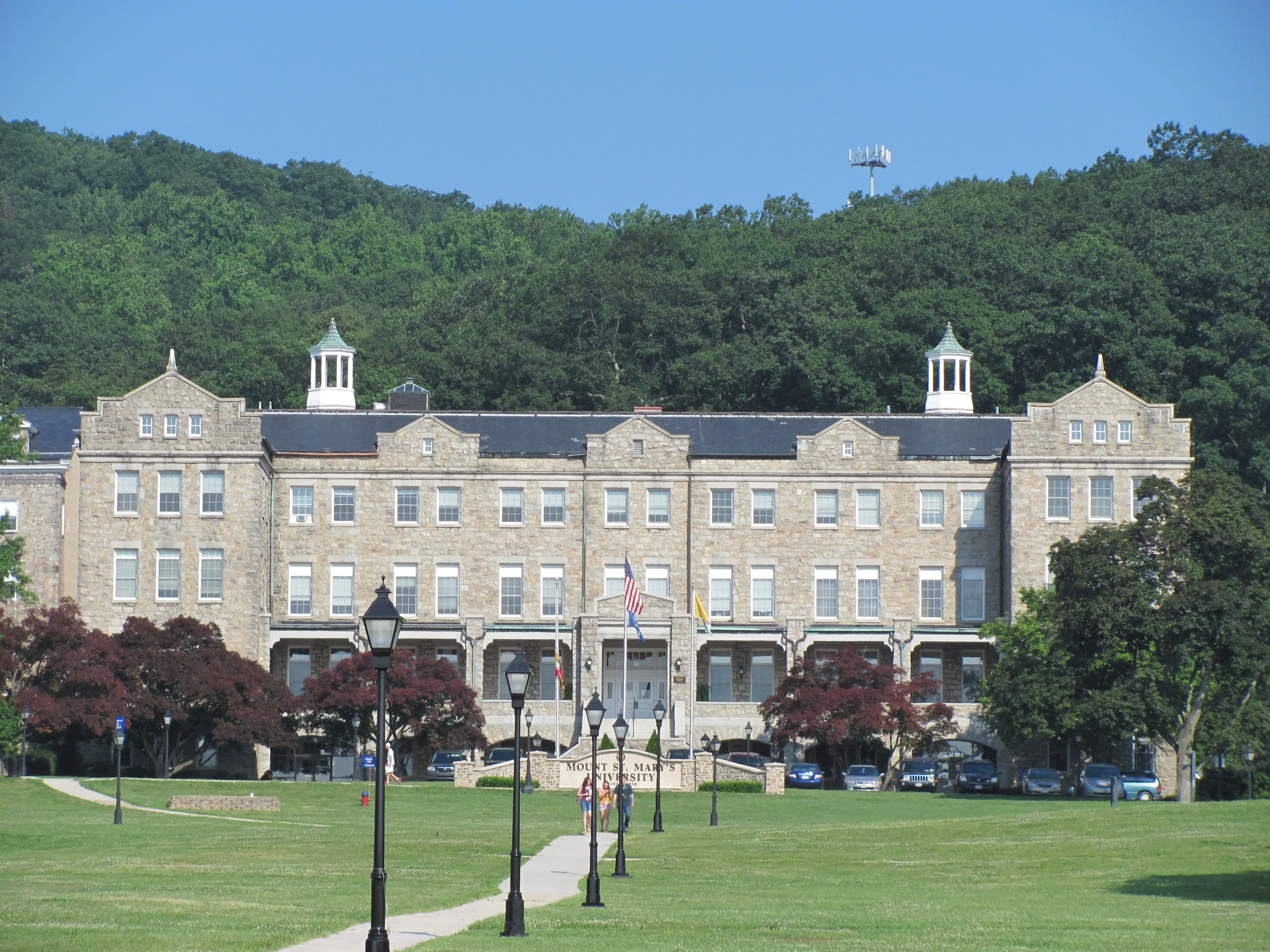
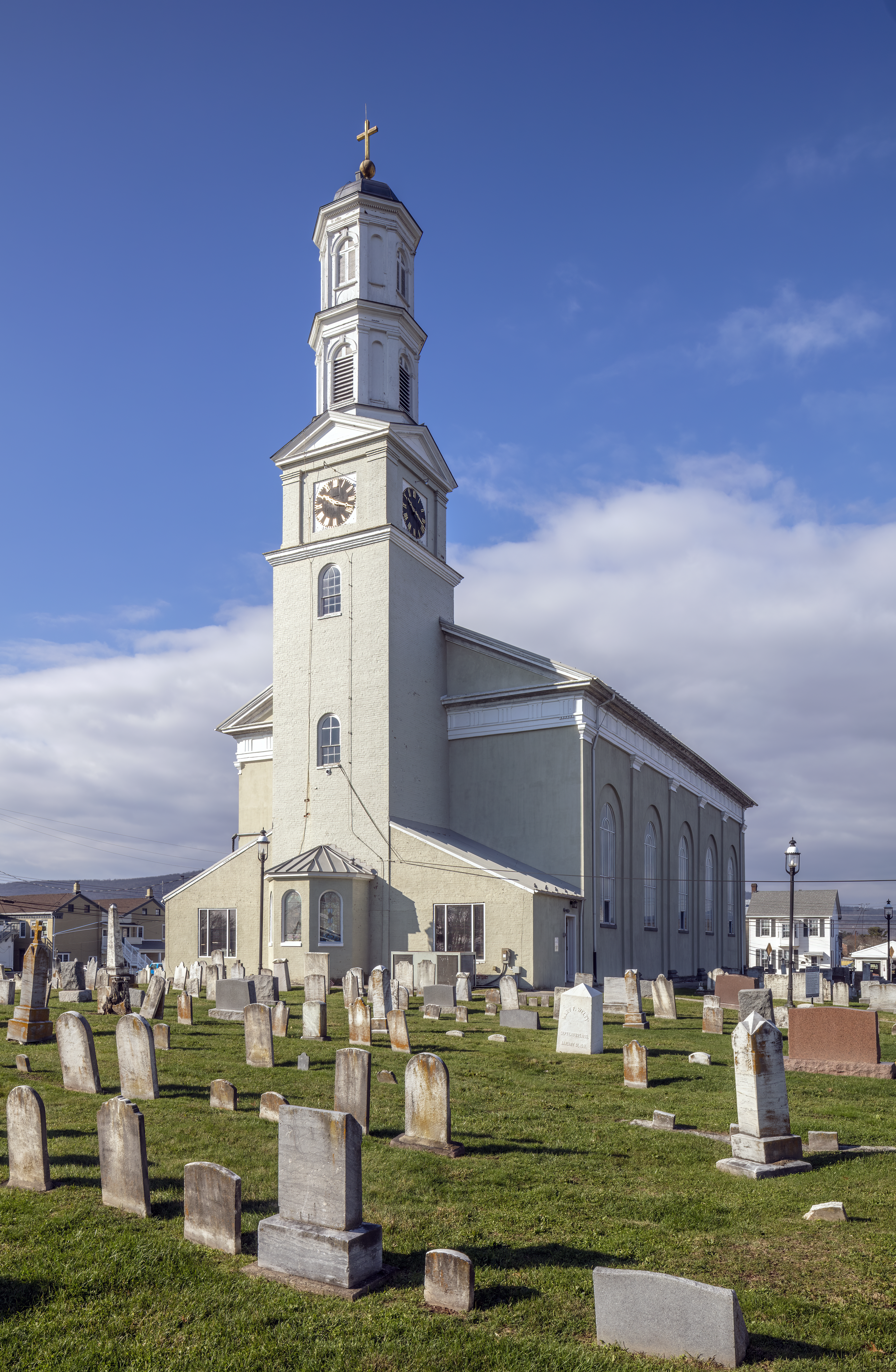
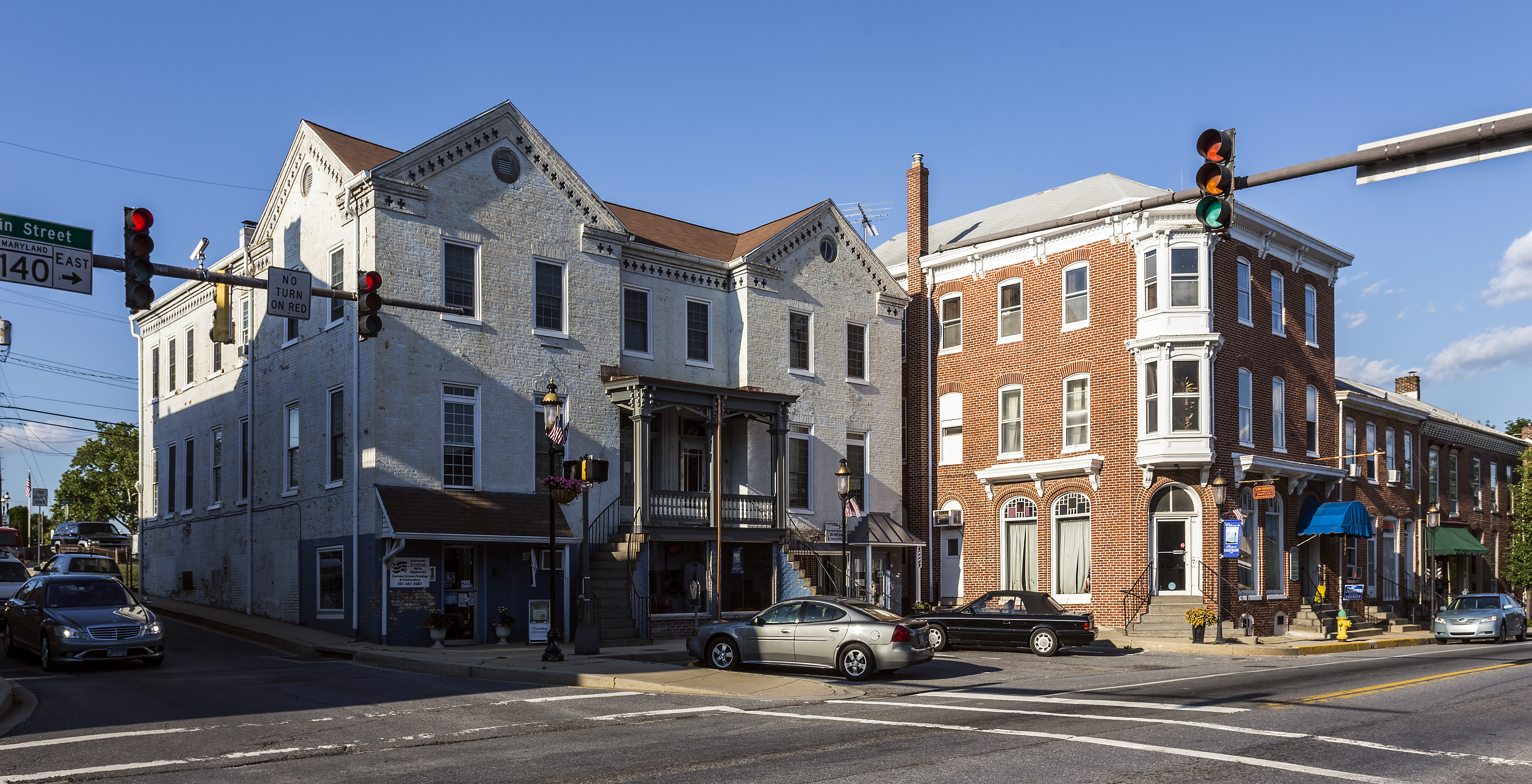
- Panoramic view of Emmitsburg from US-15 Rest Area National Shrine of St. Elizabeth Ann Seton Mount St. Mary's University (outside of the city limits) St. Joseph's Catholic Church Emmitsburg Historic District

- Flag Seal

- Location of Emmitsburg, Maryland
- Coordinates: 39°42′15″N 77°19′16″W
- Country: United States
- State: Maryland
- County: Frederick
- Founded: 1785
- Incorporated: 1825

Area
  - Total: 1.64 sq mi (4.24 km^{2})
  - Land: 1.62 sq mi (4.19 km^{2})
  - Water: 0.019 sq mi (0.05 km^{2})
- Elevation: 400 ft (120 m)

Population (2020)
  - Total: 2,770
  - Density: 1,713.2/sq mi (661.46/km^{2})
- Time zone: UTC−5 (Eastern (EST))
  - Summer (DST): UTC−4 (EDT)
- ZIP Code: 21727
- Area codes: 301, 240
- FIPS code: 24-26200
- GNIS feature ID: 2390171
- Website: www.emmitsburgmd.gov

Emmitsburg is a town in Frederick County, Maryland, United States, 0.3 miles (0.5 km) south of the Mason–Dixon line separating Maryland from Pennsylvania.

Founded in 1785, Emmitsburg is in proximity to Mount St. Mary's University. The Basilica and National Shrine of St. Elizabeth Ann Seton, who was the first native-born United States citizen to be canonized as a saint, is in the city limits, while National Shrine Grotto of Our Lady of Lourdes, another Catholic pilgrimage site, is on the university property. The Seton Shrine is one of the top eight Catholic pilgrimage destinations in the United States. The National Emergency Training Center (NETC) campus is in Emmitsburg, located on the former campus of Saint Joseph College. The campus includes the Emergency Management Institute, the National Fire Academy and the National Fallen Firefighters Memorial.

The population as of the 2020 United States census was 2,776. The current mayor of Emmitsburg is Frank Davis (Term ends October 2029). The current commissioners are President Jim Hoover (October 2027), Vice President Rosario Benvengi (October 2028), Cliff Sweeney (October 2027), Kevin Hagan (October 2028), and Mike Myers (October 2029).

== History ==
Emmitsburg was named for its founder, William Emmit, in 1785. However, a settlement (named first "Silver Fancy" and later "Poplar Fields") preceded the town, particularly since British authorities restricted colonists' expansion during and after the French and Indian War.

In 1757 Lutherans led by pastor George Bager built a church, which they shared with a German Reformed congregation until 1798. After the American Revolutionary War, Catholic missionary Rev. Jean Dubois established a mission church, then a seminary, at Emmitsburg. Later Elizabeth Ann Seton established a convent, with a school and hospital. Soon, the number of Methodists in Emmitsburg led to the formation of a circuit around town, rather than share a minister with Gettysburg, Pennsylvania.

The Union fortified Emmitsburg to stop the Confederate invasion of the Union territory in June 1863 during the American Civil War. Half the town was burned to the ground in a mysterious fire on the night of June 23. Folklore has it that "The Great Fire", as it was known, was started by a Union sympathizer to prevent advancing Confederates from taking supplies from the town. However fate spared the town a battle between the opposing forces, which instead took place 12 miles north of it in Pennsylvania near the town of Gettysburg. The town was briefly held by the retreating Confederates on July 4.

== Geography ==
According to the United States Census Bureau, the town has a total area of 1.52 square miles (3.94 km^{2}), all land.

=== Climate ===
Emmitsburg has a humid continental climate (Köppen Dfa) with hot, humid summers and moderately cold winters (humid subtropical climate using the -3 degrees c isotherm). It is known for being located near the base of Catoctin Mountain.

Emmitsburg, MD

Climate chart (precipitation, max. and min. temperature)
J	F	M	A	M	J	J	A	S	O	N	D
3.7 39 22	3 42 23	4 52 30	3.8 63 39	4.5 72 50	4.4 81 59	3.6 85 64	3.6 83 62	4.3 76 55	3.5 65 43	3.8 54 34	3.3 43 26
- █ Average max. and min. temperatures in °F
- █ Precipitation totals in inches
- Source: NOAA
Metric conversion
J	F	M	A	M	J	J	A	S	O	N	D
93 4 −6	75 6 −5	100 11 −1	97 17 4	115 22 10	110 27 15	92 29 18	91 28 17	108 24 13	88 18 6	97 12 1	84 6 −3
- █ Average max. and min. temperatures in °C
- █ Precipitation totals in mm

Climate data for Emmitsburg, Maryland (1991–2020 normals, extremes 1956–present)
Month	Jan	Feb	Mar	Apr	May	Jun	Jul	Aug	Sep	Oct	Nov	Dec	Year
Record high °F (°C)	74 (23)	79 (26)	87 (31)	92 (33)	94 (34)	101 (38)	103 (39)	103 (39)	98 (37)	91 (33)	82 (28)	77 (25)	103 (39)
Mean daily maximum °F (°C)	40.0 (4.4)	42.8 (6.0)	51.9 (11.1)	64.0 (17.8)	72.4 (22.4)	80.8 (27.1)	85.4 (29.7)	83.6 (28.7)	77.0 (25.0)	65.9 (18.8)	54.4 (12.4)	44.2 (6.8)	63.5 (17.5)
Daily mean °F (°C)	31.1 (−0.5)	32.9 (0.5)	40.9 (4.9)	51.8 (11.0)	61.4 (16.3)	70.1 (21.2)	74.8 (23.8)	73.0 (22.8)	66.1 (18.9)	54.7 (12.6)	43.9 (6.6)	35.7 (2.1)	53.0 (11.7)
Mean daily minimum °F (°C)	22.3 (−5.4)	22.9 (−5.1)	29.8 (−1.2)	39.6 (4.2)	50.5 (10.3)	59.5 (15.3)	64.3 (17.9)	62.4 (16.9)	55.2 (12.9)	43.5 (6.4)	33.4 (0.8)	27.1 (−2.7)	42.5 (5.8)
Record low °F (°C)	−27 (−33)	−13 (−25)	−5 (−21)	15 (−9)	26 (−3)	35 (2)	39 (4)	36 (2)	24 (−4)	16 (−9)	9 (−13)	−19 (−28)	−27 (−33)
Average precipitation inches (mm)	3.50 (89)	2.55 (65)	4.19 (106)	3.88 (99)	4.31 (109)	4.26 (108)	4.31 (109)	3.53 (90)	5.18 (132)	3.78 (96)	3.40 (86)	3.76 (96)	46.65 (1,185)
Average snowfall inches (cm)	8.7 (22)	8.8 (22)	4.4 (11)	0.2 (0.51)	0.0 (0.0)	0.0 (0.0)	0.0 (0.0)	0.0 (0.0)	0.0 (0.0)	0.1 (0.25)	0.8 (2.0)	4.5 (11)	27.5 (70)
Average precipitation days (≥ 0.01 in)	9.0	8.3	9.9	10.8	12.5	10.6	10.5	9.7	9.3	8.7	8.0	9.3	116.6
Average snowy days (≥ 0.1 in)	3.0	3.0	2.1	0.1	0.0	0.0	0.0	0.0	0.0	0.0	0.3	1.8	10.3
Source: NOAA

== Infrastructure ==
=== Transportation ===
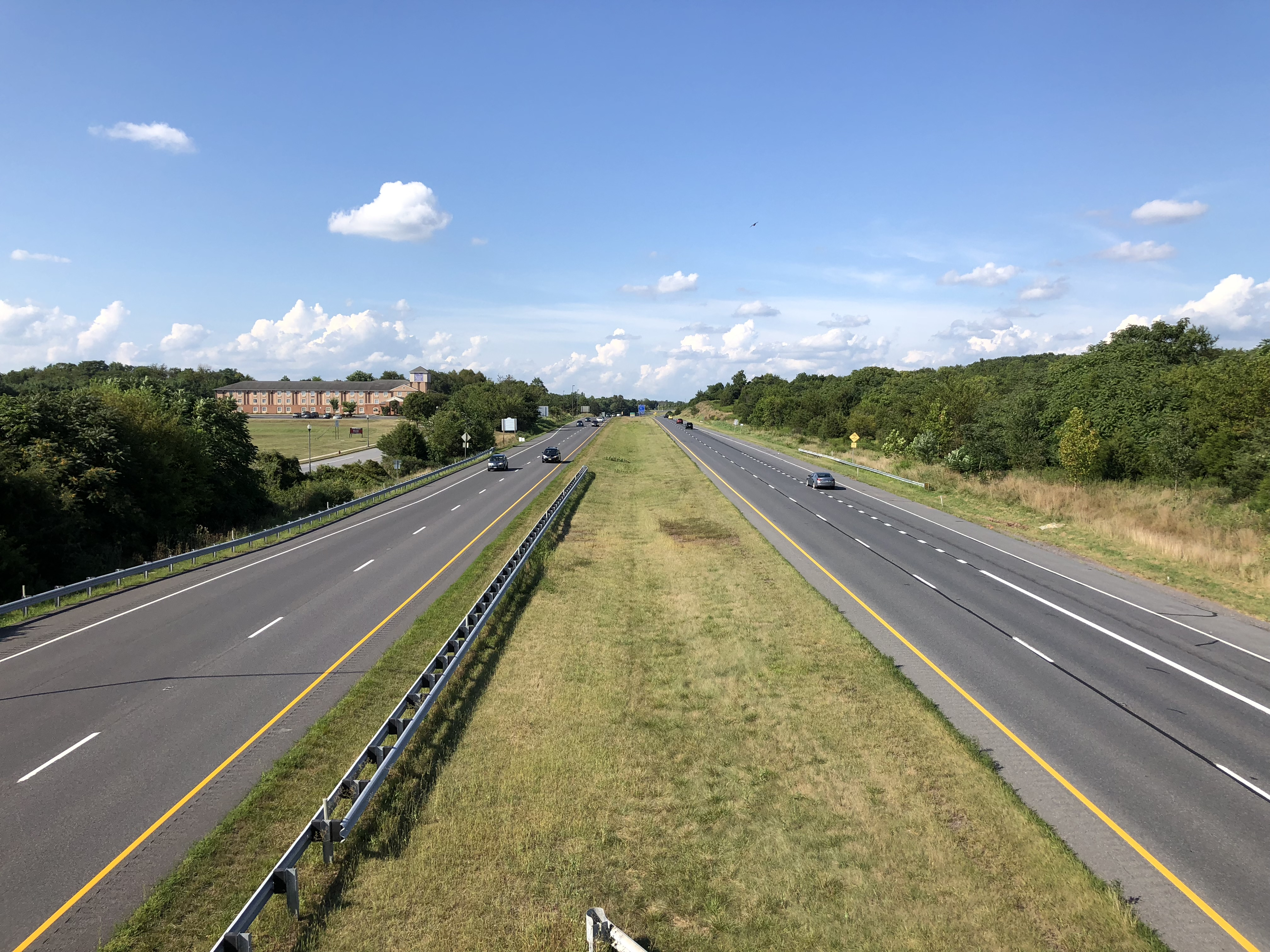
US 15 northbound in Emmitsburg

==== Roadways ====
The primary method of travel to and from Emmitsburg is by road. U.S. Route 15 is the main highway serving Emmitsburg, providing connections northward to Gettysburg, Pennsylvania and southward to Frederick. U.S. Route 15 Business follows the old alignment of US 15 through the center of Emmitsburg, with the main highway now following a bypass on the east side of town. Maryland Route 140 is the other main highway traversing the town, which provides connections eastward towards Westminster and eventually Baltimore. To the west, MD 140 crosses into Pennsylvania and becomes Pennsylvania Route 16.

==== Public transportation ====
Operated by TransIT, Emmitsburg is served by the Emmitsburg / Thurmont Shuttle. This line connects the town to Thurmont and Frederick. The service operates six days per week with three round trips on weekdays and two on Saturdays.

=== Utilities ===
The town was, as reported in 2026, slated to receive a multi-million dollar federal loan to replace a 70-year-old water line that had been particularly prone to leakages and water-quality complaints, as part of a larger "Western Maryland" infrastructure package; as of September 2026, the project remained in the "design phase".

== Demographics ==
Historical population
Census	Pop.	Note	%±
1850	812		—
1870	706		—
1880	847		20.0%
1890	844		−0.4%
1900	849		0.6%
1910	1,054		24.1%
1920	940		−10.8%
1930	1,235		31.4%
1940	1,412		14.3%
1950	1,261		−10.7%
1960	1,369		8.6%
1970	1,532		11.9%
1980	1,552		1.3%
1990	1,688		8.8%
2000	2,290		35.7%
2010	2,814		22.9%
2020	2,770		−1.6%
U.S. Decennial Census

=== 2020 census ===
As of the 2020 census, Emmitsburg had a population of 2,770. The median age was 40.2 years. 21.8% of residents were under the age of 18 and 18.7% of residents were 65 years of age or older. For every 100 females there were 86.5 males, and for every 100 females age 18 and over there were 83.9 males age 18 and over.

0.0% of residents lived in urban areas, while 100.0% lived in rural areas.

There were 1,042 households in Emmitsburg, of which 31.2% had children under the age of 18 living in them. Of all households, 42.8% were married-couple households, 18.7% were households with a male householder and no spouse or partner present, and 30.6% were households with a female householder and no spouse or partner present. About 29.7% of all households were made up of individuals and 14.5% had someone living alone who was 65 years of age or older.

There were 1,101 housing units, of which 5.4% were vacant. The homeowner vacancy rate was 1.8% and the rental vacancy rate was 3.8%.

Racial composition as of the 2020 census
Race	Number	Percent
White	2,489	89.9%
Black or African American	86	3.1%
American Indian and Alaska Native	3	0.1%
Asian	22	0.8%
Native Hawaiian and Other Pacific Islander	3	0.1%
Some other race	21	0.8%
Two or more races	146	5.3%
Hispanic or Latino (of any race)	126	4.5%

=== 2010 census ===
As of the census of 2010, there were 2,814 people, 997 households, and 670 families living in the town. The population density was 1,851.3 inhabitants per square mile (714.8/km^{2}). There were 1,070 housing units at an average density of 703.9 per square mile (271.8/km^{2}). The racial makeup of the town was 95.0% White, 2.0% African American, 0.2% Native American, 0.9% Asian, 0.7% from other races, and 1.3% from two or more races. Hispanic or Latino of any race were 2.5% of the population.

There were 997 households, of which 38.8% had children under the age of 18 living with them, 50.8% were married couples living together, 11.6% had a female householder with no husband present, 4.8% had a male householder with no wife present, and 32.8% were non-families. Of all households, 26.6% were made up of individuals, and 9.3% had someone living alone who was 65 years of age or older. The average household size was 2.64 and the average family size was 3.22.

The median age in the town was 39.5 years. 26% of residents were under the age of 18; 7.2% were between the ages of 18 and 24; 25.4% were from 25 to 44; 25.1% were from 45 to 64; and 16.3% were 65 years of age or older. The gender makeup of the town was 47.3% male and 52.7% female.

=== 2000 census ===
As of the census of 2000, there were 2,290 people, 811 households, and 553 families living in the town. The population density was 1,992.9 inhabitants per square mile (769.5/km^{2}). There were 862 housing units at an average density of 750.2 per square mile (289.7/km^{2}). The racial makeup of the town was 97.16% White, 0.87% African American, 0.04% Native American, 0.31% Asian, 0.04% from other races, and 1.57% from two or more races. Hispanic or Latino of any race were 0.44% of the population.

There were 811 households, out of which 38.3% had children under the age of 18 living with them, 50.2% were married couples living together, 13.2% had a female householder with no husband present, and 31.7% were non-families. Of all households, 26.8% were made up of individuals, and 11.1% had someone living alone who was 65 years of age or older. The average household size was 2.56 and the average family size was 3.03.

In the town, the population was spread out, with 24.4% under the age of 18, 6.7% from 18 to 24, 31.4% from 25 to 44, 16.6% from 45 to 64, and 20.8% who were 65 years of age or older. The median age was 37 years. For every 100 females, there were 76.7 males. For every 100 females age 18 and over, there were 70.0 males.

The median income for a household in the town was $38,710, and the median income for a family was $46,328. Males had a median income of $32,578 versus $23,235 for females. The per capita income for the town was $16,216. About 4.2% of families and 12.9% of the population were below the poverty line, including 4.1% of those under age 18 and 44.4% of those age 65 or over.

== Media ==
The town has two newspapers: the Emmitsburg News-Journal, and The Catoctin Banner, both of which are published monthly.

== Education ==
It is in Frederick County Public Schools.

School zoning is as follows: Emmitsburg Elementary School, Thurmont Middle School, and Catoctin High School.

Mount Saint Mary's University is in an unincorporated area in proximity to Emmitsburg.

== See also ==
- Emmitsburg Historic District
