= Cheraw (disambiguation) =

The Cheraw were a Native American people of North and South Carolina.

Cheraw may also refer to:

- Cheraw, Colorado
- Cheraw, Mississippi
- Cheraw, South Carolina
- Cheraw (YTB-802), a United States Navy Natick-class large harbor tug
- Cheraw (dance), traditional bamboo dance from Mizoram, India
