= George Gabriel Powell =

American colonel (1710–1779)

George Gabriel Powell (c. 1710 – 1779) was an acting governor of St Helena, who left the island in 1748, relocating to South Carolina, where he became a colonel in the state’s militia and the first speaker of its Provincial Congress (1775–76).

== The Powell family ==
George Powell was born into a family which had a particularly bad press in St Helena. His grandfather, Gabriel Powell senior, participated in the failed 1684 rebellion and led the fight for the rights of the rebels in its aftermath. He had been condemned to death, but managed to escape from his prison cell and secured a passage to Europe in 1688. George Powell’s father, Gabriel Powell junior, became the richest plantation owner on St Helena and was criticized for his avarice and the cruel treatment of his slaves. George Powell appears to have taken after his two forebears in many respects.

== Powell's career on St Helena ==
Map of St Helena showing Powell Bay on the south coast opposite Jamestown.

In his early years, Powell seemed to have remained free of controversy. In 1739 he was appointed a member of the four-person St Helena Executive Council. Two years later, aged about 31, he married Sarah Frances. By this time, he had also positioned himself as a champion of anti-corruption on the island. But St Helena historian Thomas Brooke, an ex-Governor of the island, claimed that Powell deliberately ingratiated the directors of the East India Company by exposing fraud in order to gain a position from which be could perpetrate even worse excesses. However, caution should be exercised, as almost all the sources for the St Helena period are hostile to the Powell family, partly because all three generations had, at some stage, come into direct conflict with the Governing authorities of the island.

Powell had been promoted to the rank of deputy governor in May 1741 to help the new Governor, Major Thomas Lambert, bring a new broom to the island’s affairs. But with the sudden death of Lambert, Powell was appointed acting governor in July 1742. He made an enemy of key islanders, particularly, Councilor Dixon, who was instrumental in bringing charges of large-scale fraud against him in May 1744. Powell refused to defend himself and claimed, like his grandfather and the rebels of 1684, that he was only prepared to submit to British law through a British Court of Justice rather than a self-interested tribunal of the East India Company. When the directors of the Company did move against him, he simply liquidated his extensive assets and fled the island for North America.

== Establishing himself in South Carolina ==
Powell’s public record was to be very different in his adopted country. In South Carolina, he established himself on a large plantation, called ‘Weymouth’, at the mouth of the Great Pee Dee River. As early as 1752, he was elected as a member for Prince George Parish in the Colony of South Carolina’s Commons House of Assembly and was appointed to a committee to report back on a petition from the locals for courthouses and law-enforcement measures.

Six years later, Powell is listed as a Colonel with the South Carolina militia. In late 1759, he participated in a three-month expedition against the Cherokee Nation, during the period when it was cooperating with the French.

Almost a decade later, he took a leading role in an attempt to quell disturbances in the ‘Back Country’ by a group ex-slaves and small landowners led by an armed band known as the ‘Regulators’. The main leader, at this time, was Gideon Gibson, an African-American landowner. He had overpowered a local constable’s party near Mars Bluff, killing one and whipping thirteen others. Powell had been dispatched with a small force to arrest Gibson and bring order back to the frontier areas of the Pee Dee. On 26 August 1768, William Bull, informed the Council, that he had received a letter from Colonel Powell in which he had described his inability to pacify the district and how even his own men sympathized with the Regulators and refused to act against them. It may be the case that Powell demonstrated a significant lack of judgement and understanding of local politics in his failure to carry out his mission. It took a few years for the Regulators to disband and for the frontier issues in the Back Country to be resolved. The Council was effectively powerless to stop them and neither Gibson nor his colleagues were brought to account. It was not really until a system of circuit courts was established that the movement dissipated. Legislation addressing their issues was put into effect in 1772 and it is only then that the Regulators disappeared from the record.

== Involvement in the independence movement ==
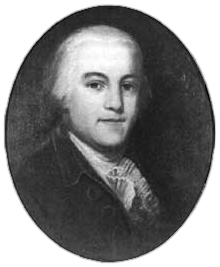
Edward Rutledge

In the late 1680s, Powell was also earning himself a reputation for supporting the growing independence movement. He had been a provincial judge, but was replaced by a Loyalist as the Council put its own supporters in the positions of authority. He also supported the Commons House’ opposition to the assumption that the Council was an ‘upper house’.

In 1772, as a magistrate in Charleston, appointed directly by the Commons House, he sided with another pro-Independence judge to support Edward Rutledge in advocating on behalf of an incarcerated printer. The principles at stake in this case were more significant than just freedom of speech. The case brought into question the extent and nature of the Council itself and whether it really held the power to have a citizen jailed. In this celebrated decision, George and his colleague disputed the legislative power of the Council. The printer was released to popular acclaim in Charleston. The Council, dominated as it was by Loyalists, tried to order the Commons Assembly to reverse the decision and dismiss the two judges, but this was ignored. It was a significant blow for the Loyalists.

Powell went on to consolidate his reputation as an American patriot in the early years of the American War of Independence. He was elected to the first and second Provincial Congresses of South Carolina, serving as its first Speaker. On 3 April 1776, Powell and John Parsons, had the privilege of addressing the newly appointed revolutionary Governor, John Rutledge, on behalf of the Provincial Congress. Powell’s speech was a carefully crafted justification of the war and a polite reminder for the Governor that the new constitution provided the overriding principles of government, to which he should adhere. Whatever is thought about the infamy of Powell and his antecedents on St Helena, this speech helps explain his family’s ideological position concerning the excesses of British colonialism.

== Military record ==
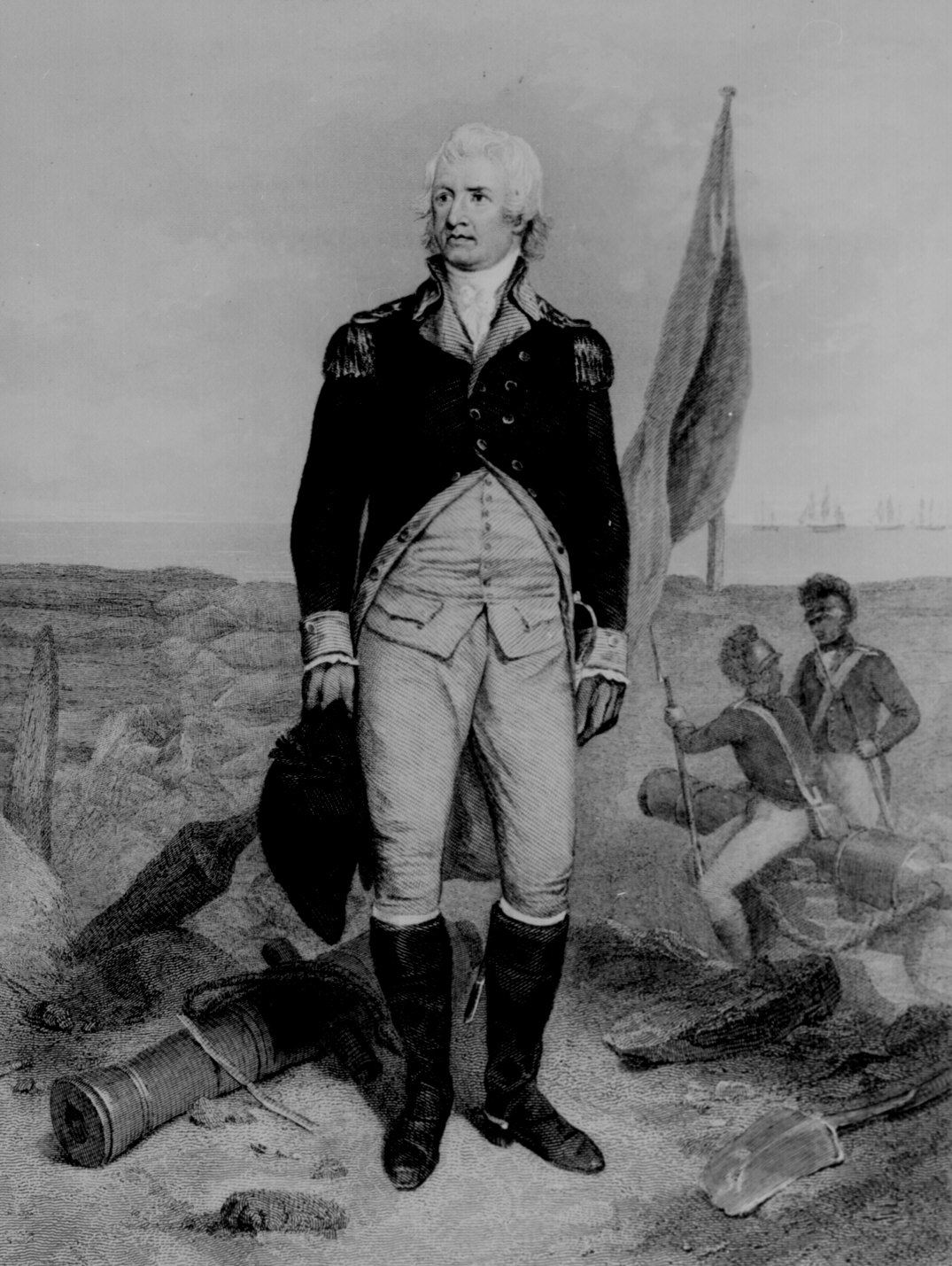
Col. William Moultrie

In the military sphere, Powell was active in helping organise the defenses of Charleston and the northern region of the state. His work must have been important, as the South Carolina militia was successful in repelling the first British attack on Charleston in 1776.

But Powell’s military record is not altogether positive. On two occasions, Powell seems reluctant to deploy his troops to reinforce other areas. On 28 November 1775, Congress ordered him to send 600 men to reinforce Colonel Richardson. On 20 December (i.e. almost four weeks later) he still had not acted on the order. As it happened, the order was reversed and there were no consequences for his tardiness. Powell may have had better intelligence than Congress, which may have motivated him in ignoring the order, or this may be an example of his wily ways. The second example occurs in April 1778, after set backs for the Americans in Philadelphia, when the general expectation amongst the South Carolina commanders is that they should all pitch in to reinforce Washington in the north. Powell’s Congress colleagues for the Parish of St David, Samuel Wise and Henry Harrington, reported that ‘Col. Powell told me yesterday he would not go off, for we should have enough on our hands without troubling them’. Again, it is hard to determine whether Powell was acting in his own self-interest, or whether, as a senior and experienced commander, he was genuine in his caution. In any case, he was right to consider that the situation in South Carolina was precarious. The British approached Charleston in May 1779, but had to retreat as General Benjamin Lincoln marched to the aid of the city, which was defended by General William Moultrie's troops.

In early 1776 Powell faced intense criticism of his mission to build a new fort at Cheraw Hill to shore up the northern reaches of the State and to garrison this stockade with supplies of gunpowder and a force of 50 men. Congress recalled him after considerable debate on the matter, in which Powell and his advocates argued strongly for its continuance. Nevertheless, the initiative was deemed to be too expensive and an inappropriate location for a major defensive investment. Another Colonel of the South Carolina forces, William Moultrie, who later became Governor of the State, was particularly critical of the venture. It might be argued that Powell, once more, was using public funds to suit his own purposes, as Cheraw Hill was in close proximity to his personal estates.

== Death ==
George Gabriel Powell died in January 1779. He was a flawed character, seen by some as a patriot and others as a schemer. Alexander Gregg, the Cheraws district historian and a local bishop, eulogized him as follows.

No man of the time had occupied a more conspicuous or honorable place in all connected with the public interests of the Pedee than George Gabriel Powell. On the 21st January his useful life was brought to a close in Christ Church Parish. Having early won the confidence and affection of the people on the Pedee, he retained his place in their esteem with singular uniformity through years of eventful changes, relinquishing at times, in their behalf, positions of more commanding influence, returning to their service as his first love, and devoting to it his mature labours to the end of his career. His memory should never cease to be cherished with admiring gratitude by the descendants of those whom he so faithfully served.

If Gregg had been aware of Powell’s disgrace as the acting Governor of St Helena, and the brutal treatment of the slaves, who worked on his plantations, his obituary might not have been so positive.
