= Parke Kolbe =

American academic

Parke Rexford Kolbe (Ohio, 1881 – February 28, 1942) was an American author, teacher, administrator, and president of three educational institutions; University of Akron, Polytechnic Institute of New York University, and Drexel University.

== Early life ==
Born in Ohio, Kolbe earned his first two degrees at Buchtel College, now known as the University of Akron. Training in linguistics he went on to study at Paris, Heidelberg, and Göttingen. After studying abroad Kolbe served as a Professor of Modern Languages at his alma mater from 1905 to 1913.

== Educational work ==
In 1913 Kolbe was chosen to serve as president of Buchtel College, guiding its transition from a college to what is now known as the University of Akron. He served in that capacity until 1925 when he became the president of the Polytechnic Institute of Brooklyn. During his tenure at Akron Kolbe penned The Colleges in the War Time and After in 1919. Three years after his appointment to the Polytechnic Institute, 1928, he published Urban Influences on Higher Education in England and the United States. Kolbe, a member of the educational commission to Soviet Russia, went to Russia as a part of a Cultural Delegation of twenty in 1928 along with Drexel's president, Kenneth G. Matheson.

== Drexel Institute ==
On May 16, 1932, after the burial of Drexel's previous president, Kenneth G. Matheson, Kolbe was invited by the Board of Trustees to visit the institute. After his visit, on June 9, he was offered the presidency of the university and started serving on October 1, 1932. During his first year of presidency Kolbe surveyed the institute and made several recommendations involving the strengthening of the internal organization. He achieved this by centralizing the admissions process and replacing the Faculty Council with a governing body, with deans, for each school.

During his tenure Kolbe strived to reverse the trend of falling enrollment at Drexel, he accomplished that by instituting an Open House, allowing Philadelphia-area high school students and their parents to visit Drexel. This program proved to be such a success that it was temporarily discontinued in 1938, due to peak enrollment being reached. In this time, Kolbe took note of the school’s need to expand, and, with the budgetary assistance of an increasing enrollment and slight raise in tuition, set to work appealing for a separate building for the library, as well as additional student use buildings and campus ground, including an athletics field. In addition to these improvements to the Institute Kolbe was responsible for increased research and the display of the Drexel Institute's Collections.

In 1936 the school was renamed the Drexel Institute of Technology after a 1935 survey of students found that with the art program no longer active the name "Drexel Institute of Art, Science, and Industry" was unnecessary.

Due to the great focus on engineering instruction placed on the school, Drexel was selected by the federal government to serve as the Philadelphia region’s school for instructing students in engineering defense in anticipation of World War II. This program grew rapidly during the times of war, with sixteen various classes being offered in the field of scientific national defense by 1941. Kolbe served as president until his death on February 28, 1942.
