= Jimmy Ingram =

- Born: James Edwin Ingram; February 23, 1928; Cheraw, South Carolina, U.S.
- Died: December 8, 1998 (aged 70); Cheraw, South Carolina, U.S.

NASCAR Cup Series career
- 3 races run over 3 years
- Best finish: 86th (1980)
- First race: 1951 Race 11 (Columbia)
- Last race: 1980 Mason-Dixon 500 (Dover)
Wins	Top tens	Poles
0	0	0

James Edwin Ingram Sr. (February 23, 1928 – December 8, 1998) was an American pilot and stock car racing driver. He made a number of starts in NASCAR's Winston Cup Series, several in the early 1950s and the last in 1980; the 27-year-gap between his second and third races are the longest time between starts in the series' history.

== Flying career ==
Ingram served in the United States Navy aboard the USS Dayton (CL-105) during World War II, where he was part of an aviation unit before being honorably discharged in 1946 as a seaman first class.

Ingram recorded over 11,000 flight hours during his career as a pilot for Southern Airways, Air Haïti with type ratings for the Convair CV-240 family, Martin 2-0-2 and 4-0-4, and Douglas DC-3. A member of the Aircraft Owners and Pilots Association, Ingram operated out of Cheraw Municipal Airport for 30 years, including a stint as its manager. He was a charter pilot for area industries and was a crop duster/aerial applicator for area farmers for 30 years, flying such aircraft as the Pawnee, the AgWagon, and a Bell helicopter.

During his NASCAR dormancy, Ingram was the team pilot for Holman-Moody, the company that at the time built racing engines for Fords in every major racing circuit..

== Racing career ==
In 1951, Ingram entered the NASCAR Grand National Series' Columbia Speedway. Racing a Henry J, he failed to finish and was classified 19th. His second start came at the 1952 Southern 500 at Darlington Raceway. Racing a 1951 Nash Ambassador, he started 52nd but crashed on lap 104. Ingram had lost control of his car, spinning before rolling three times. He was taken to the hospital after being extracted from the car, with an Associated Press report saying he was "bleeding profusely from face cuts before he could be released." Officially, he was classified as finishing 57th.

While he did not run a Grand National (later known as Cup Series) race again until 1980, Ingram remained involved in racing as Holman-Moody's pilot and the owner of Cheraw Speedway, the latter from 1955 to 1960 and from 1963 to 1968. The track began as a quarter-mile dirt track before becoming a paved 3/8-mile oval in the 1960s. His daughter inherited the property after his 1998 death; in 2020, she sold it to the Town of Cheraw, which operates the adjacent Cheraw Municipal Airport. Ingram operated his agriculture dusting and spraying business from a hangar adjacent to the speedway.

Ingram returned to the Cup Series in 1980 at Dover Downs International Speedway with his daughter Lynn Ingram as crew chief and friend and neighbor Willie Cassidy as the only other crew member. With 27-and-a-half years between Darlington and Dover, it was the largest gap between starts in Cup history and the first of two instances where a Cup driver had at least a 25-year pause. Despite the hiatus, he qualified 33rd and two miles per hour faster than the 34th and slowest car before finishing 15th. Ingram later entered that year's Darlington race, and was required to do rookie testing despite having raced there already; he had an extended run after initially failing to meet the minimum top speed of 140 miles per hour (230 km/h), which he eventually succeeded. However, he did not qualify for the event. He also missed another attempt at North Carolina Motor Speedway. During practice runs, he was posting speeds that would have qualified him for the race. However, his right front tire went flat during a practice run, sending his #32 car into the second turn retaining wall. The car bounced from the wall into the backstretch inner guard rail before coming to rest in the third turn, damaged so severely that it could not be repaired to run the race.

== Personal life ==
Ingram was born in Cheraw, South Carolina, the son of Doctor Boyd Ingram (his father was not a medical doctor; "Doctor" was his given name) and Willie Almina (Allie) Lide Ingram and one of two children. His 18-year-old sister Annie Jo Ingram was killed in a car accident in 1956. He graduated from Cheraw High School in 1943, after which he worked as an electric welder on a shipyard in Brunswick, Georgia, prior to joining the Navy.

Ingram was briefly married to Betty Hodge. He later married Betty Jean Lee in 1953; the couple divorced in 1980. They had a son James Edwin Ingram Jr. (died 1992) and daughter Nancy Lynn Ingram.

Besides flying and racing, other ventures included running businesses in home construction, trucking, logging, and tire recapping.

Ingram died at his home on December 8, 1998 at the age of 70.

== Motorsports career results ==
=== NASCAR ===
(key) (Bold – Pole position awarded by qualifying time. Italics – Pole position earned by points standings or practice time. * – Most laps led.)

==== Grand National Series ====
NASCAR Grand National Series results
Year	Team	No.	Make	1	2	3	4	5	6	7	8	9	10	11	12	13	14	15	16	17	18	19	20	21	22	23	24	25	26	27	28	29	30	31	32	33	34	35	36	37	38	39	40	41	NGNC	Pts	Ref
1951	Jimmy Ingram		Henry J	DAB	CLT	NMO	GAR	HBO	ASF	NWS	MAR	CAN	CLS	CLB; 19	DSP	GAR	GRS	BAI	HEI	AWS	MCF	ALS	MSF	FMS	MOR	ABS	DAR	CLB	CCS	LAN	CLT	DSP	WIL	HBO	TPN	PGS	MAR	OAK	NWS	HMS	JSP	ATL	GAR	NMO	NA	-	
1952	Jimmy Ingram	26	Nash	PBS	DAB	JSP	NWS	MAR	CLB	ATL	CCS	LAN	DAR	DSP	CAN	HAY	FMS	HBO	CLT	MSF	NIF	OSW	MON	MOR	PPS	MCF	AWS	DAR; 57	CCS	LAN	DSP	WIL	HBO	MAR	NWS	ATL	PBS								166th	0	

==== Winston Cup Series ====
NASCAR Winston Cup Series results
Year	Team	No.	Make	1	2	3	4	5	6	7	8	9	10	11	12	13	14	15	16	17	18	19	20	21	22	23	24	25	26	27	28	29	30	31	NWCC	Pts	Ref
1980	Ingram Racing	32	Chevy	RSD	DAY	RCH	CAR	ATL	BRI	DAR	NWS	MAR	TAL	NSV	DOV; 15	CLT	TWS	RSD	MCH	DAY	NSV	POC	TAL	MCH	BRI	DAR; DNQ	RCH	DOV	NWS	MAR	CLT	CAR; DNQ	ATL	ONT	86th	118	
