= Gabriel Powell (rebel) =

Gabriel Powell (born c. 1655) was an English soldier and planter who settled on the island of St Helena in 1673. He participated in a 1684 rebellion and against the colonial government until his incarceration in 1688. He escaped to Europe in 1689.

== Arrival on St Helena ==
Nothing specific is known about Powell's life before his arrival on St Helena, but it is clear that he was one of the soldiers who retook the island from the Dutch in May 1673. Captain Richard Munden was leading a small convoy of East Indiamen on its way back from the East, when he found the island annexed by the Dutch. Munden caught three fully loaded Dutch ships and landed a small force of marines behind Jamestown and recaptured the island on 4 May. He installed a temporary garrison to hold the island.

Gabriel Powell fought in Munden's campaign and seems to have been one of those soldiers, who remained to hold the island while awaiting reinforcements.

After these hostilities, the East India Company found it hard to convince the English settlers, who had fled the island, to return, let alone to recruit new colonists. A range of incentives was introduced and soldiers were encouraged to 'turn planter'. Powell must have seen this as an opportunity to make a new life for himself, as he quickly sought a discharge from the army so that he could start up his own plantation. This was granted and, as a single man, he was allotted 10 acres and a cow to get started.

== The beginnings of an island dynasty ==
Map of St Helena showing Powell Bay on the south coast opposite Jamestown.

In 1679 Powell married Mary Grubb, a domestic servant, who had arrived on the Johanna in 1678. They had at least three children together.

Throughout the early 1680s, Powell expanded his landholdings and established himself on the south coast at the opposite end of the island to the capital, Jamestown, where a bay, valley and point were named after the family.

Within two generations, the Powells had become the dominant planters on the island. By 1715, Gabriel Powell's eldest son and namesake was reported as having more land, cattle and slaves than any other planter. He also had one of the worst records of cruelty and greed on the island. Powell's grandson, George Powell, became Deputy Governor of St Helena in 1741 and acting Governor in the following year, but a few years later fled the island in disgrace and to avoid trial for the misappropriation of Company funds.

== Complaints of violence ==
The St Helena Council Consultations, which are filled with the complaints and counter-claims of the islanders, contain a number of disputes in which Gabriel Powell senior features. Amongst them are two very serious complaints in which he was accused of using excessive force. The first refers to a case in which he is said to have attacked a one-legged fisherman, Thomas Palmer. A witness, Richard Harding, claimed that Powell struck Palmer 'with a boat hook so that it broke and also threw a giant stone into the boat and hit the said Palmer's wooden leg.' Palmer had a poor record himself and Powell only received a light fine.

The second altercation concerned a dispute over a cattle contract, which Powell had made with a soldier, Joseph Wilks. Powell became so violent that he was said to have tried to tear out one of Wilks' eyes. As further evidence of his temperament, his accusers said that Powell had been recently overheard to have criticised the Governor and had also kicked and beaten a visiting Dutchman. Again, Powell escaped with a small fine and a promise of good behaviour.

== Convicted of trading with an interloper, July 1684 ==
His location on the far side of the island with direct access to the sea, put Powell in a good position to be able to profit form illegal trade with non-East India Company ships. He could sell supplies at a higher price than he would have received via Jamestown. These ships – known as 'interlopers' – also benefitted, in that they avoided the heavy duties imposed by the East India Company.

In July 1684, Powell was caught and fined heavily for this offence. Hudson Janisch, summarised his case as follows.

Gabriel Powell for trading with an Interloper sending off two cows at Friars Valley and attempting to send two more at Breakneck Valley but was prevented by the arrival of a party of soldiers also receiving a black woman slave – fined £15 and cows seized.

By this time, the authorities, clearly, had lost patience with Gabriel Powell. The size of the fine was significant; about half the purchase price of a 20-acre plantation. This incident demonstrates Powell's increasing dissatisfaction with the island's authorities and the severity of his punishment must have been a factor behind his decision to rebel.

== Powell's role in the 1684 rebellion ==
In 1684, there was growing discontent amongst both the civil and military populations on the island. The soldiers' grievances included: poor pay, rations and conditions (particularly, the harsh punishments); but their main gripe was that the East India Company was not honouring its commitment for a passage home at the end of their commissions. Many soldiers had served out their time already, but were stuck on the island, forced to endure extended service, with no end in sight. Even when a returning ship was available, requests for passage, in some cases, were denied on the basis of military considerations. Similarly, the island's planters were becoming more and more frustrated. Like the soldiers, they were unhappy with the martinet nature of the regime, but they also had to struggle with unstable economic conditions and an unsympathetic Governor in John Blackmore. The erratic responses of his administration, made it seem that the East India Company was more intent on milking the planters dry through taxation, than helping establish a robust market economy. The strongest voice for the planters on the council, John Coulston (sometimes spelled Coulson or Colson), had been removed and it appeared that the Governor and his Council were becoming out of touch.

Matters came to a head in 1684, when the new Deputy Governor, Robert Holden, introduced a range of new and significant taxes. He was even reported as saying that the islanders were subjects of the East India Company and not Britain. The inference taken was that the inhabitants, therefore, were not protected under British law and sovereignty.

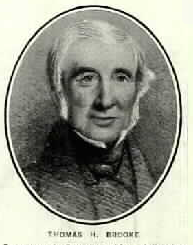
Thomas Brooke (1769–1857)

The rebellion was described over a century later by the island's first historian, Thomas Brooke, who had served as an acting Governor, himself (in 1821 and then in 1828). He was a strong supporter of the East India Company. As such, Brooke makes little attempt to hide his unsympathetic view of the rebels' cause.

After a few consultations among the malcontents, about sixty of them, soldiers and planters, armed with staves, musquets and swords, assembled in a tumultuous manner; and to give some colour to their outrageous intentions, endeavoured to make it appear that the Government was setting up an authority independent of the Crown … with a flag, made in imitation of the King's, marched downwards saying they were for the King … When they approached the fort, the Governor endeavoured to bring them to reason and commanded the soldiers to return to their allegiance, and obey his orders; but in vain … In attempting to force the gate they were fired upon by the guard, and three of their number were killed, and fourteen wounded. Upon this they retreated, and the remainder of the day passed without any further disturbance. The Governor receiving information that some of the principal mutineers had retired to the house of William Bowyer, one of their leaders, a serjeant's party was sent, the same night, to secure them; but on arriving at the house, the mutineers called to arms; upon which the party fired in at the windows, killed one man, wounded another, and seized six more, among whom was Bowyer himself.

Little mercy was shown the rebels and no heed was taken of their plea to be tried by a British court rather than the Governor's tribunal, which answered to the East India Company, rather than the Crown. Although numbers and details vary from version to version, further to the four rebels, who had already been killed in the uprising, two more were hung from the fort wall on 23 December 1684; another five were hung about twelve months later; at least six were exiled to Barbados (four of whom had had their death sentences commuted); about seven were forced to relocate to Bombay; and thirty other islanders were made to kneel down with halters around the necks and swear allegiance to the King and to thank the East India Company for its mercy.

Gabriel Powell had taken a prominent role in these events. Although he was not one of the men executed or exiled, he had marched on the garrison and was one of the leaders sentenced to death after events. For some reason, he was released and was allowed to remain on the island, although his company-issued musket was confiscated.

== Agitating for the rights of the 1684 rebels ==
Powell could have returned to a quiet life, like other rebels of 1684, but he chose to continue to agitate on behalf of his friends. In Brooke's account, a number of islanders, led by Powell and John Sheldon, mounted a campaign to the East India Company Directors and the British Government complaining of the harsh treatment of their friends and seeking financial redress, particularly for the widows and/or orphans of the executed rebels.

In December 1688, the final action he took was signing a petition, which had been drafted by a visiting ship's Captain, James Dore, who had also taken up the rebels' cause. Petitions had been specifically prohibited by the Governor as part of his attempt to put the matter to bed. The petition led to the arrest of Sheldon and Powell and an arbitrary sentence of death was applied to them both without trial.

== Escape to Europe ==
Powell seems to have languished in Fort James for over eight months. Janisch reports that conditions were so bad that:

Sheldon died quickly from the alleged severity of his confinement and Powell broke out of Prison and escaped to Europe in August 1689.

In April–May 1689, while he was still in prison, Powell managed, secretly, to sell off some of his assets to fund his escape, although, technically, the sale would need validation by the council. However, he did not try to sell the main Powell family plantation at Powell Bay, which his wife and children continued to occupy during his absence. A decade later, his children managed to claim the main family property in their own right.

Nothing much more is known about Powell's fate, after his escape, except that he secured a berth on the Rochester and reached Europe in August 1689. It is not known where he lived, although it is most likely that he settled in Holland, as he had connections with a number of Dutch people on the island. But what remains clear, is that the British Government never managed to apprehend him.
