= Noah O. Knight =

- Born: October 29, 1929; McBee, South Carolina, United States
- Died: November 24, 1951 (aged 22) near Kowang-San, Korea
- Burial place: Union Hill Baptist Church Cemetery, Pageland, South Carolina
- Military career
- Allegiance: United States
- Branch: United States Army
- Service years: c. 1950–1951
- Rank: Private First Class
- Units: Company F, 7th Infantry Regiment, 3rd Infantry Division
- Conflicts: Korean War (DOW)
- Awards: Medal of Honor; Purple Heart

Noah Odell Knight (October 29, 1929 – November 24, 1951) was a soldier in the United States Army during the Korean War, who was posthumously awarded the Medal of Honor for his actions on 23–24 November 1951.

== Medal of Honor citation ==
Rank and organization: Private First Class, U.S. Army, Company F, 7th Infantry Regiment, 3rd Infantry Division

Place and date: Near Kowang-San, Korea, November 23, and November 24, 1951

Entered service at: Jefferson, South Carolina Born: October 27, 1929, McBee, South Carolina

G.O. No.: 2, January 7, 1953

Citation:

Pfc. Knight, a member of Company F, distinguished himself by conspicuous gallantry and indomitable courage above and beyond the call of duty in action against the enemy. He occupied a key position in the defense perimeter when waves of enemy troops passed through their own artillery and mortar concentrations and charged the company position. Two direct hits from an enemy emplacement demolished his bunker and wounded him. Disregarding personal safety, he moved to a shallow depression for a better firing vantage. Unable to deliver effective fire from his defilade position, he left his shelter, moved through heavy fire in full view of the enemy and, firing into the ranks of the relentless assailants, inflicted numerous casualties, momentarily stemming the attack. Later during another vicious onslaught, he observed an enemy squad infiltrating the position and, counterattacking, killed or wounded the entire group. Expending the last of his ammunition, he discovered 3 enemy soldiers entering the friendly position with demolition charges. Realizing the explosives would enable the enemy to exploit the breach, he fearlessly rushed forward and disabled 2 assailants with the butt of his rifle when the third exploded a demolition charge killing the 3 enemy soldiers and mortally wounding Pfc. Knight. Pfc. Knight's supreme sacrifice and consummate devotion to duty reflect lasting glory on himself and uphold the noble traditions of the military service.

== See also ==
- List of Korean War Medal of Honor recipients
