= Joe Cheves =

American golfer (1918–2007)

Joe Cheves (May 23, 1918 – July 31, 2007) was an American professional golfer and co-founder of the American Golf Association.

Cheveswas born in Cheraw, South Carolina and died in Morganton, North Carolina. He served in the Army during World War II receiving the World War II Victory Medal, American Defense Service Medal, American Theater Service Ribbon, Good Conduct Medal, Philippine Liberation Service Medal, and the APT Service Medal.

Cheves is known for shooting 17 shots under his age when on August 27, 1999 he shot 64 (8-under par) at Mimosa Hills Country Club in Morganton. He first tied his age in 1982 at 64. He served as club professional in Bennettsville, South Carolina and Wadesboro, North Carolina but spend most of his career at Mimosa Hills Country Club.

== Tournaments won ==
- Carolinas PGA Seniors (1972, 75, 76, 83)
- Ben Hogan Staff Tournament
- CPGA Carolinas Senior Open

== Awards ==
- member of North Carolina Sports Hall of Fame
- 1964 Carolinas Section Golf Professional of the Year
- member of Carolinas Golf Hall of Fame
- member of Carolinas PGA Hall of Fame
- Burke County Sports Hall of Fame
