= John Wildhack =

Athletics director at Syracuse University in New York

Current position
- Conference: ACC

Biographical details
- Born: October 23, 1958 (age 68); Buffalo, New York, U.S.
- Education: Syracuse University

Administrative career (AD unless noted)
- 2016–2026: Syracuse

John Wildhack (born October 23, 1958) is an American former college athletics administrator. He served as the athletic director at Syracuse University from 2016 to 2026. Prior to this position, Wildhack was the executive vice president for programming and production at ESPN, where he had worked for 36 years.

== Early life and education ==
Wildhack was born in Kenmore, New York and graduated from Kenmore West Senior High School in 1976. He attended Syracuse from 1976 to 1980, earning a Bachelor of Arts degree in telecommunications from the S. I. Newhouse School of Public Communications.

== Career ==
=== ESPN ===
Wildhack career at ESPN spanned 36 years, in which he held a number of leadership roles. He started at ESPN in 1980 as a production assistant and steadily rose through the ranks to become the executive vice president for programming and production in 2014. In his role as executive vice president, Wildhack was responsible for 50,000 hours of content annually and reported directly to ESPN President John Skipper.

Wildhack was in charge of all production efforts at ESPN, in addition to content acquisitions and scheduling. He managed all league and conference relationships and negotiated all broadcast rights, including the NBA, SEC, College Football Playoff, ACC, Big 12, US Open Tennis, Rose Bowl, Sugar Bowl, WNBA, AAC, and MWC. He was responsible for several firsts at the network, including producing ESPN's first live regular-season college football game in September 1984 (BYU–Pitt) and its first live NFL game in August 1987.

Wildhack was an honoree at the "Newhouse at 40" Gala in 2005.

=== Syracuse ===
In July 2016, Wildhack was announced the 11th director of athletics at his alma mater, Syracuse University. He replaced Mark Coyle, who had spent only 11 months with the Orange before leaving for the same job at University of Minnesota. He had no prior experience in athletic administration, but his experience in the sport business industry and his connections with Syracuse University made him a preferred candidate for the job.

At Syracuse, he is responsible for leading the daily operations of a 20-sport athletics department with more than 600 student-athletes. During Wildhack's four-year tenure (As of 2020), Syracuse athletes competed in 39 NCAA national championship events (42 total), won 23 conference championships (four team, 19 individual), and two national championships.

Wildhack secured a $118 million investment from the university for renovation of the Carrier Dome, which underwent a roof replacement, air conditioning, and facilities upgrade. It reopened in fall 2020.

Off the field, he helped launch an in-house production unit in 2017 that has broadcast 301 live events and generated nearly 1,000 hours of content on the ACC Network and the conference's digital platform, ACC Network Extra. Multiple teams registered perfect Academic Progress Report scores and in 2018 the university's four-year average of 987 was the highest since tracking began.

In August 2020, SU extended his contract through 2025. In September 2020, he donated $1 million to SU athletics.

He is a member on the advisory board for the David B. Falk College of Sport and Human Dynamics at Syracuse University.

Wildhack retired on July 1, 2026, concluding 10 years as the AD at Syracuse. He was succeeded by Bryan Blair.

In 2025, Wildhack was appointed to NCAA Division I Men’s Basketball Committee for a 5-year term.

== Personal life ==
Wildhack is married to Amy (née Swanson), and they have two sons: Tommy, James. He is also the father of a son, M.J. The family lives in Jamesville, New York and has a summer home on the Sodus Bay. Wildhack's father, sister, brother, two nephews, and sister-in-law are all Syracuse graduates. His older brother, Henry, previously worked in the SU athletic department from 2006 to 2011 with AD Daryl Gross.
