= St. David's Episcopal Church and Cemetery =

Historic church in South Carolina, United States

- St. David's Church and Cemetery
- U.S. National Register of Historic Places
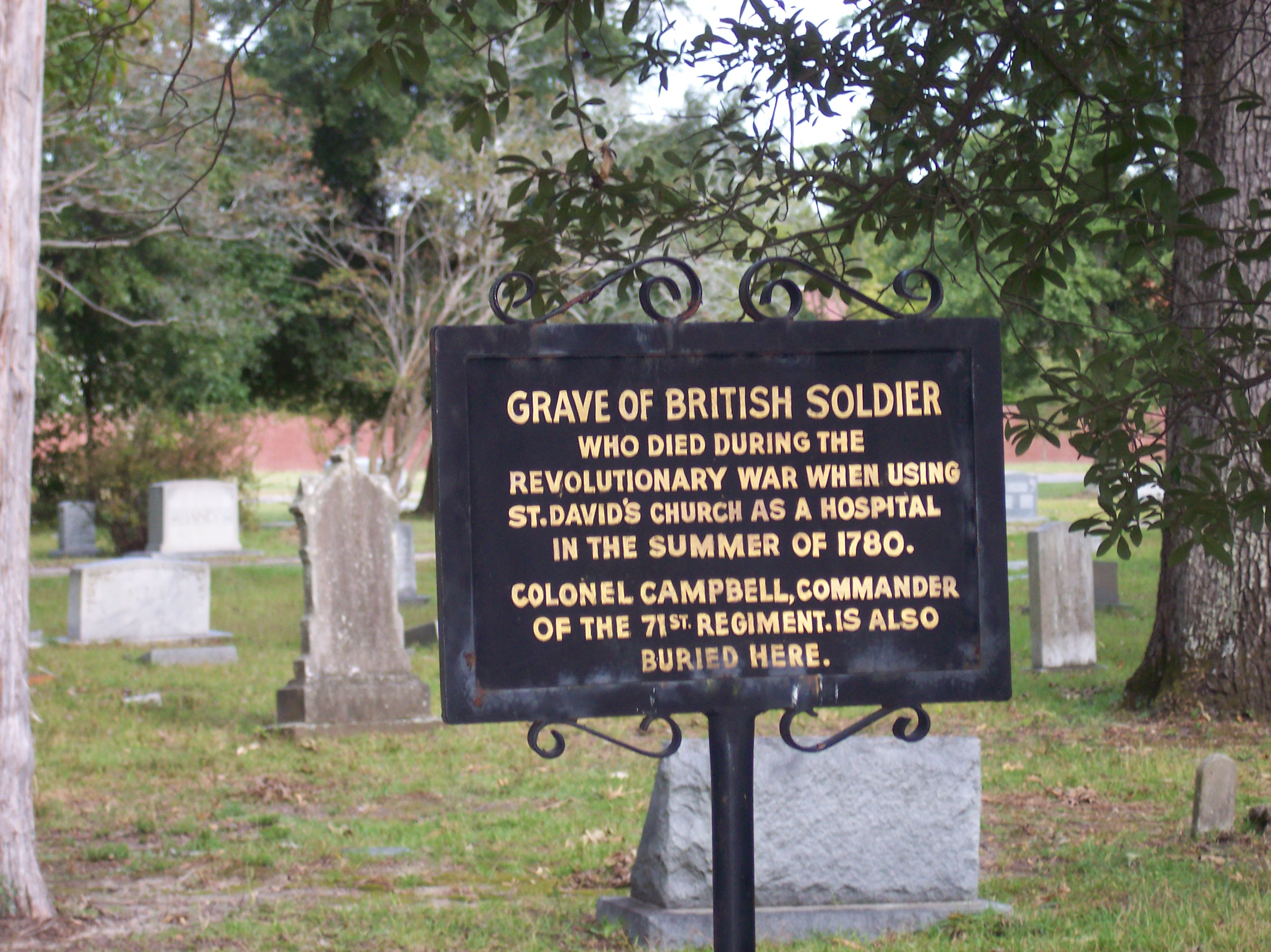

- Location within South Carolina Location within the United States
- Location: Church St., Cheraw, South Carolina
- Coordinates: 34°41′44″N 79°52′46″W
- Area: 8 acres (3.2 ha)
- Built: 1770
- NRHP reference No.: 71000761
- Added to NRHP: September 22, 1971

St. David's Church and Cemetery is a historic church and cemetery on Church Street in Cheraw, South Carolina.

It was built in 1770 and added to the National Register in 1971.

== Notable burials ==
- Alexander Gregg (1819–1893), a native of this area and the first bishop of Texas and author of History of the Old Cheraws.
- James McCutchen McJames (1873–1901), early professional baseball player.
- William P. Pollock (1870–1922), member of the S.C. General Assembly and U.S. Senator from South Carolina
- Capt. Moses Rogers (d. 1821) commanded the SS Savannah on its 1819 voyage when it became the first steamship to cross the Atlantic Ocean.
- William Francis Stevenson (1861–1942) U.S. Representative from South Carolina.
