= Donald Malloy =

American gospel musician

- Born: November 28, 1955 (age 70); Cheraw, South Carolina
- Origin: Newark, New Jersey
- Genres: Gospel, traditional black gospel, urban contemporary gospel
- Occupations: Singer, songwriter
- Instruments: Vocals, singer-songwriter
- Years active: 1985–present
- Labels: Atlanta International, Savoy, A&M, Light
- Website: donaldmalloyministries.com

Donald Malloy (born November 28, 1955), is an American gospel musician. He first came to prominence singing with the New Jersey Mass Choir and is a featured singer on the group's own 1985 version of the song they had originally recorded with Foreigner, "I Want to Know What Love Is." The following year, Malloy began his solo career, releasing the album, Holy Spirit. However, his solo career truly took off four years later in 1990, with the release of, There Is No Limit, that was released by Atlanta International Records. Malloy released albums in 1993 with Everything Will Be Alright by A&M Records, 1994's Hold on to the Promise with Light Records, Jesus Reigns in 1999 with Savoy Records. All but two of these albums chart upon the Billboard magazine charts, exclusively on the Gospel Albums chart.

== Early life ==
Malloy was born on November 28, 1955, in Cheraw, South Carolina, the son of the deceased, James Robert, and Loreain Malloy, his mother. Malloy was the fifth sibling born in his family, which his mother identified early on he had a musical acumen, and his mother promptly put him in the choir of Pleasant Grove AME Zion Church, where he did solos. Malloy is the music minister at Mt. Vernon Baptist Church that is located in Newark, New Jersey, where Rev. Milton Biggham is the senior pastor. He went to Lincoln Business School, where he graduated with a degree in Business Management.

== Music career ==
Malloy first gained recognition as a member of the New Jersey Mass Choir, who were fresh off of their collaboration with the rock band Foreigner on the 1984/85 number one hit, "I Want to Know What Love Is." Later in 1985, New Jersey Mass Choir released their own version of the tune, with Malloy contributing as one of the featured vocalists on this recording; it was the title track of the group's full-length album from that same year, featuring gospel-infused recordings of other popular mainstream songs from the time.

He began his solo recording music career the following year – 1986 – with the release of his debut album, Holy Spirit. However, he did not experience substantial success until 1990, with the release of There Is No Limit with Atlanta International Records on September 18, 1990,. This album was his breakthrough release on the Billboard magazine Gospel Albums chart at No. 39. His subsequent album with A&M Records in 1993, Everything Will Be Alright, and it charted on the aforementioned chart at No. 27. The third album, Hold on to the Promise, was released on September 13, 1994, by Light Records, again this charted on the aforementioned chart at No. 36. While Jesus Reigns released on November 2, 1993, by Savoy Records, yet it failed to chart.

== Personal life ==
Malloy is married to June, and together they have two children, Jessica and Christopher, and reside in Newark, New Jersey.

== Discography ==
List of studio albums, with selected chart positions
Title	Album details	Peak chart positions
Title	Album details	US Gos
Holy Spirit	Released: 1986; Label: Savoy; LP	–
There Is No Limit	Released: September 18, 1990; Label: Atlanta International; CD, digital download	39
Everything Will Be Alright	Released: 1993; Label: A&M; CD, digital download	27
Hold on to the Promise	Released: September 13, 1994; Label: Light; CD, digital download	36
Jesus Reigns	Released: November 2, 1999; Label: Savoy; CD, digital download	–
