= Shawn Short =

American choreographer, dancer, photographer and film director

- Born: April 1, 1978 (age 48); Cheraw, South Carolina, United States
- Education: Howard University; University of Wisconsin-Milwaukee
- Occupations: Choreographer, dancer, photographer, and film director
- Known for: Dissonance Dance Theatre; Ngoma Center for Dance

Shawn Short (born April 1, 1978) is an American choreographer, dancer, photographer, and film director. He also established the Ngoma Center for Dance and its main program, Dissonance Dance Theatre.

== Early life and education ==
Born to a Marine father and a working-class mother, Short was born in Cheraw, South Carolina, and later moved to Washington, DC before the age of five. A child born during the end of the disco era, Shawn Short boogied to music and movement. Growing up in the suburbs of Washington, DC, and later moving into the city for independence and higher education, Short's early performing arts training was rooted in classical music and dance, studying his craft throughout Washington, DC's arts scene. A young Black dancer during the decline of Washington, DC's Black dance golden age (1932 – 2000), Short represents one of the last African-American dance artists to study with Mike Malone (the founding director of Howard University's Musical Theatre department), and D.C. dancers and teachers such as Tyrone Murray, Assane Konte, Adrian Bolton, Katherine Smith, Sandra Fortune-Green, Adrian Vincent James, Fabian Barnes, and Miya Hisaka.

Short finished his undergraduate BFA in musical theater at Howard University and his graduate studies at the University of Wisconsin-Milwaukee.

== Career ==
=== Early career ===
Short started his career auditioning for local fashion shows and casting agencies. At that time in DC, Shawn decided to participate in a model call for fashion show producer Harvey Star Washington. Washington accepted Shawn and provided him with guidance. Short worked with Caesar Photography. He received callbacks from John Casablancas modeling agency, meeting and working with Ean Williams (who now heads DC Fashion Week and is also the Chief Designer of Corjor International). Short has also worked with Shaka King NYC, Eric Finn, Andrew Nowell, Reiss, Barney's NYC, Roy Cox, John Finegersh, Liang Zhang, Universal Gear, and Hechts Department Stores. Short also became the first cover model for Metro Weekly Magazine's first fashion issue.

=== Music ===
Short began his musical career while he was living in Prince George's County, Maryland. Starting in youth choirs sponsored by the county, short regularly performed at community events and the Kennedy Center for the Performing Arts. At eleven years old, he began his training as an instrumentalist, developing his skills as a flutist. He toured with the Lions Honors Band under Dr. Sparks, formerly of the University of Maryland College Park's music department. Shortly after his graduation, and as a graduate of Duval High School's vocal and instrumental department, Short attended college as a music major furthering his development as a musician. Taking an interest in musical composition and musical software, Short performed across college campuses, and the Appalachian region. His original musical composition in Dissonance Dance Theatre's New York City production "What The Eye Sees" debuted in 2010.

=== Theatre and dance ===
Short has worked together and studied with various artists, including faculty and dancers from Alvin Ailey American Dance Center, Dance Theatre of Harlem, Dance Alloy, Lines Ballet, Philadanco, and many others. As a student of ballet education, Shawn has studied with Margarita De Saa, John White, and former Washington School of Ballet Director Kee Juan Han – a Youth American Grand Prix "Teacher of the Year" award-winner.

Short has performed with professionals such as El Teatro de Danza Contemporanea de El Salvador, Bolton/Smith Dance Company, and Dance Alloy and toured with now-defunct K2 Dance.

Short also founded the Dissonance Dance Theater (DDT) in 2007. Later on, in 2012 he founded the Ngoma Center for Dance as the parent organization for DDT. Short also serves as the principal choreographer there. He has created more than 120 dances of DDT's classical and contemporary repertoire. Dissonance Dance Theatre has produced dancers who are now at Philadanco, Garth Fagan, Virginia Ballet Theatre, UniverSoul Circus, Phoenix Dance Theatre, and other dance and theatre companies.

He has been commissioned by Catholic University of America's Benjamin T. Rome School of Music to choreograph Mother's Blood (2008), VF Dance Theater for the Kennedy Center of the Performing Arts to choreograph Genotype Called Love for their Terrace Theatre production of Futurology (2012).

Short was the only artist supported by the New York Foundation for the Arts from 2009 to 2013. Shawn has choreographed for The Dance Institute of Washington, The Washington Ballet School of Ballet at THEARC. His work has been presented at the Capital Fringe Festival, Greater Washington Urban League National Conference, Southeastern University, Artists' Bloc 12X6 Series, Harke Theatre, Jack Guidone Theatre Space, Atlas Performing Arts Center, THEARC Theatre, Joe's Movement Emporium, DC Parks and Recreation, Sidney Harman Hall, Kennedy Center for the Performing Arts, PBS Broadcasting, VelocityDC, and Brooklyn Arts Exchange, Alliance for New Music-Theatre, Jazz at Lincoln Center, and WTTG (FOX 5) television. Short has also worked with Cynthia Geffon, a Super Bowl choreographer.

In 2020, Dissonance Dance Theater published its first book, Timeless Dance. Remixed. The book is about Dissonance Dance Theatre dancers.

=== Arts education ===
Short was Program Director for the Kelsey E. Collie Children's Theater Experience (KECCTE) – DC's oldest African American Children's theater – from 2001 – 2007. Short is also a founding faculty member of the Washington Ballet's south education campus in southeast DC, WSB@THEARC.

Short's students have included actress and playwright Asia Martin, actress Maya Allicock, Broadway 2015 Matilda-performer Cole Edelstein, Equity Actress/playwright Melissa Victors, "Dolly" 2019 national tour performer (Barnaby) Sean Burn, and others. Shawn Short was also the Catholic University of America's first Black professor of classical ballet (2008–2015).

=== Ngoma Center for Dance ===
Short founded the Ngoma Center for Dance in 2012. He also established The Ngoma School in 2014 to provide a vocational-dance perspective to its Black-majority student population. Students of the program have joined DDT through trainee and apprenticeship programs.

Short is also the Creative Producer of Black Dance Festival DMV, Black to Silver: A Black LGBT Experience, and Ngoma Reader Magazine, a minority artist magazine.

In 2020, Short founded Ngoma Film Works (NFW) with Dog Bark Media, a DC-based media company. NFW highlights urban and classic dance society, human relationships, cultural history, and "visual-choreo" art through documentaries and narrative film.

=== Film ===
Short has produced films such as His Eyes Saw Dance (2020), and Mute (2021), which he also directed. His films have won an award for best dance film at the Cannes World Film Festival, and selection at American Dance Festival's Movies by Movers Film Festival.

Short also holds a certification in TV and Film from New York University's Tisch School.
