= Bryan Blair =

Athletics director at Syracuse University in New York

Current position
- Title: Athletic director
- Team: Syracuse
- Conference: ACC

Biographical details
- Education: Wofford College (BA); University of South Carolina (JD)

Administrative career (AD unless noted)
- 2022–2026: Toledo
- 2026–present: Syracuse

Bryan B. Blair is an American athletic administrator and former football player. Blair is the 12th athletic director at Syracuse University from 2026 to present. Prior to becoming AD at Syracuse, Blair was the AD at Toledo. Before becoming an athletic administrator, he earned a Juris Doctor degree from South Carolina and played college football at Wofford.

== Early life ==
Blair grew up in Bennettsville, South Carolina and attended Cheraw High School where he was an All-State football player.

== Playing career ==
Blair played NCAA Division I college football at Wofford College at the nose tackle position from 2003-2006, graduating in 2007.

== Administrative career ==
Blair began his career in athletic administration first as an Academic and Membership Affairs Postgraduate Intern at the NCAA from 2010-11. Later becoming Compliance Coordinator at Rice University from 2011–12, serving as Assistant Director of Compliance Services at University of South Carolina from 2012-2014, and returning to Rice to serve as Senior Associate Athletic Director from 2014-18.

From 2018-2022, Blair served as deputy director of athletics and chief operating officer at Washington State University before leaving to be athletic director at University of Toledo.

In 2022, Blair was appointed as athletic director at Toledo. Under Blair's leadership at Toledo, a member of the Mid-American Conference (MAC), the Toledo Rockets won 13 MAC championships combined in all sports. This mark is more than the previous decade combined.

In March 2026, new Syracuse chancellor elect J. Michael Haynie announced that Blair would be appointed the new athletic director at Syracuse University. He succeeds John Wildhack, who retired after concluding 10 years as the AD at Syracuse.
