= Cheraw High School =

High school in South Carolina

Coordinates: 34.6926°N 79.9139°W

Location
- 649 Chesterfield Highway; Cheraw, South Carolina 29520; United States

Information
- Type: High school
- Established: 1924; 102 years ago
- School district: Chesterfield County School District
- Grades: 9-12
- Enrollment: c. 650
- Mascot: Braves
- Website: https://chs.chesterfieldschools.org/

Cheraw High School in Cheraw, South Carolina is part of the Chesterfield County School District. The school is located at 649 Chesterfield Highway. The Braves are the school mascot. It serves grades 9–12 with an enrollment of about 650. A majority of students are African American and 100 percent of the student body is categorized as economically disadvantaged. The school's math and reading scores are below the state average. Harold Palmera became principal in 2024.

In 1954, members of the senior class visited the U.S. Senate.

Chauncey Malachi served as principal. David Byrd has been athletic director for more than two decades. He is also Cheraw's mayor. Andy Poole is the football team's coach. Johnny White preceded him.

In 2020, the school won its second straight 2A football championship.

Wrestling coach Porter was inducted into the SCACA Hall of Fame. Tom Brewer was a volunteer pitching coach at the school.

== History ==
In 1892, the community's first school was built. The wooden school was succeeded in 1907 by Cheraw Graded School. In 1909, the school had nine grades. Cheraw High School on Huger Street was built in 1924 for $46,000. The 1914 school building was torn down in 1964.

African American students attended Coulter Memorial Academy, established in 1881, Dennis High School, built in 1936, and Robert Smalls School, built around 1953.

== Alumni ==
- Bryan Blair, athletic director
- Samuel Boan, state legislator
- Jaron Brown, football receiver
- Andy Hall, baseball and football player
- Dale Hatcher, football player
- Jimmy Ingram, NASCAR driver and pilot
- Harry Newsome, NFL punter
- Rhonda Reid Winston, judge
