= Alexander Gregg =

American clergyman

The Right Reverend Alexander Gregg
- Bishop of Texas
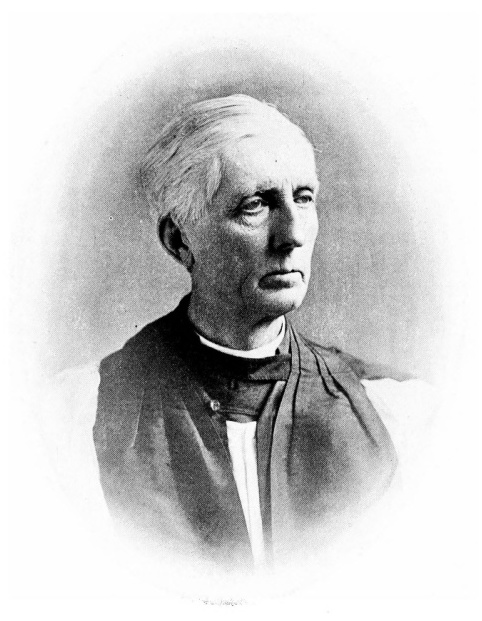
- Church: Episcopal Church
- Diocese: Texas
- Elected: May 5, 1859
- In office: 1859–1893
- Successor: George Herbert Kinsolving

Orders
- Ordination: December 19, 1847 by Christopher Edwards Gadsden
- Consecration: October 13, 1859 by John Henry Hopkins

Personal details
- Born: October 8, 1819 Society Hill, South Carolina, United States
- Died: July 11, 1893 (aged 73) Austin, Texas, United States
- Buried: St David's Church
- Denomination: Anglican
- Parents: David Gregg & Athalinda Brocky
- Spouse: Charlotte Wilson Kolloc (m. 1841; died 1880)
- Children: 10
- Education: South Carolina College

Alexander Gregg (October 8, 1819 – July 11, 1893) was an American Episcopal clergyman. He was the first bishop of Texas.

== Early life and education ==
Gregg was born on October 8, 1819, in Society Hill, South Carolina, Darlington County, South Carolina, in an area historically known as "the old Cheraws", the son of David Gregg and Athalinda Brocky. He was educated at the academy at Winnsboro, South Carolina, after which he attended the South Carolina College from where he graduated with a Bachelor of Arts in December 1838. He married Charlotte Wilson Kollock on April 21, 1841, and together had ten children. He was then admitted to practice law as an attorney in Cheraw, South Carolina, on December 6, 1841, and practiced law there for two years. Gregg became interested in the Episcopal Church and was eventually baptized and confirmed in 1843 at St David's Church.

== Ordained ministry ==
After his baptism and confirmation, Gregg became a candidate for holy orders. He was ordained deacon on June 10, 1846, and priest on December 19, 1847, at St Philip's Church by Bishop Christopher Edwards Gadsden of South Carolina. He spent his whole ministry, just before his election as bishop, as the rector of St David's Church in Cheraw, South Carolina.

== Episcopacy ==
Gregg was the first elected bishop of Texas on May 5, 1859, and was consecrated on October 13, 1859, by Presiding Bishop John Henry Hopkins. His diocese covered the entire state of Texas. Bishop Gregg presided through the difficult days of the Civil War and Reconstruction, and gave leadership as Texas changed from frontier to settled community. He saw the number of churches in his diocese grow from six to sixty. In 1874, toward the end of his episcopate, Gregg presided over the division of the Diocese of Texas into three dioceses – two new missionary districts of West Texas and North Texas. The Diocese of Texas retained the name of the original diocese in its present boundaries. He was also the fourth Chancellor of the University of the South, serving from August 1, 1887, until his death.

== Death ==
Bishop Gregg died in office at his Austin, Texas, home on July 10, 1893, is buried at Saint David's Church in Cheraw, South Carolina.

== See also ==
- Episcopal Church in the United States of America
- Episcopal Diocese of Texas
