= Virginia McLaurin =

American community volunteer (1909–2022)

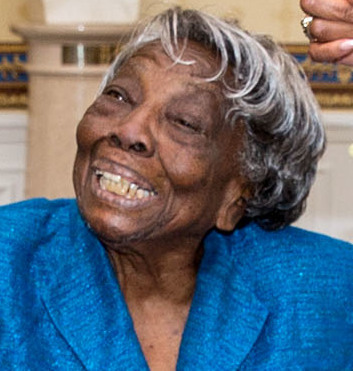
- McLaurin in 2016
- Born: Virginia Lugenia Campbell; March 12, 1909 (Note: There is no official record of McLaurin's birth. South Carolina Vital Statistics also provided an alternate date of March 12, 1916 or 1917, as they noted that they had not located any documents relating to the apparent date of birth.); Cheraw, South Carolina, U.S.
- Died: November 14, 2022 (aged 113 years, 247 days); Olney, Maryland, U.S.
- Other names: D.C.'s Favourite Centenarian; Grandma Virginia
- Occupations: Community worker; seamstress; manager of a laundry; farm worker
- Known for: Video of her dancing with Barack Obama and Michelle Obama at the White House in February 2016, after attending to collect the Presidents service award
- Children: 3
- Awards: President's Volunteer Service Award; Community Volunteer Service Award (2013)

Virginia Lugenia McLaurin (née Campbell, March 12, 1909 – November 14, 2022) was an American community volunteer, seamstress, manager of a laundry, farm worker, and a semi-supercentarian or supercentenarian, since her birth certificate was not located (or her official birthdate not recorded) believed to have been born between 1909 and 1917. Such a fact is not unusual, as she was born under the Jim Crow Laws and the public records at the time for Black and Native Americans were sometimes missing or inaccurate.

A resident of Washington, D.C., she gained notability after a video of her dancing with President Barack Obama and First Lady Michelle Obama at the White House went viral, where she was in attendance to receive the President's Volunteer Service Award for her service to the community on February 18, 2016, during a reception held for annual Black History Month, and also for her longevity claim, which although reported extensively by the media press remained unsourced by government and official records.

== Biography ==
McLaurin meets with President Barack Obama and First Lady Michelle Obama, in the Blue Room of the White House (February 2016)

=== Early life ===
McLaurin was born to a Black family of sharecroppers in Cheraw, South Carolina; her father, John Oliver Campbell, died when she was one and her mother, Flora Ella McQueen, taught her to sew. She has stated that "my grandfather was Methodist minister, and my father was a Baptist".

According to McLaurin, she "was birthed by a midwife and the birthday put in a Bible somewhere." In her childhood, she worked in the fields with her parents, shucking corn and picking cotton.

She was raised amid the Jim Crow era, when racial segregation was widespread throughout the Southern United States. Never receiving more than a third grade education, McLaurin was married at 13 and later moved to New Jersey as part of the Great Migration. Widowed when her husband was killed in a bar fight, she moved to Washington D.C. to be closer to her sister in 1939. Around this time she took responsibility for a three-year-old boy after his father had remarried and the new wife did not want to take on the child. McLaurin formally adopted the boy when he was aged 14.

Over the course of her life, McLaurin worked as a seamstress, as a domestic helper for families in Silver Spring, Maryland, and as manager of a laundry shop.

== Community volunteer ==
From the early 1980s onwards, McLaurin volunteered forty hours per week at Roots Public Charter School through AmeriCorps Seniors. She joined the United Planning Organization Foster Grandparent Program in October 1994. In 2013, she received a volunteer community service award from Mayor Vincent C. Gray. After a TV crew publicized the fact that her apartment was infested with bed bugs in 2014, a local pest control company removed the infestation and provided her with a free bed.

== Meeting the Obamas ==
Towards the end of the Obama administration, friends of McLaurin recommended to members of the Obama administration that she meet with the President due to her extensive history of volunteering. In February 2016, the White House hosted McLaurin in celebration of Black History Month. Upon meeting the President and First Lady, McLaurin gave them both hugs and started dancing with them. She would later say in interviews that she never felt that she would live to visit the White House, and she never thought there would be a day she would get to meet a Black President with his Black wife while celebrating Black history. Shortly after her meeting with the Obamas, the video of her dancing with the two went viral online. According to the local press, she was afterwards referred to as D.C.'s favorite centenarian and Grandma Virginia.

On March 11, 2016, McLaurin received the President's Volunteer Service Award for her two decades of service to schoolchildren. On May 27, 2016, she attended a Washington Nationals baseball game and was presented with a custom jersey on the field.

== Personal life and longevity ==
McLaurin had two children with her late husband; as of 2016, her daughter was 83 years old; her son had died. Despite this, she estimated she had about 50 living descendants. At least one of her grandchildren had a great-grandchild, making her a great-great-great-grandmother.

In 2016, McLaurin had trouble obtaining a replacement photo ID from the Washington, D.C. Department of Motor Vehicles because of bureaucratic difficulties acquiring a copy of her birth certificate from South Carolina.

On March 12, 2019, McLaurin turned 110 years old, becoming a supercentenarian. She celebrated her previous birthdays from ages 106 to 109 with her favorite basketball team, the Harlem Globetrotters.

McLaurin died at her home in Olney, Maryland, on November 14, 2022, at the acclaimed age of 113.
