= Kenneth G. Matheson =

American academic administrator

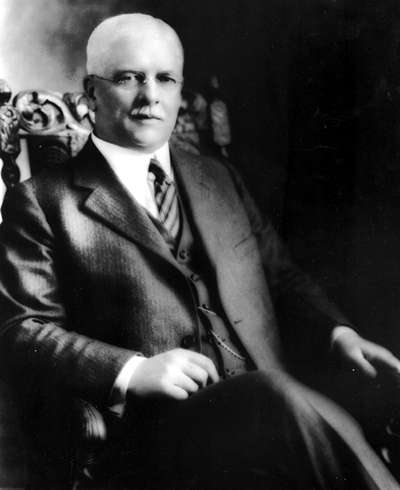
- Kenneth G. Matheson in 1906
- Born: July 28, 1864; Cheraw, South Carolina
- Died: November 29, 1931 (aged 67); Philadelphia, Pennsylvania
- Education: South Carolina Military Academy; Stanford University
- Occupations: Professor and university chancellor
- Employer(s): Georgia Military College; University of Tennessee; Missouri Military Academy; Georgia Institute of Technology; Drexel University
- Spouse: Belle Seddon Fleet 1899-
- Children: 4

Kenneth Gordon Matheson (July 28, 1864 - November 29, 1931) was a professor at and a chancellor of several educational institutions.

== Early life ==
Matheson was an 1885 graduate of the South Carolina Military Academy, now known as The Citadel where he was initiated into the Kappa Alpha Order. He then served as commandant of cadets at Georgia Military College in Milledgeville, Georgia from 1885 to 1888, at the University of Tennessee from 1888 to 1890, and at the Missouri Military Academy from 1890 to 1896; he also taught English at the latter two institutions. In 1896, Matheson resigned to enter Stanford University, and earned a master's degree in English in 1897.

== Georgia Tech ==
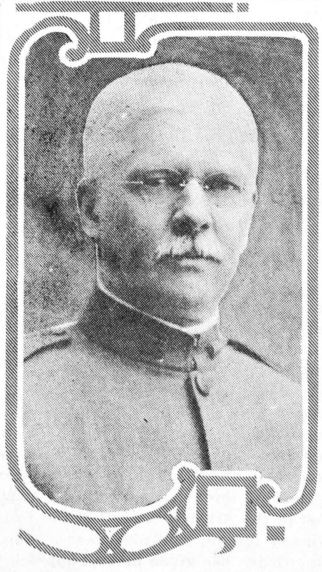
Matheson in 1918

Matheson was hired at the Georgia School of Technology (later known as the Georgia Institute of Technology) as a junior professor of English in 1897, but was quickly promoted to full professor in 1898 due to his department head's sudden and mysterious resignation. He then became head of the English Department.

After school president Lyman Hall's death on August 16, 1905, Matheson was elected chairman of the faculty and acting president. He was then officially appointed to the post in June 1906 and would serve until 1922. During his administration, Matheson oversaw the school's transition from a trade school to a technological university.

Matheson pioneered the bill that would eventually result in the establishment of the Georgia Tech Research Institute.

== Drexel University ==
While still serving as President at Georgia Tech, Matheson was elected president of Drexel Institute of Art, Science, and Industry, now known as Drexel University, in the fall of 1921. Before taking office Matheson succeeded in establishing ties to other local colleges, universities and high schools. As a result, Matheson was able to establish a formal cooperation between Drexel and the University of Pennsylvania enabling students of the School of Home Economics to attend theoretical courses not available at Drexel. In April 1922 he took office and proceeded to increase the efficiency of the university. During his presidency Matheson expanded both the co-operative education program and the campus. In 1931 Matheson was granted a leave of absence by the Board of Trustees however he repeatedly postponed it until his death of a heart attack on November 29, 1931.
