= Cheraw (YTB-802) =

US Navy harbor tug

History

United States
- Awarded: 2 May 1968
- Builder: Southern Shipbuilding Corp., Slidell, Louisiana
- Laid down: 12 March 1969
- Launched: 20 September 1969
- Acquired: 29 January 1970
- Stricken: 29 February 1996
- Identification: MMSI number: 366999428; Callsign: AEWU
- Status: Active with the Army Corps of Engineers

General characteristics
- Class & type: Natick-class large harbor tug
- Displacement: 291 long tons (296 t) (light); 351 long tons (357 t) (full)
- Length: 109 ft (33 m)
- Beam: 31 ft (9.4 m)
- Draft: 14 ft (4.3 m)
- Speed: 12 knots (14 mph; 22 km/h)
- Complement: 12
- Armament: None

Cheraw (YTB-802) was a United States Navy Natick-class large harbor tug named for Cheraw, South Carolina.

== Construction ==
The contract for Cheraw was awarded 2 May 1968. She was laid down on 12 March 1969 at Slidell, Louisiana, by Southern Shipbuilding Corp and launched 20 September 1969.

== Operational history ==
Cheraw was delivered to the Navy on 29 January 1970.

Stricken from the Navy List 29 February 1996, ex-Cheraw (YTB-802) was transferred to the Army Corps of Engineers 29 December 1996 at Buffalo, New York and renamed Cheraw.
