= Cheraw, South Carolina =

Cheraw
- Town
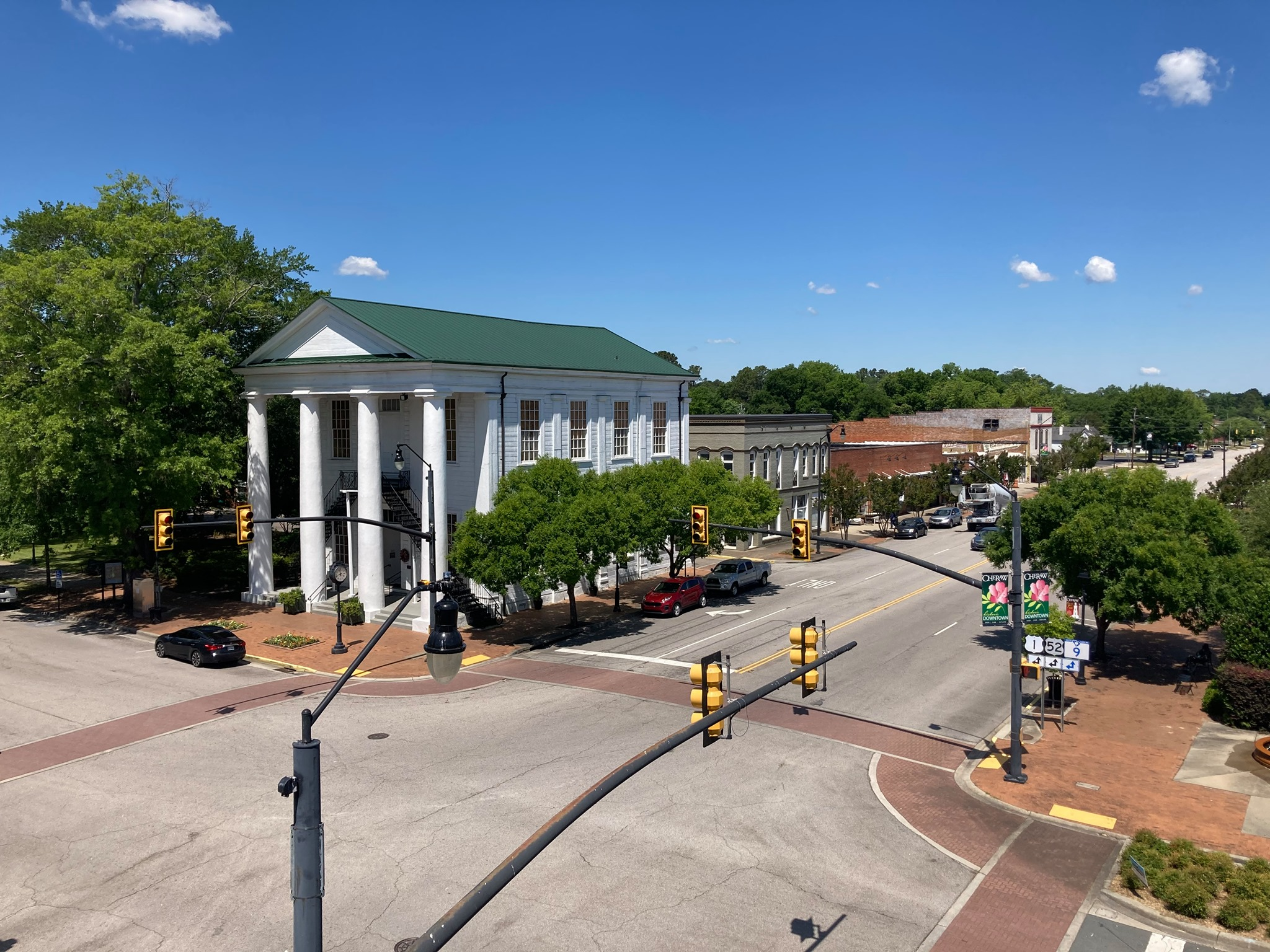
- A view of the Town Hall in Cheraw.

- Seal
- Motto: "Industry ~ Progress ~ History ~ Beauty"
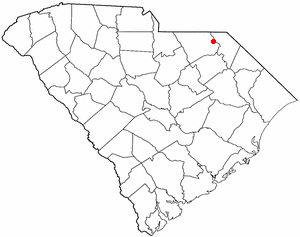
- Coordinates: 34°41′38″N 79°53′28″W
- Country: United States
- State: South Carolina
- Counties: Chesterfield, Marlboro

Government
  - Type: Council-Manager

Area
  - Total: 6.00 sq mi (15.53 km^{2})
  - Land: 5.95 sq mi (15.42 km^{2})
  - Water: 0.042 sq mi (0.11 km^{2})
- Elevation: 167 ft (51 m)

Population (2020)
  - Total: 5,040
  - Density: 846.6/sq mi (326.87/km^{2})
- Time zone: UTC-5 (Eastern (EST))
  - Summer (DST): UTC-4 (EDT)
- ZIP code: 29520
- Area codes: 843, 854
- FIPS code: 45-13600
- GNIS feature ID: 2406261
- Website: www.cheraw.com

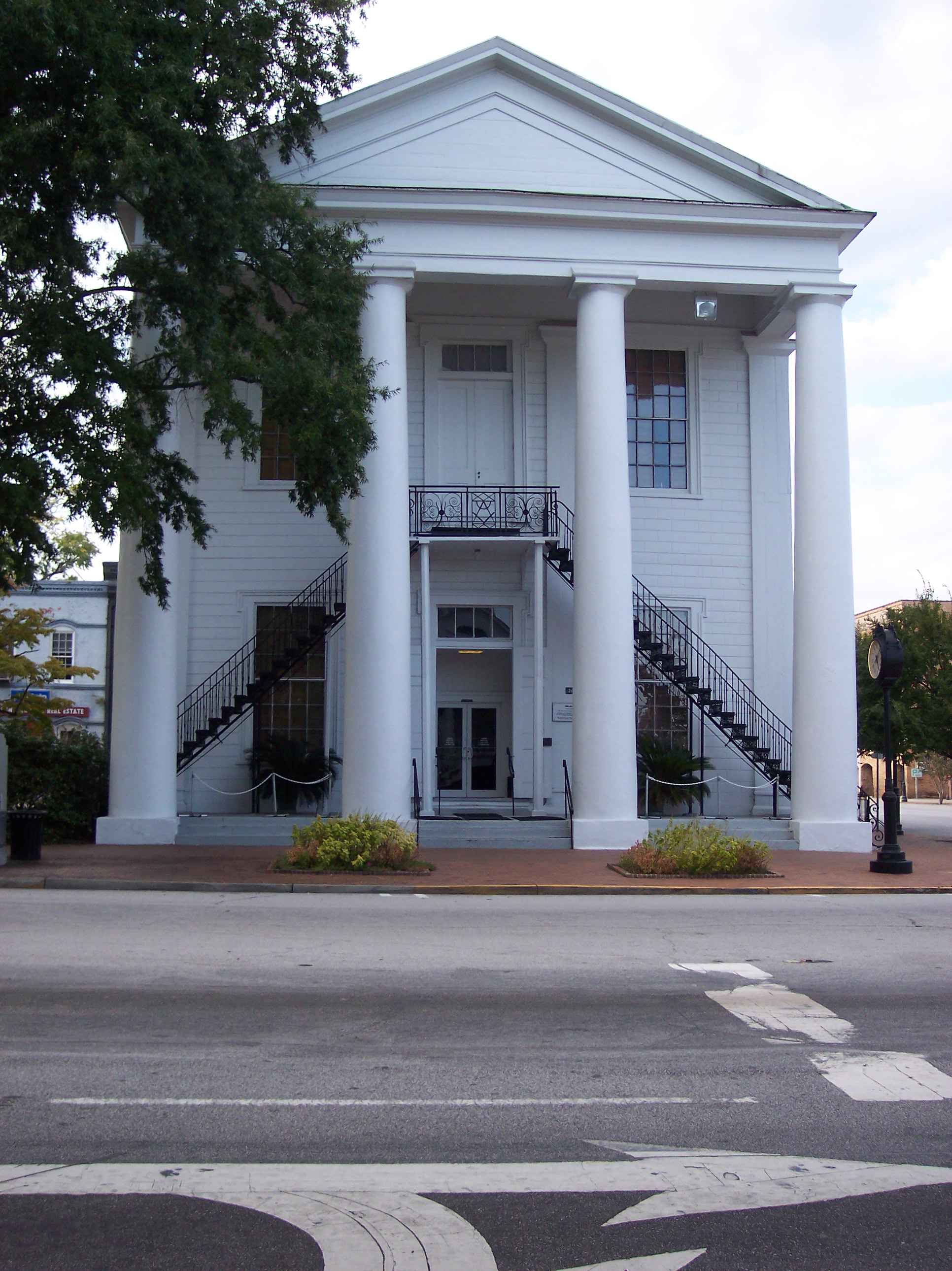
Historic Town Hall in downtown Cheraw

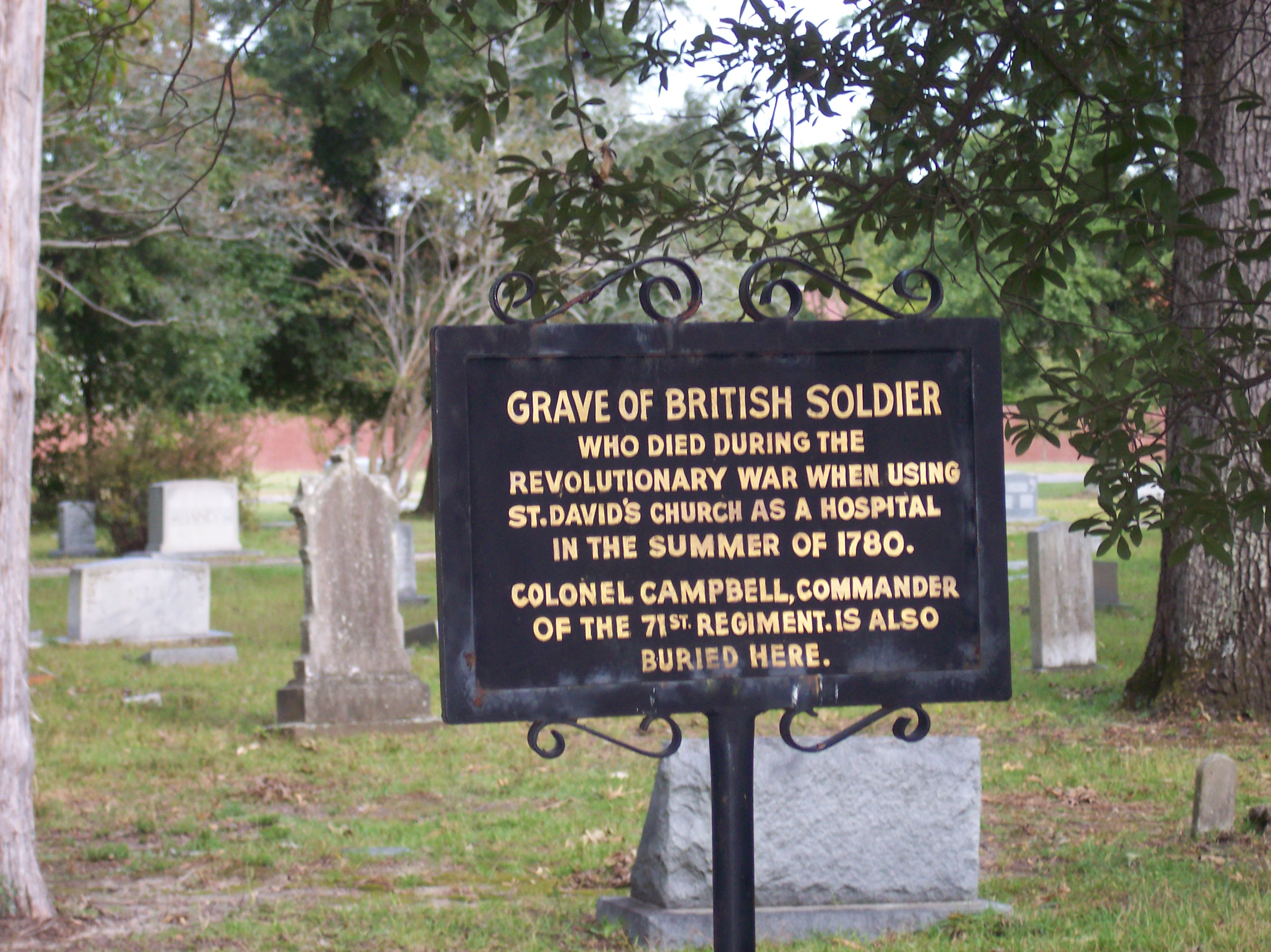
The grave marker for a British soldier in St. David's Cemetery

Cheraw (/tʃəˈrɔː/ chə-RAW, locally /ʃəˈrɔː/ shə-RAW) is a town on the Pee Dee River in Chesterfield County, South Carolina, United States, with portions extending into neighboring Marlboro County. The population was 5,040 at the 2020 census. The greater Cheraw area in the zip code 29520 has a population of 13,689 according to the 2019 ACS data. It has been nicknamed "The Prettiest Town in Dixie".

== History ==
=== Origins ===
When the first Europeans arrived in the area it was inhabited by the Cheraw and Pee Dee American Indian tribes. The Cheraw lived near the waterfall hill, near present-day Cheraw, but by the 1730s they had been devastated by new infectious disease inadvertently carried by the European traders. Survivors joined the Catawba Confederacy for safety and left their name in history. A few European settlers entered the area around Cheraw town in the 1730s, and were then forced upriver when the Welsh came to claim the Welsh Baptist lands granted by the English government in the area around Society Hill. Many of the early settlers of the 1740s in Cheraw were ethnic English, Scots, French Huguenots, or Scots-Irish.

By 1750, Cheraw had become an established Anglo-American village with a growing river trade, one of the first inland villages. It was one of only six places in South Carolina that appeared on English maps at the time. In the 1760s, Joseph and Eli Kershaw were granted the part of Cheraw that is now the downtown historic district. The Kershaws laid out a formal street system. By 1830 settlers lined all the streets with rows of elms. The Kershaws originally called the town "Chatham", but people never accepted this name, continuing to call it "Cheraw" or "Cheraw Hill".

=== American Revolution ===
There was a lack of organization and rule during the beginning of the 1740s in the backcountry of South Carolina. This lack of organization and unrest was an underlying cause of the resentment people of these areas felt toward the British Crown. In the Pee Dee area, planters organized a group called the Regulators to help bring order to the area. In 1768 St. David's Parish, the last Anglican Church built in South Carolina under King George III, was established to help serve the civic and religious needs of the Cheraw area. Later a judicial district and courthouse were established to help deal with the problem of order. However, there was still much discontent with the ruling authority, and in May 1776 the grand jury of the Cheraws District Two declared its independence from Great Britain.

Many area men played prominent roles in the American Revolution. They included Claudius Pegues, General Henry W. Harrington, the Ellerbe brothers, Philip Pledger, and Eli Kershaw. There was much unrest in the area during this time because Cheraw fell into part of the British strategic line of defense, where garrisons were built to control revolutionaries and to encourage loyalists. Other towns in this line of defense included Camden, South Carolina, and Augusta, Georgia. Cheraw also became a strategic point for the Americans. Military activity was especially heavy in Cheraw and surrounding counties from 1780 to 1781. During the Revolutionary War, St. David's Church was used as a hospital for British troops that operated under Lord Cornwallis's command and as quarters for the South Carolina militia. In December 1780, just across from Cheraw, American commander General Nathanael Greene set up a "camp of repose" to rest and train his men.

=== Early 19th century ===
In 1819, the first steamboat came up river, and along with it a burst of prosperity because of expanded trade. Cheraw was incorporated as a town in 1820. The main crops from the Cheraw area were corn, cotton, tobacco, rice and indigo. Cheraw had the largest cotton market between Georgetown, South Carolina, and Wilmington, North Carolina. Because of the cotton trade, the town boasted the largest bank in South Carolina outside of Charleston before the Civil War. Despite a serious fire in 1835, by 1850 the town was a prosperous center of trade.

=== Civil War ===
Leading up to the Civil War, Cheraw citizens played a key role in South Carolina's secession from the Union. On November 19, 1860, the first call for secession in a public meeting was made at the Chesterfield County Courthouse. John A. Inglis of Cheraw was in attendance. He later introduced the resolution for South Carolina to secede. Inglis was also named the chairman of the committee that wrote the document for South Carolina's secession.

From the beginning of the war, Cheraw was known as a place of refuge and a storehouse for valuables. In March 1865, General William T. Sherman brought his Union troops to Cheraw for several days. The town was strategically important due to its bridge across the Pee Dee River. The Confederate forces there were able to delay Sherman's army by destroying the bridge during their withdrawal from Cheraw. One Union soldier said that they found Cheraw to be "a pleasant town and an old one with the Southern aristocratic bearing." Sherman used this as a time to gain more control over his men. No private dwellings or public buildings in Cheraw were destroyed by Sherman and his troops. However, an accidental explosion of captured gunpowder at the river hill burned the Cheraw business district. The county courthouse in Chesterfield was burned in this event, resulting in the loss of many records. Thus, it is difficult to date many of the historic properties.

During the Civil War, St. David's Church was used as a hospital by both the Confederate and Union armies. Some troops from both armies were buried there. The first Confederate monument was erected there in 1867, a claim disputed by Romney, West Virginia. Originally, the monument did not mention the Confederate soldiers because the area was still occupied by Federal troops.

=== 20th century to present ===
The Civil War caused great economic hardship in Cheraw due to the destruction of its bridge across the Pee Dee River and the conflagration in its business district. However, by the early 1900s, prosperity began to return to Cheraw. Colored Memorial School was established in Cheraw.

The Great Depression again brought change. Cheraw State Park and Sandhills State Forest were both founded in the 1930s. Cheraw was the first municipality to use the Civilian Conservation Corps in South Carolina to build a state park. The plan, which was privately funded by the town's citizens, was to make Cheraw the "Gateway City" of South Carolina with the creation of Cheraw State Park. The park is the largest of the CCC-originated state parks in South Carolina.

By the 1950s and 1960s the groundwork was laid for industrial growth. By the end of the 20th century, Cheraw had a balanced industrial base while maintaining its historic charm, architectural treasures and natural resources. The harbor tug USS Cheraw was named in the town's honor.

In November, 1941, Cheraw saw pretend combat in its streets during the Battle of Pee Dee River, Phase 1 of the Carolina Maneuvers. General George Patton's 2nd Armored Division was the (Red) attacking force versus Major General Charles F. Thompson's I Corps defending (Blue). Tanks from Patton's division penetrated the defenses and entered the city center to be met by defending anti-tank guns. It was determined that Red's tanks were successful and Blue forces were forced to withdraw from the town.

In addition to St. David's Episcopal Church and Cemetery, the Cheraw Historic District and Robert Smalls School are listed on the National Register of Historic Places.

== Geography ==
Cheraw is located in eastern Chesterfield County at the fall line of the Pee Dee River. According to the United States Census Bureau, the town has a total area of 5.4 square miles (14.1 km^{2}), of which 5.4 square miles (14.0 km^{2}) is land and 0.04 square miles (0.1 km^{2}), or 0.64%, is water.

U.S. Route 1 passes through the center of the city, leading northeast 21 miles (34 km) to Rockingham, North Carolina, and southwest 55 miles (89 km) to Camden. U.S. Route 52 joins US 1 in the center of Cheraw but leads northwest 22 miles (35 km) to Wadesboro, North Carolina, and south 41 miles (66 km) to Florence. South Carolina Highway 9 also passes through the center of Cheraw, leading southeast 15 miles (24 km) to Bennettsville and west 12 miles (19 km) to Chesterfield, the county seat.

=== Climate ===
Cheraw has a humid subtropical climate (Köppen: Cfa) with long, hot summers and short, mild winters. The record high temperature of 108 °F (42 °C) was recorded on July 23, 1952, while the record low temperature of −9 °F (−23 °C) was recorded on February 14, 1899.

Climate data for Cheraw, South Carolina (1991–2020 normals, extremes 1893–present)
Month	Jan	Feb	Mar	Apr	May	Jun	Jul	Aug	Sep	Oct	Nov	Dec	Year
Record high °F (°C)	80 (27)	86 (30)	93 (34)	95 (35)	103 (39)	106 (41)	108 (42)	106 (41)	107 (42)	102 (39)	90 (32)	81 (27)	108 (42)
Mean maximum °F (°C)	73.4 (23.0)	75.8 (24.3)	82.2 (27.9)	86.9 (30.5)	91.9 (33.3)	96.9 (36.1)	97.4 (36.3)	97.0 (36.1)	92.2 (33.4)	85.9 (29.9)	79.4 (26.3)	73.9 (23.3)	99.2 (37.3)
Mean daily maximum °F (°C)	54.3 (12.4)	57.7 (14.3)	65.1 (18.4)	74.2 (23.4)	81.0 (27.2)	87.5 (30.8)	90.5 (32.5)	88.6 (31.4)	83.3 (28.5)	74.3 (23.5)	64.6 (18.1)	56.9 (13.8)	73.2 (22.9)
Daily mean °F (°C)	42.8 (6.0)	45.9 (7.7)	52.8 (11.6)	61.7 (16.5)	69.6 (20.9)	77.1 (25.1)	80.5 (26.9)	79.0 (26.1)	73.3 (22.9)	62.7 (17.1)	52.3 (11.3)	45.6 (7.6)	61.9 (16.6)
Mean daily minimum °F (°C)	31.4 (−0.3)	34.0 (1.1)	40.4 (4.7)	49.1 (9.5)	58.1 (14.5)	66.7 (19.3)	70.5 (21.4)	69.4 (20.8)	63.3 (17.4)	51.0 (10.6)	40.0 (4.4)	34.3 (1.3)	50.7 (10.4)
Mean minimum °F (°C)	16.6 (−8.6)	20.3 (−6.5)	25.0 (−3.9)	33.8 (1.0)	43.9 (6.6)	56.4 (13.6)	62.8 (17.1)	61.4 (16.3)	51.3 (10.7)	35.2 (1.8)	25.6 (−3.6)	20.9 (−6.2)	15.0 (−9.4)
Record low °F (°C)	0 (−18)	−9 (−23)	9 (−13)	23 (−5)	31 (−1)	44 (7)	50 (10)	49 (9)	40 (4)	23 (−5)	11 (−12)	5 (−15)	−9 (−23)
Average precipitation inches (mm)	3.51 (89)	3.06 (78)	3.76 (96)	3.31 (84)	3.66 (93)	4.79 (122)	5.18 (132)	5.09 (129)	5.35 (136)	3.90 (99)	3.27 (83)	3.74 (95)	48.62 (1,236)
Average snowfall inches (cm)	0.1 (0.25)	0.0 (0.0)	0.0 (0.0)	0.0 (0.0)	0.0 (0.0)	0.0 (0.0)	0.0 (0.0)	0.0 (0.0)	0.0 (0.0)	0.0 (0.0)	0.0 (0.0)	0.0 (0.0)	0.1 (0.25)
Average precipitation days (≥ 0.01 in)	12.1	10.9	11.1	9.5	9.9	11.4	12.7	12.3	9.9	9.9	10.1	12.2	132
Average snowy days (≥ 0.1 in)	0.1	0.0	0.0	0.0	0.0	0.0	0.0	0.0	0.0	0.0	0.0	0.0	0.1
Source: NOAA

== Demographics ==
Historical population
Census	Pop.	Note	%±
1880	918		—
1890	976		6.3%
1900	1,151		17.9%
1910	2,873		149.6%
1920	3,150		9.6%
1930	3,573		13.4%
1940	4,497		25.9%
1950	4,836		7.5%
1960	5,171		6.9%
1970	5,627		8.8%
1980	5,654		0.5%
1990	5,505		−2.6%
2000	5,524		0.3%
2010	5,851		5.9%
2020	5,040		−13.9%
U.S. Decennial Census

=== 2020 census ===
Cheraw racial composition
Race	Num.	Perc.
White (non-Hispanic)	1,962	38.93%
Black or African American (non-Hispanic)	2,641	52.4%
Native American	15	0.3%
Asian	76	1.51%
Pacific Islander	2	0.04%
Other/Mixed	219	4.35%
Hispanic or Latino	125	2.48%

As of the 2020 United States census, there were 5,040 people, 2,358 households, and 1,499 families residing in the town.

=== 2000 census ===
As of the census of 2000, there were 5,524 people, 2,290 households, and 1,470 families residing in the town. The population density was 1,197.6 inhabitants per square mile (462.4/km^{2}). There were 2,568 housing units at an average density of 556.7 per square mile (214.9/km^{2}). The racial makeup of the town was 52.2% African American, 45.8% White, 0.4% Native American, 0.81% Asian, 0.31% from other races, and 0.54% from two or more races. Hispanic or Latino of any race were 0.80% of the population.

There were 2,290 households, out of which 31.0% had children under the age of 18 living with them, 35.4% were married couples living together, 25.1% had a female householder with no husband present, and 35.8% were non-families. 33.0% of all households were made up of individuals, and 14.0% had someone living alone who was 65 years of age or older. The average household size was 2.32 and the average family size was 2.96.

In the town, the population was spread out, with 26.5% under the age of 18, 7.6% from 18 to 24, 24.4% from 25 to 44, 22.7% from 45 to 64, and 18.9% who were 65 years of age or older. The median age was 39 years. For every 100 females, there were 78.7 males. For every 100 females age 18 and over, there were 70.7 males.

The median income for a household in the town was $21,897, and the median income for a family was $31,136. Males had a median income of $27,405 versus $22,003 for females. The per capita income for the town was $13,801. About 27.3% of families and 32.1% of the population were below the poverty line, including 43.1% of those under age 18 and 21.9% of those age 65 or over.

Cheraw was the center of an urban cluster with a total population of 9,069 according to the 2000 census. In 2015, Cheraw and the surrounding areas of Chesterfield County had a population of 14,944 with a median income of $41,170 according to the U.S. Bureau of Census, American Community Survey's 5-year estimate and the Bureau of Statistics in Columbia, SC.

== Education ==
- Cheraw Primary School
- Cheraw Intermediate School
- Long Middle School
- Cheraw High School
- St. Davids School (preK3 to kindergarten)
- Faith Christian Academy
- Jesus Is Lord Christian School
- Northeastern Technical College

== Notable people ==
=== Arts and Culture ===
- Dizzy Gillespie, jazz trumpet player, singer, and composer; began the bebop style
- Parson James, singer/songwriter, best known for the song "Stole the Show"
- Donald Malloy, gospel singer/musician
- Virginia McLaurin, community volunteer, supercentenarian
- Frank Motley, R&B and jazz musician
- Shawn Short, dance choreographer
- David Thornton, actor, spouse of singer-songwriter Cyndi Lauper

=== Athletics ===
- Tom Brewer, former MLB pitcher
- Jaron Brown, Cheraw High School graduate; NFL wide receiver for two teams
- William P. Burch (1846–1926), U.S. Racing Hall of Fame Thoroughbred horse trainer
- Joe Cheves, former professional golfer
- Fisher DeBerry, football head coach, Air Force 1984–2006, and member of College Football Hall of Fame
- Pembroke Finlayson, former MLB pitcher
- Ty Gainey, former MLB outfielder
- Henry Gillespie, Negro league pitcher
- Andy Hall, former NFL quarterback
- Dale Hatcher, former NFL punter
- Jimmy Ingram, pilot and NASCAR driver
- Cliff Matthews, Cheraw High School graduate; NFL defensive end/defensive tackle
- Julius McCoy, former professional basketball player
- Doc McJames, former MLB pitcher
- Harry Newsome, former NFL punter

=== Government ===
- Patrick Austin, vice admiral and pioneer in naval aviation
- William Little Brown, justice of the Tennessee Supreme Court (1822–1824)
- Joyce Krawiec, North Carolina politician
- Kenneth G. Matheson, former professor at, and chancellor of, several educational institutions
- Henry McIver, former chief justice on the South Carolina Supreme Court
- Philip Phillips (lawyer), lawyer and politician
- William P. Pollock, United States Senator (1918–1919)
- William Francis Stevenson, mayor of Cheraw (1895–1896), US congressman (1917–1933)

=== Religion ===
- Charles F. Duvall, bishop of the Episcopal Diocese of the Central Gulf Coast (1981–2001)
- Abraham Cohen Labatt, prominent pioneer of Reform Judaism, one of the founders and first settlers of Cheraw
- Patrick Neeson Lynch, Roman Catholic bishop, Diocese of Charleston (1857–1882)
- Robert L. McLeod, pastor and academic administrator

== See also ==
- National Register of Historic Places listings in Chesterfield County, South Carolina
